= 2012 United States House of Representatives elections in New Mexico =

- November 6, 2012

All 3 New Mexico seats to the United States House of Representatives
	Majority party	Minority party
Party	Democratic	Republican
Last election	2	1
Seats won	2	1
Seat change	Steady	Steady
Popular vote	422,189	343,269
Percentage	55.11%	44.81%
Swing	▲3.53%	▼3.61%

Democratic
50–60%
60–70%
70–80%
80–90%
Republican
50–60%
60–70%
70–80%
80–90%

The 2012 United States House of Representatives elections in New Mexico were held on Tuesday, November 6, 2012, and elected the three U.S. representatives from the state, one from each of the state's three congressional districts. The elections coincided with those for other federal and state offices, including a quadrennial presidential election, and a U.S. Senate election.

== Overview ==
United States House of Representatives elections in New Mexico, 2012
Party	Votes	Percentage	Seats before	Seats after	+/–
Democratic	422,189	55.11%	2	2	-
Republican	343,269	44.81%	1	1	-
Independent (Write-in)	173	0.02%			-
Green Party (Write-in)	459	0.06%			-
Totals	766,090	100%	3	3	-

== District 1 ==
2012 New Mexico's 1st congressional district election
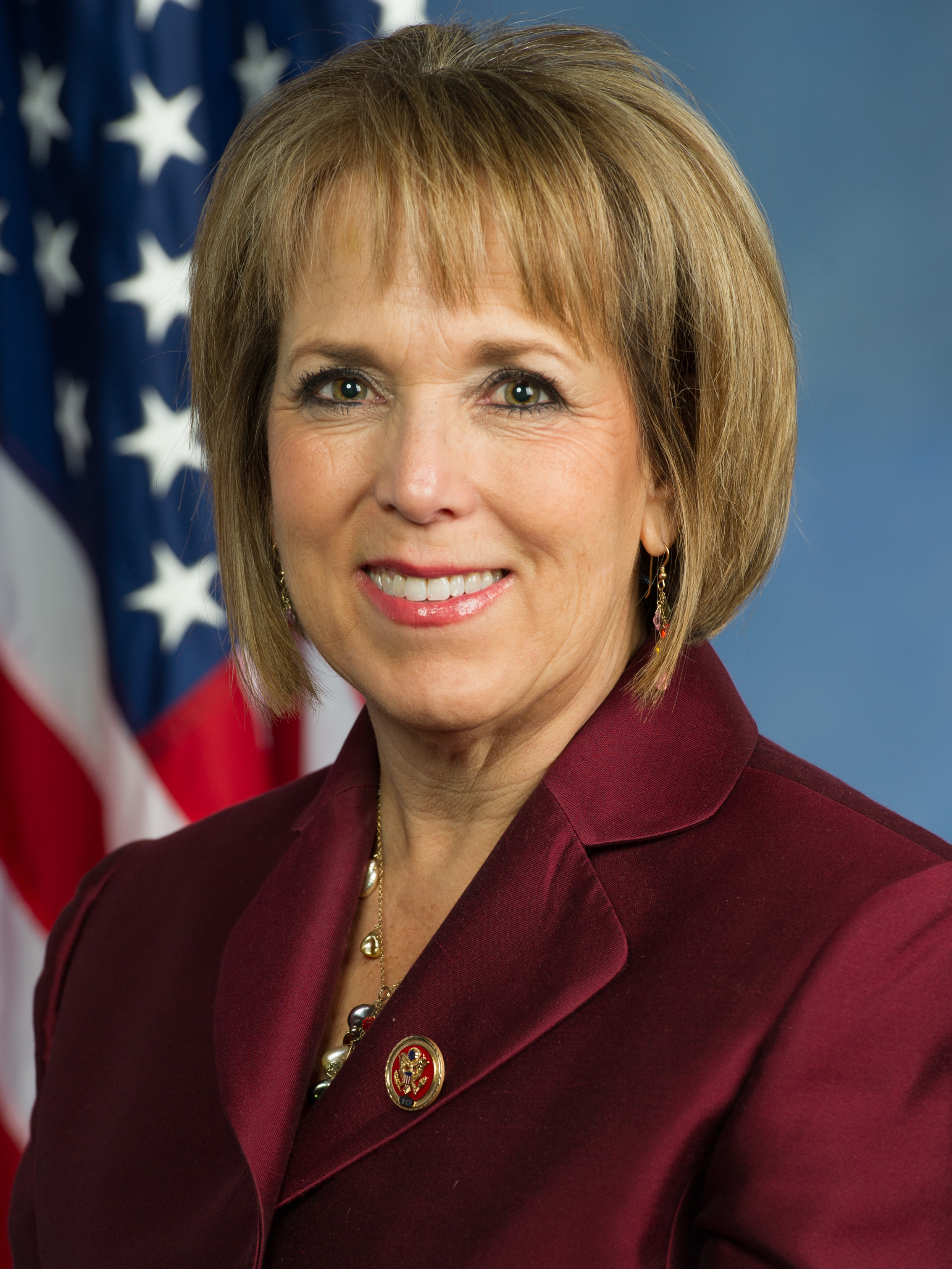

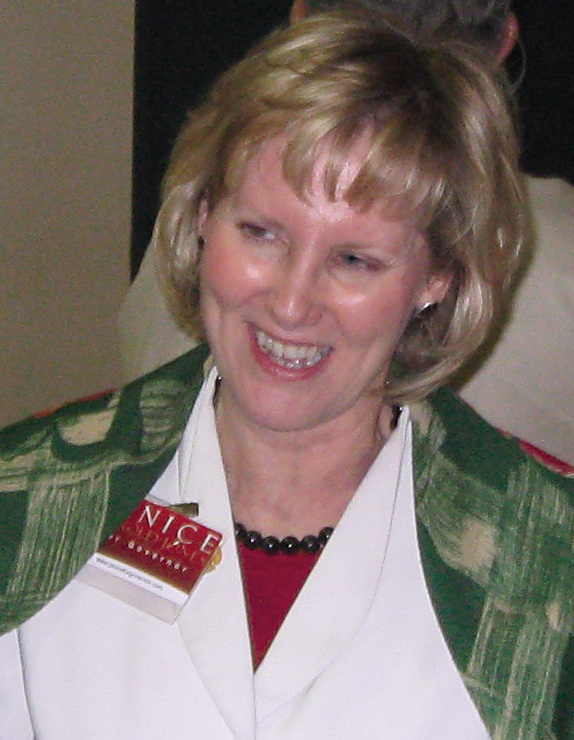
Nominee	Michelle Lujan Grisham	Janice Arnold-Jones
Party	Democratic	Republican
Popular vote	162,924	112,472
Percentage	59.1%	40.8%
U.S. Representative before election
Martin Heinrich
Democratic
Elected U.S. Representative
Michelle Lujan Grisham
Democratic

The redrawn 1st district serves the central area of New Mexico, including almost three-fourths of Albuquerque. Incumbent Democrat Martin Heinrich, first elected in 2008, did not seek reelection, but instead ran for the U.S. Senate seat vacated by Jeff Bingaman.

=== Democratic primary ===
==== Candidates ====
===== Nominee =====
- Michelle Lujan Grisham, Bernalillo County commissioner and candidate for this seat in 2008

===== Eliminated in primary =====
- Marty Chávez, former Albuquerque mayor
- Eric Griego, state senator

===== Declined =====
- Hector Balderas, state auditor
- Terry Brunner, head of rural development for the U.S. Department of Agriculture in New Mexico and Jeff Bingaman’s former state director
- Diane Denish, former lieutenant governor and nominee for governor in 2010
- Martin Heinrich, incumbent U.S. representative
- Timothy M. Keller, state senator
- James B. Lewis, state treasurer
- Moe Maestas, state representative
- Stuart Paisano, former governor of Sandia Pueblo

==== Primary results ====
Democratic primary results
Party	Candidate	Votes	%
Democratic	Michelle Lujan Grisham	19,111	40.1
Democratic	Eric Griego	16,702	35.0
Democratic	Martin Chávez	11,895	24.9
Total votes		47,708	100.0

=== Republican primary ===
==== Candidates ====
===== Nominee =====
- Janice Arnold-Jones, former state representative

===== Withdrawn =====
- Dan Lewis, Albuquerque City Councilmember

===== Disqualified =====
- Gary Smith, Army veteran

===== Declined =====
- Jon Barela, businessman and nominee for this seat in 2010

==== Primary results ====
Republican primary results
Party	Candidate	Votes	%
Republican	Janice Arnold-Jones	26,198	100.0
Total votes		26,198	100.0

=== General election ===
==== Endorsements ====
Michelle Lujan Grisham (D)

Organizations

- Democratic Congressional Campaign Committee "Red to Blue" Program
- EMILY's List
Janice Arnold-Jones (R)

Organizations

- Maggie's List

==== Polling ====
Poll source	Date(s) administered	Sample size	Margin of error	Michelle Lujan Grisham (D)	Janice Arnold-Jones (R)	Undecided
Research & Polling Inc	October 23–25, 2012	401	± 4.9%	51%	36%	13%
Research & Polling Inc	October 9–11, 2012	402	± 4.9%	51%	37%	12%
Greenberg Quinlan Rosner Research (D-Lujan Grisham)	October 8–9, 2012	407	± 5.0%	55%	40%	5%
Research & Polling Inc	September 3–6, 2012	409	± 4.8%	46%	34%	20%
Greenberg Quinlan Rosner Research (D-Lujan Grisham)	July 10–15, 2012	502	± 4.0%	50%	42%	8%

==== Predictions ====
Source	Ranking	As of
The Cook Political Report	Safe D	November 5, 2012
Rothenberg	Safe D	November 2, 2012
Roll Call	Safe D	November 4, 2012
Sabato's Crystal Ball	Safe D	November 5, 2012
NY Times	Lean D	November 4, 2012
RCP	Safe D	November 4, 2012
The Hill	Likely D	November 4, 2012

==== Results ====
New Mexico's 1st congressional district, 2012
Party	Candidate	Votes	%
Democratic	Michelle Lujan Grisham	162,924	59.1
Republican	Janice Arnold-Jones	112,472	40.8
Green	Jeanne Pahls (write-in)	459	0.2
Total votes		275,855	100.0
Democratic hold			

== District 2 ==
2012 New Mexico's 2nd congressional district election
- November 6, 2012
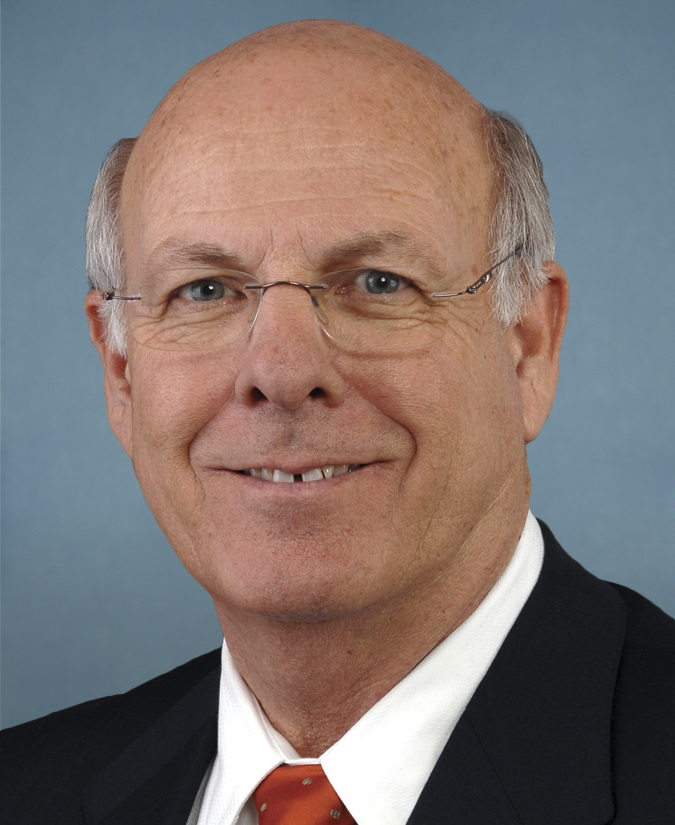

Nominee	Steve Pearce	Evelyn Madrid Erhard
Party	Republican	Democratic
Popular vote	133,180	92,162
Percentage	59.05%	40.86%
- County results Pearce: 50–60% 60–70% 70–80% 80–90% Erhard: 50–60%
U.S. Representative before election
Steve Pearce
Republican
Elected U.S. Representative
Steve Pearce
Republican

Incumbent Republican Steve Pearce was elected in 2010, having previously served from 2003 until 2009. Pearce sought reelection in 2012.

=== Republican primary ===
==== Candidates ====
===== Nominee =====
- Steve Pearce, incumbent U.S. representative

==== Primary results ====
Republican primary results
Party	Candidate	Votes	%
Republican	Steve Pearce (incumbent)	29,911	100.0
Total votes		29,911	100.0

=== Democratic primary ===
==== Candidates ====
===== Nominee =====
- Evelyn Madrid Erhard, former teacher at New Mexico State University

===== Withdrawn =====
- Martin Resendiz, mayor of Sunland Park

===== Disqualified =====
- Frank McKinnon, businessman and candidate for this seat in 2008

===== Declined =====
- Nate Cote, state representative
- Edgar Lopez, head of a real estate company
- Harry Teague, former U.S. representative

==== Primary results ====
Democratic primary results
Party	Candidate	Votes	%
Democratic	Evelyn Madrid Erhard	24,175	100.0
Total votes		24,175	100.0

=== General election ===
==== Polling ====
Poll source	Date(s) administered	Sample size	Margin of error	Steve Pearce (R)	Evelyn Madrid Erhard (D)	Undecided
Research & Polling Inc	October 23–25, 2012	113	± 9.2%	56%	38%	6%
Research & Polling Inc	October 9–11, 2012	116	± 9.1%	55%	31%	15%
Research & Polling Inc	September 3–6, 2012	119	± 9.0%	56%	30%	14%

==== Results ====
New Mexico's 2nd congressional district, 2012
Party	Candidate	Votes	%
Republican	Steve Pearce (incumbent)	133,180	59.0
Democratic	Evelyn Madrid Erhard	92,162	40.9
Independent	Jack A. McGrann (write-In)	173	0.1
Total votes		225,515	100.0
Republican hold			

==== Predictions ====
Source	Ranking	As of
The Cook Political Report	Safe R	November 5, 2012
Rothenberg	Safe R	November 2, 2012
Roll Call	Safe R	November 4, 2012
Sabato's Crystal Ball	Safe R	November 5, 2012
NY Times	Safe R	November 4, 2012
RCP	Safe R	November 4, 2012
The Hill	Safe R	November 4, 2012

== District 3 ==
2012 New Mexico's 3rd congressional district election

Nominee	Ben Ray Luján	Jefferson Byrd
Party	Democratic	Republican
Popular vote	167,103	97,616
Percentage	63.1%	36.9%
- County results Lujan: 50–60% 70–80% 80–90% Byrd: 50–60% 60–70%
U.S. Representative before election
Ben Ray Luján
Democratic
Elected U.S. Representative
Ben Ray Luján
Democratic

Incumbent Democrat Ben Ray Luján was first elected in 2008. In April 2011 Luján declined to enter the U.S. Senate race and instead chose to seek reelection to the House of Representatives.

=== Democratic primary ===
==== Candidates ====
===== Nominee =====
- Ben Ray Luján, incumbent U.S. representative

===== Declined =====
- Sean Closson, artist and hotel worker
- Harry Montoya, Santa Fe County executive

==== Primary results ====
Democratic primary results
Party	Candidate	Votes	%
Democratic	Ben R. Luján (incumbent)	53,908	100.0
Total votes		53,908	100.0

=== Republican primary ===
==== Candidates ====
===== Nominee =====
- Jefferson Byrd, rancher

===== Eliminated in primary =====
- Rick Newton, businessman

==== Primary results ====
Republican primary results
Party	Candidate	Votes	%
Republican	Jefferson L. Byrd	13,055	53.5
Republican	Frederick L. Newton	11,340	46.5
Total votes		24,395	100.0

=== General election ===
==== Polling ====
Poll source	Date(s) administered	Sample size	Margin of error	Ben Ray Luján (D)	Jefferson Byrd (R)	Undecided
Research & Polling Inc	October 23–25, 2012	148	± 8.0%	53%	35%	12%
Research & Polling Inc	October 9–11, 2012	140	± 8.3%	58%	34%	8%
Research & Polling Inc	September 3–6, 2012	139	± 8.3%	57%	31%	12%

==== Results ====
New Mexico's 3rd congressional district, 2012
Party	Candidate	Votes	%
Democratic	Ben Ray Luján (incumbent)	167,103	63.1
Republican	Jefferson Byrd	97,616	36.9
Total votes		264,719	100.0
Democratic hold			

==== Predictions ====
Source	Ranking	As of
The Cook Political Report	Safe D	November 5, 2012
Rothenberg	Safe D	November 2, 2012
Roll Call	Safe D	November 4, 2012
Sabato's Crystal Ball	Safe D	November 5, 2012
NY Times	Safe D	November 4, 2012
RCP	Safe D	November 4, 2012
The Hill	Safe D	November 4, 2012
