= 2008 United States House of Representatives elections in New Mexico =

- November 4, 2008

All 3 New Mexico seats to the United States House of Representatives
	Majority party	Minority party
Party	Democratic	Republican
Last election	1	2
Seats won	3	0
Seat change	▲2	▼2
Popular vote	457,135	321,083
Percentage	56.12%	39.42%
Swing	▲0.31%	▼4.75%

Democratic
40–50%
50–60%
60–70%
70–80%
Republican
40–50%
50–60%
60–70%

The 2008 congressional elections in New Mexico were held on November 4, 2008, to determine New Mexico's representation in the United States House of Representatives. The party primary elections were held June 3, 2008. Martin Heinrich, Harry Teague, and Ben Ray Luján, all Democrats, were elected to represent New Mexico in the House. Representatives are elected for two-year terms; the winners of the election currently serve in the 111th Congress, which began on January 4, 2009, and is scheduled to end on January 3, 2011. The election coincided with the 2008 U.S. presidential election and senatorial elections.

New Mexico has three seats in the House, apportioned according to the 2000 United States census. Its 2007-2008 congressional delegation consisted of two Republicans and one Democrat. All three incumbents chose to vie for New Mexico's open Senate seat being held by retiring Republican Pete Domenici. The election resulted in all three New Mexico seats are being occupied by freshman Democrats. Districts 1 and 2 changed from Republican to Democratic; CQ Politics had forecast that these seats might be at risk for the Republican Party. This was the last time that Democrats won all of New Mexico's congressional districts until the 2018 midterm elections. Incidentally, two of the three elected Representatives, Heinrich and Luján, now serve together in the United States Senate since 2021.

== Overview ==
United States House of Representatives elections in New Mexico, 2008
Party	Votes	Percentage	Seats	+/–
Democratic	457,135	56.12%	3	+2
Republican	321,083	39.42%	0	-2
Independents	36,348	4.46%	0	—
Totals	814,566	100.00%	13	—

=== Match-up summary ===
District	Incumbent	2008 Status	Democratic	Republican	Independents
1	Heather Wilson	Open	Martin Heinrich	Darren White	None
2	Steve Pearce	Open	Harry Teague	Edward R. Tinsley, III	None
3	Tom Udall	Open	Ben R. Luján	Dan East	Carol Miller

== District 1 ==
2008 New Mexico's 1st congressional district election

Nominee	Martin Heinrich	Darren White
Party	Democratic	Republican
Popular vote	163,622	131,284
Percentage	55.5%	44.5%
U.S. Representative before election
Heather Wilson
Republican
Elected U.S. Representative
Martin T. Heinrich
Democratic

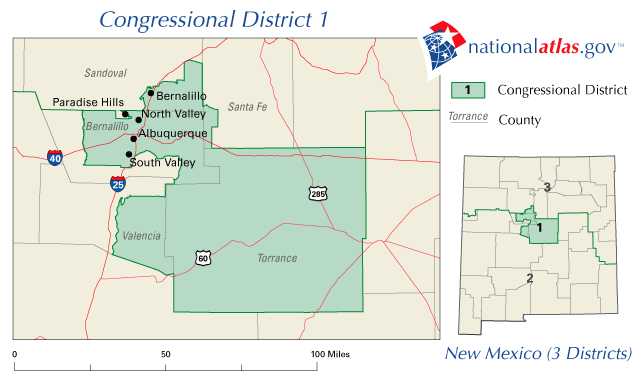

This district includes the central area of New Mexico, in and around Albuquerque. An open seat, CQ Politics forecast the race as 'No Clear Favorite'. The Rothenberg Political Report rated it 'Pure Toss-Up'. The Cook Political Report ranked it 'Lean Democratic'.

Martin Heinrich (D) (campaign website)
Darren White (R) (campaign website)

The 2006 race between incumbent Republican Heather Wilson and Democratic state Attorney General Patricia Madrid was a cliffhanger, with Wilson being reelected by 861 votes. John Kerry had narrowly won the district with 52% in 2004 (CPVI=D+2). With the retirement of longtime U.S. Senator Pete Domenici, Wilson ran and lost as a candidate for the Republican nomination in the race for an open U.S. Senate seat, leaving this an open seat. The Democratic nominee was Martin Heinrich (former Albuquerque City Councilor). The Republican nominee was Bernalillo County Sheriff Darren White. In the general election, Heinrich defeated White by a margin of 11%. When sworn into Congress in January 2009, Heinrich became the first Democrat to ever represent this district in the House.

- Race ranking and details from CQ Politics
- Campaign contributions from OpenSecrets
- White (R) vs Heinrich (D) graph of collected poll results from Pollster.com

=== Primary elections ===
2008 Democratic Primary Congressional Election, District 1
Party	Candidate	Votes	%	±%
Democratic	Martin T. Heinrich	22,344	44%	
Democratic	Rebecca D. Vigil-Giron	12,659	25%	
Democratic	Michelle Lujan Grisham	12,073	24%	
Democratic	Robert L. Pidcock	4,272	8%	
Majority		9,685		
Turnout		51,348		

2008 Republican Primary Congressional Election, District 1
Party	Candidate	Votes	%	±%
Republican	Darren White	57,878	88%	
Republican	Joseph J. Carraro	8,244	12%	
Majority		49,634		
Turnout		66,122		

=== General election ===
==== Predictions ====
Source	Ranking	As of
The Cook Political Report	Lean D (flip)	November 6, 2008
Rothenberg	Lean D (flip)	November 2, 2008
Sabato's Crystal Ball	Lean D (flip)	November 6, 2008
Real Clear Politics	Lean D (flip)	November 7, 2008
CQ Politics	Tossup	November 6, 2008

2008 General Congressional Election, District 1
Party	Candidate	Votes	%	±%
Democratic	Martin T. Heinrich	163,622	55.5%	
Republican	Darren White	131,284	44.5%	
Majority		32,338	11%	
Turnout		294,906		

== District 2 ==
2008 New Mexico's 2nd congressional district election

Nominee	Harry Teague	Edward R. Tinsley III
Party	Democratic	Republican
Popular vote	127,640	101,084
Percentage	55.8%	44.2%
U.S. Representative before election
Steve Pearce
Republican
Elected U.S. Representative
Harry Teague
Democratic

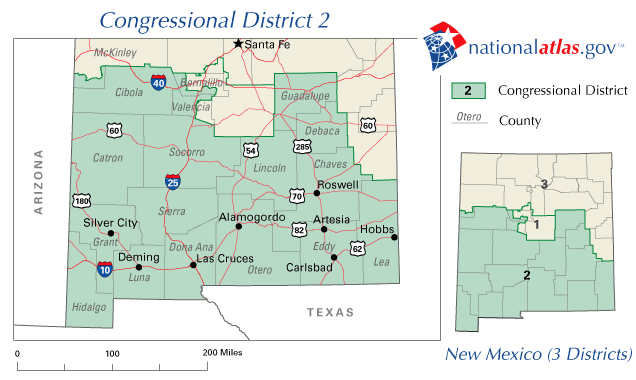

This district covers the southern half of the state of New Mexico, including Las Cruces and Roswell. CQ Politics forecast the race as 'Leans Republican'. The Rothenberg Political Report rated it 'Pure Toss-Up'. The Cook Political Report ranked it 'Republican Toss Up'.

Republican incumbent Steve Pearce won his party's nomination over Heather Wilson for the U.S. Senate, leaving this an open seat. This district usually votes Republican. George W. Bush won the district 58% to 42% over John Kerry in 2004 (CPVI=R+6). Nevertheless, Democratic nominee Harry Teague defeated Republican Edward R. Tinsely III in the general election and became the first Democrat to represent this district since 1981.

- Race ranking and details from CQ Politics
- Campaign contributions from OpenSecrets

=== Candidates ===
Harry Teague

Democratic nominee for U.S. Representative for New Mexico, 2nd District
- Election date November 4, 2008
- Opponent(s): Edward Roy Tinsley, III (R)
- Incumbent: Steve Pearce (R)

Personal details
- Party: Democratic
- Spouse: Nancy
- Occupation: small business owner
- Website: harryforcongress.com

Edward R. Tinsley, III

Republican nominee for U.S. Representative for New Mexico, 2nd District
- Election date November 4, 2008
- Opponent: Harry Teague (D)
- Incumbent: Steve Pearce (R)

Personal details
- Born: Lamesa, Dawson County, Texas
- Party: Republican
- Spouse: Meredith George Tinsley
- Education: University of Texas; Texas Tech University
- Occupation: Franchisor of K-Bob's Steakhouse; Rancher, Lawyer
- Website: www.edtinsleyforcongress.com

Harry Teague (D)
Teague is a Hobbs business owner, civic leader and former Lea County Commissioner.

- Harry Teague for Congress official campaign website
- Financial information (federal office) at the Federal Election Commission
- Profile at Vote Smart

Edward R. Tinsley III (R)
Tinsley is a restaurateur.

- Ed Tinsley for Congress official campaign website
- Financial information (federal office) at the Federal Election Commission
- Profile at Vote Smart

=== Primary elections ===
2008 Democratic Primary Congressional Election, District 2
Party	Candidate	Votes	%	±%
Democratic	Harry Teague	20,206	52%	
Democratic	Bill McCamley	18,489	48%	
Majority		1,717		
Turnout		38,695		

2008 Republican Primary Congressional Election, District 2
Party	Candidate	Votes	%	±%
Republican	Edward R. Tinsley III	11,469	32%	
Republican	Monty Newman	7,476	21%	
Republican	Aubrey Dunn	7,331	20%	
Republican	Greg Sowards	6,427	18%	
Republican	C. Earl Greer	3,606	10%	
Majority		3,993		
Turnout		36,309		

=== General election ===
==== Predictions ====
Source	Ranking	As of
The Cook Political Report	Tossup	November 6, 2008
Rothenberg	Lean D (flip)	November 2, 2008
Sabato's Crystal Ball	Lean D (flip)	November 6, 2008
Real Clear Politics	Tossup	November 7, 2008
CQ Politics	Tossup	November 6, 2008

2008 General Congressional Election, District 2
Party	Candidate	Votes	%	±%
Democratic	Harry Teague	127,640	55.8%	
Republican	Edward R. Tinsley III	101,084	44.2%	
Majority		26,556	11.6%	
Turnout		228,724		

== District 3 ==
2008 New Mexico's 3rd congressional district election

Nominee	Ben Ray Luján	Daniel East	Carol Miller
Party	Democratic	Republican	Independent
Popular vote	158,548	85,969	35,789
Percentage	56.6%	30.7%	12.8%
U.S. Representative before election
Tom Udall
Democratic
Elected U.S. Representative
Ben Ray Luján
Democratic

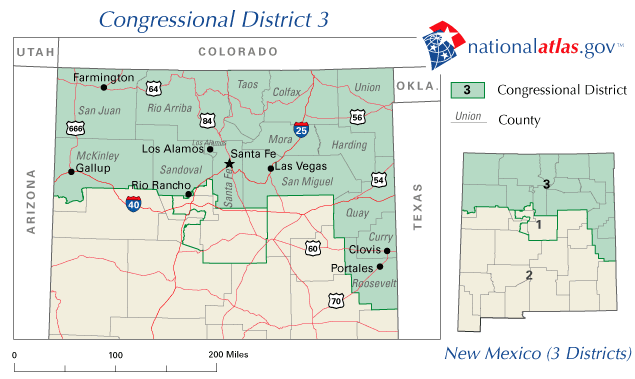

This district covers the northern half of the state of New Mexico, including the capital, Santa Fe. An open seat, CQ Politics forecast the race as 'Safe Democrat', as did The Rothenberg Political Report and The Cook Political Report.

- Dan East (R)
- Ben R. Luján (D)
- Carol Miller (I)

Democratic incumbent Tom Udall won his party's nomination for Pete Domenici's open U.S. Senate seat. The Democrats tend to hold the advantage in the district: John Kerry received 54% of the vote there (CPVI=D+6) in 2004. The Democratic nominee was State Public Regulation Commissioner Ben R. Luján. Luján's father serves as Speaker of the New Mexico House of Representatives. The Republican nominee was small business owner Dan East. Carol Miller, a 1997/1998 Green Party candidate, was seeking the seat as an independent. Luján won the three-way race fairly easily and was sworn into Congress in January 2009.

- Dan East's campaign website
- Ben R. Luján's campaign website
- Carol Miller's campaign website
- Race ranking and details from CQ Politics
- Campaign contributions from OpenSecrets

=== Primary elections ===
2008 Democratic Primary Congressional Election, District 3
Party	Candidate	Votes	%	±%
Democratic	Ben R. Luján	26,776	42%	
Democratic	Don Wiviott	16,497	26%	
Democratic	Benny J. Shendo Jr	10,148	16%	
Democratic	Harry Montoya	7,234	11%	
Democratic	Jon Adams	1,979	3%	
Democratic	Rudy Martin	1,845	3%	
Majority		10,279		
Turnout		64,479		

2008 Republican Primary Congressional Election, District 3
Party	Candidate	Votes	%	±%
Republican	Daniel East	14,767	54%	
Republican	Marco Gonzales	12,634	46%	
Majority		2,133		
Turnout		27,401		

=== General election ===
==== Predictions ====
Source	Ranking	As of
The Cook Political Report	Safe D	November 6, 2008
Rothenberg	Safe D	November 2, 2008
Sabato's Crystal Ball	Safe D	November 6, 2008
Real Clear Politics	Safe D	November 7, 2008
CQ Politics	Safe D	November 6, 2008

2008 General Congressional Election, District 3
Party	Candidate	Votes	%	±%
Democratic	Ben Ray Luján	158,548	56.6%	
Republican	Daniel East	85,969	30.7%	
Independent	Carol Miller	35,789	12.8%	
Majority		72,579	25.9%	
Turnout		280,306		

Preceded by 2006 elections	United States House elections in New Mexico; 2008	Succeeded by 2010 elections
