= 2010 United States House of Representatives elections in New Mexico =

- November 2, 2010

All 3 New Mexico seats to the United States House of Representatives
	Majority party	Minority party
Party	Democratic	Republican
Last election	3	0
Seats won	2	1
Seat change	▼1	▲1
Popular vote	307,766	288,885
Percentage	51.58%	48.42%
Swing	▼4.54%	▲9.00%

Democratic
50–60%
60–70%
70–80%
80–90%
Republican
50–60%
60–70%
70–80%

The 2010 congressional elections in New Mexico were held on November 2, 2010, and determined New Mexico's representation in the United States House of Representatives. Representatives are elected for two-year terms; the winners of the election served in the 111th Congress, which began on January 4, 2009, ended on January 3, 2011.

New Mexico has three seats in the House, apportioned according to the 2000 United States census. Its 2009–2011 congressional delegation consisted of three Democrats and no Republicans, which changed to two Democrats and one Republican after the 2010 election.

== Overview ==
United States House of Representatives elections in New Mexico, 2010
Party	Votes	Percentage	Seats	+/–
Democratic	307,766	51.58%	2	-1
Republican	288,885	48.42%	1	+1
Totals	596,651	100.00%	3	—

=== By district ===
Results of the 2010 United States House of Representatives elections in New Mexico by district:

District	Democratic		Republican		Others		Total		Result
District	Votes	%	Votes	%	Votes	%	Votes	%	Result
District 1	112,010	51.80%	104,215	48.20%	0	0.00%	216,225	100%	Democratic Hold
District 2	75,708	44.60%	94,053	55.40%	0	0.00%	169,761	100%	Republican Gain
District 3	120,048	56.99%	90,617	43.01%	0	0.00%	210,665	100%	Democratic Hold
Total	307,766	51.58%	288,885	48.42%	0	0.00%	596,651	100%	

== District 1 ==
2010 New Mexico's 1st congressional district election

Nominee	Martin Heinrich	Jon Barela
Party	Democratic	Republican
Popular vote	112,010	104,215
Percentage	51.8%	48.2%
U.S. Representative before election
Martin Heinrich
Democratic
Elected U.S. Representative
Martin Heinrich
Democratic

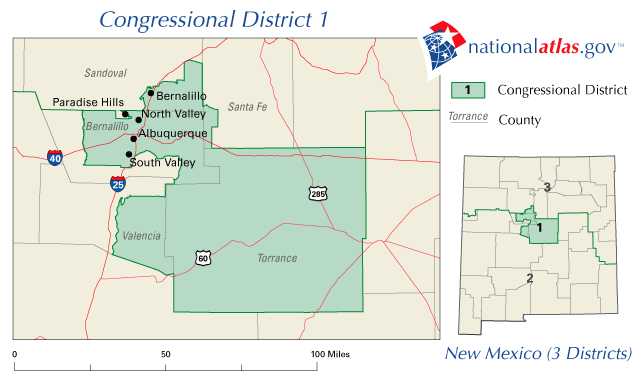

=== Campaign ===
First elected in 2008, incumbent Democratic Congressman Martin Heinrich ran for re-election for the first time this year. This moderate district, based in metro Albuquerque, has a tendency of supporting both Republican and Democratic candidates for office. In the general election, Congressman Heinrich faced Jon Barela, the Republican nominee for the seat and a former high-ranking official in the New Mexico Republican Party. Barela hammered at Heinrich for being "too far left" for what he described as a "center-right seat". The Albuquerque Journal endorsed Jon Barela in the general election, citing the fact that he "would boost the economy by nurturing predictability for investors and job creators" and urging New Mexico voters to vote for a candidate who would "[help] restore balance to Congress and [place] an emphasis on people over government programs to right the ship." Polling indicated that the race would be close, and on election day, Heinrich won a second term by nearly a four-point margin and 8,000 votes.

=== Polling ===
Poll Source	Dates Administered	Martin Heinrich (D)	Jon Barela (R)	Undecided
Research and Polling Inc.	October 27–28, 2010	46%	49%	–
Public Opinion Strategies†	October 24–25, 2010	47%	49%	–
Research and Polling Inc.	September 27–30, 2010	48%	41%	–
Public Policy Polling	September 25–26, 2010	50%	43%	7%
American Action Forum	August 23–29, 2010	49%	42%	9%
Research and Polling Inc.	August 23–27, 2010	47%	41%	12%
Survey USA	July 22–25, 2010	45%	51%	4%
Greenberg Quinlan Rosner Research†	July 8–13, 2010	53%	41%	–
Greenberg Quinlan Rosner Research†	April 28 – May 2, 2010	55%	38%	–
Public Policy Polling	February 25, 2010	45%	36%	19%

†Internal poll (Greenberg Quinlan Rosner Research for the Heinrich campaign and Public Opinion Strategies for the Barela campaign)

==== Predictions ====
Source	Ranking	As of
The Cook Political Report	Tossup	November 1, 2010
Rothenberg	Tossup	November 1, 2010
Sabato's Crystal Ball	Lean D	November 1, 2010
RCP	Tossup	November 1, 2010
CQ Politics	Lean D	October 28, 2010
New York Times	Lean D	November 1, 2010
FiveThirtyEight	Lean D	November 1, 2010

=== Results ===
New Mexico's 1st congressional district election, 2010
Party	Candidate	Votes	%
Democratic	Martin Heinrich (incumbent)	112,010	51.80
Republican	Jon Barela	104,215	48.20
Total votes		216,225	100.00
Democratic hold			

== District 2 ==
2010 New Mexico's 2nd congressional district election
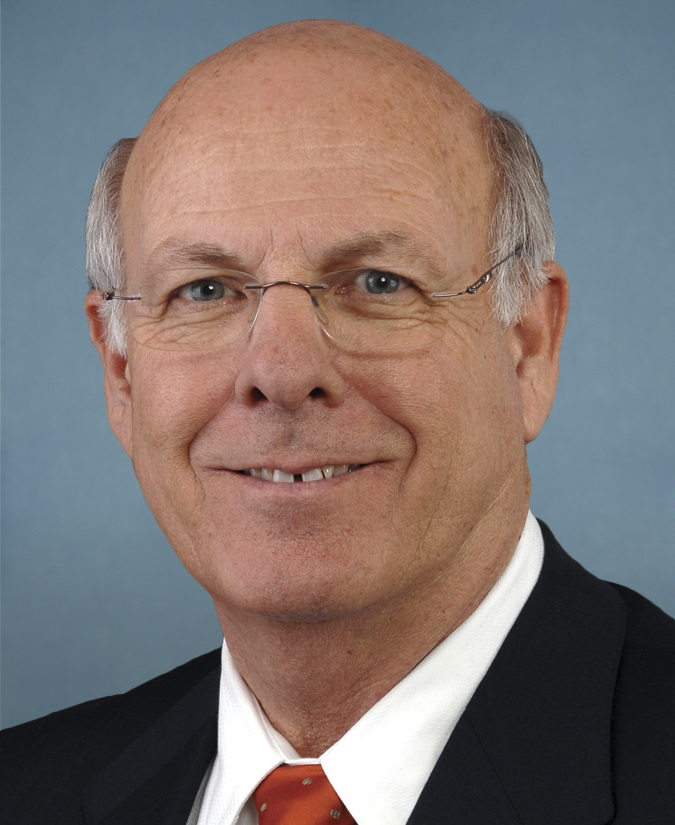

Nominee	Steve Pearce	Harry Teague
Party	Republican	Democratic
Popular vote	94,053	75,708
Percentage	55.4%	44.6%
- County results Pearce: 50–60% 60–70% 70–80% Teague: 50–60% 60–70% 70–80%
U.S. Representative before election
Harry Teague
Democratic
Elected U.S. Representative
Steve Pearce
Republican

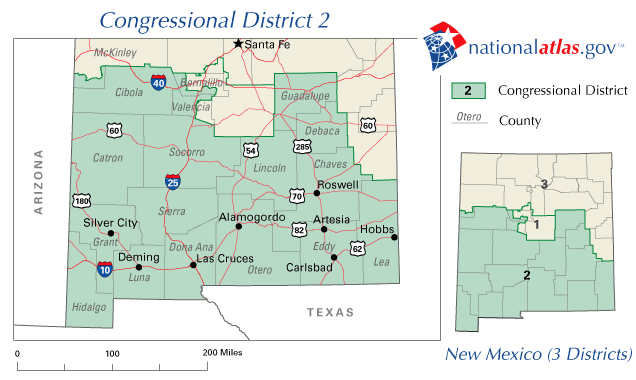

=== Campaign ===
This conservative-leaning district, which has historically supported Republican candidates for higher office, has been represented by moderate Democratic Congressman Harry Teague since he was first elected two years prior. The previous Congressman, Republican Steve Pearce, retired in 2008 to run for Senate, a race that he lost. Coming off from a large electoral defeat at the hands of Democrat Tom Udall, the former Congressman Pearce re-entered the political sphere and challenged Congressman Teague when he sought election to a second congressional term. A tough campaign ensued, with Pearce taking the lead in most polls. Pearce's advantage widened when the Democratic Congressional Campaign Committee announced that it was shifting resources from the 2nd district to the 1st district, a decision that the Pearce campaign responded, "The DCCC is realizing what we knew all along. Voters do not want the Teague-Pelosi agenda of out-of-control spending and lost jobs." In late October, Congressman Teague declined to participate in a debate with Steve Pearce, giving Pearce solo airtime that was broadcast statewide and providing some observers with evidence that Teague was essentially conceding defeat to Pearce. As political prognosticators indicated, on election day, Pearce defeated the incumbent Congressman and returned to Washington for his fourth nonconsecutive term.

=== Polling ===
Poll Source	Dates Administered	Harry Teague (D)	Steve Pearce (R)	Undecided
Research and Polling Inc.	October 27–28, 2010	45%	48%	–
Tarrance Group†	October 19–20, 2010	41%	50%	9%
The Hill/ANGA	September 28–30, 2010	42%	46%	10%
Research and Polling Inc.	September 27–30, 2010	44%	45%	–
Public Policy Polling	September 25–26, 2010	47%	48%	5%
Anzalone Liszt Research	September 7–9, 2010	51%	44%	–
Research and Polling Inc.	August 23–27, 2010	45%	42%	–
Hamilton Campaigns†	April 6–8, 2010	47%	46%	8%
Public Policy Polling	February 25, 2010	41%	43%	16%
Tarrance Group (Link)†	February 16–18, 2010	44%	48%	8%
Hamilton Campaigns†	August, 2009	42%	52%	6%

†Internal poll (Hamilton Campaigns polls commissioned by Teague; Tarrance Group poll for Pearce)

==== Predictions ====
Source	Ranking	As of
The Cook Political Report	Lean R (flip)	November 1, 2010
Rothenberg	Lean R (flip)	November 1, 2010
Sabato's Crystal Ball	Lean R (flip)	November 1, 2010
RCP	Lean R (flip)	November 1, 2010
CQ Politics	Tossup	October 28, 2010
New York Times	Lean R (flip)	November 1, 2010
FiveThirtyEight	Likely R (flip)	November 1, 2010

=== Results ===
New Mexico's 2nd congressional district election, 2010
Party	Candidate	Votes	%
Republican	Steve Pearce	94,053	55.40
Democratic	Harry Teague (incumbent)	75,708	44.60
Total votes		169,761	100.00
Republican gain from Democratic			

== District 3 ==
2010 New Mexico's 3rd congressional district election

Nominee	Ben Ray Luján	Thomas Mullins
Party	Democratic	Republican
Popular vote	120,048	90,617
Percentage	57.0%	43.0%
- County results Lujan: 50–60% 70–80% 80–90% Mullins: 50–60% 60–70% 70–80%
U.S. Representative before election
Ben Ray Luján
Democratic
Elected U.S. Representative
Ben Ray Luján
Democratic

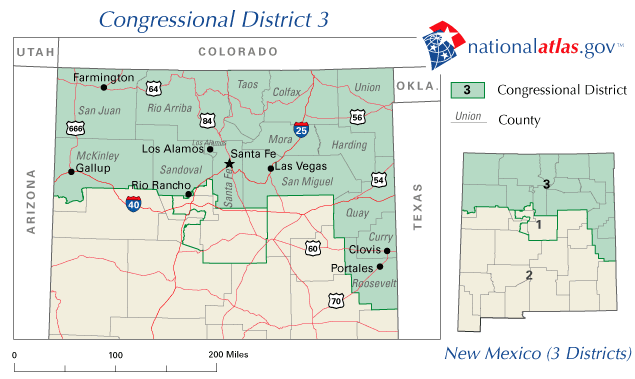

=== Campaign ===
Incumbent Democratic Congressman Ben Ray Luján has represented this liberal district based in northern New Mexico since he was first elected in 2008 to replace outgoing Democratic Congressman Tom Udall, who successfully ran for Senate. Seeking a second term, Congressman Luján faced Republican businessman Tom Mullins in the general election. The Albuquerque Journal endorsed Mullins, praising his plans to "trim federal spending" and "help the private sector create jobs...[by] lowering taxes." Despite this, however, Luján was able to use the district's natural liberal leanings to his advantage and won re-election to a second term in Congress.

=== Republican primary ===
New Mexico U.S. House District 3 Republican primary, 2010
Party	Candidate	Votes	%
Republican	Thomas E. Mullins	23,301	71.32
Republican	Adam Kokesh	9,372	28.68
Total votes		32,673	100

=== Polling ===
Poll Source	Dates Administered	Ben R. Luján (D)	Tom Mullins (R)	Undecided
Public Policy Polling	September 25–26, 2010	49%	43%	8%
Public Policy Polling	February 25, 2010	42%	36%	22%

==== Predictions ====
Source	Ranking	As of
The Cook Political Report	Likely D	November 1, 2010
Rothenberg	Safe D	November 1, 2010
Sabato's Crystal Ball	Safe D	November 1, 2010
RCP	Lean D	November 1, 2010
CQ Politics	Safe D	October 28, 2010
New York Times	Safe D	November 1, 2010
FiveThirtyEight	Safe D	November 1, 2010

=== Results ===
New Mexico's 3rd congressional district election, 2010
Party	Candidate	Votes	%
Democratic	Ben Ray Luján (incumbent)	120,048	56.99
Republican	Thomas Mullins	90,617	43.01
Total votes		210,665	100.00
Democratic hold			
