= Ben Ray Luján =

American politician (born 1972)

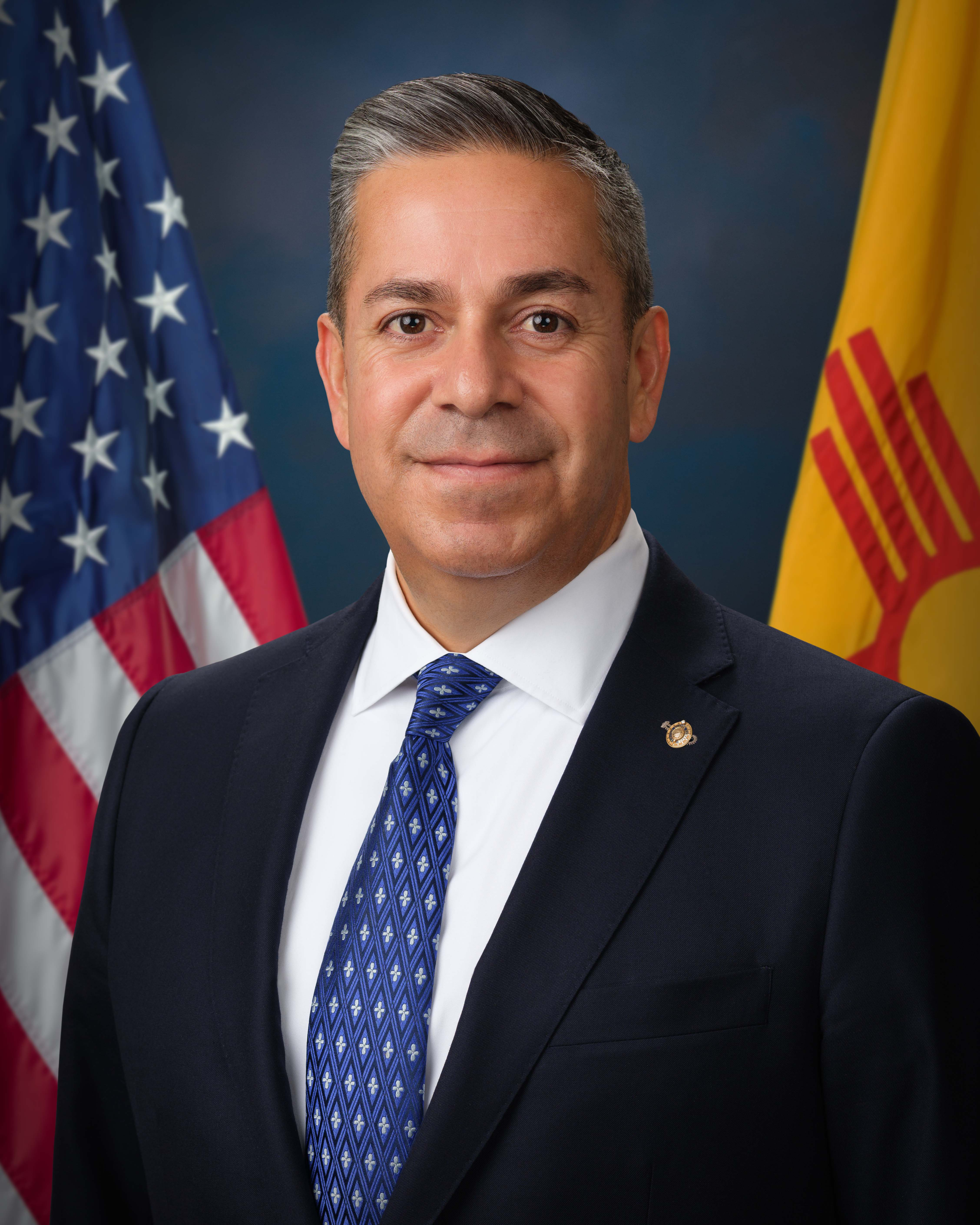
- Official portrait, 2025

United States Senator from New Mexico
- Incumbent
- Assumed office January 3, 2021 Serving with Martin Heinrich
- Preceded by: Tom Udall

Assistant Speaker of the United States House of Representatives
- In office January 3, 2019 – January 3, 2021
- Leader: Nancy Pelosi
- Preceded by: Jim Clyburn (Assistant Democratic Leader)
- Succeeded by: Katherine Clark

Chair of the Democratic Congressional Campaign Committee
- In office January 3, 2015 – January 3, 2019
- Leader: Nancy Pelosi
- Preceded by: Steve Israel
- Succeeded by: Cheri Bustos

Member of the U.S. House of Representatives from New Mexico's 3rd district
- In office January 3, 2009 – January 3, 2021
- Preceded by: Tom Udall
- Succeeded by: Teresa Leger Fernandez

Member of the New Mexico Public Regulation Commission from the 3rd district
- In office January 3, 2005 – January 3, 2009
- Preceded by: Jerome Block
- Succeeded by: Jerome Block Jr.

Personal details
- Born: June 7, 1972 (age 54) Santa Fe, New Mexico, U.S.
- Party: Democratic
- Relatives: Ben Luján (father)
- Education: University of New Mexico (attended); New Mexico Highlands University (BBA)
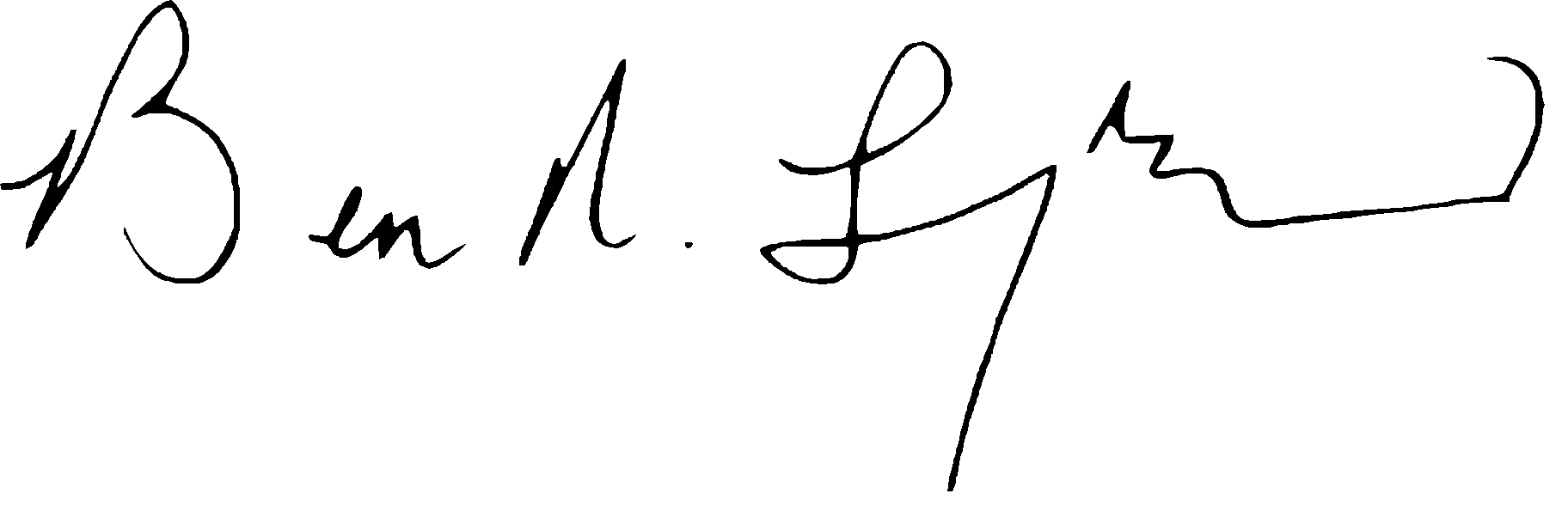
- Signature
- Website: Senate website Campaign website
- Luján's voice Luján supporting Deb Haaland's confirmation as United States Secretary of the Interior. Recorded March 15, 2021

Ben Ray Luján (/luːˈhɑːn/ loo-HAHN; born June 7, 1972) is an American politician serving since 2021 as the junior United States senator from New Mexico. From 2009 to 2021, he represented New Mexico's 3rd congressional district in the U.S. House of Representatives; he served as assistant speaker (Note: As "House Assistant Democratic Leader") from 2019 to 2021. Luján is a self-described progressive Democrat.

Before being elected to Congress, Luján served as a member of the New Mexico Public Regulation Commission from 2005 to 2008, where he was also chairman. He and Senator Martin Heinrich are the co-deans of New Mexico's congressional delegation. Luján served as chairman of the Democratic Congressional Campaign Committee from 2014 to 2019; Democrats won a House majority in the 2018 elections. In his role as assistant House Democratic leader, Luján was the highest-ranking Hispanic in Congress.

In 2020, Luján was elected to the Senate. He was reelected in 2026.

== Early life and education ==
Ben Ray Luján was born in Santa Fe, New Mexico, the last child of Carmen Luján and Ben Luján; he has two older sisters and an older brother. He was raised in Nambe, New Mexico. His mother's maiden name was also Luján. His father, Ben, went into politics in 1970, when he was elected to the County Commission; beginning in 1975, he was a longtime member of the New Mexico House of Representatives, serving as majority whip and speaker.

After graduating from Pojoaque Valley High School in 1990, Ben Ray Luján worked as a blackjack dealer at a tribal casino. After that, he attended the University of New Mexico and received a Bachelor of Business Administration from New Mexico Highlands University.

== Early career ==
=== Public Regulation Commission ===
Luján was elected to the New Mexico Public Regulation Commission in November 2004. He represented PRC district 3 which encompasses northeastern, north central and central New Mexico. His served as chairman of the PRC in 2005, 2006 and 2007. His term on the PRC ended at the end of 2008. He helped to increase the Renewable Portfolio Standard in New Mexico that requires utilities to use 20 percent of their energy from renewable sources by 2020. Luján also required utilities to diversify their renewable use to include solar, wind and biomass.

Luján joined regulators in California, Oregon, and Washington to sign the Joint Action Framework on Climate Change to implement regional solutions to global warming.

== U.S. House of Representatives ==
=== Elections ===
==== 2008 ====
In 2008, Luján ran to succeed U.S. Representative Tom Udall in New Mexico's 3rd congressional district. Udall gave up the seat to make what would be a successful bid for the United States Senate. On June 3, 2008, Luján won the Democratic primary, defeating five other candidates. His closest competitor, developer Don Wiviott, received 26 percent to Luján's 42 percent.

Luján faced Republican Dan East and independent Carol Miller in the general election and won with 57% of the vote to East's 30% and Miller's 13%.

==== 2010 ====
Luján won reelection against Republican nominee Thomas E. Mullins with 56.99% of the vote.

==== 2012 ====
Luján won reelection against Republican nominee Jefferson Byrd with 63.12% of the vote.

==== 2014 ====
Luján won reelection against Byrd again, with 61.52% of the vote.

==== 2016 ====
Luján won reelection against Republican nominee Michael H. Romero with 62.42% of the vote.

==== 2018 ====
Luján won reelection against Republican nominee Jerald Steve McFall with 63.4% of the vote.

=== Tenure ===
Luján has been a proponent of health care reform, including a public option. In October 2009, he gave a speech on the House floor calling for a public option to be included in the House health care bill.

In June 2009, Luján voted for an amendment that would require the U.S. Secretary of Defense to present a plan including a complete exit strategy for Afghanistan by the end of the year. The amendment did not pass. In September 2009, Luján wrote a letter urging the Obama administration not to increase the number of troops in Afghanistan. In his letter, he drew on conversations he had with General Stanley A. McChrystal and Afghan President Hamid Karzai.

In 2011, Luján was a co-sponsor of Bill H.R. 3261, the Stop Online Piracy Act.

==== Energy policy ====
According to his campaign website, Luján has been active in environmental regulation. He chairs the Congressional Hispanic Caucus's Green Economy and Renewable Energy Task Force. Luján has initiated several pieces of legislation regarding renewable energy such as the SOLAR Act. He co-authored the Community College Energy Training Act of 2009. He also supports natural gas usage and the New Alternative Transportations to Give Americans Solutions Act of 2009. Luján has high ratings from interest groups such as Environment America and the Sierra Club.

Luján serves on the bipartisan Congressional PFAS Task Force. He has introduced legislation to provide relief to communities and businesses impacted by PFAS/PFOA contamination in groundwater around Air Force bases in New Mexico and across the country.

In addition to supporting the Green New Deal, an economic stimulus package that aims to address climate change and economic inequality, Luján has developed legislation to put the United States on a path to net zero carbon emission and address climate change.

==== Education policy ====
Luján has been supported by the National Education Association. He supported the American Recovery and Reinvestment Act and student loan reform. He cosponsored the STEM Education Coordination Act in an effort to produce more scientists and innovators in the United States.

==== Native American issues ====
Luján has supported increased funding for the Bureau of Indian Affairs and Indian Health Service. He opposed the Stop the War on Coal Act of 2012 and was in favor of preserving sacred Native American ground. Luján worked to create legislation enabling tribes to directly request disaster assistance from the president. Luján's district contains 15 separate Pueblo tribes as well as tribal lands of the Jicarilla Apache Nation and Navajo Nation. In February 2009, Luján introduced a series of five water accessibility bills that, along with improving access to water for the many communities in the district, would also give federal funds to Indian tribes. Along with Harry Teague (D-NM) and Ann Kirkpatrick (D-AZ), Luján sponsored an amendment to the House health care bill that would extend the current Indian Health Care system until 2025. Tribal governments were major donors to his 2012 reelection campaign.

=== Committee assignments ===
- Committee on Energy and Commerce
  - Subcommittee on Communications and Technology
  - Subcommittee on Health
  - Subcommittee on Digital Commerce and Consumer Protection
- Select Committee on the Climate Crisis

=== Caucus memberships ===
- Congressional Arts Caucus
- Congressional Hispanic Caucus

== U.S. Senate ==
=== Elections ===
==== 2020 ====
On April 1, 2019, Luján announced he was running to succeed retiring Senator Tom Udall in the 2020 election. On June 2, 2020, Luján won the Democratic primary unopposed. In the general election, he defeated Republican nominee Mark Ronchetti, 51.7% to 45.6%.

=== Tenure ===
==== 117th Congress (2021–2023) ====
Luján was sworn into the Senate on January 3, 2021. He was accompanied by the outgoing Senator, Tom Udall.

On January 6, 2021, Luján was participating in the certification of the 2021 United States Electoral College vote count when Trump supporters stormed the U.S. Capitol. He called the attack a "siege" and "a direct attack on our nation's democracy." In the wake of the attack, Luján said he would vote to convict Trump "for inciting an insurrection."

Luján was absent from the Senate while recovering from a major stroke in early 2022.

==== Energy ====
In February 2021, Luján was one of seven Democratic senators to join Republicans in blocking a ban of hydraulic fracturing, commonly known as "fracking".

==== Foreign policy ====
In January 2024, Luján voted for a resolution, proposed by Bernie Sanders, to apply the human rights provisions of the Foreign Assistance Act to U.S. aid to Israel's military. The proposal was defeated, 72 to 11.

==== Immigration ====
In January 2026, after federal immigration agents fatally shot Renée Good and Alex Pretti in Minneapolis, Luján announced he would vote against the Department of Homeland Security funding bill. He wrote, "with multiple deadly shootings of American citizens by federal agents in Minnesota and no accountability, I will not support an appropriations bill that funds DHS without real oversight, transparency, and consequences." Luján called for a full and independent investigation into Pretti's shooting and demanded the resignation or firing of Homeland Security Secretary Kristi Noem and White House Deputy Chief of Staff Stephen Miller. His position aligned with fellow New Mexico Senator Martin Heinrich, who separately introduced legislation to redirect ICE funding to local law enforcement agencies.

=== Committee assignments ===
Luján served on the following Senate committees in the 118th United States Congress:

- Committee on Agriculture, Nutrition & Forestry
  - Subcommittee on Commodities, Risk Management, and Trade
  - Subcommittee on Conservation, Climate, Forestry, and Natural Resources
  - Subcommittee on Rural Development and Energy
- Committee on the Budget
- Committee on Commerce, Science and Transportation
  - Subcommittee on Communications, Media, and Broadband (Chair)
  - Subcommittee on Consumer Protection, Product Safety, and Data Security
  - Subcommittee on Oceans, Fisheries, Climate Change and Manufacturing
  - Subcommittee on Space and Science
- Committee on Health, Education, Labor and Pensions
  - Subcommittee on Employment and Workplace Safety
  - Subcommittee on Primary Health and Retirement Security
- Committee on Indian Affairs

== Personal life ==
Luján is a Catholic.

=== Health ===
On January 27, 2022, Luján was hospitalized in Santa Fe after feeling fatigued and dizzy. He was found to have had a stroke affecting his cerebellum and was transferred to the University of New Mexico Hospital for treatment, which included a decompressive craniectomy. A statement from his office said that "he is expected to make a full recovery". Luján returned to work at the Senate on March 3 and stated by April 21 that he was 90% recovered.

== Electoral history ==
2008 Democratic Primary Congressional Election, District 3
Party	Candidate	Votes	%
Democratic	Ben Ray Luján	26,667	41.58
Democratic	Don Wiviott	16,314	25.44
Democratic	Benny J. Shendo Jr.	10,113	15.77
Democratic	Harry Montoya	7,205	11.23
Democratic	Jon Adams	1,993	3.11
Democratic	Rudy Martin	1,838	2.87

2008 New Mexico's 3rd congressional district election
Party	Candidate	Votes	%
Democratic	Ben Ray Luján	161,292	56.74
Republican	Daniel K. East	86,618	30.47
Independent	Carol Miller	36,348	12.79
Total votes		284,258	100.00
Democratic hold			

2010 New Mexico's 3rd congressional district election
Party	Candidate	Votes	%
Democratic	Ben Ray Luján (Incumbent)	120,057	56.99
Republican	Thomas E. Mullins	90,621	43.01
Total votes		210,678	100.00
Democratic hold			

2012 New Mexico's 3rd congressional district election
Party	Candidate	Votes	%
Democratic	Ben Ray Luján (Incumbent)	167,103	63.12
Republican	Jefferson L. Byrd	97,616	36.88
Total votes		264,719	100.00
Democratic hold			

2014 Democratic Primary Congressional Election, New Mexico's 3rd District
Party	Candidate	Votes	%
Democratic	Ben R. Luján (incumbent)	50,709	87.6
Democratic	Robert Blanch	7,207	12.4
Total votes		57,916	100.0

2014 New Mexico's 3rd congressional district election
Party	Candidate	Votes	%
Democratic	Ben Ray Luján (Incumbent)	113,249	61.52
Republican	Jefferson Byrd	70,775	38.45
Republican	Thomas Hook (Write-In)	52	0.03
Total votes		184,076	100.00
Democratic hold			

-->

2016 New Mexico's 3rd congressional district election
Party	Candidate	Votes	%
Democratic	Ben Ray Luján (Incumbent)	170,612	62.42
Republican	Michael H. Romero	102,730	37.58
Total votes		273,342	100.00
Democratic hold			

2018 New Mexico's 3rd congressional district election
Party	Candidate	Votes	%
Democratic	Ben Ray Luján (Incumbent)	155,201	63.04
Republican	Jerald S. McFall	76,427	31.02
Libertarian	Christopher Manning	13,265	5.4
Total votes		244,893	100.00
Democratic hold			

2020 United States Senate election in New Mexico
Party	Candidate	Votes	%	±%
Democratic	Ben Ray Luján	474,483	51.73%	−3.83%
Republican	Mark Ronchetti	418,483	45.62%	+1.18%
Libertarian	Bob Walsh	24,271	2.65%	N/A
Total votes		917,237	100.0%	N/A
Democratic hold				

== See also ==
- List of Hispanic and Latino Americans in the United States Congress

== Notes ==
U.S. House of Representatives
Preceded by Tom Udall	Member of the U.S. House of Representatives from New Mexico's 3rd congressional district 2009–2021	Succeeded by Teresa Leger Fernandez
Party political offices
Preceded by Steve Israel	Chair of the Democratic Congressional Campaign Committee; 2015–2019	Succeeded by Cheri Bustos
Preceded by Jim Clyburn as House Assistant Democratic Leader	Assistant Speaker of the House of Representatives; 2019–2021	Succeeded by Katherine Clark
Preceded by Tom Udall	Democratic nominee for U.S. Senator from New Mexico (Class 2); 2020, 2026	Most recent
U.S. Senate
Preceded by Tom Udall	U.S. Senator (Class 2) from New Mexico; 2021–present Served alongside: Martin Heinrich	Incumbent
U.S. order of precedence (ceremonial)
Preceded by Cynthia Lummis	Order of precedence of the United States as United States Senator	Succeeded by Jon Ossoff
Preceded by Mark Kelly	United States senators by seniority 70th	Succeeded by Cynthia Lummis
