= 2026 United States Senate election in New Mexico =

- November 3, 2026

| Nominee | Ben Ray Luján | Larry Marker |
| Party | Democratic | Republican |
| Popular vote | 458,756 | 266,434 |
| Percentage | 63.26% | 36.74% |
- Luján: 50–60% 60–70% 70–80% 80–90% Marker: 50–60% 60–70%
U.S. senator before election
Ben Ray Luján
Democratic
Elected U.S. senator
Ben Ray Luján
Democratic

The 2026 United States Senate election in New Mexico was held on November 3, 2026, to elect a member of the United States Senate to represent the state of New Mexico. Democratic incumbent Ben Ray Luján was re-elected to a second term, defeating Republican former oil and gas operator Larry Marker.

Primary elections were held on June 2. Luján won the Democratic nomination with 83.7% of the vote against minimal opposition. After no Republicans qualified for the primary ballot, Marker was nominated as a write-in candidate.

== Democratic primary ==
Ben Ray Luján, a member of the Luján political family, was elected in 2020 after serving as the representative for the 3rd congressional district from 2009 until 2021. During his tenure in the Senate, Luján has been an outspoken critic of Donald Trump, having voted in line with Trump's stated position only 5% of the time. Luján was widely considered the favorite in the primary election.

Luján's sole opponent in the primary was Matt Dodson, a U.S. Air Force veteran from Farmington. A self-described democratic socialist, Dodson had previously ran unsuccessfully for local and state offices. Originally failing to achieve the 20% threshold of votes in the Democratic Party convention, he qualified for the ballot through signature collection.

Dodson was suspended from the state Democratic Party, and had previously accused San Juan County party chair Mary Schildmeyer of embezzling funds. He denied the allegations, and charges were dropped due to lack of evidence. On April 8, 2026, Dodson was arrested in Otero County after blocking the entrance road to Holloman Air Force Base during an anti-drone warfare protest. He was released two days later.

=== Candidates ===
==== Nominee ====
- Ben Ray Luján, incumbent U.S. senator (2021–present)

==== Eliminated in primary ====
- Matt Dodson, USAF veteran

=== Endorsements ===
Ben Ray Luján

Labor unions

- American Federation of Government Employees

Organizations

- J Street
- Jewish Democratic Council of America
- Joint Action Committee for Political Affairs
- League of Conservation Voters
- Latino Victory
- Planned Parenthood Action Fund
- Population Connection

Newspapers

- The Santa Fe New Mexican

=== Fundraising ===
Campaign finance reports as of March 31, 2026
| Candidate | Raised | Spent | Cash on hand |
|---|---|---|---|
| Ben Ray Luján (D) | $7,309,462 | $3,212,864 | $4,175,921 |
| Matt Dodson (D) | $11,843 | $8,069 | $3,774 |
Source: Federal Election Commission

=== Polling ===
| Poll source | Date(s) administered | Sample size (Note: Key: A – all adults RV – registered voters LV – likely voters V – unclear) | Margin of error | Matt Dodson | Ben Ray Luján | Undecided |
|---|---|---|---|---|---|---|
| Research & Polling Inc. (Note: Poll conducted for the Albuquerque Journal) | April 17–24, 2026 | 534 (LV) | ± 4.2% | 9% | 69% | 22% |

=== Results ===
Primary results by county: Luján: 70–80%; 80–90%; >90%

Democratic primary results
| Party | Candidate | Votes | % |
|---|---|---|---|
| Democratic | Ben Ray Luján (incumbent) | 182,360 | 84.2 |
| Democratic | Matt Dodson | 34,289 | 15.8 |
| Total votes | | 216,649 | 100.0 |

== Republican primary ==
Christopher Heuvel, the only Republican to file for the race, was disqualified for failing to meet the requirements to appear on the ballot. The Republican Party had an opportunity to field a prospective candidate until March 17 to collect the signatures needed to qualify for the nomination as a write-in, which was successfully done by former oil and gas operator Larry Marker. Marker received the 2,351 write-in votes in the primary required to advance to the general election.

=== Candidates ===
==== Nominee ====
- Larry Marker, former oil and gas operator (write-in)

==== Disqualified ====
- Christopher Heuvel

==== Declined ====
- Nella Domenici, former CFO of Bridgewater Associates, daughter of former U.S. Senator Pete Domenici, and nominee for U.S. Senate in 2024

=== Results ===
Republican primary results
| Party | Candidate | Votes | % |
|---|---|---|---|
| Republican | Larry Marker (write-in) | 31,220 | 100.0 |
| Total votes | | 31,220 | 100.0 |

== Third parties ==
=== Candidates ===
==== Did not qualify ====
- Rhett Trappman (Libertarian)
- Bob Perls (Forward), former state representative from the 44th district (1993–1996)
- Cameron Chick (Independent)
- Mira O'Connell (Independent), law enforcement veteran

==== Disqualified ====
- Toby Smith (Jewish/Christian National Party) (used fake address on forms)

== General election ==
=== Predictions ===
| Source | Ranking | As of |
|---|---|---|
| The Cook Political Report | Solid D | November 2, 2026 |
| Decision Desk HQ | Safe D | November 3, 2026 |
| The Economist (Note: The Economist's prediction model uses unconventional terminology. For the purpose of equivalency, their "Very Likely" ratings are formatted as a "Likely" rating while "Likely" ratings are formatted as a "Lean" rating.) | Safe D | November 3, 2026 |
| FiftyPlusOne | Safe D | November 3, 2026 |
| Fox News | Solid D | November 1, 2026 |
| Inside Elections | Solid D | October 29, 2026 |
| MS NOW | Safe D | October 29, 2026 |
| NBC News | Solid D | November 3, 2026 |
| RealClearPolitics | Likely D | November 2, 2026 |
| Sabato's Crystal Ball | Safe D | November 2, 2026 |
| Silver Bulletin | Solid D | November 3, 2026 |
| Split Ticket | Safe D | November 2, 2026 |

=== Post-primary endorsements ===
Ben Ray Luján (D)

Labor unions

- National Education Association

Organizations

- Reproductive Freedom for All

=== Fundraising ===
Campaign finance reports as of October 14, 2026
| Candidate | Raised | Spent | Cash on hand |
|---|---|---|---|
| Ben Ray Luján (D) | $9,111,371 | $6,347,418 | $2,843,276 |
| Larry Marker (R) | $99,230 | $90,122 | $88 |
Source: Federal Election Commission

=== Polling ===
Aggregate polls

| Source of poll aggregation | Dates administered | Dates updated | Ben Ray Luján (D) | Larry Marker (R) | Other/ Undecided (Note: Calculated by taking the difference of 100% and all other candidates combined.) | Margin |
|---|---|---|---|---|---|---|
| 270toWin | September 25 – November 2, 2026 | November 2, 2026 | 57.0% | 38.0% | 5.0% | Luján +19.0% |
| Silver Bulletin | through November 2, 2026 | November 3, 2026 | 55.3% | 37.4% | 7.3% | Luján +17.0% |
| Average | | | 56.2% | 37.7% | 6.1% | Luján +18.5% |

| Poll source | Date(s) administered | Sample size | Margin of error | Ben Ray Luján (D) | Larry Marker (R) | Undecided |
|---|---|---|---|---|---|---|
| Research Co. | October 31 – November 2, 2026 | 450 (LV) | ± 4.6% | 56% | 37% | 7% |
| Research & Polling Inc. | October 1–9, 2026 | 1,125 (LV) | ± 2.9% | 53% | 37% | 10% |
| SurveyUSA (Note: Poll sponsored by KOB-TV) | September 25–30, 2026 | 567 (LV) | ± 5.1% | 54% | 36% | 10% |
| Research & Polling Inc. | August 21–28, 2026 | 516 (LV) | ± 4.3% | 53% | 38% | 9% |

=== Results ===
2026 United States Senate election in New Mexico
| Party | Candidate | Votes | % | ±% |
|---|---|---|---|---|
| Democratic | Ben Ray Luján (incumbent) | 458,756 | 63.26 | +11.53 |
| Republican | Larry Marker | 266,434 | 36.74 | –8.88 |
| Total votes | | 725,190 | 100.0 | |
| Democratic hold | | | | |

Counties that flipped from Republican to Democratic

- Colfax (largest municipality: Raton)
- Hidalgo (largest municipality: Lordsburg)
- Luna (largest municipality: Deming)
- Valencia (largest municipality: Los Lunas)

==== By congressional district ====
Luján won all three congressional districts.

| District | Luján | Marker | Elected Representative |
|---|---|---|---|
| 1st | 63.72% | 36.28% | Melanie Stansbury |
| 2nd | 61.57% | 38.43% | Gabe Vasquez |
| 3rd | 64.24% | 35.76% | Teresa Leger Fernández |

== Notes ==
Partisan and media clients
