= 2020 United States Senate election in New Mexico =

- November 3, 2020
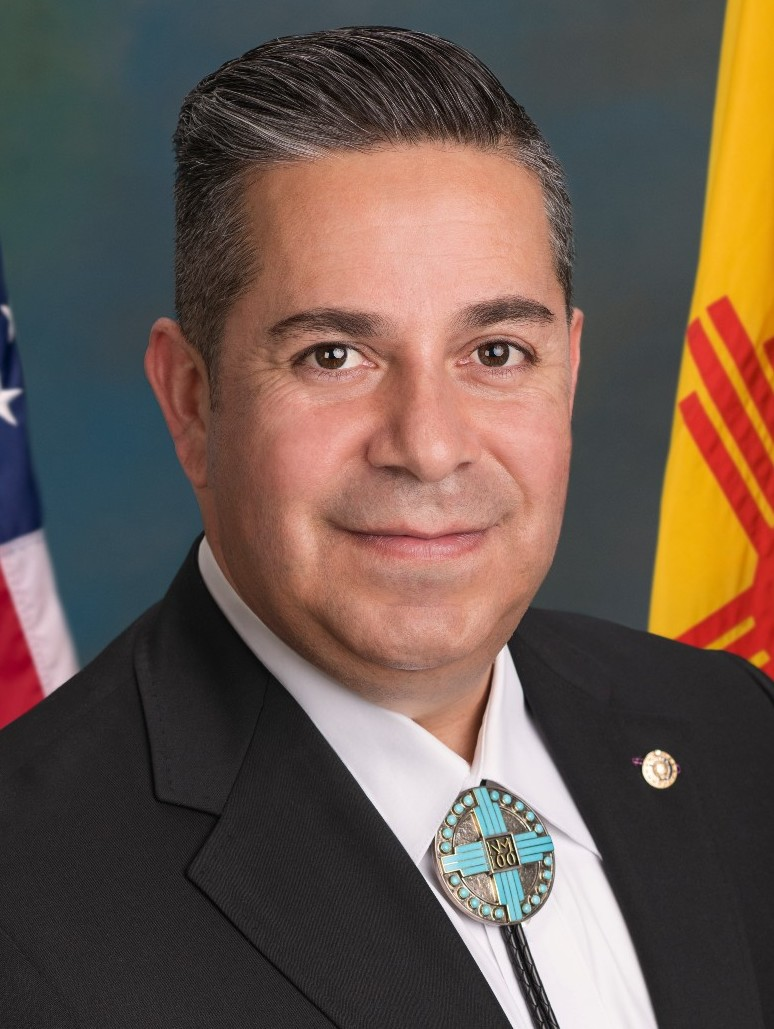

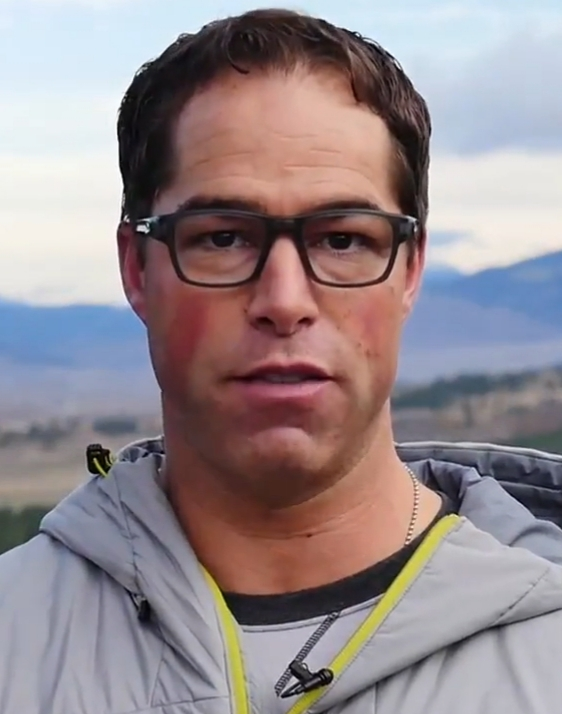
Nominee	Ben Ray Luján	Mark Ronchetti
Party	Democratic	Republican
Popular vote	474,483	418,483
Percentage	51.73%	45.62%
- Luján: 40–50% 50–60% 60–70% 70–80% 80–90% >90% Ronchetti: 40–50% 50–60% 60–70% 70–80% 80–90% >90% Tie: 40–50% No data
U.S. senator before election
Tom Udall
Democratic
Elected U.S. Senator
Ben Ray Luján
Democratic

The 2020 United States Senate election in New Mexico was held on November 3, 2020, to elect a member of the United States Senate to represent the State of New Mexico, concurrently with the 2020 U.S. presidential election, as well as other elections to the United States Senate in other states, elections to the United States House of Representatives, and various state and local elections.

On March 25, 2019, incumbent Democratic Senator Tom Udall announced that he would retire. Udall was the only Democratic senator who did not run for reelection in 2020. Democratic U.S. Representative Ben Ray Luján defeated Mark Ronchetti by a 6.1% margin. Luján underperformed Democratic presidential nominee Joe Biden by 4.6%, who won the concurrent presidential election in the state against President Donald Trump by 10.8%. Luján was the first Hispanic to have won a Senate seat in New Mexico since Joseph Montoya in 1970.

== Democratic primary ==
=== Candidates ===
==== Nominee ====
- Ben Ray Luján, U.S. representative for New Mexico's 3rd congressional district

==== Withdrew ====
- Giovanni Haqani, businessman, television host, and candidate for state representative in 2016
- Andrew Perkins, accountant and former Española finance director
- Maggie Toulouse Oliver, secretary of state of New Mexico (endorsed Ben Ray Luján)

==== Declined ====
- Jeff Apodaca, businessman and candidate for governor in 2018
- Hector Balderas, Attorney General of New Mexico
- Terry Brunner, former United States Department of Agriculture regional director
- Pete Campos, state senator
- Jacob Candelaria, state senator
- Joe Cervantes, state senator and candidate for governor in 2018
- Brian Egolf, speaker of the New Mexico House of Representatives
- Deb Haaland, U.S. representative (endorsed Ben Ray Luján); (running for re-election)
- Tim Keller, mayor of Albuquerque
- Michelle Lujan Grisham, Governor of New Mexico (endorsed Ben Ray Luján)
- Howie Morales, Lieutenant Governor of New Mexico
- Valerie Plame, former CIA operations officer
- Jeff Steinborn, state senator
- Xochitl Torres Small, U.S. representative
- Raúl Torrez, Bernalillo County district attorney (running for re-election)
- Tom Udall, incumbent U.S. senator (endorsed Ben Ray Luján)
- Alan Webber, mayor of Santa Fe

=== Endorsements ===
Ben Ray Luján

Federal officials

- Deb Haaland, U.S. representative (NM)
- Martin Heinrich, U.S. senator (NM)
- Amy Klobuchar, U.S. senator (MN)
- Nancy Pelosi, Speaker of the United States House of Representatives (CA-12)
- Tom Udall, U.S. senator (NM)

State and local politicians

- Diane Denish, former lieutenant governor of New Mexico
- Michelle Lujan Grisham, Governor of New Mexico
- Patricia Madrid, former attorney general of New Mexico
- Maggie Toulouse Oliver, Secretary of State of New Mexico

Labor unions

- American Federation of State, County and Municipal Employees
- New Mexico Professional Fire Fighters Association

Organizations

- Animal Protection Voters
- Brady Campaign
- Council for a Livable World
- Democratic Senatorial Campaign Committee
- DUH! Demand Universal Healthcare
- End Citizens United
- Giffords
- Human Rights Campaign
- Humane Society of the United States Legislative Fund
- J Street PAC
- League of Conservation Voters
- NARAL Pro-Choice America
- National Organization for Women
- Planned Parenthood Action Fund
- Sierra Club

=== Polling ===
Poll source	Date(s) administered	Sample size (Note: Key: A – all adults RV – registered voters LV – likely voters V – unclear)	Margin of error	Ben Ray Luján	Maggie Toulouse Oliver	Undecided
GBAO Strategies (D) (Note: Poll sponsored by Luján's campaign.)	April 15–18, 2019	600 (LV)	± 4.0%	64%	25%	–

=== Results ===
Democratic primary results
Party	Candidate	Votes	%
Democratic	Ben Ray Luján	225,082	100.00%
Total votes		225,082	100.00%

== Republican primary ==
=== Candidates ===
==== Nominee ====
- Mark Ronchetti, former KRQE chief meteorologist

==== Eliminated in primary ====
- Gavin Clarkson, former professor at New Mexico State University and nominee for New Mexico Secretary of State in 2018
- Elisa Martinez, member of the Navajo Nation and executive director of the New Mexico Alliance for Life

==== Withdrawn ====
- Rick Montoya, businessman
- Mick Rich, businessman and nominee for the U.S. Senate in 2018
- Louie Sanchez, indoor shooting range owner

==== Declined ====
- Rod Adair, former state senator
- Richard J. Berry, former mayor of Albuquerque
- Kevin DuPriest, businessman, data scientist
- Kelly Fajardo, state representative
- Nate Gentry, minority leader of the New Mexico House of Representatives
- Michael Hendricks, attorney and nominee for Attorney General in 2018
- Yvette Herrell, former state representative and nominee for New Mexico's 2nd congressional district in 2018 (Herrell is running for U.S. House of Representatives CD2)
- David Hyder, Valencia County Commissioner
- Steve Maestas, real estate developer
- Sarah Maestas Barnes, former state representative
- Susana Martinez, former governor of New Mexico
- Mark Moores, state senator
- Judith Nakamura, New Mexico Supreme Court justice
- Steve Pearce, chair of the New Mexico Republican Party, former U.S. representative, nominee for the U.S. Senate in 2008, and nominee for governor in 2018
- John Sanchez, former lieutenant governor of New Mexico

=== Polling ===
Poll source	Date(s) administered	Sample size	Margin of error	Gavin Clarkson	Elisa Martinez	Mark Ronchetti	Undecided
Public Opinion Strategies (R) (Note: Poll sponsored by Ronchetti's campaign)	March 18–22, 2020	400 (V)	± 4.9%	11%	11%	45%	–

=== Results ===
Results by county: Ronchetti: 40–50%; 50–60%; 60–70%; 70–80%; Martinez: 30–40%; 40–50%

Republican primary results
Party	Candidate	Votes	%
Republican	Mark Ronchetti	89,216	56.49%
Republican	Elisa Martinez	41,240	26.11%
Republican	Gavin Clarkson	27,471	17.39%
Total votes		157,927	100.00%

== Other candidates ==
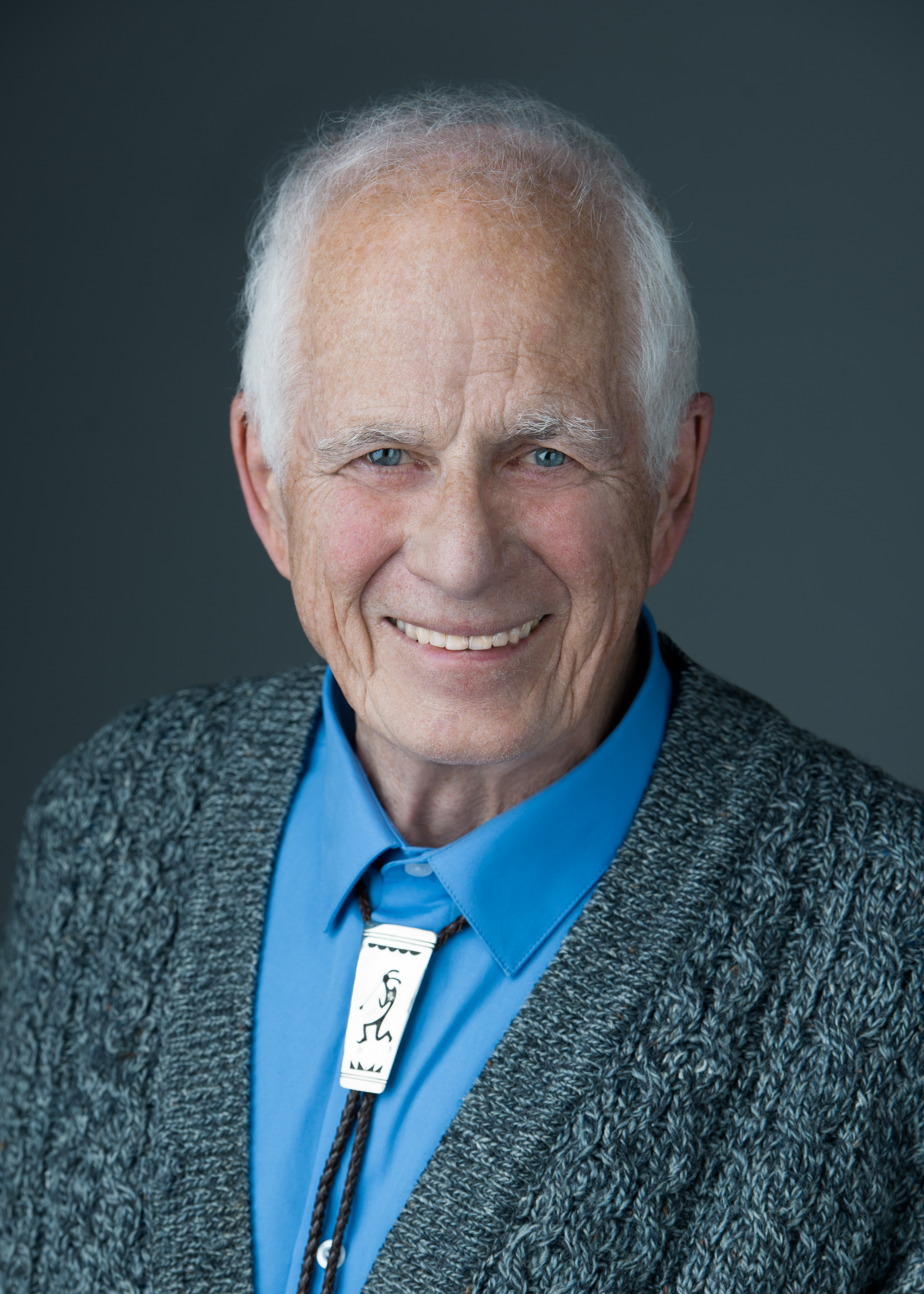
Bob Walsh, the Libertarian nominee

=== Libertarian Party ===
==== Nominee ====
- Bob Walsh, nuclear safety scientist

==== Declined ====
- Gary Johnson, former governor of New Mexico and nominee for U.S. Senate in 2018

==== Results ====
Libertarian primary results
Party	Candidate	Votes	%
Libertarian	Bob Walsh	1,454	100.00%
Total votes		1,454	100.00%

== General election ==
=== Debate ===
Host	Date & time	Link(s)	Participants		
Host	Date & time	Link(s)	Ben Ray Luján (D)	Mark Ronchetti (R)	Bob Walsh (L)
KOB4 and the Santa Fe New Mexican	October 5, 2020		Present	Present	Present

=== Predictions ===
Source	Ranking	As of
The Cook Political Report	Safe D	October 29, 2020
Inside Elections	Safe D	October 28, 2020
Sabato's Crystal Ball	Likely D	November 2, 2020
Daily Kos	Safe D	October 30, 2020
Politico	Likely D	November 2, 2020
RCP	Lean D	October 23, 2020
DDHQ	Safe D	November 3, 2020
538	Likely D	November 2, 2020
Economist	Likely D	November 2, 2020

=== Post-primary endorsements ===
Ben Ray Luján (D)

Executive branch officials

- Barack Obama, former president of the United States (2009–2017)

U.S. senators

- Kamala Harris, California (2017–2021)

Labor unions

- New Mexico Federation of Labor (AFL-CIO)
- Teamsters Local 492
- United Auto Workers

Organizations

- American Nurses Association
- Center for Biological Diversity
- Congressional Black Caucus
- Everytown for Gun Safety
- Indivisible
- Joint Action Committee for Political Affairs
- Latino Victory Project
- National Association of Social Workers
- National Education Association
- Natural Resources Defense Council Action Fund
- Population Connection
- Progressive Turnout Project
Mark Ronchetti (R)

Individuals

- Gavin Clarkson, former professor at New Mexico State University and nominee for New Mexico Secretary of State in 2018; former candidate
- Elisa Martinez, member of the Navajo Nation and executive director of the New Mexico Alliance for Life; former candidate

Publications

- Albuquerque Journal

=== Polling ===
Poll source	Date(s) administered	Sample size	Margin of error	Ben Ray Luján (D)	Mark Ronchetti (R)	Bob Walsh (L)	Undecided
Research & Polling Inc.	October 23–29, 2020	1,180 (LV)	± 2.9%	52%	44%	3%	1%
GBAO Strategies (D)	October 14–17, 2020	600 (LV)	± 4.0%	52% (Note: Standard VI response)	41%	5%	–
GBAO Strategies (D)	October 14–17, 2020	600 (LV)	± 4.0%	54% (Note: If only Luján and Ronchetti were candidates)	43%	–	–
Public Policy Polling	September 30 – October 1, 2020	886 (LV)	± 3.3%	51%	41%	3%	6%
Research & Polling Inc.	August 26 – September 2, 2020	1,123 (LV)	± 2.9%	49%	40%	4%	8%
Public Policy Polling	June 12–13, 2020	740 (V)	± 3.6%	48%	34%	–	18%

Hypothetical polling

Ben Ray Luján vs. Gavin Clarkson

Poll source	Date(s) administered	Sample size	Margin of error	Ben Ray Luján (D)	Gavin Clarkson (R)	Undecided
Emerson College	January 3–6, 2020	967 (RV)	± 3.1%	54%	35%	12%

Generic Democrat vs. generic Republican

Poll source	Date(s) administered	Sample size	Margin of error	Generic Democrat	Generic Republican
GBAO Strategies (D)	October 14–17, 2020	600 (LV)	± 4.0%	54%	42%

=== Results ===
United States Senate election in New Mexico, 2020
Party	Candidate	Votes	%	±%
Democratic	Ben Ray Luján	474,483	51.73%	–3.83%
Republican	Mark Ronchetti	418,483	45.62%	+1.18%
Libertarian	Bob Walsh	24,271	2.65%	N/A
Total votes		917,237	100.00%	N/A
Democratic hold				

==== By county ====
By county

County	Ben Ray Luján Democratic		Mark Ronchetti Republican		Bob Walsh Libertarian		Margin		Total votes
County	#	%	#	%	#	%	#	%	Total votes
Bernalillo	178,880	56.69	128,042	40.58	8,606	2.73	50,838	16.11	315,528
Catron	543	23.55	1,694	73.46	69	2.99	-1,151	-49.91	2,306
Chaves	6,143	27.62	15,624	70.25	475	2.14	-9,481	-42.63	22,242
Cibola	4,478	50.48	4,187	47.20	205	2.31	291	3.28	8,870
Colfax	2,549	42.35	3,314	55.06	156	2.59	-765	-12.71	6,019
Curry	4,261	28.57	10,094	67.67	561	3.76	-5,833	-39.10	14,916
De Baca	228	25.25	653	72.31	22	2.44	-425	-47.06	903
Doña Ana	46,920	57.57	31,697	38.89	2,889	3.54	15,223	18.68	81,506
Eddy	5,301	23.21	17,079	74.77	463	2.03	-11,778	-51.56	22,843
Grant	7,377	51.45	6,610	46.10	352	2.45	767	5.35	14,339
Guadalupe	1,240	56.96	898	41.25	39	1.79	342	15.71	2,177
Harding	157	31.21	341	67.79	5	0.99	-184	-36.58	503
Hidalgo	798	41.35	1,085	56.22	47	2.43	-287	-14.87	1,930
Lea	4,018	19.62	15,950	77.90	508	2.48	-11,932	-58.27	20,476
Lincoln	2,915	28.45	7,102	69.31	230	2.24	-4,187	-40.86	10,247
Los Alamos	7,018	57.06	4,866	39.56	415	3.37	2,152	17.50	12,299
Luna	3,426	43.00	4,319	54.21	222	2.79	-893	-11.21	7,967
McKinley	17,081	65.21	8,304	31.70	807	3.08	8,777	33.51	26,192
Mora	1,674	62.32	957	35.63	55	2.05	717	26.69	2,686
Otero	7,987	34.24	14,627	62.70	715	3.06	-6,640	-28.46	23,329
Quay	1,214	31.55	2,543	66.09	91	2.36	-1,329	-34.54	3,848
Rio Arriba	10,614	64.04	5,689	34.32	271	1.63	4,925	29.72	16,574
Roosevelt	1,774	27.16	4,505	68.98	252	3.86	-2,731	-41.82	6,531
Sandoval	37,782	49.52	36,666	48.06	1,841	2.41	1,116	1.46	76,289
San Juan	17,250	33.18	33,145	63.76	1,588	3.05	-15,895	-30.58	51,983
San Miguel	7,817	67.85	3,545	30.77	159	1.38	4,272	37.08	11,521
Santa Fe	60,432	73.87	19,814	24.22	1,563	1.91	40,618	49.65	81,809
Sierra	2,127	35.93	3,653	61.71	140	2.36	-1,526	-25.78	5,920
Socorro	3,529	49.54	3,384	47.51	210	2.95	145	2.03	7,123
Taos	12,890	75.92	3,749	22.08	340	2.00	9,141	53.84	16,979
Torrance	2,179	29.98	4,904	67.48	184	2.53	-2,725	-37.50	7,267
Union	399	22.50	1,323	74.62	51	2.88	-924	-52.12	1,773
Valencia	13,344	41.53	18,053	56.19	730	2.27	-4,709	-14.66	32,127
Totals	474,483	51.73	418,483	45.62	24,271	2.65	56,000	6.11	917,237

Counties that flipped from Democratic to Republican

- Colfax (largest municipality: Raton)
- Harding (largest municipality: Roy)
- Hidalgo (largest municipality: Lordsburg)
- Luna (largest municipality: Deming)
- Valencia (largest municipality: Los Lunas)

==== By congressional district ====
Ray Luján won two of three congressional districts.

District	Ray Luján	Ronchetti	Representative
1st	56%	41%	Deb Haaland
2nd	42%	55%	Xochitl Torres Small
2nd	42%	55%	Yvette Herrell
3rd	56%	42%	Ben Ray Luján
3rd	56%	42%	Teresa Leger Fernandez

== See also ==
- 2020 New Mexico elections

== Notes ==
Partisan clients

Voter samples
