= Harry Teague =

American politician (born 1949)

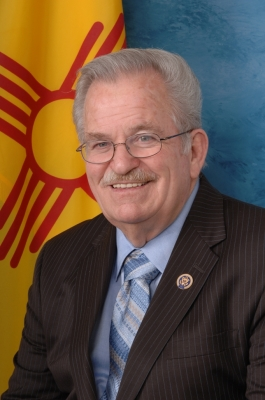

Member of the U.S. House of Representatives from New Mexico's 2nd district
- In office January 3, 2009 – January 3, 2011
- Preceded by: Steve Pearce
- Succeeded by: Steve Pearce

Personal details
- Born: Troy Harry Teague; June 29, 1949 (age 77) Gracemont, Oklahoma, U.S.
- Party: Democratic
- Spouse: Nancy Teague

Troy Harry Teague (born June 29, 1949) is an American former oilman and politician who served as the U.S. representative for New Mexico's 2nd congressional district, from 2009 until 2011. He is a member of the Democratic Party.

The district is located in the southern part of the state and includes Hobbs, Roswell, Carlsbad, Las Cruces and the southern fourth of Albuquerque.

== Early life, education and career ==
Teague grew up in an impoverished family of sharecroppers and lived the first nine years of his life in rural central Oklahoma without running water. His family moved to Hobbs, New Mexico when he was nine years old. He attended Hobbs High School but dropped out at the age of 17 to work in the oil fields to support his sick parents. He is married to Nancy Teague and has two children and five grandchildren. Teague is a small business owner of a company that now employs 250 people and is a member of the New Mexico Oil and Gas Association.

== Early political career ==
Teague was elected as a Democrat to the Republican-controlled Lea County Board of Commissioners. He served on the Board for eight years, and was elected chairman by his fellow Board members for three and a half of those years.

== U.S. House of Representatives ==
=== Elections ===
2008

In 2008, Republican incumbent Steve Pearce of the 2nd congressional district declined to run for re-election, instead unsuccessfully seeking the U.S. Senate seat left open by the retirement of Pete Domenici. Teague ran for the Democratic nomination against Bill McCamley, winning with 52 percent of the primary vote. The winner of the five-way Republican primary was Edward R. Tinsley, a Capitan rancher and the owner of the K-Bob's Steakhouse restaurant chain.

Although the 2nd has historically been the most conservative district in New Mexico, polls showed the race to be very competitive. Ultimately, Teague won in the general election with 56 percent of the vote to Tinsley's 44 percent. He received strong support from the western side of the district, as well as from its large Latino population. Teague and the Democratic Party outspent Tinsley and the Republican Party by over $3 million in the 2008 campaign.

His victory returned the 2nd to the Democrats for the first time in 28 years.

2010

November 2, 2010, Teague lost his Seat to former Republican congressman and business owner Steve Pearce, with Teague receiving 45% of the vote, and Pearce receiving 55%.

=== Tenure ===
Early in the 111th Congress, Teague introduced legislation that would modify the Internal Revenue Code of 1986 by providing for the refundability of the child tax credit for five years and extending credit for electricity produced using certain renewable resources. This legislation has been referred to the House Ways and Means Committee.

Teague is a co-sponsor of the Southwest Border Violence Reduction Act of 2009, which would direct the United States Attorney General to expand resources for the Bureau of Alcohol, Tobacco, Firearms, and Explosives initiative to identify, investigate, and prosecute firearms trafficking across the U.S. border with Mexico. The bill has been referred to both the House Committee on the Judiciary and the House Committee on Foreign Affairs.

On January 28, 2009, the House agreed to an amendment, proposed by Teague, to the American Recovery and Reinvestment Act of 2009. The amendment requires the Recovery.gov website to have links to job information at public agencies receiving funding under the bill and at private firms contracted to perform work under the bill. Later that day, the House voted, 244–188, to pass the Act.

Teague was one of 39 Democrats in the House to vote against the Affordable Healthcare for America Act and he also voted against the reconciled bill from the Senate language on March 21, 2010.

In June 2009, Teague voted for the American Clean Energy and Security Act. At a meeting that occurred following the vote, a group of Tea Party activists disrupted the meeting because they were upset that Teague was meeting with constituents on a one-on-one basis, and to express their frustration with the vote. A 2009 Pew Environment Group poll had found that 69% of voters in New Mexico's 2nd district would support an energy bill that mandated electric utilities to generate 20% of their electricity from renewable sources and reduce carbon emissions.

=== Committee assignments ===
- Committee on Transportation and Infrastructure
  - Subcommittee on Railroads, Pipelines, and Hazardous Materials
  - Subcommittee on Water Resources and Environment
- Committee on Veterans' Affairs
  - Subcommittee on Economic Opportunity
  - Subcommittee on Health

== Post-congressional career ==
In 2020, Teague endorsed Republican Yvette Herrell in the congressional race for his former seat, over Democratic incumbent Xochitl Torres Small. Herrell ultimately defeated Torres Small in the general election.

== Electoral results ==
2008 United States House of Representatives elections in New Mexico: District 2
Party	Candidate	Votes	%
Democratic	Harry Teague	129,572	55.96
Republican	Edward R. Tinsley	101,980	44.04
Total votes		231,552	100.0
Democratic gain from Republican			

2010 United States House of Representatives elections in New Mexico: District 2
Party	Candidate	Votes	%
Republican	Steve Pearce	94,053	55.40
Democratic	Harry Teague (Incumbent)	75,709	44.60
Total votes		169,762	100.0
Republican gain from Democratic			

U.S. House of Representatives
Preceded by Steve Pearce	Member of the U.S. House of Representatives from New Mexico's 2nd congressional district 2009–2011	Succeeded by Steve Pearce
U.S. order of precedence (ceremonial)
Preceded by Kendra Horn as Former U.S. Representative	Order of precedence of the United States as Former U.S. Representative	Succeeded by Xochitl Torres Small as Former U.S. Representative
