= 2008 United States Senate election in New Mexico =

- November 4, 2008
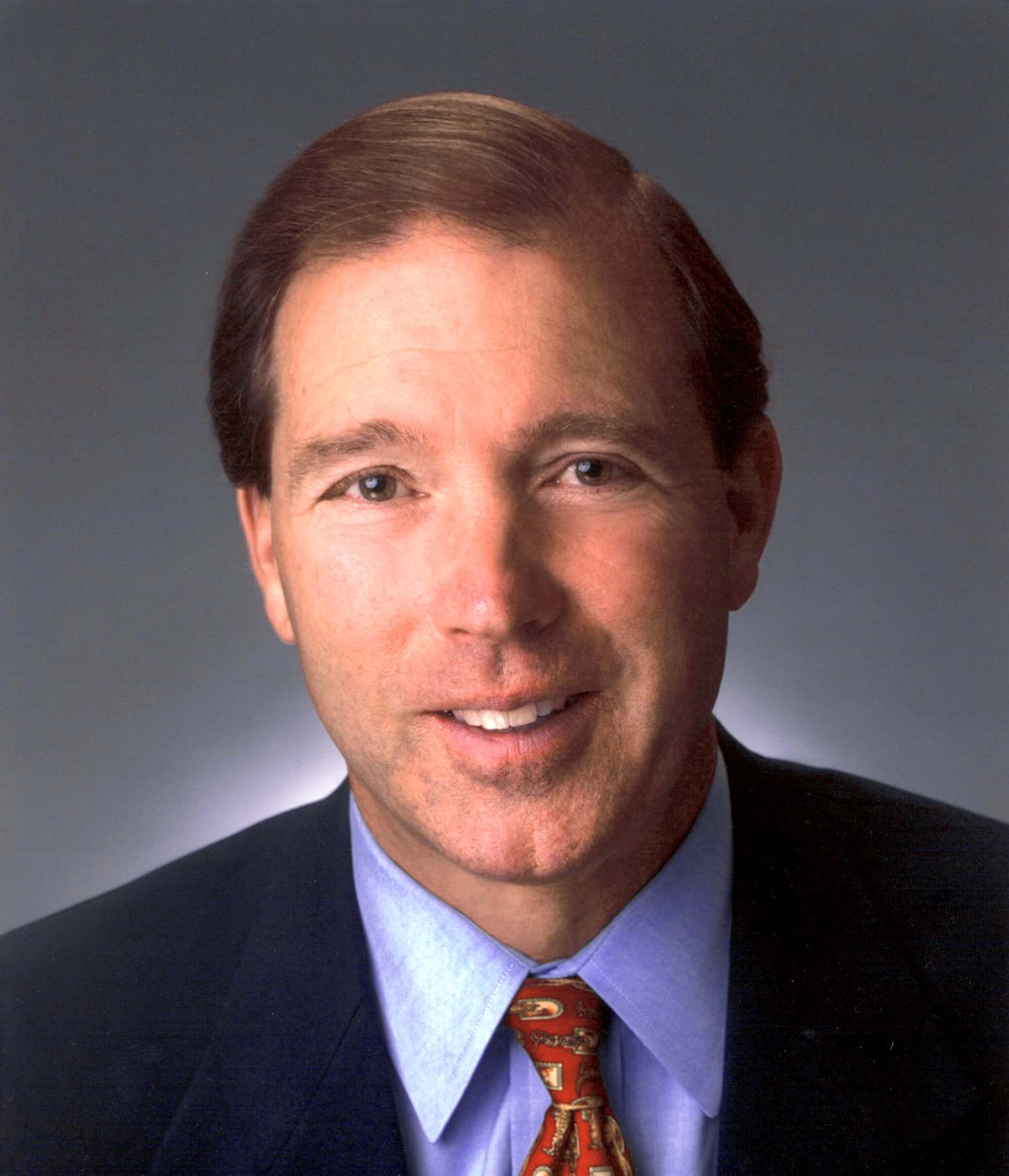

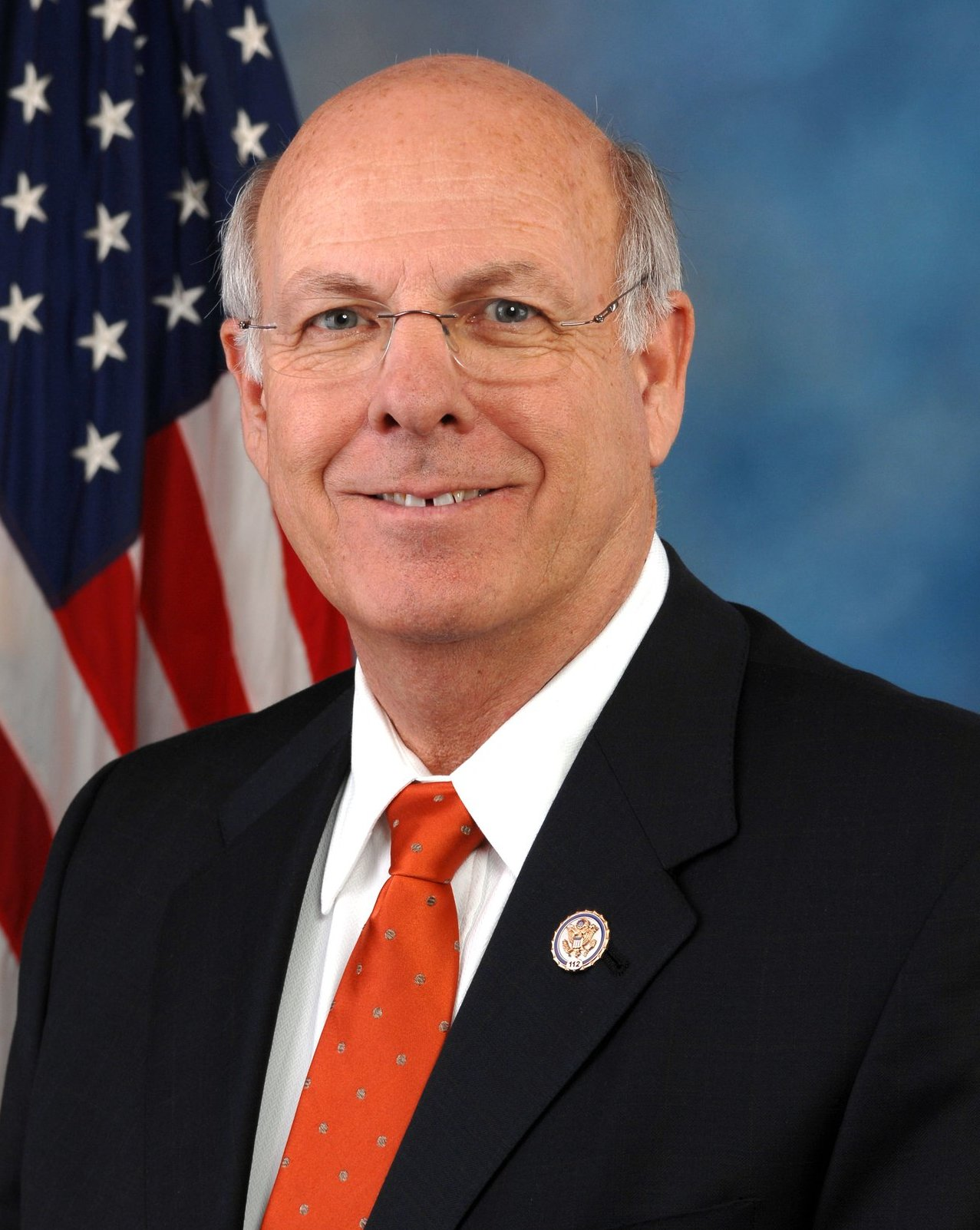
Nominee	Tom Udall	Steve Pearce
Party	Democratic	Republican
Popular vote	505,128	318,522
Percentage	61.33%	38.67%
- Udall: 50–60% 60–70% 70–80% 80–90% >90% Pearce: 50–60% 60–70% 70–80% 80–90% >90% Tie: 50% No data
U.S. senator before election
Pete Domenici
Republican
Elected U.S. Senator
Tom Udall
Democratic

The 2008 United States Senate election in New Mexico was held on November 4, 2008, coinciding with the 2008 U.S. presidential election. Incumbent Republican U.S. Senator Pete Domenici decided to retire instead of seeking a seventh term. All three of New Mexico's U.S. Representatives (Tom Udall, Steve Pearce, and Heather Wilson) retired from the House to run in this election, which was the first open Senate seat in the state since 1972 where Domenici was first elected on this seat. Pearce narrowly defeated Wilson in the Republican primary, but Udall won the general election after an uncontested Democratic primary.

In February 2007 Domenici indicated his intention to run for re-election. By October 2007, he changed his mind, stating that because of the progression of a medical condition, he would not seek a seventh term. Domenici also lost his chairmanship after Republicans lost control of the Senate in the 2006 Senate election, which may have inclined him against running. On June 3, 2008, Pearce and Udall won their respective nomination contests.

Democrats won this seat for the first time since 1966, the NM-01 House seat for the first time ever, and the NM-02 seat for the first time since 1978, and thereby gave New Mexico an all-Democratic Congressional delegation for the first time since 1969. Tom Udall outperformed Barack Obama's totals in the concurrent presidential election by 4.42% and by 32,706 votes.

== Democratic primary ==
=== Candidates ===
- Tom Udall, U.S. Representative

=== Campaign ===
After Domenici announced he was not running, Democratic Governor Bill Richardson was considered a leading candidate for the seat, but in October he affirmed his commitment to his presidential nomination campaign.

In October Albuquerque Mayor Martin Chavez entered the race for the Democratic nomination. In early November five-term Democratic Rep. Tom Udall entered the race. On December 7 Chavez withdrew from the race, saying "While I deeply appreciate all the support I have received, it has become very clear to me that Democrats should not be divided in the upcoming election."

=== Results ===
Democratic primary results
Party	Candidate	Votes	%
Democratic	Tom Udall	141,629	100.00%
Total votes		141,629	100.00%

== Republican primary ==
=== Candidates ===
- Steve Pearce, U.S. Representative, and candidate in 2000
- Heather Wilson, U.S. Representative

=== Polling ===
Source	Date	Steve Pearce	Heather Wilson
SurveyUSA	November 16–18, 2007	37%	56%
SurveyUSA	May 15, 2008	49%	46%

=== Results ===
Results by county: Map legend: Pearce—>90%; Pearce—80–90%; Pearce—70–80%; Pearce—60–70%; Pearce—50–60%; Wilson—50–60%; Wilson—60–70%; Wilson—70–80%

Republican primary results
Party	Candidate	Votes	%
Republican	Steve Pearce	57,953	51.29%
Republican	Heather Wilson	55,039	48.71%
Total votes		112,992	100.00%

== General election ==
=== Candidates ===
- Tom Udall (D), U.S. Representative
- Steve Pearce (R), U.S. Representative

=== Predictions ===
Source	Ranking	As of
The Cook Political Report	Lean D (flip)	October 23, 2008
CQ Politics	Likely D (flip)	October 31, 2008
Rothenberg Political Report	Likely D (flip)	November 2, 2008
Real Clear Politics	Likely D (flip)	October 31, 2008

=== David Iglesias dismissal controversy ===
Domenici and Wilson were both being investigated by the Senate for their roles in the dismissal of prosecutor David Iglesias. This may have affected Wilson's chances in the 2008 election.

In late October Pearce made 130,000 automated phone calls, which led Wilson to "cry foul." At issue was Pearce's use of the phone calls to justify his opposition to the State Children's Health Insurance Program (SCHIP) bill. The Wilson campaign claimed that "Pearce violated House ethics by urging those he called to contact him through his official, non-campaign phone number or check out his official, non-campaign Web site."

=== Finances ===
The National Republican Senatorial Committee (NRSC) attempted to defend 23 Senate seats up for election in November. Committee chair Senator John Ensign identified the 10 most competitive Republican seats in June 2008. He was asked about the two Republican seats most likely to turn Democratic, Virginia and New Mexico. Ensign did not directly say whether the NRSC was considering walking away to work on other seats that can be won, but he said, "You don’t waste money on races that don’t need it or you can’t win."

Udall raised more than $801,000 prior to November 29. Wilson had slightly less, including a November Washington fundraiser with Vice President Dick Cheney that netted $110,000, bringing her total to about $750,000.

=== Debates ===
The candidates agreed to three televised debates: October 15 on KOB-TV, October 18 on KRQE and October 26 on KOAT-TV. The AARP co-sponsored the second debate and the Albuquerque Journal co-sponsored the final debate. They also appeared together on Meet the Press in the fall.

=== Polling ===
Source	Date	Steve Pearce (R)	Tom Udall (D)
SurveyUSA	October 5–7, 2007	37%	55%
Fairbank, Maslin, Maullin & Associates	October 23–27, 2007	33%	50%
SurveyUSA	October 27–30, 2007	40%	56%
Research 2000	November 5–7, 2007	37%	54%
SurveyUSA	November 16–18, 2007	40%	54%
New Mexico State University	February 11, 2008	31%	53%
Rasmussen Reports	February 29, 2008	42%	50%
Rasmussen Reports	April 10, 2008	40%	54%
Rasmussen Reports	May 14, 2008	37%	53%
SurveyUSA	May 15, 2008	36%	60%
Rasmussen Reports	July 24, 2008	35%	61%
Rasmussen Reports	August 20, 2008	44%	52%
Rasmussen Reports	September 8, 2008	44%	51%
Survey USA	September 16, 2008	41%	56%
Public Policy Polling	September 19, 2008	37%	57%
Survey USA	September 29–30, 2008	39%	58%
Rasmussen Reports	October 1, 2008	41%	55%
Survey USA	October 13, 2008	40%	58%
Rasmussen Reports	October 13, 2008	37%	57%
Rasmussen Reports	October 28, 2008	41%	56%
Survey USA	October 31, 2008	42%	56%

=== Results ===
2008 United States Senate election in New Mexico
Party	Candidate	Votes	%	±%
Democratic	Tom Udall	505,128	61.33%	+26.37%
Republican	Steve Pearce	318,522	38.67%	−26.37%
Total votes		823,650	100.00%	N/A
Democratic gain from Republican				

==== Counties that flipped from Republican to Democratic ====
- Bernalillo (largest city: Albuquerque)
- Doña Ana (largest city: Las Cruces)
- Guadalupe (largest city: Santa Rosa)
- Harding (largest city: Roy)
- Hidalgo (largest city: Lordsburg)
- Luna (largest city: Deming)
- Quay (largest city: Tucumcari)
- Sandoval (largest city: Rancho)
- Torrance (largest city: Moriarty)
- Valencia (largest village: Los Lunas)
- Colfax (largest city: Raton)
- Los Alamos (largest city: Los Alamos)
- Grant (largest city: Silver City)
- McKinley (largest city: Gallup)
- Arriba (largest city: Española)
- Cibola (largest city: Grants)
- Mora (largest city: Mora)

== See also ==
- 2008 United States Senate elections
