= Steve Pearce (politician) =

American businessman and politician (born 1947)

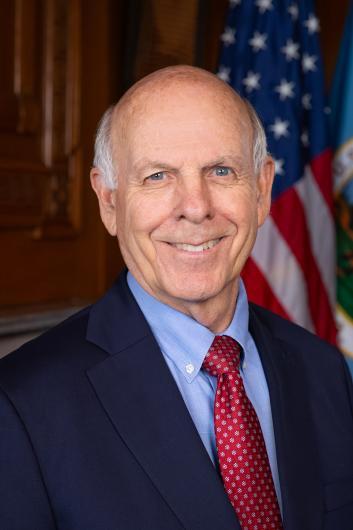
- Official portrait, 2026

Director of the Bureau of Land Management
- Incumbent
- Assumed office May 20, 2026
- President: Donald Trump
- Preceded by: Tracy Stone-Manning

Chair of the New Mexico Republican Party
- In office December 8, 2018 – December 7, 2024
- Preceded by: Ryan Cangiolosi
- Succeeded by: Amy Barela

Member of the U.S. House of Representatives from New Mexico's 2nd district
- In office January 3, 2011 – January 3, 2019
- Preceded by: Harry Teague
- Succeeded by: Xochitl Torres Small
- In office January 3, 2003 – January 3, 2009
- Preceded by: Joe Skeen
- Succeeded by: Harry Teague

Member of the New Mexico House of Representatives from the 62nd district
- In office January 20, 1997 – January 13, 2001
- Succeeded by: Donald Bratton

Personal details
- Born: Stevan Edward Pearce; August 24, 1947 (age 79) Lamesa, Texas, U.S.
- Party: Republican
- Spouse: Cynthia Pearce (m. 1982)
- Children: 1
- Education: New Mexico State University (BBA); Eastern New Mexico University (MBA)
- Website: House website

Military service
- Branch/service: United States Air Force
- Years of service: 1970–1976
- Rank: Captain
- Unit: 463rd Tactical Airlift Wing
- Battles/wars: Vietnam War
- Awards: Distinguished Flying Cross; Air Medal

Stevan Edward Pearce (born August 24, 1947) is an American businessman and politician currently serving as the 20th Director of the Bureau of Land Management. He previously served as the U.S. representative for New Mexico's 2nd congressional district from 2003 to 2009 and from 2011 to 2019. He is a member of the Republican Party and was his party's unsuccessful nominee in the 2008 U.S Senate election and the 2018 gubernatorial election.

On December 8, 2018, Pearce was elected Chair of the New Mexico Republican Party, replacing Ryan Cangiolosi. He was re-elected in 2020 and again in 2022. He opted against running for a fourth term as the Chair of the New Mexico Republican Party in 2024. In 2025, President Donald Trump nominated Pearce to be the director of the Bureau of Land Management. His nomination was criticized by many environmentalists because Pearce founded an oilfield services company and has supported oil and gas drilling. He was confirmed by the Senate on May 18, 2026, and sworn in on May 20, 2026.

== Early life, education, and business career ==
Pearce was born in Lamesa, Texas, and raised in Hobbs, New Mexico. He attended college at New Mexico State University in Las Cruces, having earned a Bachelor of Business Administration in economics. Afterward, he received a Master of Business Administration from Eastern New Mexico University in Portales. While at New Mexico State University, Pearce was elected president of the student body.

He served in the Vietnam War as a C-130 pilot in the United States Air Force. Pearce flew over 518 hours of combat flight and 77 hours of combat support. He was awarded the Distinguished Flying Cross and two Air Medals, as well as seven other military medals and four exceptional service awards. Upon returning to the United States, Pearce was assigned to the Strategic Air Command at Blytheville Air Force Base, Arkansas. He was honorably discharged from the U.S. Air Force with the rank of captain.

Pearce and his wife owned and operated Lea Fishing Tools, an oilfield services company in Hobbs, New Mexico, until they sold the business in 2003 to Key Energy Services for $12 million.

== New Mexico House of Representatives ==
=== Elections ===
Pearce was elected to the New Mexico House of Representatives in 1996 and re-elected in 1998, both times unopposed.

=== Committee assignments ===
He was elected as Republican Caucus Chairman and served on the Appropriations Committee.

== 2000 U.S. Senate Campaign ==
Pearce ran for the United States Senate in the seat held by longtime incumbent Democrat Jeff Bingaman. He lost in the Republican primary to former third district U.S. Congressman Bill Redmond 60% to 22%.

== U.S. House of Representatives ==
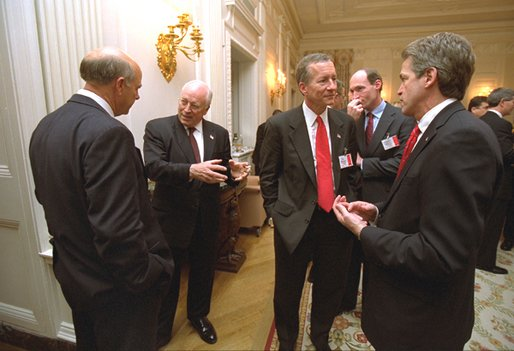
Pearce talks with Vice President Dick Cheney in 2002.

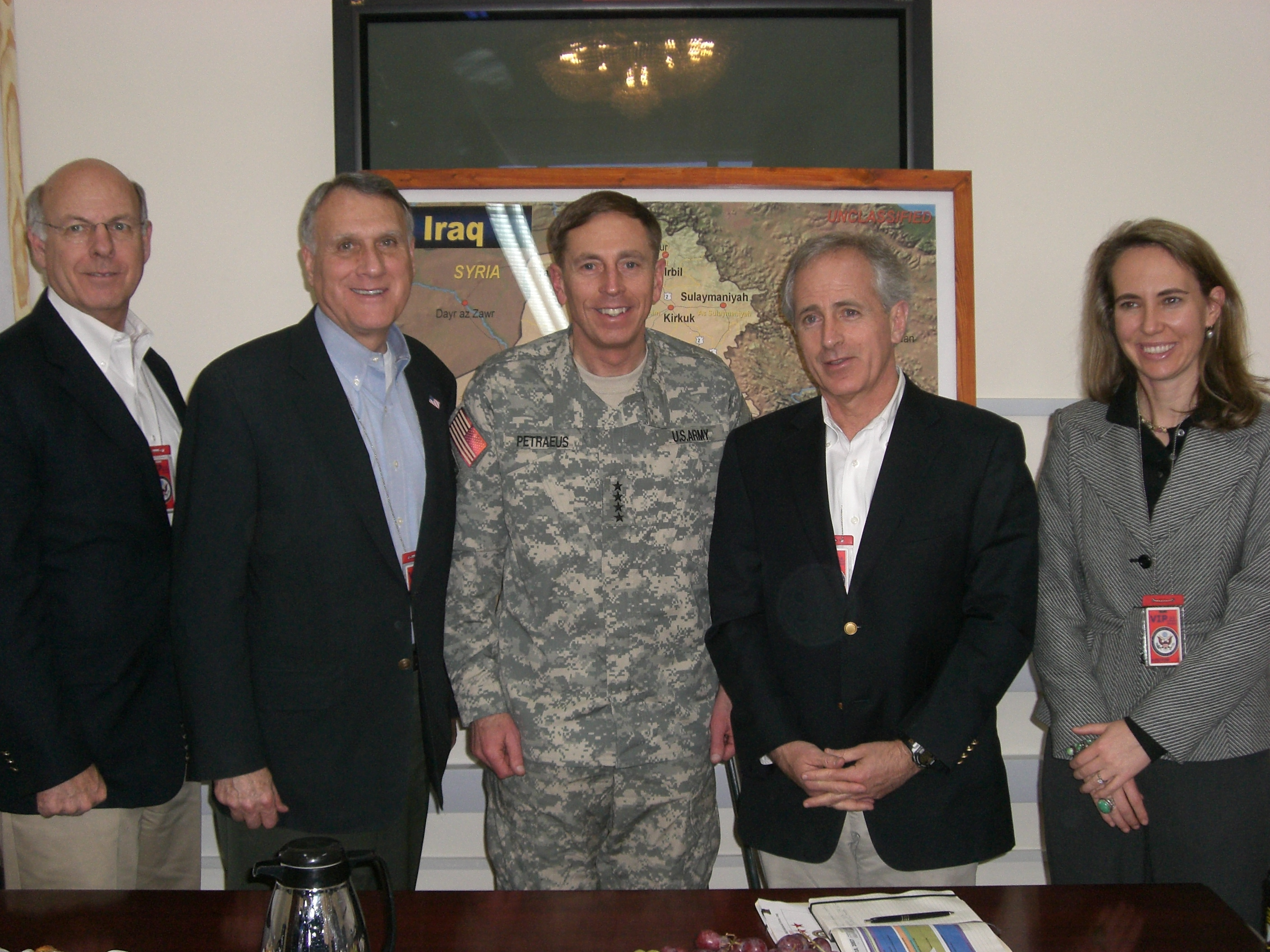
Pearce, Jon Kyl, Bob Corker, and Gabby Giffords with David Petraeus in 2007

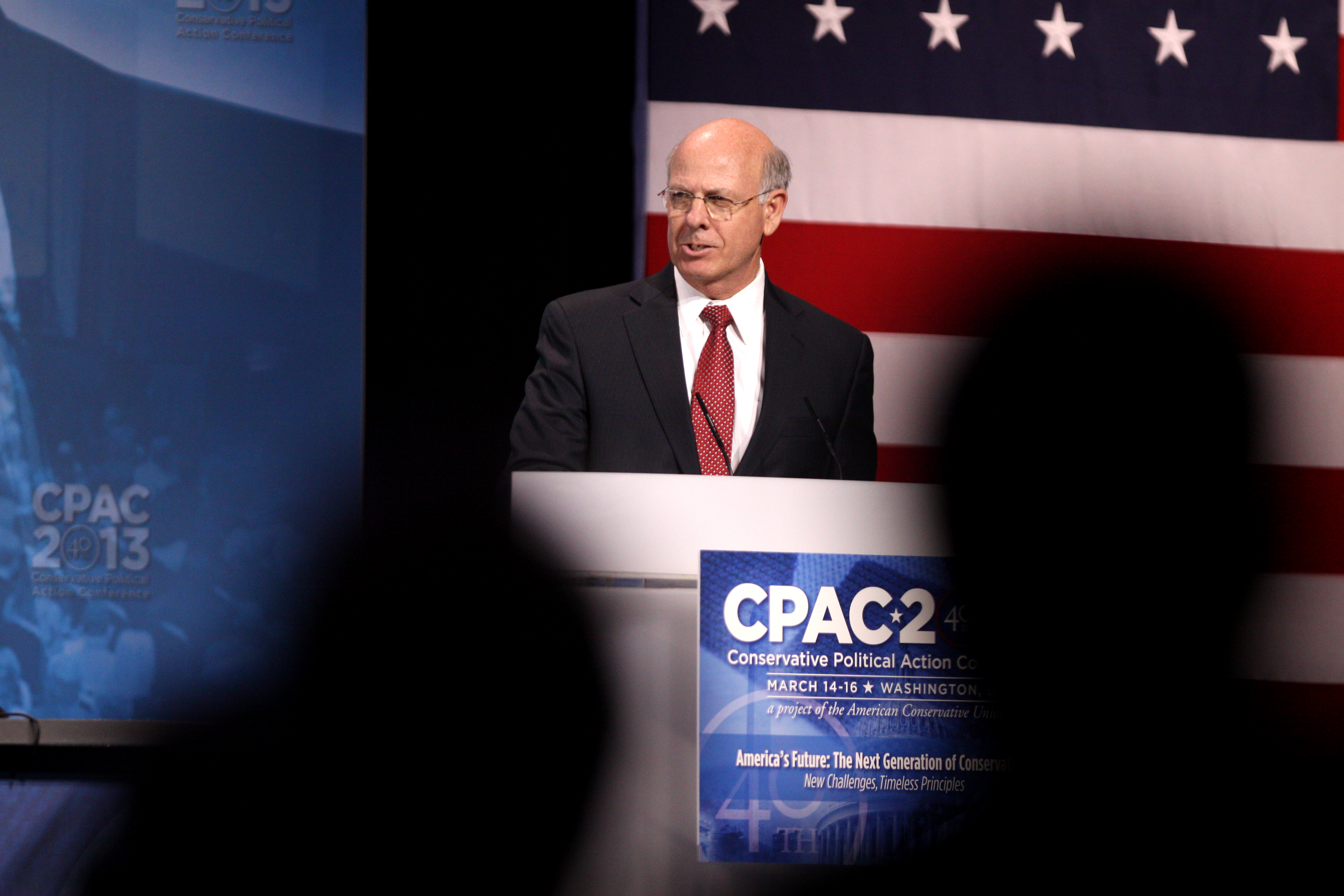
Pearce speaking at CPAC in 2013

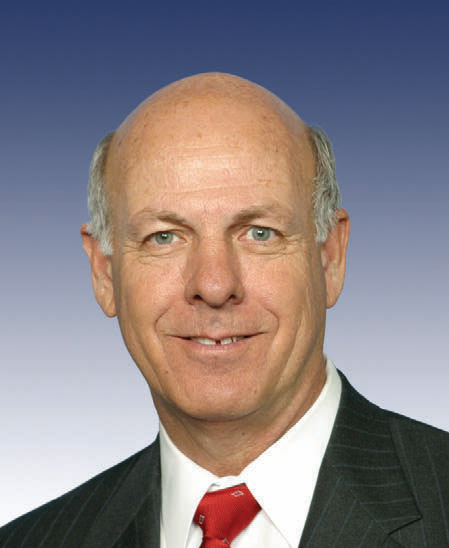
Congressional portrait, 109th Congress

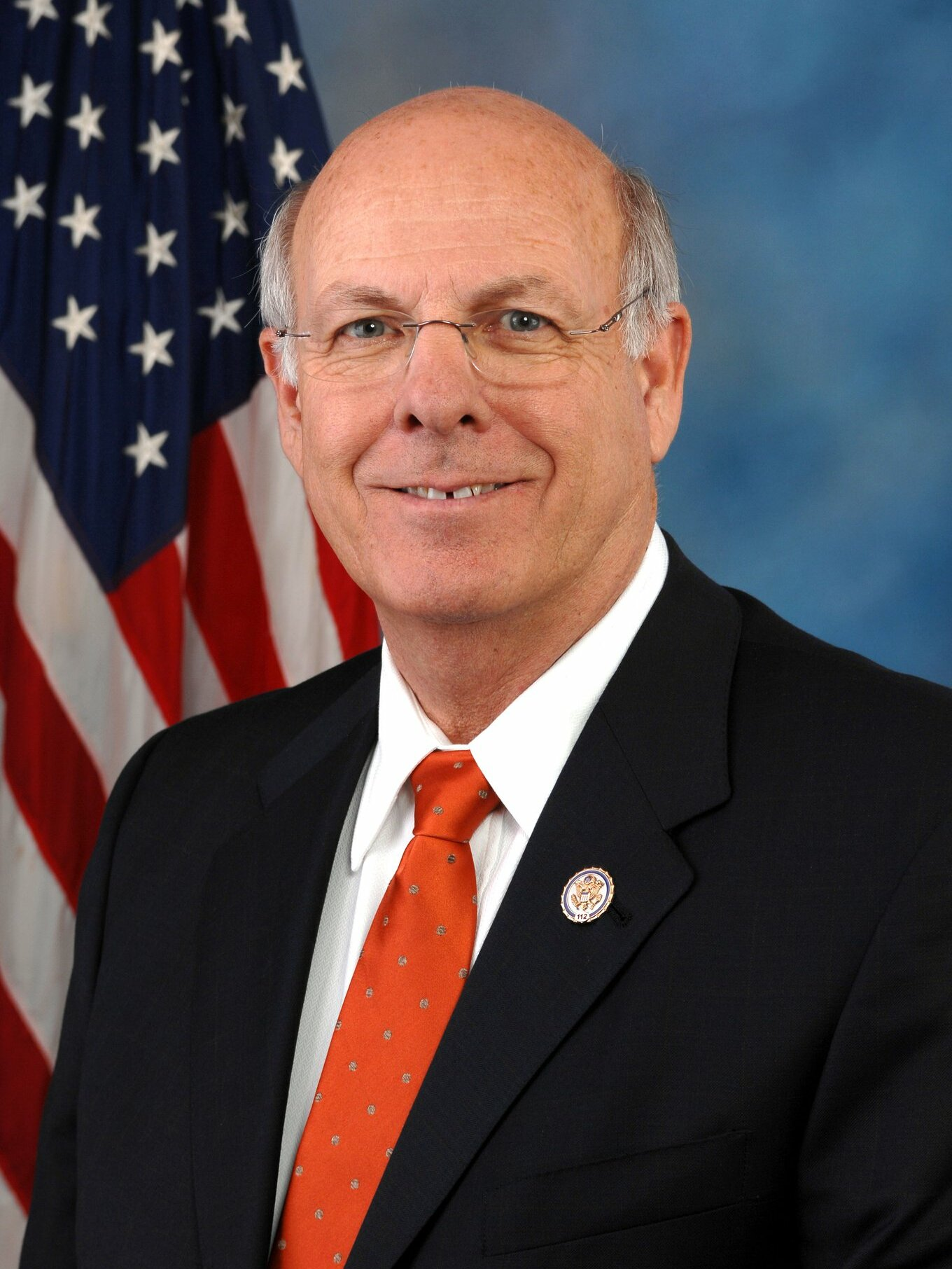
Congressional portrait, 112th Congress

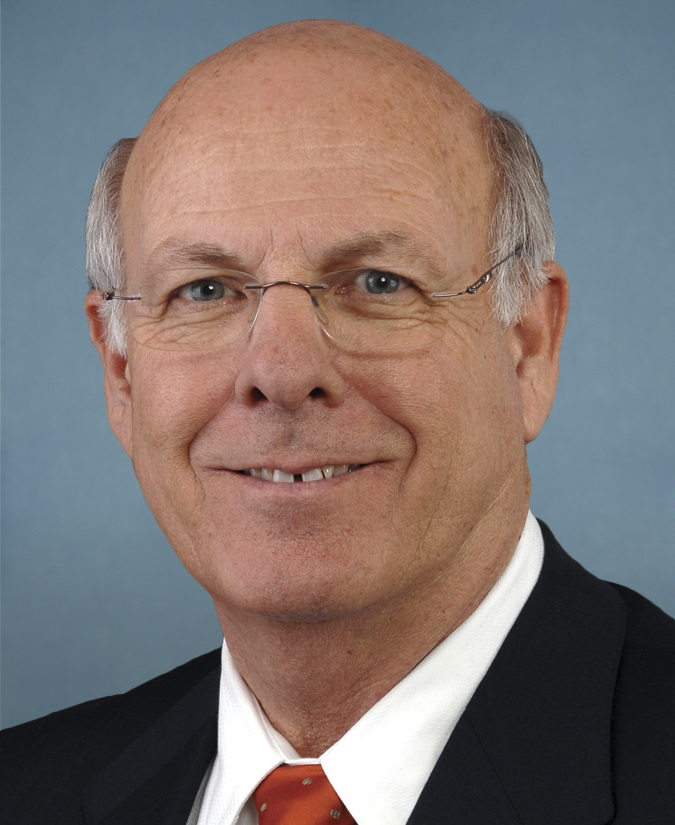
Congressional portrait, 113th Congress

=== Elections ===
==== 2002 ====
Eleven term incumbent Republican U.S. Representative Joe Skeen decided to retire. In the Republican primary, Pearce ran and won the five candidate field with a plurality of 35%. His closest challenger was rancher and businessman Edward R. Tinsley, owner of the K-Bob's Steakhouse, who got 27%. Coincidentally, both Pearce and Tinsley were reared in the small West Texas city of Lamesa in Dawson County. In the general election, Pearce defeated Democratic state senator John Arthur Smith 56% to 44%.

==== 2004 ====
Pearce won re-election to a second term against Democratic state representative Gary King 60% to 40%.

==== 2006 ====
Pearce won re-election to a third term against Democratic pastor Al Kissling 59% to 40%.

==== 2008 ====
Pearce ran for the open Senate seat of retiring six term Republican US Senator Pete Domenici. He did not run for reelection to the 2nd District, making New Mexico's 2nd District an open seat race. Democratic business owner Harry Teague defeated Republican restaurateur Edward R. Tinsley 56% to 44%.

==== 2010 ====
On August 1, 2009, Pearce announced his intention to take back his former congressional seat. On June 1, 2010, he won the Republican primary without any serious challengers. He was endorsed in the race by former vice presidential nominee Sarah Palin. He drew criticism from local media after an event in Los Lunas where he refused to say whether he believes Barack Obama is a natural-born U.S. citizen.

Pearce defeated incumbent Democrat Harry Teague 55% to 45%.

==== 2012 ====
Pearce won reelection for a 5th term to Congress and 2nd consecutive term in 2012. He defeated Democratic former educator Evelyn Madrid Erhard 59% to 41%. During the campaign, Pearce's largest donors were Mack Energy Corporation and Yates Petroleum. Pearce received $209,600 from the oil and gas sector during the campaign cycle.

==== 2014 ====
Pearce won re-election against Democrat Roxanne "Rocky" Lara with 64% of the vote.

==== 2016 ====
Pearce won re-election against Democrat Merrie Lee Soules with 62% of the vote.

Pearce did not seek re-election to the House of Representatives in 2018, instead running unsuccessfully for Governor of New Mexico.

=== Tenure ===
Plagiarism

In 2005, Pearce was accused of having plagiarized articles from think tanks like The Heritage Foundation. The articles were published under Pearce's name in small papers throughout New Mexico. His press secretary, Jim Burns, admitted to having plagiarized the articles himself without Pearce's knowledge, and quickly resigned.

=== Committee assignments ===
- Committee on Financial Services
  - Subcommittee on Capital Markets and Government-Sponsored Enterprises
  - Subcommittee on Financial Institutions and Consumer Credit
  - Subcommittee on Oversight and Investigations

=== Caucus memberships ===
- Co-chair of the Border Security Caucus
- Vice-chairman of the Native American Caucus
- Vice-chairman of the Sportsman Caucus
- Freedom Caucus
- Republican Study Committee
- Congressional Hispanic Conference {associate member}
- Congressional Constitution Caucus
- Congressional Western Caucus

== 2008 U.S. Senate campaign ==
On October 16, 2007, Pearce announced he would run for the Republican nomination to replace Pete Domenici in the U.S. Senate.

Fellow Republican representative Heather Wilson had previously declared her candidacy in that race. In late October 2007, Pearce made 130,000 automated phone calls to justify his opposition to the State Children's Health Insurance Program (SCHIP) bill that would have provided health benefit to children, which the Wilson campaign claimed "Pearce violated House ethics by urging those he called to contact him through his official, non-campaign phone number or check out his official, non-campaign Web site."

In March 2008, Pearce garnered 55% of the vote at the Republican pre-primary nominating convention. He narrowly won the June 3, 2008 Republican primary.

Pearce faced fellow U.S. Representative Tom Udall, a Democrat who represented New Mexico's 3rd congressional district, and lost in the general election, 61% to 39%.

== 2018 gubernatorial campaign ==
Pearce listening to Tribal College Leaders in 2018

In July 2017, Pearce announced his run for Governor of New Mexico. to replace the term-limited Republican governor Susana Martinez. He ran unopposed in the Republican primary. Pearce lost to Democratic nominee Michelle Lujan Grisham, a fellow New Mexico U.S. Representative from the 1st district in the general election on November 6, 2018.

== Post-congressional career ==
=== Chair of the New Mexico Republican Party ===
On December 8, 2018, Pearce was elected Chair of the New Mexico Republican Party, replacing Ryan Cangiolosi. He was re-elected in 2020 and again in 2022. He opted against running for a fourth term as the Chair of the New Mexico Republican Party in 2024.

=== Director of the Bureau of Land Management ===
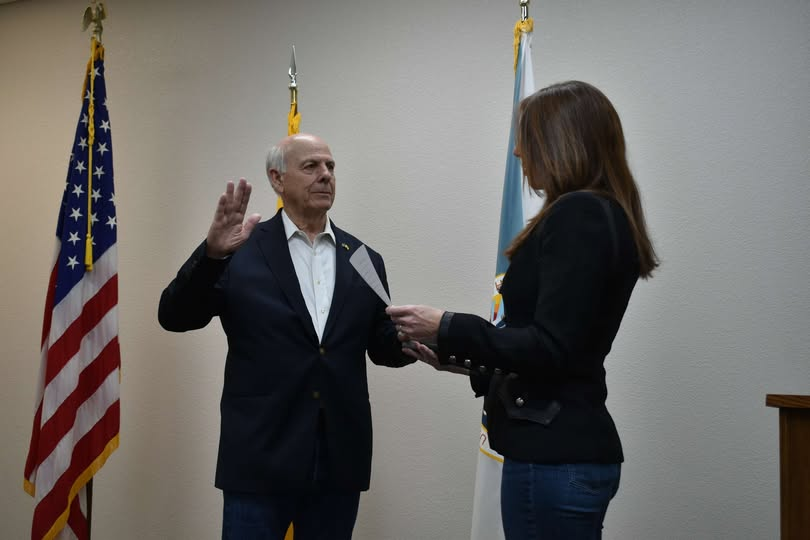
Pearce being sworn in as Director of the Bureau of Land Management

In 2025, President Donald Trump nominated Pearce to be the Director of the Bureau of Land Management. His nomination was criticized by many environmentalists because Pearce founded an oilfield services company and has supported oil and gas drilling. In response to Pearce’s nomination, the Southwest Public Policy Institute (SPPI), a New Mexico–based free-market think tank, issued unusually strong criticism. In an op-ed for The Washington Post and subsequent interview for Politico, SPPI president Patrick M. Brenner argued that Pearce’s record as party chair and his public promotion of false claims of widespread voter fraud rendered him unfit for the position, stating that his approach made the state Republican Party “more doctrinaire” and undermined evidence-based policymaking. Pearce was confirmed by the Senate on May 18, 2026, and was sworn in on May 20, 2026.

== Political positions ==
=== Barack Obama citizenship conspiracy theories ===
In 2010, Pearce expressed skepticism that President Barack Obama was born in the United States.

=== Environment ===
Pearce has questioned the scientific consensus on climate change. He said that "in fact the last 17 years there has not been global warming" and that "there are 31,000 scientists who say that human action is not causing the global warming at all".

Pearce had been a long-time advocate of oil and gas drilling in Otero Mesa.

=== 2020 election ===
After Joe Biden defeated Donald Trump in the 2020 presidential election, Pearce and the New Mexico GOP cast doubt on the validity of the election results. Soon after the election was called for Biden, Pearce called for donations so Trump could challenge the results. In late 2020, Pearce supported the Trump campaign's efforts to invalidate Biden's victory in New Mexico, falsely claiming that massive voter fraud occurred. In his podcast, Pearce aired numerous conspiracy theories about the election, claiming he wanted to investigate possible "anomalies". In December 2020, Pearce issued a statement supporting the Texas v. Pennsylvania lawsuit aiming to overturn the certification of Biden's victory in multiple states, citing false claims of fraud.

On January 7, 2021, Pearce drew criticism when he claimed that alleged irregularities in the election "tarnished" democracy, soon after Biden's electoral victory was certified by Congress. On January 9, Pearce tweeted that Trump "will be our President FOREVER and no one can take that away from us." The tweet was soon deleted but Pearce defended his post, saying that Trump's false claims of fraud were legitimate and insisted that there was massive voting irregularities in the election.

== Personal life ==
Pearce has been married to his wife Cynthia for over 20 years. In 2013, Pearce published a memoir called Just Fly the Plane, Stupid!. It received attention because Pearce controversially wrote in the memoir that a wife should "voluntarily submit" to her husband, just as the husband should "lovingly lead and sacrifice".

Pearce attends Taylor Memorial Baptist Church, a Southern Baptist church in Hobbs.

U.S. House of Representatives
Preceded by Joe Skeen	Member of the U.S. House of Representatives from New Mexico's 2nd congressional district 2003–2009	Succeeded by Harry Teague
Preceded by Harry Teague	Member of the U.S. House of Representatives from New Mexico's 2nd congressional district 2011–2019	Succeeded by Xochitl Torres Small
Party political offices
Preceded by Pete Domenici	Republican nominee for U.S. Senator from New Mexico (Class 2); 2008	Succeeded by Allen Weh
Preceded by Susana Martinez	Republican nominee for Governor of New Mexico; 2018	Succeeded by Mark Ronchetti
Preceded by Ryan Cangiolosi	Chair of the New Mexico Republican Party; 2018–2024	Succeeded by Amy Barela
U.S. order of precedence (ceremonial)
Preceded by Ernest Istook as Former U.S. Representative	Order of precedence of the United States as Former U.S. Representative	Succeeded by Trent Franks as Former U.S. Representative
