= K-Bob's Steakhouse =

Regional restaurant chain in New Mexico, United States

K-BOB'S
- Type: Franchise
- Industry: Restaurants
- Founded: Clovis, New Mexico (1966; 60 years ago)
- Founder: Gabreil E. Parson and Jo Ann Parson Bowen
- Headquarters: Houston, Texas, USA
- Number of locations: 10
- Area served: New Mexico; Texas
- Products: Steaks, Chicken, Catfish, Vegetables, Salad, Desserts
- Owner: Edward Roy Tinsley IV; Morgan Booth
- Parent: K-BOB'S Steakhouse Holding Company LLC
- Website: www.k-bobs.com

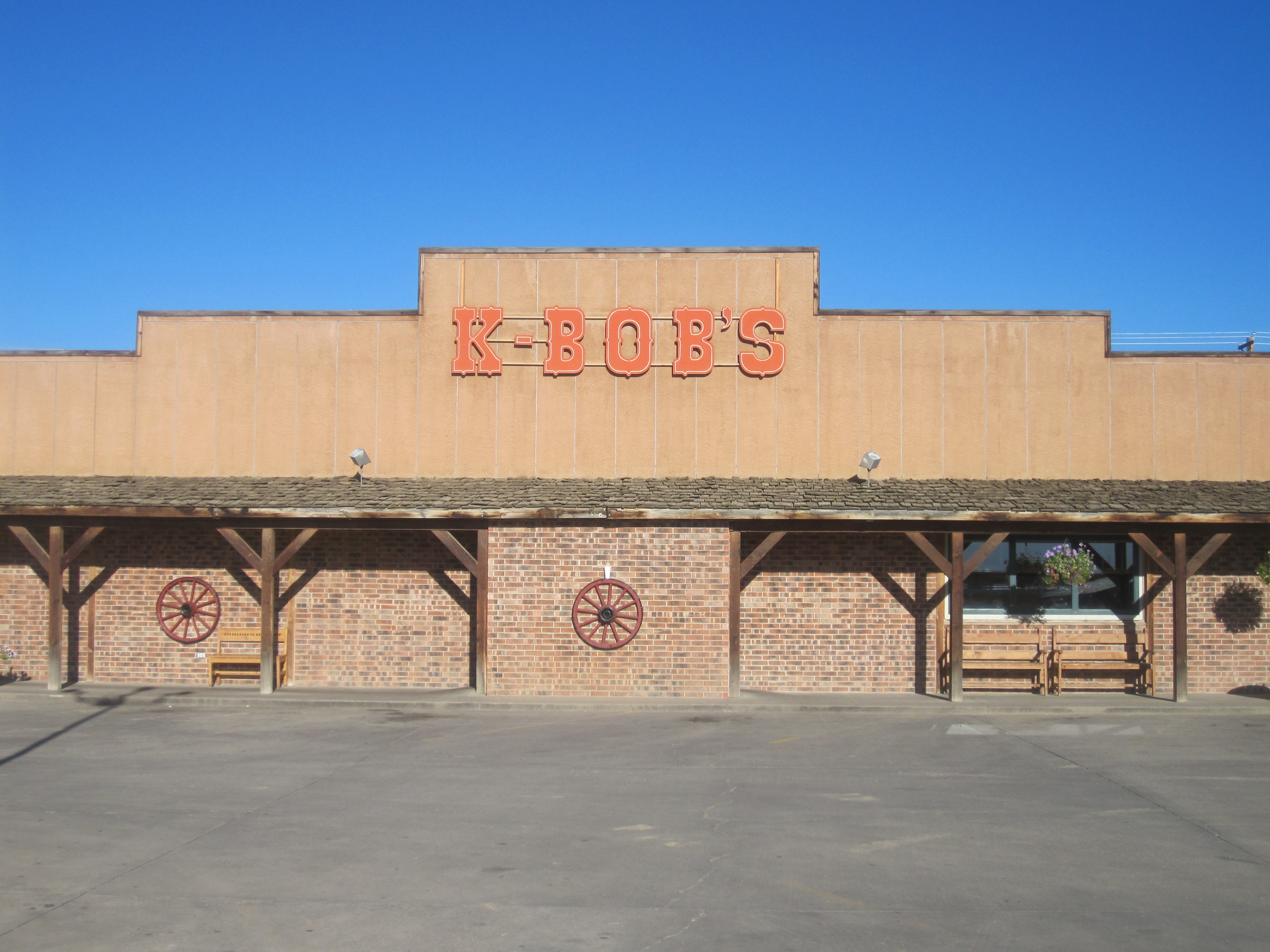
The K-Bob's outlet in Raton, New Mexico

K-BOB'S is a regional restaurant chain that operates in Texas, New Mexico, and formerly Colorado. The company was founded in 1966 in Clovis, New Mexico, by Gabe E. Parson. It filed for Chapter 11 bankruptcy in 1989 and emerged from in 1991 under the new ownership and management of Edward Tinsley III. Tinsley relocated the company headquarters from Dallas to Albuquerque, and then later to Santa Fe. In August 2015, Tinsley sold the company to a private equity fund founded by his son (Edward R. Tinsley IV) and son-in-law (Morgan Booth). Tinsley retained 4 stores in the New Mexico market as a franchisee. Today, Tinsley IV and Booth operate the company out of its current corporate headquarters in Houston.

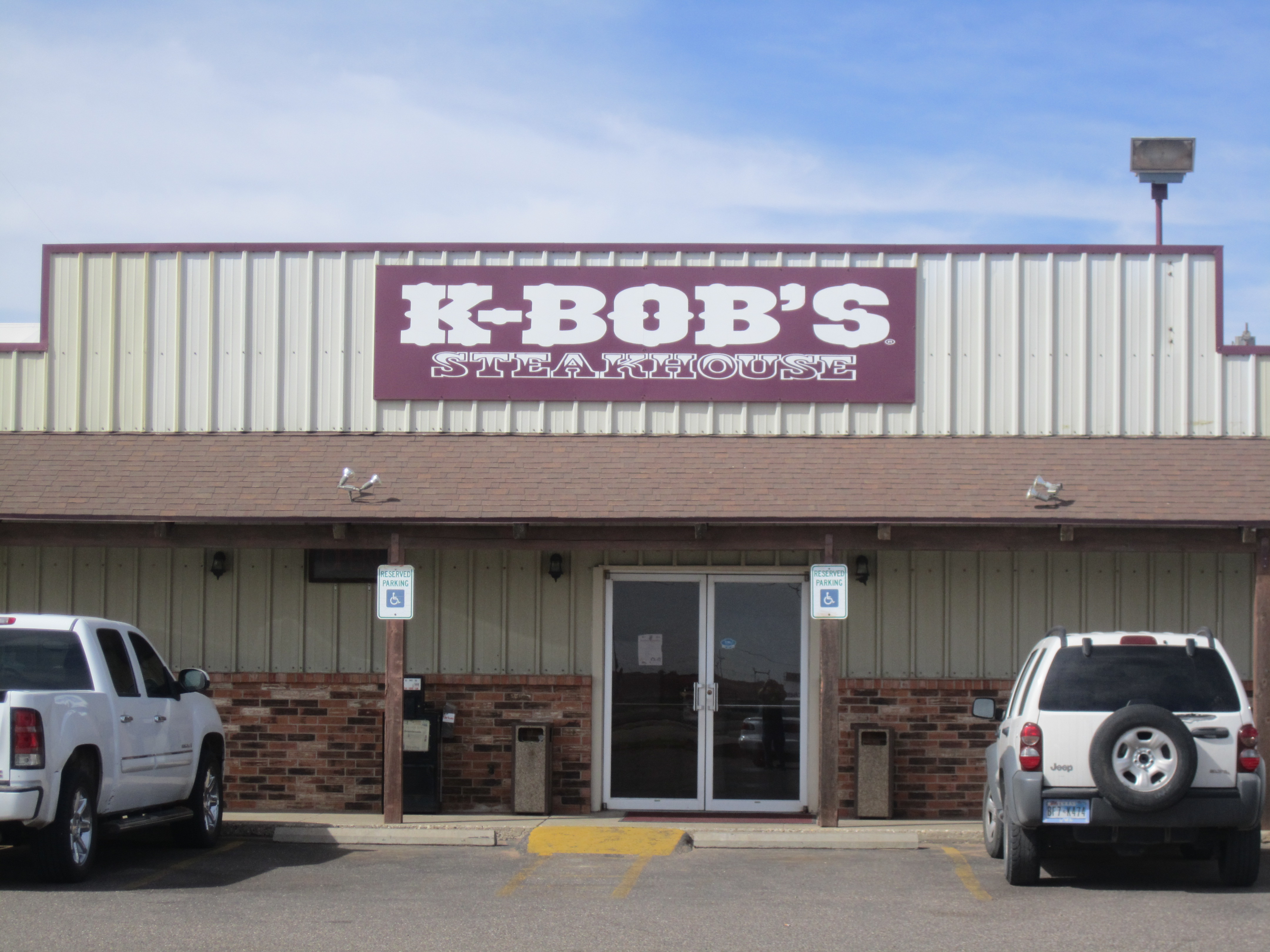
K-Bob's Steakhouse in Tinsley's hometown, Lamesa, Texas
