= 2014 New Mexico elections =

- November 4, 2014

A general election was held in the U.S. state of New Mexico on November 4, 2014. All of New Mexico's executive officers were up for election as well as a United States Senate seat, and all of New Mexico's three seats in the United States House of Representatives. Primary elections were held on June 3, 2014.

== Governor ==
Incumbent Republican Governor Susana Martinez ran for re-election to a second term in office.

Four Democrats ran for their party's nomination: Attorney General of New Mexico Gary King, State Senator Linda M. Lopez, State Senator Howie Morales, former State Executive Director of the Farm Service Agency Lawrence Rael and businessman Alan Webber.

King won the primary with 35% of the vote.

New Mexico gubernatorial election, 2014
Party	Candidate	Votes	%
Republican	Susana Martinez/John Sanchez (incumbent)	293,443	57.2
Democratic	Gary King/Debra Haaland	219,362	42.8
Total votes		512,805	100.0
Republican hold			

== Lieutenant governor ==
Unlike most states, in New Mexico, the candidates for governor and lieutenant governor were elected in separate primaries. The winning candidates then run together on the same ticket.

Incumbent Republican lieutenant governor John Sanchez was running for re-election to a second term.

Deb Haaland was running for the Democrats. Marie Julienne had been running, but was disqualified. Chocolatier Chuck Higgins had also been in the running, but he withdrew.

=== Democratic primary ===
Democratic primary results
Party	Candidate	Votes	%
Democratic	Debra A. Haaland	95,134	100.0
Total votes		95,134	100.0

=== Republican primary ===
Republican primary results
Party	Candidate	Votes	%
Republican	John Sanchez (incumbent)	58,672	100.0
Total votes		58,672	100.0

== Attorney General ==
2014 New Mexico Attorney General election
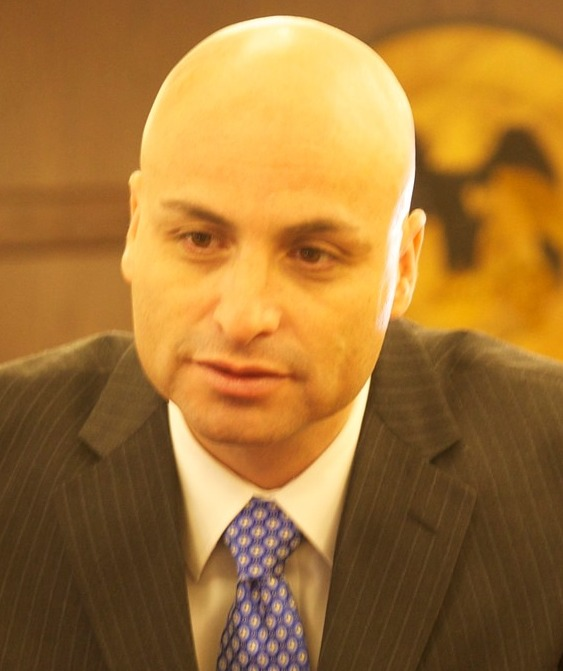

Nominee	Hector Balderas	Susan Riedel
Party	Democratic	Republican
Popular vote	295,008	Susan Riedel
Percentage	58.3%	41.7%
- Balderas: 50–60% 60–70% 70–80% 80–90% Riedel: 50–60% 60–70% 70–80%
Attorney General before election
Gary King
Democratic
Elected Attorney General
Hector Balderas
Democratic

Incumbent Democratic attorney general Gary King was term-limited and could not run for re-election to a third term in office. He instead ran for governor.

Hector Balderas, the State Auditor of New Mexico, was the only Democrat running. In January 2013, former Public Regulation Commissioner Jason Marks formed an exploratory committee, but he suspended his campaign in July, citing poor fundraising.

Former Las Cruces Chief Deputy District Attorney and former Third Judicial District Judge Susan Riedel ran unopposed for the Republican nomination. Attorney James Paul "Jim" Baiamonte had been running, but withdrew from the race. Matthew Chandler, the former District Attorney for the 9th Judicial District and Republican nominee for attorney general in 2010, had considered running again, but instead resigned as district attorney and opened a private law practice.

Poll source	Date(s) administered	Sample size	Margin of error	Hector Balderas (D)	Susan Riedel (R)	Undecided
Gravis Marketing	September 27–October 1, 2014	727	± 4%	52%	37%	11%

New Mexico Attorney General election, 2014
Party	Candidate	Votes	%
Democratic	Hector Balderas	295,008	58.3
Republican	Susan Riedel	211,303	41.7
Total votes		506,311	100.0
Democratic hold			

== Secretary of State ==
2014 New Mexico Secretary of State election

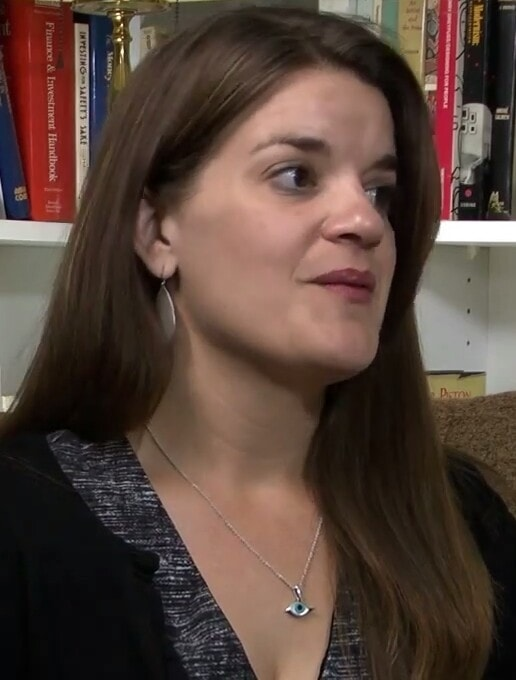
Nominee	Dianna Duran	Maggie Toulouse Oliver
Party	Republican	Democratic
Popular vote	262,117	245,508
Percentage	51.6%	48.4%
- Duran: 50–60% 60–70% 70–80% 80–90% Toulouse Oliver: 50–60% 60–70%
Secretary of State before election
Dianna Duran
Republican
Elected Secretary of State
Dianna Duran
Republican

Incumbent Republican Secretary of State Dianna Duran won a second term in office, defeating Democrat Maggie Toulouse Oliver. As of 2026, this is the last time a Republican was elected Secretary of State of New Mexico.

=== Polling ===
Poll source	Date(s) administered	Sample size	Margin of error	Dianna Duran (R)	Maggie Toulouse Oliver (D)	Undecided
Gravis Marketing	September 27–October 1, 2014	727	± 4%	38%	44%	19%

=== Results ===
New Mexico Secretary of State election, 2014
Party	Candidate	Votes	%
Republican	Dianna Duran (incumbent)	262,117	51.6
Democratic	Maggie Toulouse Oliver	245,508	48.4
Total votes		507,625	100.0
Republican hold			

== Treasurer ==
2014 New Mexico State Treasurer election
- November 4, 2014
Nominee	Tim Eichenberg	Arthur Castillo
Party	Democratic	Republican
Popular vote	261,203	236,699
Percentage	52.5%	47.5%
- Eichenberg: 50–60% 60–70% 70–80% Lopez: 50–60% 60–70% 70–80%
Treasurer before election
James Lewis
Democratic
Elected Treasurer
Tim Eichenberg
Democratic

Incumbent Democratic State Treasurer James B. Lewis was term-limited and cannot run for re-election to a third term in office.

Former state senator Tim Eichenberg and former chairman of the Democratic Party of New Mexico John Wertheim ran for the Democratic nomination. Former Bernalillo County Treasurer Patrick Padilla had been running, but he was disqualified from the ballot after he failed to collect enough petition signatures. Wertheim raised the challenge and Padilla was disqualified after a district judge found he was 93 valid signatures short of the minimum requirement of 4,373. Padilla may appeal the ruling. State Senator Tim Keller had considered running, but chose to run for State Auditor instead. Las Cruces Mayor Ken Miyagishima also considered running, but decided not to.

Democratic primary results
Party	Candidate	Votes	%
Democratic	Tim Eichenberg	59,683	52.72
Democratic	John Wertheim	53,523	47.28
Total votes		113,206	100.0

Rick Lopez was the only Republican running.

New Mexico Treasurer election, 2014
Party	Candidate	Votes	%
Democratic	Tim Eichenberg	261,203	52.5
Republican	Rick Lopez	236,699	47.5
Total votes		497,902	100.0
Democratic hold			

== Auditor ==
2014 New Mexico State Auditor election
- November 4, 2014
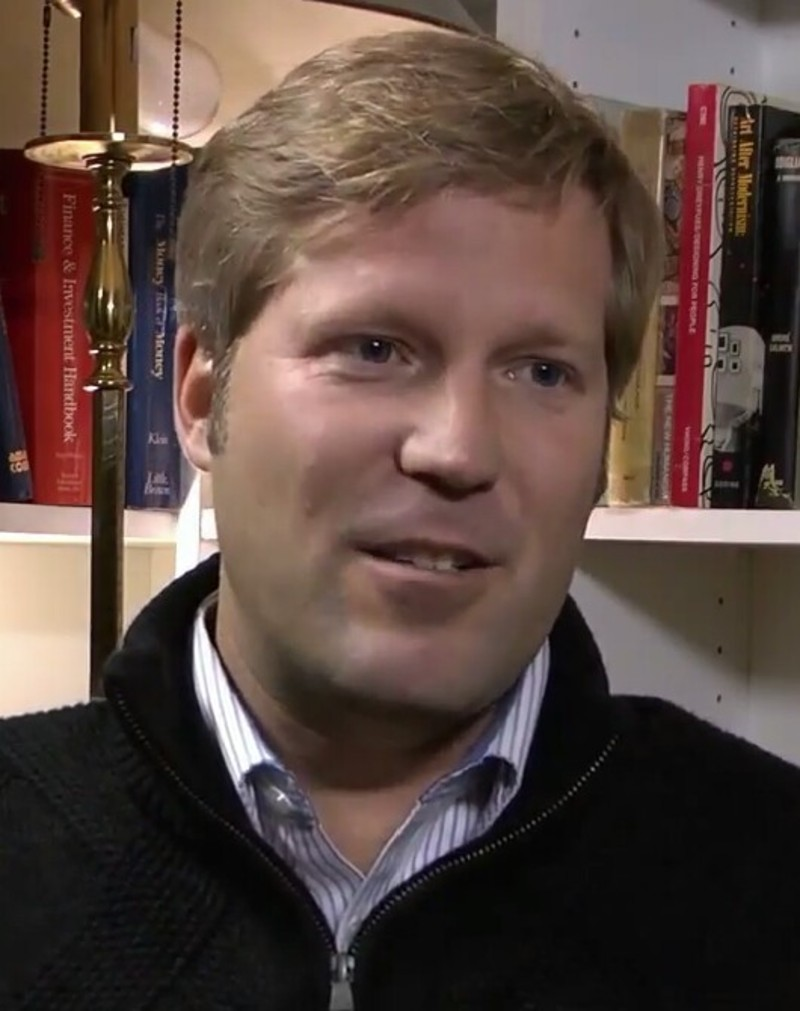

Nominee	Tim Keller	Robert Aragon
Party	Democratic	Republican
Popular vote	270,386	228,019
Percentage	54.3%	45.7%
- Keller: 50–60% 60–70% 70–80% Aragon: 50–60% 60–70% 70–80%
Auditor before election
Hector Balderas
Democratic
Elected Auditor
Tim Keller
Democratic

Incumbent Democratic State Auditor Hector Balderas was term-limited and cannot run for re-election to a third term in office. He was instead running for attorney general. Democratic former state auditor Domingo Martinez had been running, but he withdrew from the race.

Democrat Tim Keller and Republican Robert Aragon were the only candidates running.

New Mexico State Auditor, 2014
Party	Candidate	Votes	%
Democratic	Tim Keller	270,386	54.3
Republican	Robert Aragon	228,019	45.7
Total votes		498,405	100.0
Democratic hold			

== Commissioner of Public Lands ==
2014 New Mexico Commissioner of Public Lands election

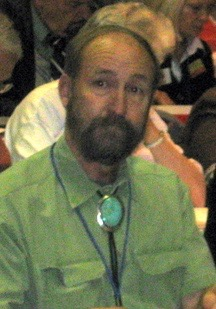
Nominee	Aubrey Dunn Jr.	Ray Powell
Party	Republican	Democratic
Popular vote	250,185	249,481
Percentage	50.1%	49.9%
- Dunn: 50–60% 60–70% 70–80% Powell: 50–60% 60–70% 70–80%
Commissioner before election
Ray Powell
Democratic
Elected Commissioner
Aubrey Dunn Jr.
Republican

Incumbent Democratic Commissioner of Public Lands Ray Powell lost re-election to a second term in office to Republican Aubrey Dunn, the only other candidate running. As of 2026, this is the last time a Republican was elected New Mexico Commissioner of Public Lands.

=== Polling ===
Poll source	Date(s) administered	Sample size	Margin of error	Ray Powell (D)	Aubrey Dunn (R)	Undecided
Gravis Marketing	September 27–October 1, 2014	727	± 4%	43%	37%	20%

=== Results ===
New Mexico Commissioner of Public Lands election, 2014
Party	Candidate	Votes	%
Republican	Aubrey Dunn, Jr.	250,185	50.1
Democratic	Ray Powell (incumbent)	249,481	49.9
Total votes		499,666	100.0
Republican gain from Democratic			

== Public Regulation Commission ==
Three of the five seats on the New Mexico Public Regulation Commission were up for election.

District 2 Republican incumbent Patrick Lyons was unopposed for re-election to a second term in office.

District 4 Democratic incumbent Theresa Becenti-Aguilar was running for re-election to a second term in office. Democrats Edward J. Michael and Lynda Lovejoy were also running. No Republican filed to run for the seat.

District 5 Republican incumbent Ben Hall, the current chairman of the commission, was running for re-election to a second term in office. Democrats Donald L. Wolberg, Merrie Lee Soules, and Sandy R. Jones were also running.

Democrat Ken Miyagishima, the Mayor of Las Cruces, had considered running for a seat on the commission, but decided not to.

== Public Education Commission ==
Seven of the ten seats on the New Mexico Public Education Commission were up for election. Five of the seats were up for regularly scheduled elections. The other two were special elections following resignations.

District 2 incumbent Republican Millie Pogna, District 3 incumbent Democrat Carmie Lynn Toulouse, District 5 incumbent Democrat James F. Conyers and District 6 incumbent Democrat Gilbert Peralta were all running for re-election to a second term unopposed.

District 7 incumbent Democrat Eugene Gant was not running for re-election to a second term. Democrat Patricia E Gipson was running unopposed.

In the District 1 and District 4 vacancies, Democrats former state representative Eleanor Chavez and former president of the American Federation of Teachers Karyl Ann Armbruster ran, respectively, against to-be-determined incumbents, who would be appointed to the office by Governor Martinez.

== United States Senate ==
Incumbent Democratic Senator Tom Udall was running for re-election to a second term.

Businessman and candidate for Governor of New Mexico in 2010 Allen Weh. defeated assistant district attorney and former chairman of the Doña Ana County Republican Party David Clements for the Republican nomination.

United States Senate election in New Mexico, 2014
Party	Candidate	Votes	%
Democratic	Tom Udall (incumbent)	286,409	55.6
Republican	Allen Weh	229,097	44.4
Total votes		515,506	100.0
Democratic hold			

== United States House of Representatives ==
All of New Mexico's three seats in the United States House of Representatives will be up for election in 2014.
