= 2021 New Mexico's 1st congressional district special election =

New Mexico's 1st congressional district special election
- June 1, 2021

New Mexico's 1st congressional district
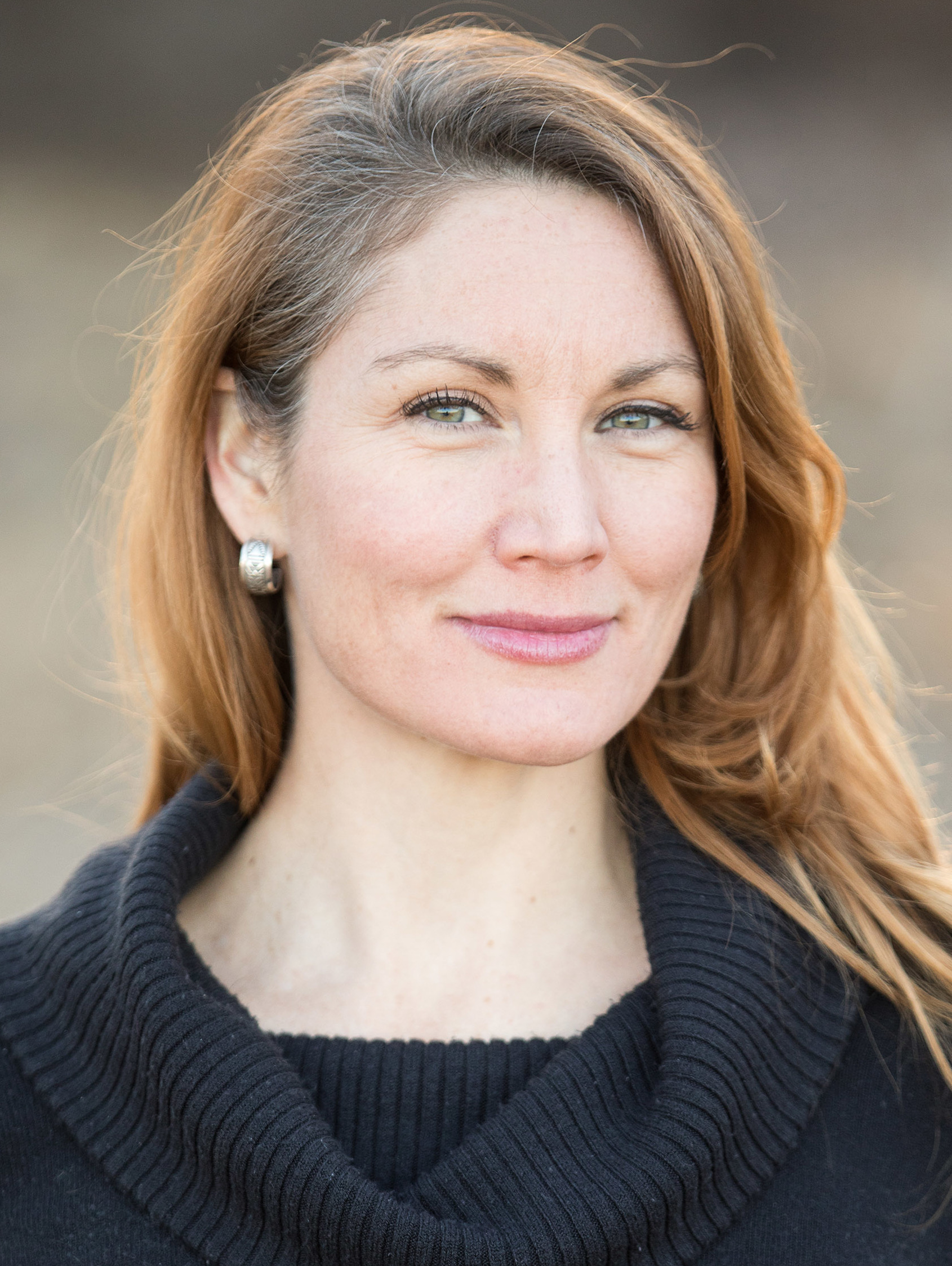

Nominee	Melanie Stansbury	Mark Moores
Party	Democratic	Republican
Popular vote	79,838	47,111
Percentage	60.4%	35.6%
- Stansbury: 40–50% 50–60% 60–70% 60–70% 70–80% 80–90% 90–100% Moores: 40–50% 50–60% 60–70% 70–80% Tie: No votes
U.S. Representative before election
Deb Haaland
Democratic
Elected U.S. Representative
Melanie Stansbury
Democratic

A special election was held on June 1, 2021, to fill the vacancy in New Mexico's 1st congressional district created by Representative Deb Haaland's resignation from the United States House of Representatives to become the Secretary of the Interior in Joe Biden's administration.

State Representatives Patricia Roybal Caballero, Georgene Louis and Melanie Stansbury and state Senator Antoinette Sedillo Lopez sought the Democratic nomination. State Senator Mark Moores, radio host Eddy Aragon and activist Elisa Martinez sought the Republican nomination.

The Democratic Party nominated Stansbury; the Republican Party nominated Moores; the Libertarian Party selected Chris Manning; former Commissioner of Public Lands Aubrey Dunn Jr. ran as an independent. Stansbury won the election with over 60% percent of the vote.

== Background ==
Representative Michelle Lujan Grisham of New Mexico's 1st congressional district announced in 2016, that she would seek the Democratic nomination for the 2018 gubernatorial election. Deb Haaland, the former chair of the Democratic Party of New Mexico, ran for the seat with the Democratic nomination and won in the 2018 election. She was reelected in the 2020 election.

Haaland was selected by President Joe Biden to serve as Secretary of the Interior and she was approved by the United States Senate by a vote of fifty-one to forty. Haaland resigned from her seat on March 16, 2021, and a special election was ordered by the Secretary of State of New Mexico to be held on June 1. Each party's state central committee selected their candidate for the special election instead of using a primary system.

== Democratic committee selection ==
Antoinette Sedillo Lopez, a member of the New Mexico Senate who had run in the 2018 Democratic primary for the seat, and Melanie Stansbury, a member of the New Mexico House of Representatives, announced on December 21, 2020, that they would seek the Democratic nomination for the special election. On January 4, 2021, Georgene Louis, a member of the state house, announced that she would seek the Democratic nomination. Victor Reyes, the legislator director for Governor Lujan Grisham, announced on January 8 that he would seek the Democratic nomination. Patricia Roybal Caballero, a member of the state house, announced her campaign on January 27.

Stansbury won the nomination after defeating Sedillo Lopez, who had placed first in the first round of voting, in the runoff.

=== Candidates ===
==== Selected ====
- Melanie Stansbury, state representative

==== Eliminated in second round ====
- Antoinette Sedillo Lopez, state senator and candidate for New Mexico's 1st congressional district in 2018

==== Eliminated in first round ====
- Francisco Fernández, filmmaker
- Selinda Guerrero, community organizer
- Georgene Louis, state representative
- Randi McGinn, attorney
- Victor Reyes, legislative director for Governor of New Mexico Michelle Lujan Grisham
- Patricia Roybal Caballero, state representative

==== Declined ====
- Javier Martínez, state representative
- Maggie Toulouse Oliver, New Mexico Secretary of State

=== Endorsements ===
Georgene Louis

Individuals

- Mark Ruffalo, actor and producer
- Wes Studi, Cherokee actor and film producer

State legislators

- Ruth Buffalo, North Dakota state representative from district 27 (2018–present)
- Christina Haswood, Kansas state representative from district 10 (2021–present)
- Ponka-We Victors, Kansas state representative from district 103 (2011–present)
Selinda Guerrero

Organizations

- Brand New Congress
Victor Reyes

U.S. representatives

- David Cicilline, U.S. representative from RI-01 (2011–present)
- Chris Pappas, U.S. representative from NH-01 (2019–present)
- Mark Takano, U.S. representative for CA-41 (2013–present)
- Ritchie Torres, U.S. representative from NY-15 (2021–present)
- Marc Veasey, U.S. representative from TX-33 (2013–present)

Organizations

- Equality PAC
- LGBTQ Victory Fund
Antoinette Sedillo Lopez

Organizations

- Center for Biological Diversity Action Fund
- Food & Water Action
- Friends of the Earth Action
- Progressive Democrats of America
Melanie Stansbury

Individuals

- Diane Denish, former lieutenant governor of New Mexico (2003–2011)

Organizations

- 314 Action
- American Federation of State, County and Municipal Employees
- Climate Hawks Vote
- Moms Demand Action
- Sierra Club

==== Convention results ====
Democratic convention results
Candidate	First round votes	First round pct.	Second round votes	Second round pct.
Melanie Stansbury	43	21.61%	103	51.24%
Antoinette Sedillo Lopez	74	37.19%	97	48.26%
Randi McGinn	34	17.09%	Eliminated	
Victor Reyes	18	9.05%	Eliminated	
Selinda Guerrero	13	6.53%	Eliminated	
Georgene Louis	13	6.53%	Eliminated	
Francisco Fernández	2	1.01%	Eliminated	
Patricia Roybal Caballero	1	0.50%	Eliminated	
Abstained	1	0.50%	1	0.50%
Total	199	100%	201	100%

== Republican committee selection ==
State Senator Mark Moores was selected by the Republican state central committee to serve as the Republican candidate in the special election on March 27.

=== Candidates ===
==== Selected ====
- Mark Moores, state senator

==== Not selected ====
- Eddy Aragon, radio host and owner of KIVA-AM
- Michaela Chavez, bookkeeper
- Ronnie Lucero, finance manager
- Elisa Martinez, anti-abortion activist and candidate for U.S. Senate in 2020
- Tracy Trujillo
- Jared Vander Dussen, attorney

==== Withdrew before committee selection ====
- Michelle Garcia Holmes, retired police detective, nominee for Lieutenant Governor of New Mexico in 2018, and nominee for this district in 2020

=== Endorsements ===
Mark Moores

Organizations

- NRA Political Victory Fund
- Republican Party of New Mexico

=== Convention results ===
Republican convention results
Candidate	Votes	Pct.
Mark Moores	49	40%
Eddy Aragon	34	28%
Elisa Martinez	20	17%
Jared Vander Dussen	7	6%
Ronnie Lucero	6	5%
Michaela Chavez	5	4%
Jonathan Gonzalez	0	0%
Total	121	100%

== Libertarian committee selection ==
=== Candidates ===
==== Selected ====
- Chris Manning, staff auditor, Arizona National Guard veteran, and Libertarian candidate for New Mexico's 3rd congressional district in 2018

== Independents ==
Aubrey Dunn Jr., who had served as the New Mexico Commissioner of Public Lands as a Republican and Libertarian, filed to run as an independent for the seat on January 8, 2021. Laura Olivas and Robert Ornelas ran as write-in candidates.

=== Candidates ===
==== Declared ====
- Aubrey Dunn Jr., former Republican-turned-Libertarian New Mexico Commissioner of Public Lands (2015–2019), Republican candidate for New Mexico's 2nd congressional district in 2018, and Libertarian candidate for U.S. Senate in 2018

==== Certified write-in ====
- Laura Olivas
- Robert Ornelas, perennial candidate (previously associated with the American Independent Party)

=== Endorsements ===
Laura Olivas
- Moms Demand Action

== General election ==
=== Predictions ===
Source	Ranking	As of
The Cook Political Report	Likely D	June 1, 2021
Inside Elections	Solid D	May 7, 2021
Sabato's Crystal Ball	Likely D	May 26, 2021

=== Endorsements ===
Melanie Stansbury (D)

Executive branch officials

- Joe Biden, 46th president of the United States (2021–present)
- Deb Haaland, 54th United States Secretary of the Interior (2021–present) and former U.S. representative from NM-01 (2019–2021)

U.S. senators

- Cory Booker, United States senator from New Jersey (2013–present)
- Martin Heinrich, United States senator from New Mexico (2013–present)
- Ben Ray Luján, United States senator from New Mexico (2021–present)
- Elizabeth Warren, United States senator from Massachusetts (2013–present)

U.S. representatives

- Mondaire Jones, U.S. sepresentative from NY-17 (2021–present)
- Nancy Pelosi, 52nd Speaker of the United States House of Representatives (2019–present) and U.S. Representative from CA-12 (1987–present)
- Adam Schiff, U.S. sepresentative from California's 28th congressional district, previously numbered 27th and 29th (2001–present)

State officials

- Diane Denish, former lieutenant governor of New Mexico (2003–2011)
- Michelle Lujan Grisham, 32nd governor of New Mexico (2019–present)

Individuals

- Jill Biden, First Lady of the United States
- Doug Emhoff, Second Gentleman of the United States

Organizations

- 314 Action
- American Federation of State, County and Municipal Employees
- Climate Hawks Vote
- Congressional Progressive Caucus PAC
- EMILY's List
- End Citizens United
- Giffords
- J Street PAC
- League of Conservation Voters
- Let America Vote
- Moms Demand Action
- National Association of Social Workers
- National Wildlife Federation Action Fund
- New Mexico Working Families Party
- Planned Parenthood
- Sierra Club
Mark Moores (R)

Executive branch officials

- Nikki Haley, 29th United States Ambassador to the United Nations (2017–2018) and 116th governor of South Carolina (2011–2017)

U.S. representatives

- Yvette Herrell, U.S. representative from New Mexico's 2nd congressional district (2021–present), member of the New Mexico House of Representatives from the 51st district (2011–2019)
- Ronny Jackson, U.S. representative from Texas's 13th congressional district (2021–present) and 1st Chief Medical Advisor to the President

Newspapers

- Albuquerque Journal

Organizations

- National Federation of Independent Business
- National Right to Life Committee
- NRA Political Victory Fund
- Republican Party of New Mexico
Laura Olvias (I) (write-in)
- Moms Demand Action (co-endorsed with Stansbury)

=== Polling ===
Poll source	Date(s) administered	Sample size (Note: Key: A – all adults RV – registered voters LV – likely voters V – unclear)	Margin of error	Melanie Stansbury (D)	Mark Moores (R)	Aubrey Dunn (I)	Chris Manning (L)	Undecided
RRH Elections (R)	May 18–21, 2021	555 (LV)	± 4.2%	49%	33%	5%	3%	9%

=== Results ===
2021 New Mexico's 1st congressional district special election
Party	Candidate	Votes	%	±%
Democratic	Melanie Stansbury	79,838	60.36%	+2.17%
Republican	Mark Moores	47,111	35.62%	−6.19%
Independent	Aubrey Dunn Jr.	3,534	2.67%	N/A
Libertarian	Chris Manning	1,734	1.31%	N/A
Write-in		46	0.03%	N/A
Total votes		132,263	100.0%	
Democratic hold				

==== By county ====
County	Melanie Stansbury Democratic		Mark Moores Republican		Various candidates Other parties		Margin		Total votes
County	#	%	#	%	#	%	#	%	Total votes
Bernalillo	74,181	61.40%	41,984	34.75%	4,641	3.84%	32,197	26.65%	120,806
Sandoval	3,686	59.36%	2,289	36.86%	235	3.78%	1,397	22.50%	6,210
Santa Fe	611	38.94%	875	55.77%	83	5.29%	−264	−16.83%	1,569
Torrance	945	34.43%	1,503	54.75%	297	10.82%	−558	−20.33%	2,745
Valencia	415	44.58%	460	49.41%	56	6.01%	−45	−4.83%	931
Totals	79,838	60.36%	47,111	35.62%	5,314	4.02%	32,727	24.74%	132,263

== See also ==
- 2021 United States House of Representatives elections
