= W. R. Humphries =

American politician

22nd New Mexico Commissioner of Public Lands
- In office 1987–1990
- Governor: Garrey Carruthers
- Preceded by: Jim Baca
- Succeeded by: Jim Baca

Personal details
- Party: Republican

W. R. Humphries is an American politician who served as the New Mexico Commissioner of Public Lands from 1987 to 1990.

== Background ==
Humphries is a native of New Mexico. A member of the Republican Party, he has worked as a rancher and community advocate. In 2017, Humphries authored an op-ed for The Santa Fe New Mexican, advocating for Public Lands Commissioner Aubrey Dunn Jr.'s proposal to establish the Early Childhood Land Grant Permanent Fund. He lives in Quay County, New Mexico.
