= Melanie Stansbury =

American politician (born 1979)

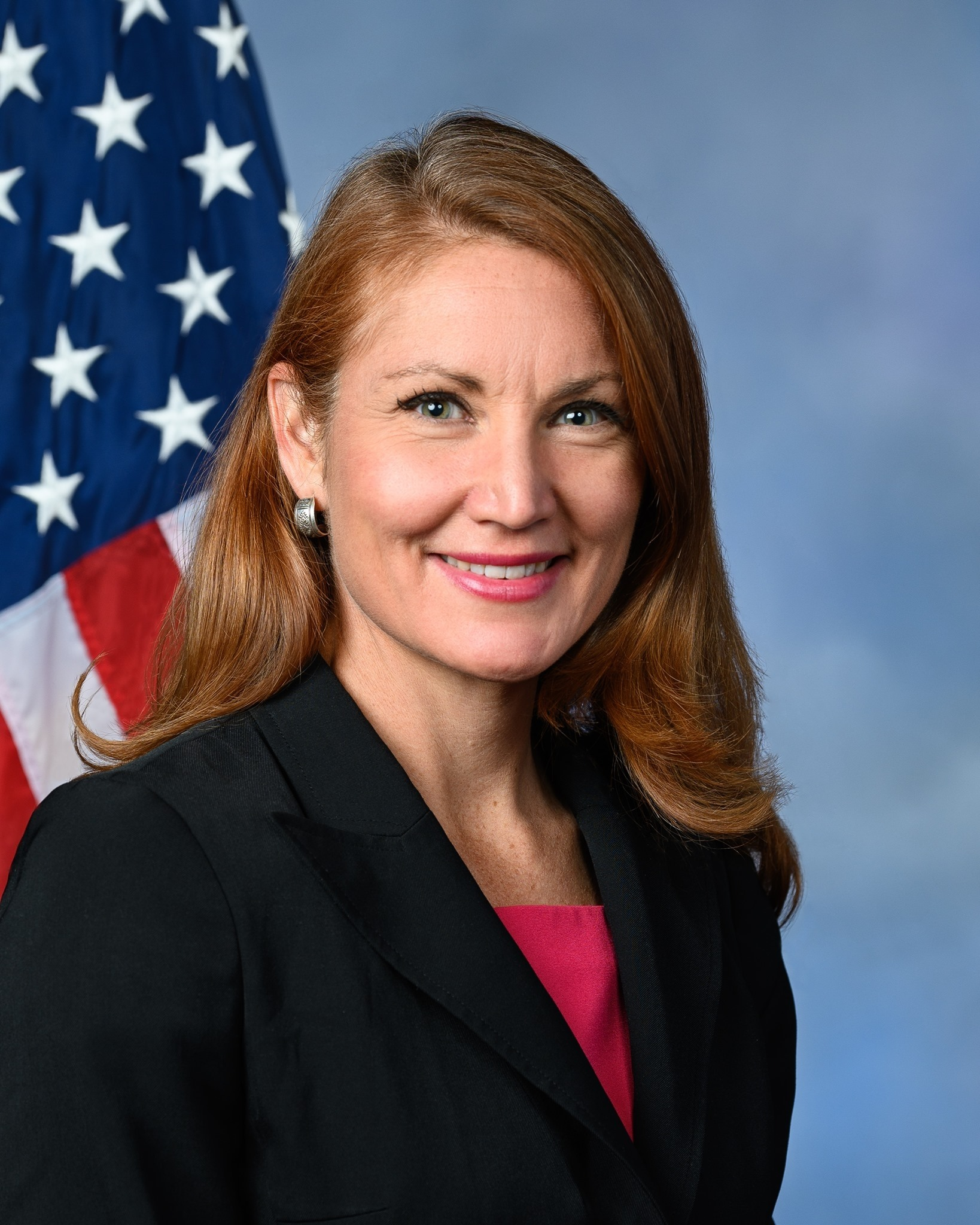
- Official portrait, 2021

Member of the U.S. House of Representatives from New Mexico's 1st district
- Incumbent
- Assumed office June 1, 2021 (Note: Stansbury's official service begins on the date of the special election, while she was not sworn in until June 14, 2021.)
- Preceded by: Deb Haaland

Member of the New Mexico House of Representatives from the 28th district
- In office January 15, 2019 – June 14, 2021
- Preceded by: Jimmie C. Hall
- Succeeded by: Pamelya Herndon

Personal details
- Born: Melanie Ann Stansbury; January 31, 1979 (age 47) Farmington, New Mexico, U.S.
- Party: Democratic
- Education: Saint Mary's College of California (BA); Cornell University (MS)
- Website: House website Campaign website
- Stansbury's voice Stansbury on the benefits of the Infrastructure Investment and Jobs Act. Recorded January 20, 2022

Melanie Ann Stansbury (born January 31, 1979) is an American politician and former ecology instructor serving as the U.S. representative for New Mexico's 1st congressional district since 2021. The district includes the majority of Albuquerque and most of its suburbs. A Democrat, Stansbury previously served as a member of the New Mexico House of Representatives for the 28th district from 2019 to 2021.

== Early life and education ==
Stansbury was born in Farmington, New Mexico, and raised in Albuquerque. After graduating from Cibola High School in 1997, she received a Bachelor of Arts degree in human ecology and natural science from Saint Mary's College of California in 2002. She then received a Master of Science degree in development sociology with a minor in American Indian studies from Cornell University in 2007, where she was a PhD candidate.

== Early career ==
Stansbury began her career as an ecology instructor at the New Mexico Museum of Natural History and Science. As a White House Fellow, she worked as a policy advisor on the Council on Environmental Quality. She was a consultant at Sandia National Laboratories and later served as a program examiner in the Office of Management and Budget during the Obama administration. She worked on the staff of the United States Senate Committee on Energy and Natural Resources and as an aide to Senator Maria Cantwell. Since 2017, she has worked as a consultant and senior advisor at the Utton Transboundary Resources Center of the University of New Mexico.

=== New Mexico House of Representatives ===
Stansbury and U.S. Representative Deb Haaland speak about the Green New Deal in 2019

Stansbury ran unopposed in the 2018 Democratic primary for the 28th district of the New Mexico House of Representatives. In the general election, she defeated Republican incumbent Jimmie C. Hall, who had held the seat for seven terms.

Stansbury was again unopposed in the 2020 primary. She defeated Republican Thomas R. Stull and Libertarian Robert Vaillancourt in the general election.

In the House, Stansbury introduced legislation to improve the energy conservation and water resource management of the state of New Mexico. She served as the vice chair of the Energy, Environment, & Natural Resources Committee.

Upon Stansbury's 2021 resignation from the state legislature in order to run to represent New Mexico in the U.S. House of Representatives, the Bernalillo County Commission appointed Pamelya Herndon as her replacement.

== U.S. House of Representatives ==
=== Elections ===
==== 2021 special ====
After Joe Biden announced Deb Haaland as his nominee for U.S. Interior Secretary, Stansbury announced her campaign for the special election to fill the seat. In the first round of voting by the state Democratic committee, Stansbury placed second after state Senator Antoinette Sedillo Lopez and automatically advanced to the runoff. In the second round of voting, she defeated Sedillo Lopez by six votes. As no Republican had represented the district since 2009, The Santa Fe New Mexican labeled her "a heavy favorite".

She defeated state Senator Mark Moores and former state Lands Commissioner Aubrey Dunn Jr. in the June 1 election in a landslide. Her margin of victory was slightly larger than President Biden's 23-point victory in the district in 2020, and significantly larger than Deb Haaland's in 2020 for the House.

=== Tenure ===
On August 12, 2022, Stansbury voted to pass the Inflation Reduction Act of 2022.

According to a FiveThirtyEight analysis, during the 117th Congress, she voted with President Joe Biden's stated position 100% of the time.

When President Donald Trump entered the House chamber for the 2025 Joint Session of Congress, Stansbury held a sign that said "this is not normal" to protest the mass firing of federal workers.

On November 10, 2026, Stansbury missed the House vote on the impeachment of Pete Hegseth as Secretary of Defense. Stansbury claimed that that a "traffic incident" prevented her from voting.

=== Committee assignments ===
For the 119th Congress:

- Committee on Natural Resources
  - Subcommittee on Federal Lands
  - Subcommittee on Water, Wildlife and Fisheries
- Committee on Oversight and Government Reform
  - Subcommittee on Delivering on Government Efficiency (Ranking Member)

=== Caucus memberships ===
- Congressional Progressive Caucus
- Congressional LGBTQ+ Equality Caucus
- Congressional Wildlife Refuge Caucus
- Democratic Women's Caucus
- Rare Disease Caucus

== Political positions ==
In a 2021 candidate questionnaire created by the Adelante Progressive Caucus, Stansbury pledged support for Medicare for All legislation, a federal assault weapons ban, the D.C. statehood movement, canceling student loan debt, federal marijuana legalization, and several other progressive policies. She was endorsed by abortion rights group Voteprochoice.

On March 1, 2025, Stansbury participated in the discussion at the "Know The Assignment" webinar held by WomenForward.

== Personal life ==
Stansbury lives in Albuquerque.

== Electoral history ==
Year	Office	Party	Votes for Stansbury	%	Opponent	Party	Votes	%
2018	New Mexico House of Representatives	✓ Democratic	7,335	53.7	Jimmie C. Hall (inc.)	Republican	6,326	46.3
2020	New Mexico House of Representatives	✓ Democratic	8,908	52.6	Thomas R. Stull (Note: Libertarian Robert Vaillancourt received 780 votes (4.6%).)	Republican	7,252	42.8
2021	U.S. House of Representatives	✓ Democratic	79,837	60.4	Mark Moores (Note: Independent Aubrey Dunn Jr. received 3,534 votes (2.7%) and Libertarian Chris Manning received 1,734 (1.3%).)	Republican	47,111	35.6
2022	U.S. House of Representatives	✓ Democratic	156,462	55.7	Michelle Garcia Holmes	Republican	124,151	44.2
2024	U.S. House of Representatives	✓ Democratic	193,203	56.4	Steve Jones	Republican	149,546	43.6

== See also ==
- Women in the United States House of Representatives

== Notes ==
U.S. House of Representatives
Preceded by Deb Haaland	Member of the U.S. House of Representatives from New Mexico's 1st congressional district 2021–present	Incumbent
U.S. order of precedence (ceremonial)
Preceded by Troy Carter	United States representatives by seniority 282nd	Succeeded by Jake Ellzey
