= Jim Baca =

American politician from New Mexico

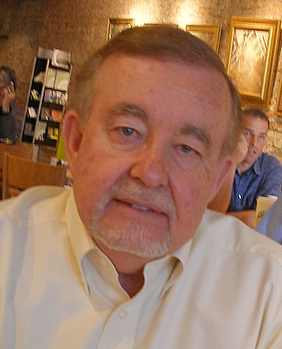

27th Mayor of Albuquerque
- In office December 1, 1997 – November 30, 2001
- Preceded by: Martin Chávez
- Succeeded by: Martin Chávez

12th Director of the Bureau of Land Management
- In office May 19, 1993 – February 3, 1994
- President: Bill Clinton
- Preceded by: Cy Jamison
- Succeeded by: Patrick Shea

21st and 23rd New Mexico Commissioner of Public Lands
- In office January 1, 1991 – May 19, 1993
- Governor: Bruce King
- Preceded by: W. R. Humphries
- Succeeded by: Ray Powell
- In office January 1, 1983 – January 1, 1987
- Governor: Toney Anaya
- Preceded by: Alex J. Armijo
- Succeeded by: W. R. Humphries

Personal details
- Born: September 6, 1945 (age 80) Albuquerque, New Mexico, U.S.
- Party: Democratic

James R. Baca (born September 6, 1945) is an American politician from New Mexico. A member of the Democratic Party, Baca served twice as New Mexico commissioner of public lands from 1983 to 1987 and from 1991 to 1993 and as 27th mayor of Albuquerque from 1997 to 2001.

== Career ==
=== Bureau of Land Management ===
In 1993, Baca was appointed Director of the Bureau of Land Management in the administration of Bill Clinton, but was fired the next year amidst tensions with United States Secretary of the Interior Bruce Babbitt and Western state governors.

=== Campaigns ===
Baca had run unsuccessfully for mayor of Albuquerque and the United States House of Representatives in 1985 and 1988, respectively. He challenged incumbent Governor Bruce King in the 1994 Democratic gubernatorial primary, but came third behind King and Lieutenant Governor Casey Luna.

=== Mayor of Albuquerque ===
He was elected mayor of Albuquerque in 1997, but in his re-election bid he finished a distant fourth place in the 2001 mayoral election, won by his predecessor Martin Chávez. He ran to reclaim his previous position as Public Lands Commissioner in 2006, narrowly winning the Democratic primary against Ray Powell (who had succeeded him in that office in 1993), but losing the general election to incumbent Republican Lands Commissioner Patrick H. Lyons. He then served as state Natural Resource Trustee until his retirement in 2009.

As Mayor of Albuquerque, Baca also made an effort to lure the Canadian minor league baseball team the Calgary Cannons to Albuquerque with promises of a new $28 million stadium. The effort succeeded and the team was renamed The Albuquerque Isotopes. The move became part of the basis of a 2001 episode of The Simpsons, titled "Hungry, Hungry Homer," which features the owners of the Springfield Isotopes attempted to move their team to Albuquerque.

== See also ==
- Baca family of New Mexico

Party political offices
Preceded by Alex J. Armijo	Democratic nominee for New Mexico Commissioner of Public Lands; 1982, 1986, 1990	Succeeded by Ray Powell
Preceded by Art Trujillo	Democratic nominee for New Mexico Commissioner of Public Lands; 2006	Succeeded by Ray Powell
Political offices
Preceded by Alex J. Armijo	New Mexico Commissioner of Public Lands; January 1, 1983 – January 1, 1987	Succeeded by W. R. Humphries
Preceded by W. R. Humphries	New Mexico Commissioner of Public Lands; January 1, 1991 – May 19, 1993	Succeeded by Ray Powell
Preceded by Martin Chávez	Mayor of Albuquerque; December 1, 1997 – November 30, 2001	Succeeded by Martin Chávez
Government offices
Preceded by Cy Jamison	Director of the Bureau of Land Management; May 19, 1993 – February 3, 1994	Succeeded by Patrick Shea
