= Ray Powell (New Mexico politician) =

American politician and veterinarian

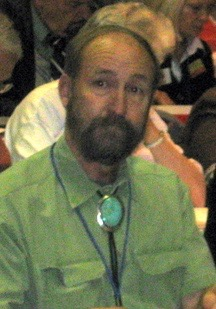

24th and 26th New Mexico Commissioner of Public Lands
- In office January 1, 2011 – January 1, 2015
- Governor: Susana Martinez
- Preceded by: Patrick H. Lyons
- Succeeded by: Aubrey Dunn Jr.
- In office May 19, 1993 – January 1, 2003
- Governor: Bruce King; Gary Johnson
- Preceded by: Jim Baca
- Succeeded by: Patrick H. Lyons

Personal details
- Born: Ray Bennett Powell Albuquerque, New Mexico, U.S.
- Party: Democratic
- Spouse: Jean Sivikly
- Education: University of New Mexico (BS, MS); Tufts University (DVM)

Ray Bennett Powell is an American politician and veterinarian from the state of New Mexico. He served as New Mexico Commissioner of Public Lands from 1993 until 2003, and again from 2011 until 2015.

== Early life and education ==
Powell was born in Albuquerque, New Mexico. He earned a Bachelor of Science degree in anthropology and biology from University of New Mexico, a Master of Science in botany and plant ecology from UNM, and a Doctorate in Veterinary Medicine from Tufts University, with an emphasis in wildlife medicine.

== Career ==
Powell entered politics in 1993 after he was appointed New Mexico commissioner of public lands by Governor Bruce King. He was elected to a full term in 1994 and reelected in 1998. Due to term limits, Powell could not run again in 2002. He ran again in 2006 and narrowly lost to Jim Baca, whom he had succeeded in 1993, in the Democratic primary. Powell ran once again in 2010 and this time was successful. He lost in 2014 to Republican Aubrey Dunn Jr. by a margin of 704 votes out of nearly 500,000 cast.

Prior to his election as Commissioner in 2010, Powell worked with scientist and humanitarian Jane Goodall and for the Jane Goodall Institute. Powell served as the elected state land commissioner from 1993 to 2002 and from 2011 to 2014. He was the president and vice-president of the 22-member Western States Land Commissioners Association from 1996 to 1998. He served as a special assistant to Governor Bruce King with responsibility for environment, natural resources, health, and recreation. Powell served two terms as a member of the United States Department of Agriculture Committee on Foreign Animal and Poultry Diseases. In this capacity he gained significant expertise in understanding the impacts of disease and other pathogens on our human and domestic and wild animal populations. Powell served as a member of the New Mexico Board of Veterinary Regulation and Licensing from 2002 to 2010. He was the chairman of the board for much of his tenure, focusing on the humane treatment of animals.

== Personal life ==
Powell is married to Jean Civikly-Powell, a professor emerita of Communication at the University of New Mexico. She has served as Ombudsperson for the UNM faculty since 1999.
