= Aubrey Dunn Jr. =

American politician from New Mexico

27th Public Lands Commissioner of New Mexico
- In office January 1, 2015 – January 1, 2019
- Governor: Susana Martinez
- Preceded by: Ray Powell
- Succeeded by: Stephanie Garcia Richard

Personal details
- Born: January 21, 1956 (age 70) Alamogordo, New Mexico, U.S.
- Party: Independent (2021–present)
- Other political affiliations: Republican (before 2018); Libertarian (2018–2021)
- Spouse: Robin Dunn
- Children: 3
- Parent: Aubrey Dunn Sr.
- Education: Colorado State University (BS)
- Website: Campaign website

Aubrey Lyle Dunn Jr. (born 1955 or 1956) is an American politician and banker from the state of New Mexico. He served as New Mexico commissioner of public lands from 2015 to 2019, and was a candidate for the U.S. Senate in the 2018 election. Elected as a Republican, Dunn switched parties to Libertarian in January 2018, making him the first Libertarian holder of a statewide elected office in the United States.

== Early life and education ==
Dunn was born in Alamogordo, New Mexico, the son of politician Aubrey Dunn Sr and his wife, Betty Jo McClendon. He earned a Bachelor of Science degree in animal science from Colorado State University.

== Career ==
Dunn worked for 25 years in the banking industry including 10 years as CEO and president of First Federal Bank of New Mexico. In 2008, he was an unsuccessful candidate for Congress in New Mexico's 2nd congressional district. He lost in the Republican primary to Edward R. Tinsley, who went on to lose the general election to Harry Teague.

Dunn was elected as New Mexico commissioner of public lands in the 2014 election as the Republican nominee. In January 2018, he left the Republican Party and switched his voter registration to Libertarian. Dunn announced his candidacy as a Libertarian for U.S. Senate in early-2018. He withdrew from the race in July, stating that he was leaving the race because he needed to concentrate his time and effort on his duties as land commissioner. He was replaced on the ballot by former New Mexico governor Gary Johnson.

In 2021, Dunn announced his candidacy for the 2021 New Mexico's 1st congressional district special election, running as an independent. He faced State Representative Melanie Stansbury and State Senator Mark Moores in the June 1 election. Dunn received less than 3% of the total vote.

== Personal life ==
Dunn Jr. is the son of late New Mexico state senator Aubrey Dunn Sr., who served in the legislature from 1965 until 1980 as a Democrat. His wife, Robin Dunn, ran for lieutenant governor of New Mexico as a Libertarian with Bob Walsh. His son, A. Blair Dunn, ran for attorney general as a Libertarian.

== Electoral history ==
| Year | Office | Party | Votes for Dunn | % | Opponent | Party | Votes | % |
|---|---|---|---|---|---|---|---|---|
| 2012 | New Mexico State Senate, District 39 | Republican | 8,195 | 44.7% | Phil Griego | ✓ Democratic | 10,148 | 55.3% |
| 2014 | New Mexico Land Commissioner | ✓ Republican | 250,185 | 50.1% | Ray Powell | Democratic | 249,481 | 49.9% |
| 2018 | Libertarian primary for 2018 U.S. Senate in New Mexico | ✓ Libertarian | 623 | 100% | Unopposed, withdrew before the general election | | | |
| 2021 | New Mexico's 1st congressional district special election | Independent | 3,524 | 2.7% | Melanie Stansbury (Note: Republican Mark Moores received 46,977 votes (35.7%) and Libertarian Chris Manning received 1,736 (1.3%).) | ✓ Democratic | 79,208 | 60.3% |

== See also ==
- List of American politicians who switched parties in office
- Libertarian Party of New Mexico

== Notes ==
Party political offices
| Preceded by Matthew Rush | Republican nominee for Public Lands Commissioner of New Mexico; 2014 | Succeeded by Patrick Lyons |
| First | Libertarian nominee for U.S. Senator from New Mexico (Class 1); Withdrew; 2018 | Succeeded by Gary Johnson |
Political offices
| Preceded by Ray Powell | Public Lands Commissioner of New Mexico; January 1, 2015 – January 1, 2019 | Succeeded by Stephanie Garcia Richard |
