= 2001 Albuquerque mayoral election =

- October 2, 2001
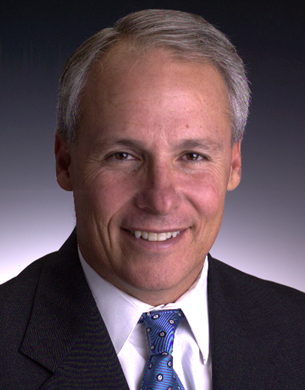

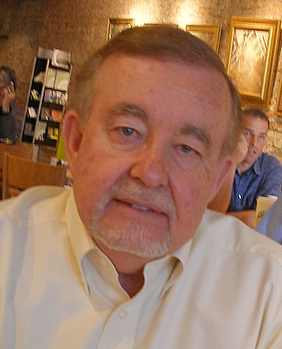
Candidate	Martin Chávez	Bob Schwartz
Party	Nonpartisan	Nonpartisan
Popular vote	30,292	27,490
Percentage	30.56%	27.73%
Candidate	Mike McEntee	Jim Baca
Party	Nonpartisan	Nonpartisan
Popular vote	11,176	10,999
Percentage	11.28%	11.10%
Mayor before election
Jim Baca
Nonpartisan
Elected mayor
Martin Chávez
Nonpartisan

The 2001 Albuquerque mayoral election took place on October 2, 2001. Incumbent Mayor Jim Baca ran for re-election to a second term. He faced a crowded field of competitors, including former Mayor Martin Chávez, the Democratic nominee for Governor in 1998; former District Attorney Bob Schwartz; City Councilors Mike McEntee and Alan Armijo; and former State Treasurer James B. Lewis.

Chávez ultimately won the election by a narrow margin, receiving 31 percent of the vote to Schwartz's 28 percent, while Baca came in third with 11 percent.

== General election ==
=== Candidates ===
- Martin Chávez, former Mayor
- Bob Schwartz, former District Attorney
- Mike McEntee, City Councilor
- Jim Baca, incumbent Mayor
- Richard W. Homans, businessman and publisher
- James B. Lewis, former State Treasurer
- Alan B. Armijo, City Councilor

==== Dropped out ====
- Frank Crosby, sports promoter
- Greg Payne, City Councilor

=== Campaign ===
Baca, a controversial mayor, delayed his announcement that he would seek re-election until June 10, 2001, campaigning on his support of environmental protection and opposition to urban sprawl. At the time that Baca announced his campaign, he was one of the last candidates in the race. Chávez, who served a term as Mayor before running for Governor in 1998, emerged as one of the frontrunners in the race, emphasizing his accomplishments as Mayor. Though the race was formally nonpartisan, McEntee and Schwartz were the only two registered Republicans in the race, and McEntee won the endorsement of the Bernalillo County Republican Party.

The Albuquerque Tribune endorsed Baca for re-election, praising downtown Albuquerque's "tremendous renaissance, buttressed by private business, in which [Baca] has invested substantial time and energy," for supporting a tax increase to repair roads, and for managing the city's growth. The Albuquerque Journal, though praising Baca for "accomplish[ing] a great deal in his four years in office," endorsed Schwartz, whom it said "has the potential to remake the office of Albuquerque mayor for the better." The Journal praised Schwartz's "rare combination of intelligence and public persona" and as "the kind of mayor who will get up in front of people and tell them what he intends to do. If they approve, he'll go; if the people have other ideas, he'll listen and modify his plans."

=== Polling ===
Poll source	Date(s) administered	Sample size (Note: Key: A – all adults RV – registered voters LV – likely voters V – unclear)	Margin of error	Martin Chávez	Bob Schwartz	Jim Baca	Rick Homans	Mike McEntee	James B. Lewis	Alan Armijo	Undecided
Research & Polling Inc.	August 14–16, 2001	470 (LV)	± 4.5%	29%	16%	10%	10%	5%	2%	3%	25%
Research & Polling Inc.	September 18–20, 2001	515 (LV)	± 4.3%	25%	13%	10%	10%	9%	3%	3%	27%

=== Results ===
2001 Albuquerque mayoral election results
Party	Candidate	Votes	%
Nonpartisan	Martin Chávez	30,292	30.56%
Nonpartisan	Bob Schwartz	27,490	27.73%
Nonpartisan	Mike McEntee	11,176	11.28%
Nonpartisan	Jim Baca	10,999	11.10%
Nonpartisan	Rick Homans	9,737	9.82%
Nonpartisan	James B. Lewis	6,747	6.81%
Nonpartisan	Alan Armijo	2,570	2.59%
Write-in		108	0.11%
Total votes		99,119	100.00%
