= Gary Johnson =

American politician and businessman (born 1953)

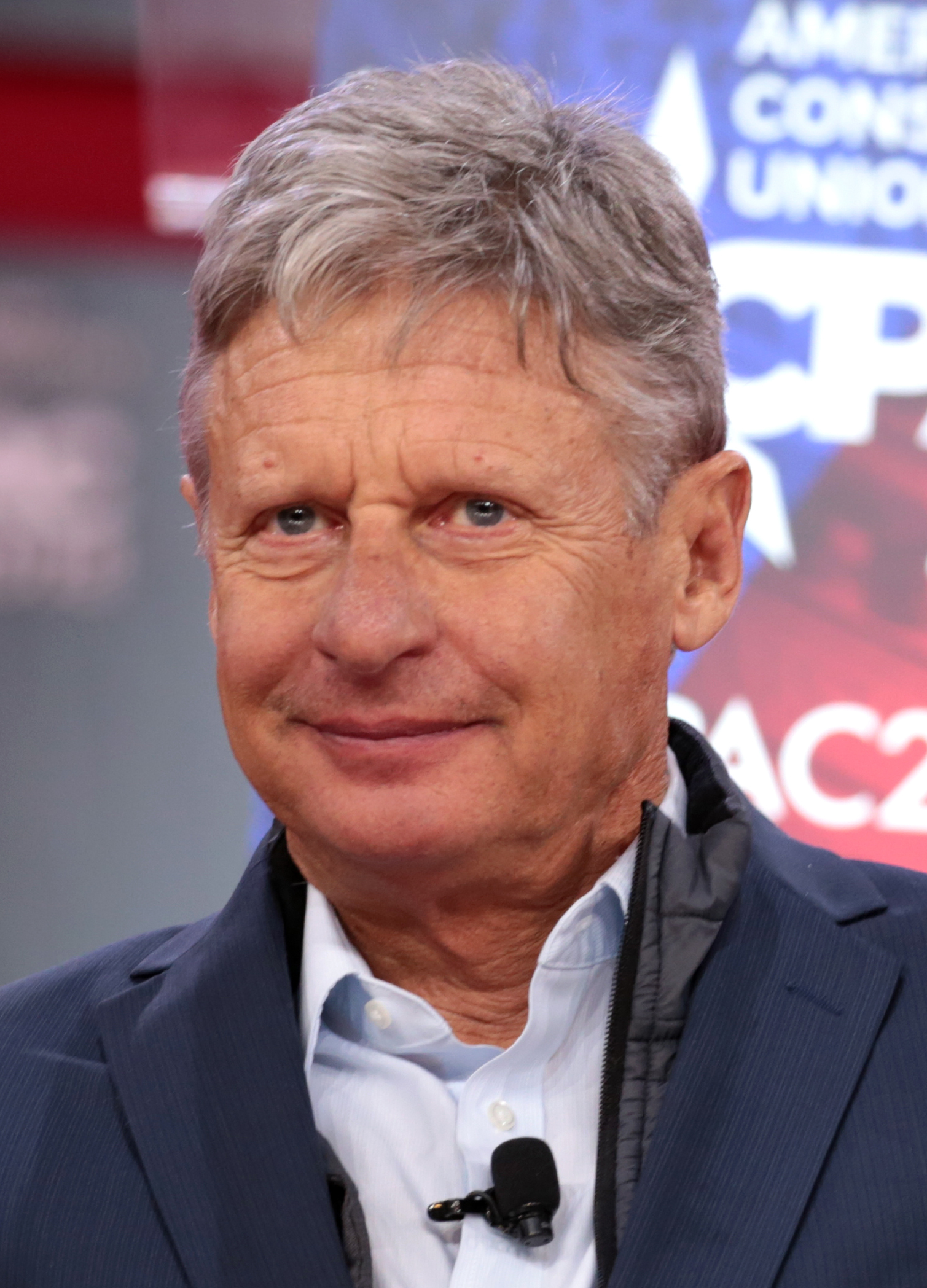
- Johnson in 2018

29th Governor of New Mexico
- In office January 1, 1995 – January 1, 2003
- Lieutenant: Walter Bradley
- Preceded by: Bruce King
- Succeeded by: Bill Richardson

Personal details
- Born: Gary Earl Johnson; January 1, 1953 (age 73) Minot, North Dakota, U.S.
- Party: Republican (before 2011); Libertarian (2011–present)
- Spouse: Denise Simms (m. 1977; div. 2005)
- Domestic partner: Kate Prusack (engaged 2009)
- Children: 2
- Education: University of New Mexico (BS)
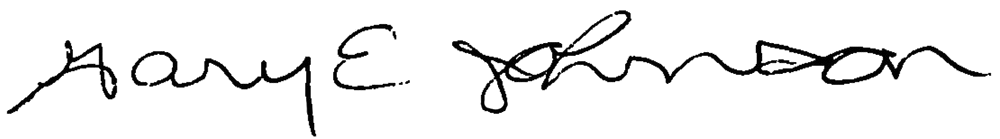
- Signature

Gary Earl Johnson (born January 1, 1953) is an American businessman and politician who served as the 29th governor of New Mexico from 1995 to 2003 as a member of the Republican Party. He has been a member of the Libertarian Party since 2011 and was the party's nominee in the 2012 and 2016 presidential elections. He was also the Libertarian nominee in the 2018 U.S. Senate election in New Mexico.

Born in Minot, North Dakota, Johnson attended the University of New Mexico, where he earned a Bachelor of Science. He entered politics for the first time by running for governor of New Mexico in 1994 on a low-tax, anti-crime platform, promising a "common-sense business approach". He defeated incumbent Democratic governor Bruce King, 50% to 40%—part of the Republican Revolution that year. He cut the 10% annual growth in the budget, in part by using the gubernatorial veto 200 times during his first six months. He was unable to convince the state senate to pass any of his motions. Johnson sought reelection in 1998, winning by 55% to 45%. In his second term, he concentrated on the issue of school voucher reforms as well as campaigning for cannabis decriminalization. During his tenure as governor, Johnson adhered to an anti-tax policy, setting state and national records for the number of times he used his veto power: more than the other 49 contemporary governors put together. Term-limited, Johnson retired from front-line politics in 2003.

Johnson ran for president in 2012, initially as a Republican on a libertarian platform emphasizing the United States public debt and a balanced budget, protection of civil liberties, military non-interventionism, replacement of income tax with the FairTax, and opposition to the war on drugs. In December 2011, he withdrew his candidacy for the Republican nomination and ran for the Libertarian nomination instead, winning the nomination in May 2012. Johnson received 1.3 million votes (1%), more than all other minor candidates combined.

Johnson ran again for President in 2016, once again winning the Libertarian nomination. He named former Republican governor of Massachusetts Bill Weld as his running mate. Johnson received nearly 4.5 million votes (3.3% of the total vote), which is the most for a third-party presidential candidate since 1996 and the highest national vote share for a Libertarian candidate in history. After the 2016 presidential election, Johnson said he would not run for president again. He ran for the U.S. Senate as a Libertarian in the 2018 New Mexico senate race against incumbent Democratic senator Martin Heinrich, coming in third with 15.4% of the statewide vote (107,201 votes). Johnson has since maintained a low profile and has had little involvement in politics.

== Early life and career ==
Johnson as a high school senior, 1971

Johnson was born on January 1, 1953, in Minot, North Dakota, the son of Lorraine B. (née Bostow), who worked for the Bureau of Indian Affairs, and Earl W. Johnson, a public school teacher and World War II Army veteran who participated in the Invasion of Normandy and fought at the Battle of Bastogne, earning three Purple Hearts during his service in the 101st Airborne Division. In 1971, Johnson graduated from Sandia High School in Albuquerque, New Mexico, where he was on the school track team. He attended the University of New Mexico (UNM) from 1971 to 1975 and graduated with a Bachelor of Science degree in political science. While at UNM, he joined the Sigma Alpha Epsilon fraternity. It was there that he met his future wife, Denise "Dee" Simms.

While in college, Johnson earned money as a door-to-door handyman. His success in that industry encouraged him to start his own business, Big J Enterprises, in 1976. When he started the business, which focused on mechanical contracting, Johnson was its only employee. His firm's major break came when he received a large contract from Intel's expansion in Rio Rancho, which increased Big J's revenue to $38 million.

To cope with the growth of the company, Johnson enrolled in a time management course at night school, which he credits with making him heavily goal driven. He eventually grew Big J into a multimillion-dollar corporation with over 1,000 employees. By the time he sold the company in 1999, it was one of New Mexico's leading construction companies.

== Governor of New Mexico (1995–2003) ==
=== First term ===
Johnson entered politics in 1994 with the intention of running for governor and was advised by "Republican Elders" to run for the State Legislature instead. Despite their advice, Johnson spent $500,000 of his own money and entered the race with the intent of bringing a "common sense business approach" to the office. Johnson's campaign slogan was "People before Politics". His platform emphasized tax cuts, job creation, state government spending growth restraint, and law and order. He won the Republican nomination, defeating state legislator Richard P. Cheney by 34% to 33%, with John Dendahl and former governor David F. Cargo in third and fourth. Johnson subsequently won a plurality in the three-way general election, defeating the incumbent Governor Bruce King (a relatively conservative Democrat) and the former Lieutenant Governor Roberto Mondragón (who ran as a Green) with just under 50% of the vote. Johnson was elected in a nationally Republican year, although party registration in the state of New Mexico at the time was 2-to-1 Democratic.

As governor, Johnson followed a strict small-government approach. According to former New Mexico Republican National Committee member Mickey D. Barnett, "Any time someone approached him about legislation for some purpose, his first response always was to ask if government should be involved in that to begin with." He vetoed 200 of 424 bills passed in his first six months in office – a national record of 47% of all legislation – and used the line-item veto on most remaining bills. In office, Johnson fulfilled his campaign promise to reduce the 10% annual growth of the state budget. In his first budget, Johnson proposed a wide range of tax cuts, including a repeal of the prescription drug tax, a $47 million income tax cut, and a 6-cents-per-gallon gasoline tax cut. However, of these, only the gasoline tax cut was passed. During the November 1995 federal government shutdown, he joined 20 other Republican governors who called on the Republican leadership in Congress to stand firm against the Clinton administration in budget negotiations; in the article reporting on the letter and concomitant news conference he was quoted as calling for eliminating the budget deficit through proportional cuts across the budget. Although Johnson worked to reduce overall state spending, in his first term he raised education spending by nearly a third. When drop-out rates and test scores showed little improvement, Johnson changed his tactics and began advocating school vouchers – a key issue in budget battles of his second term as governor.

=== Second term ===
In 1998, Johnson ran for reelection as governor against Democratic Albuquerque Mayor Martin Chávez. In his campaign, Johnson promised to continue the policies of his first term: improving schools; cutting state spending, taxes, and bureaucracy; and frequent use of his veto and line-item veto power. Fielding a strong Hispanic candidate in a 40% Hispanic state, the Democrats were expected to oust Johnson, but Johnson won by a margin of 55% to 45%. This made him the first governor of New Mexico to serve two successive four-year terms after term limits were expanded to two terms in 1991. Johnson made the promotion of a school voucher system a "hallmark issue" of his second term. In 1999, he proposed the first statewide voucher system in America, which would have enrolled 100,000 students in its first year.

That year, he vetoed two budgets that failed to include a voucher program and a government shutdown was threatened, but ultimately yielded to Democratic majorities in both houses of the New Mexico Legislature, who opposed the plan. Johnson signed the budget, but line-item vetoed a further $21 million, or 1%, from the legislative plan. In 1999, Johnson became one of the highest-ranking elected officials in the US to advocate the legalization of marijuana. Saying the war on drugs was "an expensive bust", he advocated the decriminalization of marijuana use and concentration on harm-reduction measures for all other illegal drugs. He compared attempts to enforce the nation's drug laws with the failed attempt at alcohol prohibition. In remarks in 2011, he noted: "Half of what government spends on police, courts and prisons is to deal with drug offenders." He suggested that drug abuse be treated as a health issue, not as a criminal issue. His approach to the issue garnered supportive notice from conservative icon William F. Buckley, as well as the Cato Institute and Rolling Stone.

In 2000, Johnson proposed a more ambitious voucher program than he had proposed the year before, under which each parent would receive $3,500 per child for education at any private or parochial school. The Democrats sought $90m extra school funding without school vouchers, and questioned Johnson's request for more funding for state-run prisons, having opposed his opening of two private prisons. Negotiations between the governor and the legislature were contentious, again nearly leading to a government shutdown. In 2000, New Mexico was devastated by the Cerro Grande Fire. Johnson's handling of the disaster earned him accolades from The Denver Post, which observed that:

Johnson.....was all over the Cerro Grande Fire last week. He helped reporters understand where the fire was headed when low-level Forest Service officials couldn't, ran herd over the bureaucratic process of getting state and federal agencies and the National Guard involved, and even helped put out some of the fire with his feet. On a tour of Los Alamos last Wednesday, when he saw small flames spreading across a lawn, he had his driver stop his car. He jumped out and stomped on the flames, as did his wife and some of his staffers.

Johnson's leadership during the fire was praised by Democratic Congressman Tom Udall, who said: "I think the real test of leadership is when you have circumstances like this. He's called on his reserves of energy and has just been a really excellent leader under very difficult circumstances here." Johnson rebuffed efforts by the Libertarian Party to draft him in the 2000 presidential election, stating himself to be a Republican with no interest in running for president.

=== Reception ===
According to anonymous sources, Governor Johnson was known for a lack of interest in policy details and those who worked with Johnson at the time "recall a chief executive who would speed through meetings and often preferred to discuss his fitness routine than focus on the minutiae of policymaking". In his first term, he frequently clashed with the legislature, but in the second term, he "became more comfortable with the limits of his executive power" and took a more conciliatory approach.

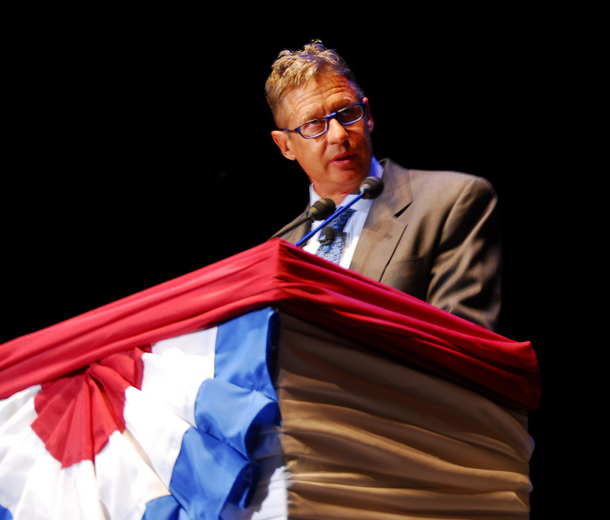
Johnson at Ron Paul's "Rally for the Republic" in 2008

Commentator Andrew Sullivan quoted a claim that Johnson "is highly regarded in the state for his outstanding leadership during two terms as governor. He slashed the size of state government during his term and left the state with a large budget surplus." In an interview in Reason in January 2001, Johnson's accomplishments in office were described as follows: "no tax increases in six years, a major road building program, shifting Medicaid to managed care, constructing two new private prisons, canning 1,200 state employees, and vetoing a record number of bills". According to one New Mexico paper, "Johnson left the state fiscally solid" and was "arguably the most popular governor of the decade... leaving the state with a $1 billion budget surplus". The Washington Times reported that when Johnson left office, "the size of state government had been substantially reduced and New Mexico was enjoying a large budget surplus." In a 2016 National Review article, Johnson was criticized for claiming to have balanced New Mexico's budget every year. The Constitution of New Mexico requires that the state budget be balanced, with its debt in a separate "capital outlay" budget. The article stated that under Johnson New Mexico's debt increased from $1.8 billion to $4.6 billion and its budget increased from $4.397 billion to $7.721 billion.

According to a 2011 profile of Johnson in the National Review, "During his tenure, he vetoed more bills than the other 49 governors combined – 750 in total, one third of which had been introduced by Republican legislators. Johnson also used his line-item-veto power thousands of times. He credits his heavy veto pen for eliminating New Mexico's budget deficit and cutting the growth rate of New Mexico's government in half." According to the Myrtle Beach Sun News, Johnson "said his numerous vetoes, only two of which were overridden, stemmed from his philosophy of looking at all things for their cost–benefit ratio and his axe fell on Republicans as well as Democrats".

While in office, Johnson was criticized for opposing funding for an independent study of private prisons after a series of riots and killings at the facilities. Martin Chavez, his opponent in the 1998 New Mexico gubernatorial race, criticized Johnson for his frequent vetoing of programs, suggesting that it resulted in New Mexico's low economic and social standing nationally. Journalist Mark Ames described Johnson as "a hard-core conservative" who "ruled the state like a right-wing authoritarian" and only embraced marijuana legalization in his second term for populist gain. This was mainly in reference to a commercial from Johnson's reelection campaign featuring Johnson saying that a felon in New Mexico would serve "every lousy second" of their prison sentence. Johnson insisted, however, that the commercial was directed at "the guy who's got his gun out" rather than nonviolent drug offenders.

=== Post governorship ===
Johnson was term limited and could not run for a third consecutive term as governor in 2002. In the 2008 presidential election campaign, Johnson endorsed Ron Paul for the Republican nomination, "because of his commitment to less government, greater liberty, and lasting prosperity for America". Johnson spoke at Paul's "Rally for the Republic" on September 2, 2008.

Johnson serves on the Advisory Council of Students for Sensible Drug Policy, a student nonprofit organization which advocates for drug policy reform.

As of April 2011, he serves on the board of directors of Students For Liberty, a nonprofit libertarian organization. His first book, Seven Principles of Good Government, was published on August 1, 2012.

== 2012 presidential campaign ==
=== Early campaign ===
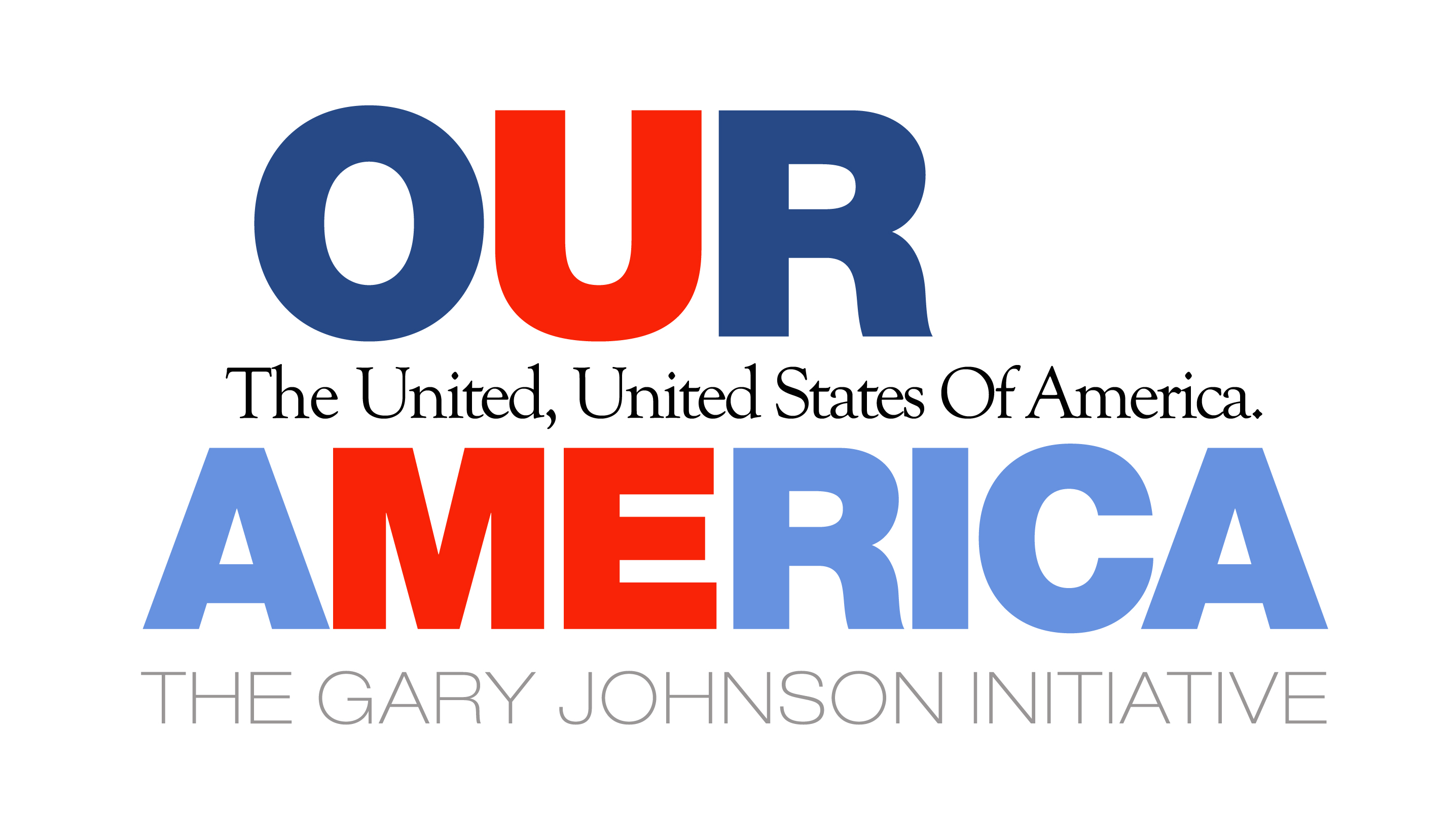
Logo of the Our America Initiative, which Johnson founded in 2009

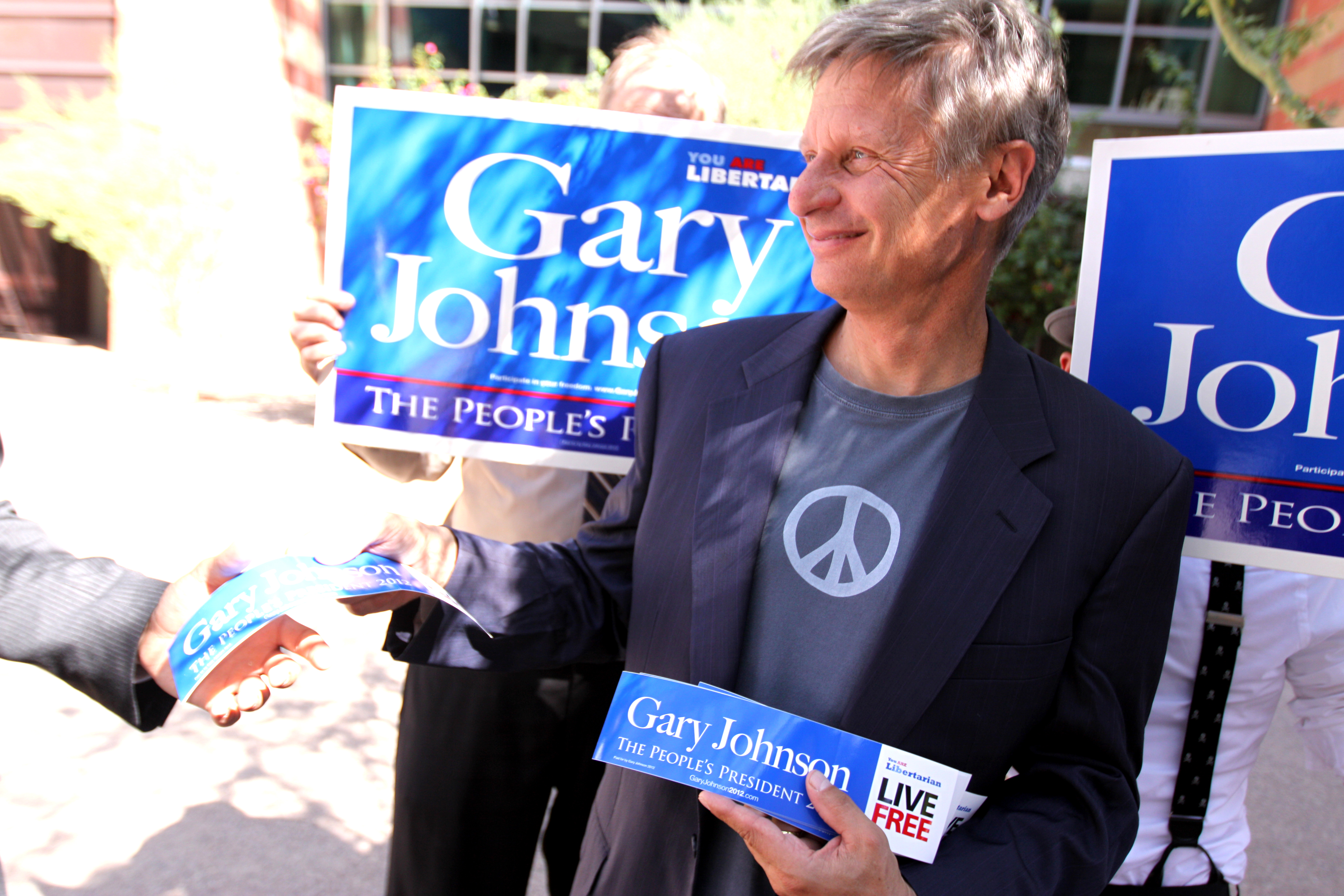
Johnson after a campaign rally in a photo shoot for Reason

In 2009, Johnson began indicating interest in running for president in the 2012 election. In the April 20, 2009, edition of The American Conservative magazine, Bill Kauffman told readers to "keep an eye out" for a Johnson presidential campaign in 2012, reporting that Johnson had told him that "he was keeping his options open for 2012" and that "he may take a shot at the Republican presidential nomination in 2012 as an antiwar, anti-Fed, pro-personal liberties, slash-government-spending candidate – in other words, a Ron Paul libertarian". During a June 24, 2009, appearance on Fox News's Freedom Watch, host Judge Andrew Napolitano asked Johnson if he would run for president in 2012, to which Johnson responded that he thought it would be inappropriate to openly express his desires before President Obama is given the opportunity to prove himself, but he followed up that statement by saying "it appears personal freedoms are being shoveled out the window more and more."

In an October 26, 2009, interview with the Santa Fe New Mexican's Steve Terrell, Johnson announced his decision to form an advocacy committee called the Our America Initiative to help him raise funds and promote small government ideas. In December 2009, Johnson asked strategist Ron Nielson of NSON Opinion Strategy, who has worked with Johnson since 1993 when he ran his successful gubernatorial campaign, to organize the Our American Initiative as a 501(c)(4) committee. Nielson serves as a senior advisor to Our America Initiative. The stated focus of the organization is to "speak out on issues regarding topics such as government efficiency, lowering taxes, ending the war on drugs, protecting civil liberties, revitalizing the economy and promoting entrepreneurship and privatization". The move prompted speculation among media pundits and Johnson's supporters that he might be laying the groundwork for a 2012 presidential run. Throughout 2010, Johnson repeatedly deflected questions about a 2012 presidential bid by saying his 501(c)(4) status prevented him from expressing a desire to run for federal office on politics.

In February 2010, Johnson was a featured speaker at both the Conservative Political Action Conference (CPAC) and the Republican Liberty Caucus. At CPAC, "the crowd liked him – even as he pushed some of his more controversial points." Johnson tied with New Jersey Governor Chris Christie for third in the CPAC Straw Poll, trailing only Ron Paul and Mitt Romney (and ahead of such notables as former Speaker of the House Newt Gingrich, former Minnesota Governor Tim Pawlenty, Indiana Governor Mitch Daniels and former Alaska Governor and 2008 vice presidential candidate Sarah Palin). David Weigel of Slate called Johnson the second-biggest winner of the conference, writing that his "third-place showing in the straw poll gave Johnson his first real media hook ... He met tons of reporters, commanded a small scrum after the vote, and is a slightly lighter shade of dark horse now."

=== Republican presidential candidacy ===
On April 21, 2011, Johnson announced via Twitter, "I am running for president." He followed this announcement with a speech at the New Hampshire State House in Concord, New Hampshire. He was the first of an eventually large field to announce his candidacy for the Republican presidential nomination. Johnson again chose Ron Nielson of NSON Opinion Strategy, a director for both of his New Mexico gubernatorial campaigns, as his presidential campaign manager and senior advisor. The campaign was headquartered in Salt Lake City, Utah, where Nielson's offices are located. Johnson's economics advisor was Harvard economics professor Jeffrey Miron. Initially, Johnson hoped Ron Paul would not run for president so that Johnson could galvanize Paul's network of libertarian-minded voters, and he even traveled to Houston to tell Paul of his decision to run in person, but Paul announced his candidacy on May 13, 2011.

Johnson participated in the first of the Republican presidential debates, hosted by Fox News in South Carolina on May 5, 2011, appearing on stage with Herman Cain, Ron Paul, Tim Pawlenty, and Rick Santorum. Mitt Romney and Michele Bachmann both declined to debate. Johnson was excluded from the next three debates on June 13 (hosted by CNN in New Hampshire), August 11 (hosted by Fox News in Iowa), and September 7 (hosted by CNN in California). After the first exclusion, Johnson made a 43-minute video responding to each of the debate questions, which he posted on YouTube. The first exclusion, which was widely publicized, gave Johnson "a little bump" in name recognition and produced "a small uptick" in donations. But "the long term consequences were dismal." For the financial quarter ending June 30, Johnson raised a mere $180,000. Fox News decided that because Johnson polled at least 2% in five recent polls, he could participate in a September 22 debate in Florida, which it co-hosted with the Florida Republican Party (the party objected to Johnson's inclusion). Johnson participated, appearing on stage with Michele Bachmann, Herman Cain, Newt Gingrich, Jon Huntsman, Ron Paul, Rick Perry, Mitt Romney, and Rick Santorum. During the debate, Johnson delivered what many media outlets, including the Los Angeles Times, and Time, called the best line of the night: "My next-door neighbor's two dogs have created more shovel ready jobs than this administration." Entertainment Weekly opined that Johnson had won the debate.

=== Libertarian presidential nomination and campaign ===
Although Johnson had focused the majority of his campaign activities on the New Hampshire primary, he announced on November 29, 2011, that he would no longer campaign there due to his inability to gain traction with less than a month until the primary. There was speculation in the media that he might run as a Libertarian Party candidate instead. Johnson acknowledged that he was considering such a move. In December, Politico reported that Johnson would quit the Republican primaries and announce his intention to seek the Libertarian Party nomination at a December 28 press conference.

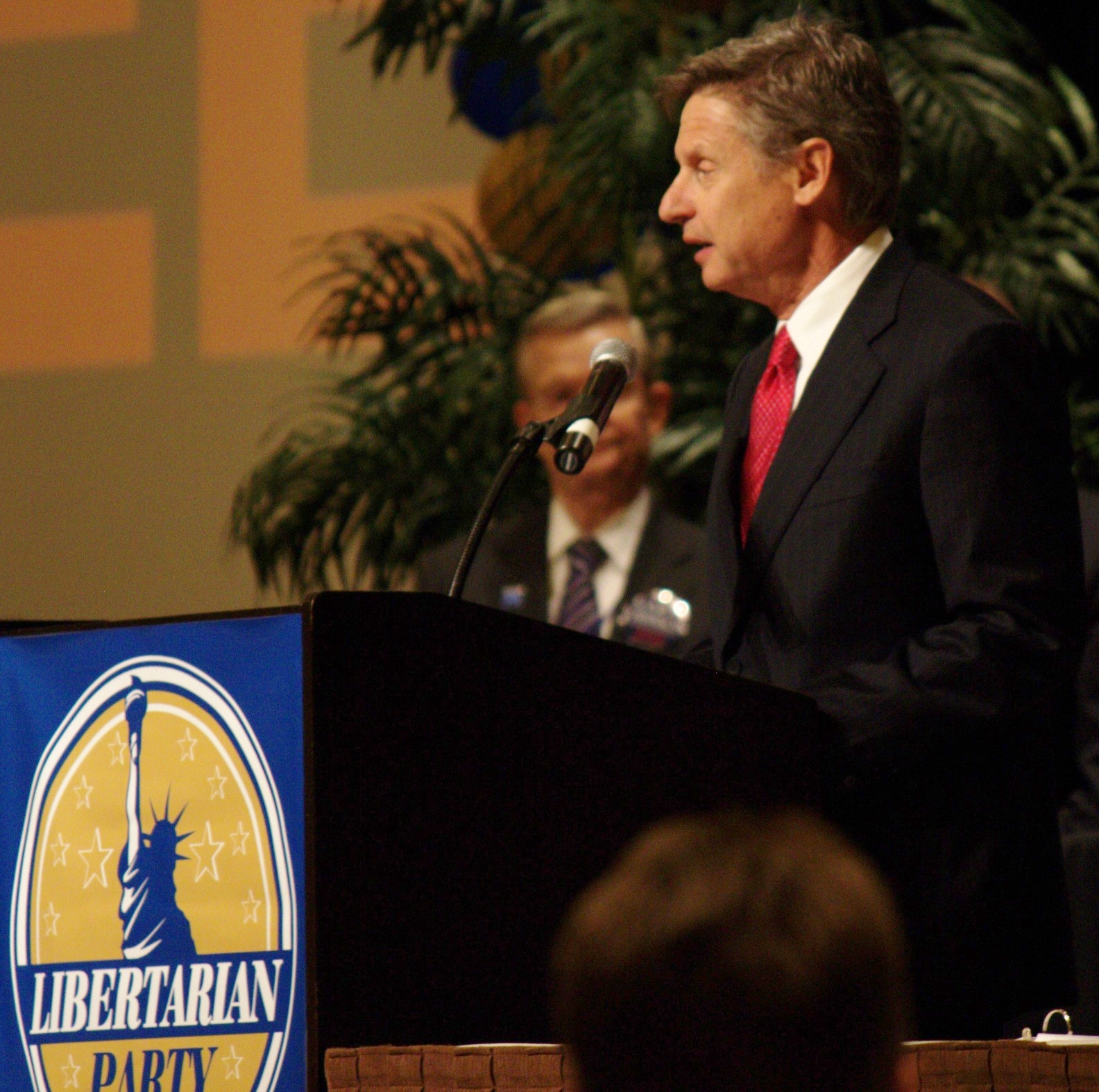
Gary Johnson at the 2012 Libertarian National Convention

On December 28, 2011, Johnson formally withdrew his candidacy for the Republican presidential nomination, and declared his candidacy for the 2012 presidential nomination of the Libertarian Party in Santa Fe, New Mexico. On May 5, 2012, at the 2012 Libertarian National Convention, Johnson received the Libertarian Party's official nomination for president in the 2012 election, by a vote of 419 votes to 152 votes for second-place candidate R. Lee Wrights. In his acceptance speech, Johnson asked the convention's delegates to nominate as his running mate Judge Jim Gray of California. Gray subsequently received the party's vice-presidential nomination on the first ballot.

Johnson spent the early months of his campaign making media appearances on television programs such as The Daily Show with Jon Stewart and Red Eye w/Greg Gutfeld. Starting in September 2012, Johnson embarked on a three-week tour of college campuses throughout the US. On October 23, 2012, Gary Johnson participated in a third-party debate that was aired on C-SPAN, RT America, and Al Jazeera English. A post-debate online election allowed people to choose two candidates from the debate they thought had won to face each other head-to-head in a run-off debate. Gary Johnson and Jill Stein won the poll.

Johnson stated that his goal was to win at least 5 percent of the vote, as winning 5 percent would allow Libertarian Party candidates equal ballot access and federal funding during the next election cycle. In a national Gallup poll of likely registered voters conducted June 7 through June 10, 2012, Johnson took 3% of the vote, while a Gallup poll conducted September 6 through September 9, 2012, showed Johnson taking 1% of likely voters.

The final results showed Johnson received 1% of the popular vote, a total of 1,275,971 votes. This was the best result in the Libertarian Party's history by raw vote number, though under the 1.1 percentage of the vote won by Ed Clark in 1980. Despite falling short of his stated goal of 5%, Johnson stated, "Ours is a mission accomplished." In regards to a future presidential bid, he said "it is too soon to be talking about 2016".

== Inter-presidential campaign activities ==
After the 2012 elections, Johnson continued to criticize the Obama administration on various issues. In an article for The Guardian, Johnson called on United States Attorney General Eric Holder to let individual states legalize marijuana. In a Google Hangout hosted by Johnson in June 2013, he criticized the US government's lack of transparency and due process in regards to the NSA's domestic surveillance programs. He also said that he would not rule out running as a Republican again in the future.

=== Our America Initiative PAC ===
In December 2013, Johnson announced the founding of his own Super PAC, Our America Initiative PAC. The Super PAC is intended to support libertarian-minded causes. "From the realities of government-run healthcare setting in to the continuing disclosures of the breadth of NSA's domestic spying, more Americans than ever are ready to take a serious look at candidates who offer real alternatives to business-as-usual," the release announcing the PAC said.

=== CEO of Cannabis Sativa Inc. ===
In July 2014, Johnson was named president and CEO of Cannabis Sativa Inc., a Nevada-based company that aims primarily to sell medical cannabis products in states where medicinal and/or recreational cannabis is legal.

=== Libertarians for National Popular Vote ===
In 2020, Johnson joined the Libertarians for National Popular Vote's advisory board.

== 2016 presidential campaign ==
In an April 2014 "Ask Me Anything" session on Reddit, Johnson stated that he hoped to run for president again in 2016. On whether he would run as a Libertarian or a Republican, he stated: "I would love running as a Libertarian because I would have the least amount of explaining to do."

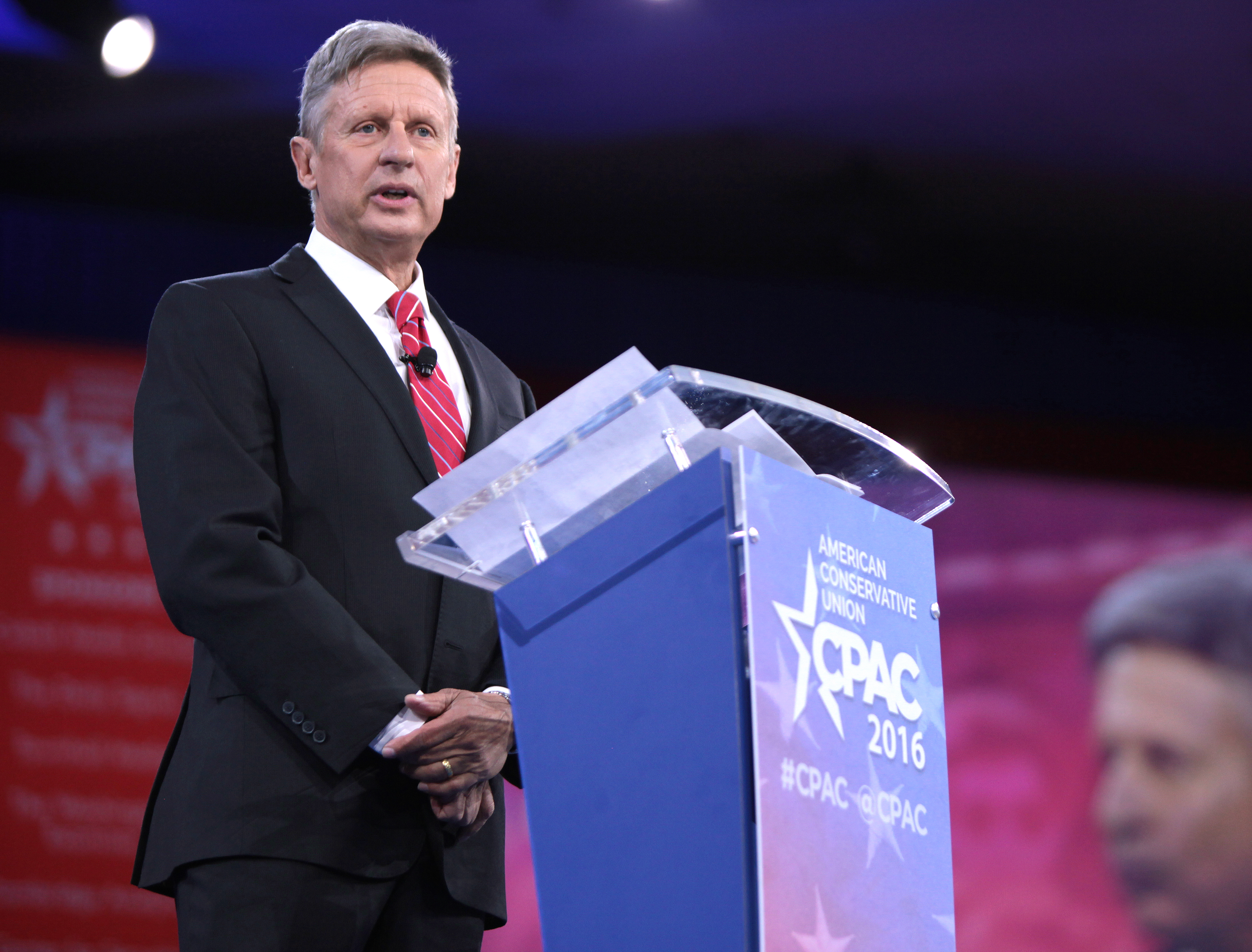
Gary Johnson speaking at the 2016 Conservative Political Action Conference (CPAC) in Washington, D.C.

In November 2014, Johnson affirmed his intention to run for the 2016 Libertarian nomination. In July 2015, Johnson reiterated his intentions for a presidential campaign but stated he was not announcing anything imminently: "I just think there are more downsides than upsides to announcing at this point, and, look, I don't have any delusions about the process. In retrospect, 90 percent of the time I spent [trying to become president] ended up to be wasted time."

In January 2016, Johnson resigned from his post as CEO of Cannabis Sativa, Inc., to pursue political opportunities, hinting to a 2016 presidential run.

On January 6, 2016, Johnson declared that he would seek the Libertarian nomination for the presidency. On May 18, Johnson named former Massachusetts Governor William Weld as his running mate. The 2016 Libertarian National Convention was held in May later that year, with Johnson among the candidates seeking the nomination. The third day of the convention featured a debate among the candidates. When each of the candidates was asked if he would support mandating driver's licenses, Johnson was the sole candidate to answer affirmitavely. When he began responding that he believed drivers should "show some competency", he was promptly booed. Nonetheless, on May 29, 2016, Johnson received the Libertarian nomination on the second ballot. Johnson was on the ballot in all 50 states.

On September 8, Johnson appeared on MSNBC's Morning Joe and was asked by panelist Mike Barnicle, "As president, what would you do about Aleppo?" Johnson responded, "and what is Aleppo?" After a clarification from Barnicle, Johnson answered by saying that "the only way that we deal with Syria is to join hands with Russia to diplomatically bring that at an end." Johnson criticized U.S. support for the Free Syrian Army and Kurdish forces and stated that the "mess" in Syria was "the result of regime change that we end up supporting. And, inevitably, these regime changes have led to a less-safe world." Johnson's "what is Aleppo?" question drew widespread attention, much of it negative. In response to charges that he was uninformed, Johnson said that he had "blanked", that he did "understand the dynamics of the Syrian conflict", and that he had thought that Barnicle's reference to "Aleppo" was in relation to "an acronym, not the Syrian conflict".

On September 23, in an MSNBC interview with Kasie Hunt, Gary Johnson noted the benefits of being invited to the 2016 Presidential Debates. While discussing this topic, Johnson stuck out his tongue through his teeth at the reporter while explaining that he could win a three-way debate, and ultimately the Presidency, versus Clinton and Trump while speaking in that manner. Johnson's spokesperson, John LaBeaume, later stated, "He was just having fun" and that it was "lighthearted".

On September 28, in a MSNBC Town Hall, Johnson was asked by Chris Matthews to name a world leader he respected. He tried to name Vicente Fox, a former President of Mexico but could not remember his name. The following day, he tweeted, "It's been almost 24 hours...and I still can't come up with a foreign leader I look up to." Later in a CNN interview, he expanded upon his reluctance to endorse political leaders, "I held a lot of people in this country on pedestals and then I get to meet them up front and personal and I find out that they're all about getting reelected, that they're not about issues, a lot of empty suits that I held up on pedestals."

When asked on October 5 by The New York Times if he knew the name of the leader of North Korea, Johnson said "yes", but declined to give the name despite being pressed.

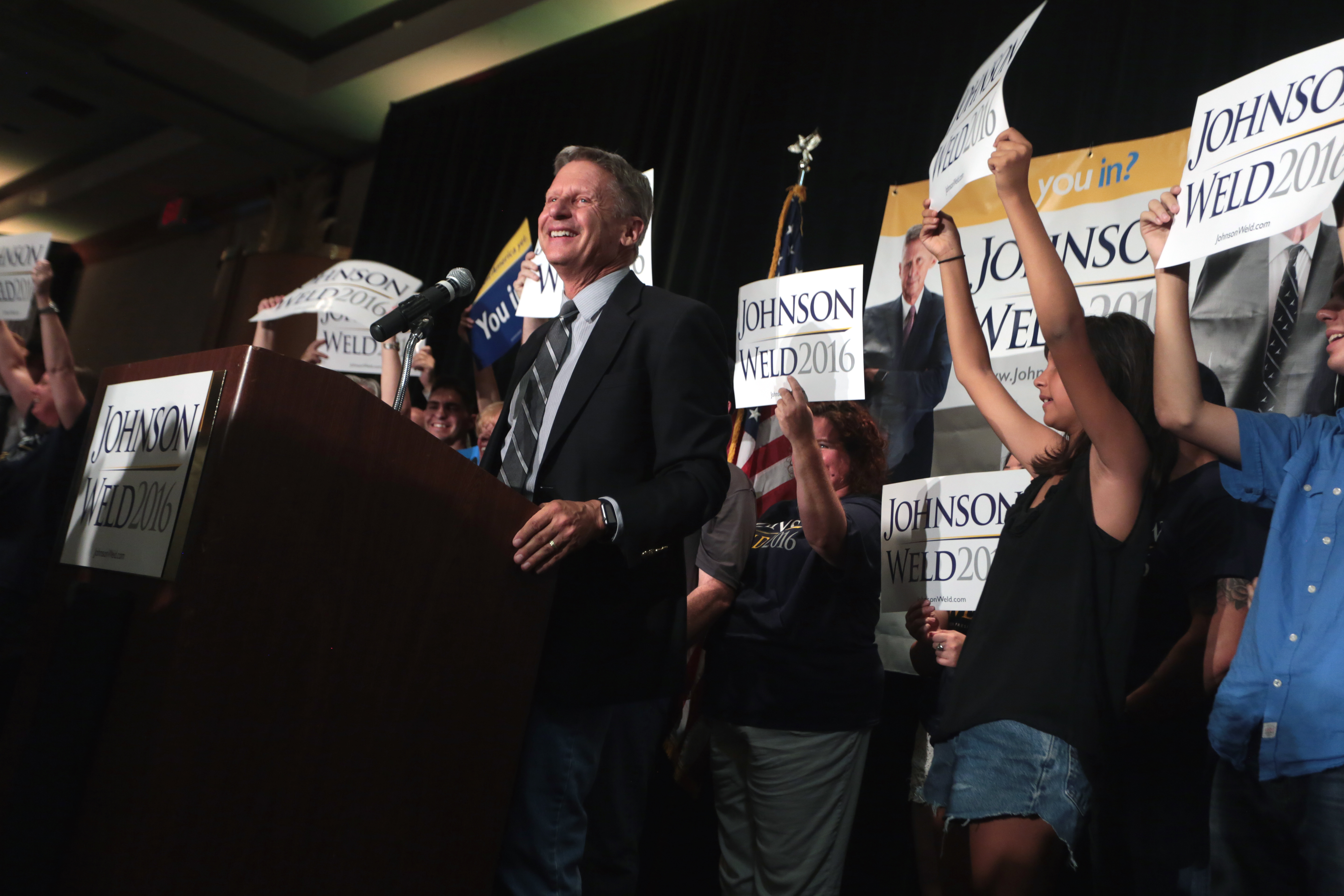
Johnson speaking at an October 2016 rally in Phoenix, Arizona

Johnson was not invited to participate in the presidential debates because he did not meet the criterion of 15% support in five polls set by the Commission on Presidential Debates. In 2015, Johnson and Green Party nominee Jill Stein filed a lawsuit against the commission, arguing that the commission and its rules violated antitrust law and the First Amendment. In August 2016, the lawsuit was dismissed. Johnson's poll numbers had been averaging between 7 and 9 percent. Johnson's campaign manager Ron Nielson argued for Johnson's inclusion, citing Ross Perot's admission to the debates in the 1992 debates, when Perot was polling at 8 percent.

A Washington Post-SurveyMonkey 50-state poll, conducted online between August 9 and September 1 found Gary Johnson polling at 10% or higher in 42 states, and at 15% or higher in 15 states (Johnson received 25% in his home state of New Mexico and 23% in Utah). Another poll conducted in mid-August by the Pew Research Center found Johnson supported by about 10% of registered voters. Of Johnson supporters, more than 60% identified as independent and more than 70% were younger than fifty years old. Johnson's supporters were evenly divided between men and women.

After the election, Johnson stated in an interview with the Albuquerque Journal that he does not intend to run for public office again, saying, "Maybe I stay politically active, but not as a candidate. I will leave that to others." He subsequently confirmed that he would not seek the Libertarian Party's nomination in 2020.

== 2018 U.S. Senate race ==
Johnson was speculated to run in the 2018 U.S. Senate race in New Mexico after Land Commissioner Aubrey Dunn Jr., then the Libertarian nominee, dropped out of the race. In August 2018, Johnson formally accepted the Libertarian Party of New Mexico's nomination. Republican U.S. Senator Rand Paul of Kentucky crossed party lines to endorse Johnson's bid; Johnson was also endorsed by the Republican nominee for the U.S. Senate in Maine, Eric Brakey.

In the November 2018 election, Democratic incumbent Martin Heinrich was reelected with 376,998 votes (54%); Republican nominee Mick Rich received 212,813 votes (31%); and Johnson received 107,201 votes (15%).

== Political positions ==
Johnson's views have been described as fiscally conservative and socially liberal with a philosophy of limited government and military non-interventionism. Johnson spoke at the 2016 Conservative Political Action Conference (CPAC), a forum for conservative politicians. He has identified as a classical liberal. He would repeal Obamacare. Johnson has said he favors simplifying and reducing taxes. During his governorship, Johnson cut taxes fourteen times and never increased them. Due to his stance on taxes, political pundit David Weigel described him as "the original Tea Party candidate". Johnson has advocated the FairTax as a template for tax reform. This proposal would abolish all federal income, corporate and capital gains taxes, and replace them with a 23% tax on consumption of all non-essential goods, while providing a regressive rebate to households according to household size, regardless of income level. He has argued that this would ensure transparency in the tax system and incentivize the private sector to create "tens of millions of jobs". In June 2016, Johnson said that he supported the Trans-Pacific Partnership, stating that he previously was skeptical "because these trade agreements are just laden with crony capitalism", but is now informed it, in fact, fosters free trade.

=== Death penalty ===
In 1994, Johnson ran for governor of New Mexico, campaigning as a strong proponent of the death penalty, but over time, he changed his opinion. He now supports abolishing capital punishment and replacing it with life sentences. In 2001, Johnson refused to grant clemency to convicted child rapist and murderer Terry D. Clark, who became the only person to be executed in the modern era in New Mexico. At the time, Johnson expressed concern over capital punishment, but said there were no doubts about the guilt of Clark, who had pleaded guilty and waived his remaining appeals.

=== Environmental ===
Johnson's 2016 campaign website acknowledged that the climate is "probably" changing and that humans are "probably" contributing to this change. Johnson has argued that climate change will not matter in the "long-term" and rejects government action to control or limit – including cap and trade – as ineffective: "When you look at the amount of money we are looking to spend on global warming – in the trillions – and look at the result, I just argue that the result is completely inconsequential to the money we would end up spending," he said. "We can direct those moneys to other ways that would be much more beneficial to mankind." Johnson has signed the Western Governors' Association resolution, which aims at "collaborative, incentive driven, locally-based solutions", and has advocated for free market solutions to environmental problems. He has stated that he will not "compromise when it comes to clean air, clean land, or clean water". Johnson supports nuclear energy and fossil fuels, but has stated that the government has a role to protect Americans against businesses that would harm human health or property, including environmental harm.

=== Campaign finance ===
Johnson opposed the U.S. Supreme Court decision in Citizens United v. FEC, allowing unlimited corporate independent expenditures on political campaigns, while also encouraging full disclosure of such expenditures.

=== Fiscal ===
Johnson has said that he would immediately balance the federal budget, and would demand a balanced budget amendment, but maintained a state deficit. He has advocated passing a law allowing for state bankruptcy and expressly ruling out a federal bailout of any states.

=== Healthcare ===
He has stated he supports "slashing government spending", including Medicare, Medicaid, and Social Security, which would involve cutting Medicare and Medicaid by 43 percent and turning them into block grant programs, with control of spending in the hands of the states to create, in his words, "fifty laboratories of innovation". He has referred to Social Security as a pyramid scheme.

=== Federal Reserve ===
Johnson has expressed opposition to the Federal Reserve System, which he has cited as massively devaluing the strength of the U.S. dollar, and would not veto legislation to eliminate it – although he has stated that no such bill is likely to come out of Congress during his administration. He has also supported an audit of the central bank, and urged Members of Congress in July 2012 to vote in favor of Ron Paul's Federal Reserve Transparency Act.

=== Foreign policy ===
In his campaign for the Libertarian Party nomination, he stated he opposed foreign wars and pledged to cut the military budget by 43 percent in his first term as president. He would cut the military's overseas bases, uniformed and civilian personnel, research and development, intelligence, and nuclear weapons programs, while maintaining an "invincible defense". Johnson opposed U.S. involvement in the War in Afghanistan and opposed the U.S. involvement in the Libyan Civil War. He has stated that he does not believe Iran is a military threat, would use his presidential power to prevent Israel from attacking Iran, and would not follow Israel, or any other ally, into a war that it had initiated. While Johnson views the Islamic threat to the US as overrated, he has been openly advocating for greater diplomacy with China regarding North Korea, which, in his view, "is the biggest threat in the world today", stating "...one of these days, one of their ICBMs is going to work." However, he does support waging war for humanitarian reasons.

=== Civil liberties ===
Johnson has been a strong supporter of civil liberties and has received the highest score of any candidate from the American Civil Liberties Union for supporting drug decriminalization while opposing censorship and regulation of the Internet, the Patriot Act, enhanced airport screenings, and the indefinite detention of prisoners. He has spoken in favor of the separation of church and state, and has said that he does not "seek the counsel of God" when determining his political agenda. Johnson endorsed same-sex marriage in 2011; he has since called for a constitutional amendment protecting equal marriage rights, and criticized Obama's position on the issue as having "thrown this question back to the states". Johnson supports the enforcement of Protected Classes that was established by the Civil Rights Act of 1964, and believes that providers should be prohibited from discriminating between customers based on demographics, such as race or sexuality. This differentiated him from his Libertarian Party opponents in the party primary, especially Austin Petersen. He has been a longtime advocate of legalizing marijuana and has said that if he were president, he would remove it from Schedule I of the Controlled Substances Act as well as issue an executive order pardoning nonviolent marijuana offenders. Johnson has stated that he would pardon NSA whistleblower Edward Snowden. He believes that decriminalizing sex work should be left up to the states, but has said that prostitutes are more "at risk" in an illegal environment.

=== Abortion ===
Johnson supports abortion access. He has stated he believes that "it's the woman's choice." His 2016 position page on abortion states the "woman must be allowed to make decisions about her own health" and "government should not be in the business of second guessing".

=== Immigration ===
Johnson supports comprehensive immigration reform and has criticized the immigration stances of Obama, Trump, and Hillary Clinton. In his 2012 campaign, he summed up his proposals as simplifying legal immigration while tackling illegal immigration. Johnson proposes "eliminating categories and quotas" and offering illegal immigrants without criminal records in the U.S. a path to legal status. In 2012, he called walls ineffective in stopping illegal immigrants and argued that the U.S. should instead work on tackling Mexican drug cartels by decriminalizing marijuana and giving cartels "diminished incentives to violate U.S. law". Johnson believes the root of illegal immigration is what he calls America's complicated immigration policies and has said the U.S. should "recognize the real problem – a flawed system – and fix it". "Even for those from the right countries or with the right skills, our bureaucracy makes it ridiculously slow and cumbersome to come here legally", he has said. Johnson advocates simplifying restrictions on temporary work visas, granting illegal immigrants who obey the law a two-year grace period to obtain work visas and streamlining the immigration process. He has also said, "a work visa should include a background check and a Social Security card so that taxes get paid" and supports a one strike, you're out deportation rule for immigrants who try to circumnavigate or cheat a simplified immigration process.

=== Gun laws ===
Johnson opposes federal and state gun control legislation, saying: "I'm a firm believer in the Second Amendment and so I would not have signed legislation banning assault weapons or automatic weapons." Johnson says that the Second Amendment "was designed to protect us against a government that could be very intrusive. And in this country, we have a growing police state – if people can own assault rifles or automatic rifles, I think leads to a more civil government." Johnson would, however, limit weapons such as rocket launchers. Johnson believes that allowing concealed carrying of guns reduces crime and gun violence. He opposes barring gun sales to individuals on the no-fly list, because he claims that such lists have a high error rate. Johnson has called for a "thousand-person taskforce" or "hot line" to prevent terrorists from obtaining guns, and has questioned why the perpetrator of the Orlando nightclub shooting was not "deprived of his guns" after being interviewed three times.

== Personal life ==
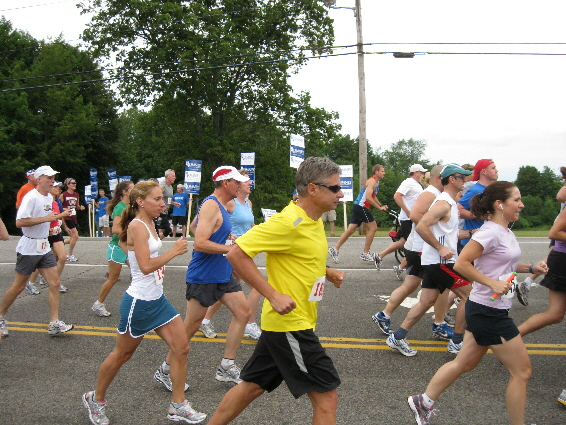
Johnson running the 38th Annual Stratham Fair Road Race

Johnson was married to his college girlfriend, Dee Johnson (née Simms; 1952–2006) from 1977 to 2005. As First Lady of New Mexico, she engaged in campaigns against smoking and for breast cancer awareness and oversaw the expansion of the Governor's Mansion. He initiated a separation in May 2005, and four months later announced that they would divorce. At the age of 54, Dee Johnson died unexpectedly on December 22, 2006, her cause of death later attributed to hypertensive heart disease. The couple had two children, now adults. He also has a granddaughter, Cora, through his son Erik.

Johnson was an avid triathlete who biked extensively. During his term in office, he competed in several triathlons, marathons and bike races. He competed three times (1993, 1997, 1999) as a celebrity invitee at the Ironman World Championship in Hawaii, registering his best time for the 2.4-mile (3.9 km) swim, 112-mile (180 km) bike ride, and 26.2-mile (42.2 km) marathon run in 1999 with 10 hours, 39 minutes, and 16 seconds. He once ran 100 miles (160 km) in 30 consecutive hours in the Rocky Mountains. On May 30, 2003, he reached the summit of Mount Everest "despite toes blackened with frostbite". He has climbed all of the Seven Summits: Mount Everest, Mount Elbrus, Denali, Mount Kilimanjaro, Aconcagua, Mount Vinson, and Carstensz Pyramid – the tallest peaks in Asia, Europe, North America, Africa, South America, Antarctica, and Australia respectively. He completed the Bataan Memorial Death March at White Sands Missile Range in New Mexico, in which participants traverse a 26.2 mi (42.2 km) course through the desert, many of them in combat boots and wearing 35-pound (16 kg) packs.

On October 12, 2005, Johnson was involved in a near-fatal paragliding accident when his wing caught in a tree and he fell approximately 50 feet (15 m) to the ground. He suffered multiple bone fractures, including a burst fracture to his twelfth thoracic vertebra, a broken rib, and a broken knee; the accident left him 1 1/2 inches (3.8 cm) shorter. He used medicinal marijuana for pain control from 2005 to 2008.

Johnson is a Lutheran and has said that his belief in God has given him "a very fundamental belief that we should do unto others as we would have others do unto us".

Johnson has celiac disease and maintains a gluten-free diet. He has homes in Santa Fe and Taos, New Mexico.

== Electoral history ==
1994 New Mexico gubernatorial election
Party	Candidate	Votes	%	±%
Republican	Gary Johnson	232,945	49.8%	+4.7%
Democratic	Bruce King (inc.)	186,686	39.9%	−14.7%
Green	Roberto Mondragón	47,990	10.3%	
Majority		46,259	9.9%	+0.4%
Turnout		467,621		
Republican gain from Democratic		Swing		

1998 New Mexico gubernatorial election
Party	Candidate	Votes	%	±%
Republican	Gary Johnson (inc.)	271,948	54.5%	+4.7%
Democratic	Martin Chávez	226,755	45.5%	+5.6%
Majority		45,193	9.1%	−0.8%
Turnout		498,703		
Republican hold		Swing		

2012 United States presidential election Election on November 6, 2012
Party	Candidate	Votes	%	±%
Democratic	Barack Obama (inc.)	65,915,795	51.2%	−1.8%
Republican	Mitt Romney	60,933,504	47.3%	+1.6%
Libertarian	Gary Johnson	1,275,971	1.0%	+0.6%
Green	Jill Stein	469,627	0.4%	+0.2%
Constitution	Virgil Goode	121,616	0.1%	−0.1%
Others	Others	434,247	0.3%	−0.5%
Majority		(1,333,513)	(1.0%)	
Turnout		129,132,140	57.5%	
Democratic hold		Swing		

2016 United States presidential election Election on November 8, 2016
Party	Candidate	Votes	%	±%
Republican	Donald Trump	62,984,828	46.1%	−1.1%
Democratic	Hillary Clinton	65,853,514	48.2%	−3.0%
Libertarian	Gary Johnson	4,489,235	3.3%	+2.3%
Green	Jill Stein	1,457,226	1.1%	+0.7%
Constitution	Darrell Castle	203,069	0.1%	0%
Others	Others	984,722	0.7%	+0.4%
Republican gain from Democratic		Swing		

2018 United States Senate election in New Mexico
Party	Candidate	Votes	%	±%
Democratic	Martin Heinrich (inc.)	373,799	54.0%	
Republican	Mick Rich	211,301	30.6%	
Libertarian	Gary Johnson	106,524	15.4%	

== Books ==
- Seven Principles of Good Government: Gary Johnson on liberty, people and politics. 2012. Aberdeen, WA: Silver Lake Publishing. ISBN 978-1563439131. OCLC 809701081
- Common Sense for the Common Good; Libertarianism as the End of Two-Party Tyranny was published as an e-book on September 27, 2016. Johnson describes the book as an examination of "the root causes that have brought the two-party system to crisis."
- How Liberty Can Change the World was published by Broadside on June 13, 2017.

Party political offices
Preceded by Frank Bond	Republican nominee for Governor of New Mexico; 1994, 1998	Succeeded by John Sanchez
Preceded by Bob Barr	Libertarian nominee for President of the United States; 2012, 2016	Succeeded by Jo Jorgensen
Preceded by Aubrey Dunn Jr. Withdrew	Libertarian nominee for U.S. Senator from New Mexico (Class 1); 2018	Most recent
Political offices
Preceded by Bruce King	Governor of New Mexico; 1995–2003	Succeeded by Bill Richardson
U.S. order of precedence (ceremonial)
Preceded by Garrey Carruthers as Former Governor	Order of precedence of the United States	Succeeded by Susana Martinez as Former Governor
