= 2018 United States Senate election in New Mexico =

- November 6, 2018
- Turnout: 55.0%
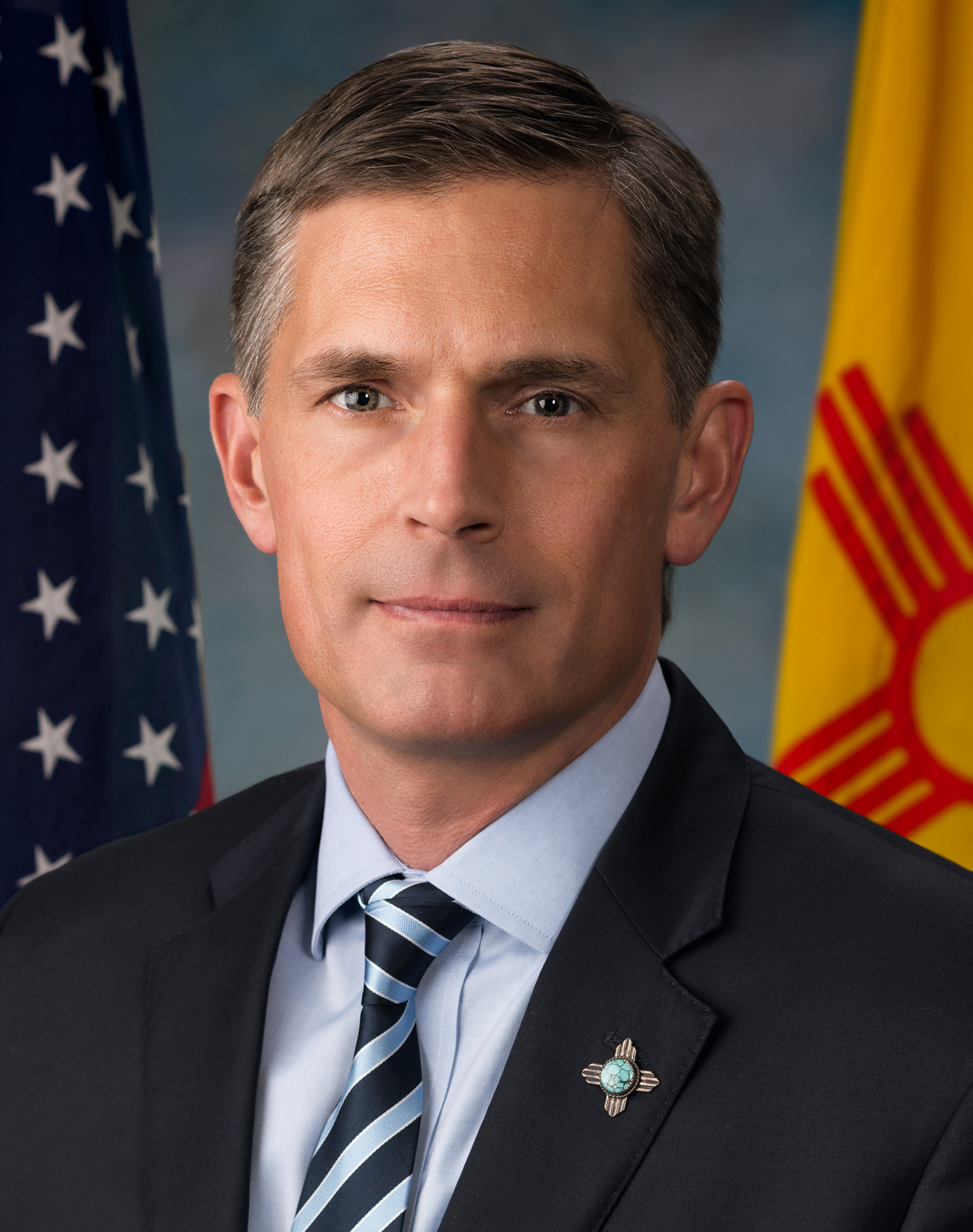

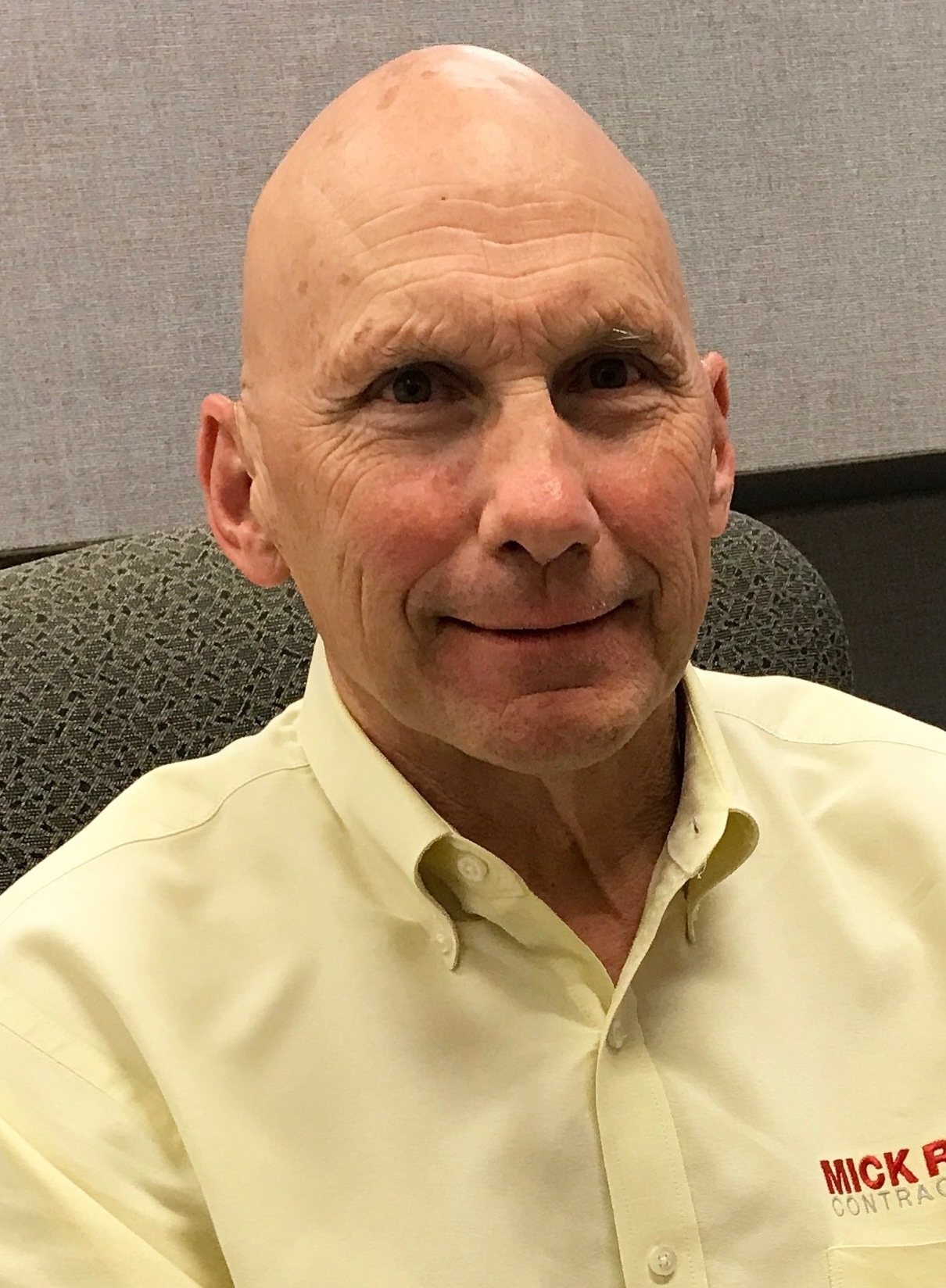

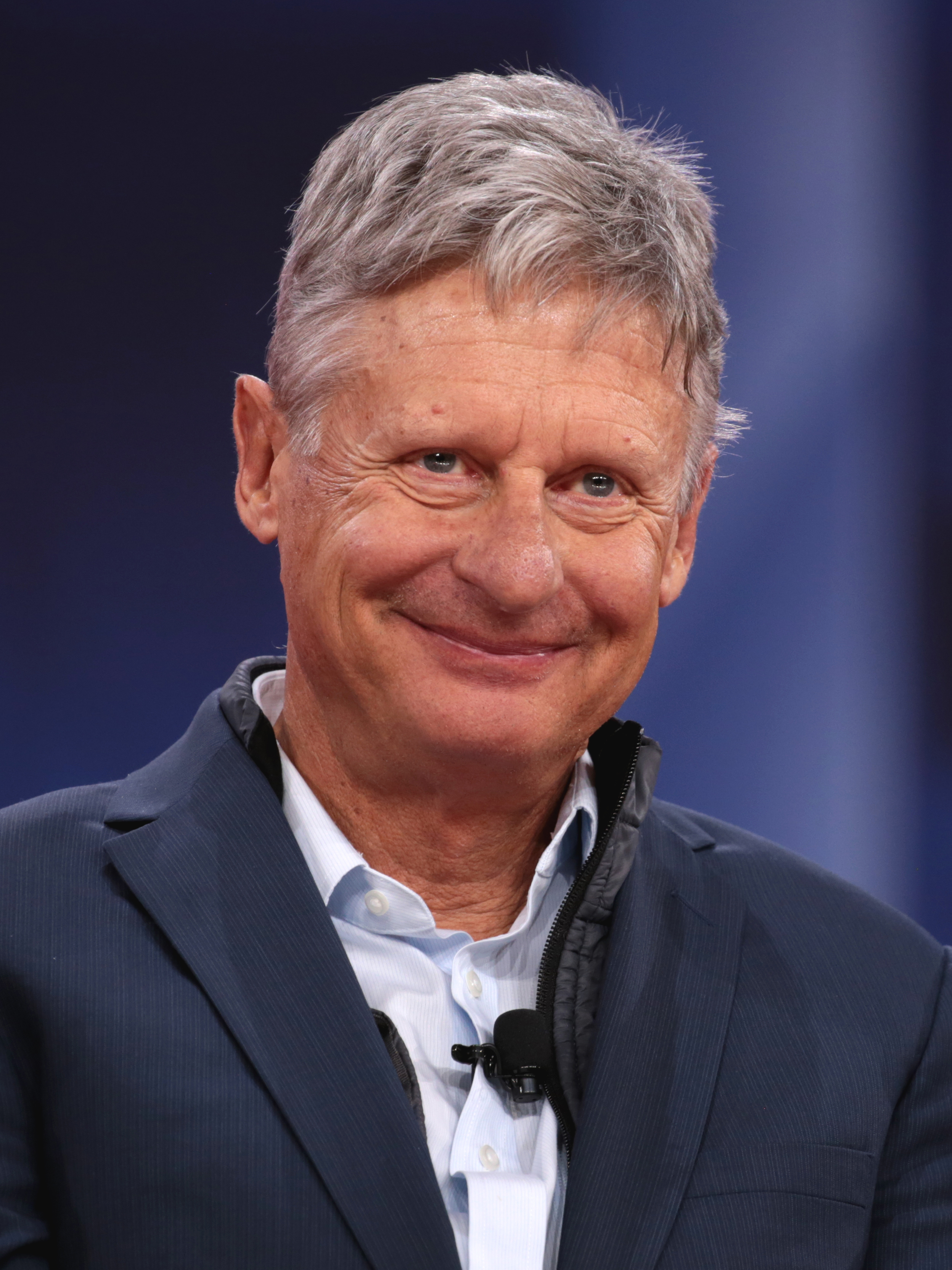
| Nominee | Martin Heinrich | Mick Rich | Gary Johnson |
| Party | Democratic | Republican | Libertarian |
| Popular vote | 376,998 | 212,813 | 107,201 |
| Percentage | 54.09% | 30.53% | 15.38% |
- Heinrich: 30–40% 40–50% 50–60% 60–70% 70–80% 80–90% >90% Rich: 30–40% 40–50% 50–60% 60–70% 70–80% 80–90% >90% Tie: 40–50% No data
U.S. senator before election
Martin Heinrich
Democratic
Elected U.S. Senator
Martin Heinrich
Democratic

The 2018 United States Senate election in New Mexico took place on November 6, 2018, to elect a member of the United States Senate to represent the state of New Mexico, concurrently with other elections to the United States Senate, elections to the United States House of Representatives, and various state and local elections.

Incumbent Democratic Senator Martin Heinrich won re-election to a second term. His opponents were Republican nominee and businessman Mick Rich and Libertarian nominee Gary Johnson, a two-term Republican governor of New Mexico and two-time candidate for president of the United States.

The candidate filing deadline was March 13, 2018. The Republican and Democratic primary elections were held June 5, 2018. Johnson's results were the highest results for a Libertarian candidate in New Mexico history.

== Democratic primary ==
=== Candidates ===
==== Nominee ====
- Martin Heinrich, incumbent U.S. senator

=== Results ===
Democratic primary results
| Party | Candidate | Votes | % |
|---|---|---|---|
| Democratic | Martin Heinrich (incumbent) | 152,145 | 100% |
| Total votes | | 152,145 | 100% |

== Republican primary ==
=== Candidates ===
==== Nominee ====
- Mick Rich, businessman

==== Declined ====
- Aubrey Dunn Jr., New Mexico Commissioner of Public Lands and candidate for NM-02 in 2008 (ran as a Libertarian, later endorsed Gary Johnson)
- Steve Pearce, U.S. representative, candidate for the U.S. Senate in 2000 and nominee for the U.S. Senate in 2008 (ran for Governor)
- Susana Martinez, governor of New Mexico

=== Results ===
Republican primary results
| Party | Candidate | Votes | % |
|---|---|---|---|
| Republican | Mick Rich | 67,502 | 100% |
| Total votes | | 67,502 | 100% |

== Libertarian primary ==
On July 30, 2018, nominee Aubrey Dunn withdrew from the race. On August 4, former governor Gary Johnson was formally nominated by the Libertarian Party of New Mexico as Dunn's replacement. Johnson accepted his party's nomination on August 13.

=== Candidates ===
==== Declared ====
- Gary Johnson, former governor of New Mexico, Libertarian nominee for president in 2012 and 2016

==== Withdrew nomination ====
- Aubrey Dunn Jr., New Mexico Commissioner of Public Lands

=== Results ===
Libertarian primary results
| Party | Candidate | Votes | % |
|---|---|---|---|
| Libertarian | Aubrey Dunn | 623 | 100% |
| Total votes | | 623 | 100% |

== General election ==
=== Debates ===
- Complete video of debate, October 12, 2018

=== Endorsements ===
Martin Heinrich (D)

U.S. senators

- Angus King, U.S. senator (I-ME)

Organizations

- Alliance for Retired Americans
- End Citizens United
- J Street
- League of Conservation Voters
- Natural Resources Defense Council
- Population Connection
- Sierra Club
- Southwest Regional Council of Carpenters
- United Automobile Workers
Mick Rich (R)

Governors

- Susana Martinez, governor of New Mexico, former chair of the Republican Governors Association

U.S. representatives

- Steve Pearce (NM-02)

Individuals

- Steve Bannon, former White House Chief Strategist and executive chair of Breitbart News

Organizations

- Associated Builders and Contractors
- National Association of Wholesaler-Distributors
- National Right to Life Committee
Gary Johnson (L)

Governors

- Bill Weld, former governor of Massachusetts and 2016 Libertarian nominee for vice president

U.S. senators

- Rand Paul, Republican U.S. Senator from Kentucky

Statewide officials

- Aubrey Dunn Jr., New Mexico Commissioner of Public Lands, former Libertarian Senate candidate

State representatives

- Tweeti Blancett, former Republican state representative
- Robert Perls, former Democratic state representative

Local officeholders

- Eric Brakey, State Senator and Republican U.S. Senate candidate from Maine
- Jim Gray, former presiding judge of the Orange County Superior Court in California and 2012 Libertarian nominee for vice president
- Mark Tippetts, former member of the city council of Lago Vista, Texas, and 2018 Libertarian nominee for governor of Texas

Journalists

- Nick Gillespie, editor-at-large of Reason magazine

Newspapers

- Orange County Register

Organizations

- Libertarian Youth Caucus
- New Mexico Open Primaries

=== Predictions ===
| Source | Ranking | As of |
|---|---|---|
| The Cook Political Report | Safe D | October 26, 2018 |
| Inside Elections | Safe D | November 1, 2018 |
| Sabato's Crystal Ball | Safe D | November 1, 2018 |
| Fox News | Likely D | November 1, 2018 |
| CNN | Safe D | November 1, 2018 |
| RealClearPolitics | Safe D | November 5, 2018 |
| FiveThirtyEight | Safe D | November 6, 2018 |

^Highest rating given

=== Polling ===
==== Graphical summary ====
View source data.

==== Polls ====
| Poll source | Date(s) administered | Sample size | Margin of error | Martin Heinrich (D) | Mick Rich (R) | Gary Johnson (L) | Undecided |
|---|---|---|---|---|---|---|---|
| Research Co. | November 1–3, 2018 | 450 | ± 4.6% | 47% | 33% | 11% | 9% |
| Carroll Strategies | November 1, 2018 | 1,202 | ± 2.8% | 51% | 38% | 8% | 3% |
| Research & Polling, Inc. | October 26 – November 1, 2018 | 993 | ± 3.1% | 51% | 31% | 12% | 6% |
| Emerson College | October 24–26, 2018 | 936 | ± 3.4% | 48% | 32% | 16% | 5% |
| Pacific Market Research | October 19–24, 2018 | 400 | ± 4.9% | 40% | 28% | 22% | 11% |
| NSON Opinion Strategy (L) | September 20–24, 2018 | 932 | – | 36% | 10% | 28% | 26% |
| In Lux Research (L-Elect Liberty PAC) | September 16–17, 2018 | 900 | – | 38% | 10% | 28% | 24% |
| Research & Polling, Inc. | September 7–13, 2018 | 966 | ± 3.1% | 47% | 26% | 16% | – |
| In Lux Research (L-Elect Liberty PAC) | August 2018 | 900 | – | 38% | 13% | 28% | 21% |
| Emerson College | August 17–18, 2018 | 500 | ± 4.6% | 39% | 11% | 21% | 30% |
| GQR Research (D-TMI) | August 2–5, 2018 | 500 | ± 4.4% | 48% | 33% | 17% | 2% |
| GBA Strategies (D-Heinrich) | August 1–5, 2018 | 800 | ± 3.5% | 47% | 29% | 22% | – |
| The Tarrance Group (R-Rich) | July 31 – August 2, 2018 | 500 | ± 4.5% | 44% | 30% | 20% | 6% |
| NSON Opinion Strategy (L) | July 2018 | 500 | – | 39% | 25% | 23% | 12% |

Hypothetical polling

with Mick Rich

| Poll source | Date(s) administered | Sample size | Margin of error | Martin Heinrich (D) | Mick Rich (R) | Undecided |
|---|---|---|---|---|---|---|
| The Tarrance Group (R-Rich) | July 31 – August 2, 2018 | 500 | ± 4.5% | 55% | 37% | 8% |
| NSON Opinion Strategy (L) | July 2018 | 500 | – | 47% | 29% | – |

with Gary Johnson

| Poll source | Date(s) administered | Sample size | Margin of error | Martin Heinrich (D) | Gary Johnson (L) | Undecided |
|---|---|---|---|---|---|---|
| GBA Strategies (D-Heinrich) | August 1–5, 2018 | 800 | ± 3.5% | 50% | 38% | – |
| In Lux Research (L) | July 28–29, 2018 | 525 | – | 40% | 42% | – |

with Aubrey Dunn

| Poll source | Date(s) administered | Sample size | Margin of error | Martin Heinrich (D) | Mick Rich (R) | Aubrey Dunn (L) | Undecided |
|---|---|---|---|---|---|---|---|
| NSON Opinion Strategy (L) | July 2018 | 500 | – | 47% | 30% | 7% | 16% |
| Carroll Strategies | June 15–16, 2018 | 1,199 | ± 2.8% | 50% | 39% | 5% | 6% |

=== Results ===
2018 United States Senate election in New Mexico
| Party | Candidate | Votes | % | ±% |
|---|---|---|---|---|
| Democratic | Martin Heinrich (incumbent) | 376,998 | 54.09% | +3.08% |
| Republican | Mick Rich | 212,813 | 30.53% | −14.75% |
| Libertarian | Gary Johnson | 107,201 | 15.38% | N/A |
| Total votes | | 697,012 | 100.00% | N/A |
| Democratic hold | | | | |

==== By county ====
| County | Martin Heinrich Democratic | | Mick Rich Republican | | Gary Johnson Libertarian | | Margin | | Total |
| County | # | % | # | % | # | % | # | % | Total |
|---|---|---|---|---|---|---|---|---|---|
| Bernalillo | 140,082 | 58.1% | 61,932 | 25.7% | 39,274 | 16.3% | 78,150 | 32.4% | 241,288 |
| Catron | 550 | 26.9% | 1,075 | 58.4% | 217 | 11.8% | -525 | -31.5% | 1,842 |
| Chaves | 5,279 | 31.7% | 8,727 | 52.4% | 2,666 | 16.0% | -3,448 | -20.7% | 16,672 |
| Cibola | 3,924 | 55.1% | 1,842 | 25.9% | 1,355 | 19.0% | 2,082 | 29.2% | 7,121 |
| Colfax | 2,333 | 49.9% | 1,615 | 34.5% | 731 | 15.6% | 718 | 15.4% | 4,679 |
| Curry | 2,793 | 27.4% | 5,896 | 57.9% | 1,498 | 14.7% | -3,103 | -30.5% | 10,187 |
| De Baca | 267 | 33.2% | 342 | 42.5% | 196 | 24.4% | -75 | -10.3% | 805 |
| Doña Ana | 34,651 | 57.0% | 18,101 | 29.8% | 8,029 | 13.2% | 16,550 | 27.2% | 60,781 |
| Eddy | 4,834 | 30.7% | 8,826 | 56.0% | 2,095 | 13.3% | -3,992 | -19.3% | 15,755 |
| Grant | 6,763 | 57.3% | 3,598 | 30.5% | 1,442 | 12.2% | 3,165 | 26.3% | 11,803 |
| Guadalupe | 1,094 | 65.2% | 292 | 17.4% | 292 | 17.4% | 802 | 47.8% | 1,678 |
| Harding | 198 | 41.2% | 199 | 41.4% | 84 | 17.5% | -1 | -0.2% | 481 |
| Hidalgo | 790 | 49.5% | 607 | 38.1% | 198 | 12.4% | 183 | 11.4% | 1,595 |
| Lea | 3,331 | 24.1% | 8,882 | 64.2% | 1,628 | 11.8% | -5,551 | -40.1% | 13,841 |
| Lincoln | 2,617 | 33.3% | 4,122 | 52.5% | 1,111 | 14.2% | -1,505 | -19.2% | 7,850 |
| Los Alamos | 5,798 | 56.3% | 2,576 | 25.0% | 1,926 | 18.7% | 3,222 | 31.3% | 10,300 |
| Luna | 3,005 | 48.9% | 2,313 | 37.7% | 823 | 13.4% | 692 | 10.8% | 6,141 |
| McKinley | 12,409 | 67.5% | 2,915 | 15.9% | 3,049 | 16.6% | 9,360 | 50.9% (Note: Compares margin over Johnson.) | 18,373 |
| Mora | 1,564 | 67.4% | 372 | 16.0% | 386 | 16.6% | 1,178 | 50.8% | 2,322 |
| Otero | 6,370 | 37.2% | 8,460 | 49.4% | 2,291 | 13.4% | -2,090 | -12.2% | 17,121 |
| Quay | 1,016 | 32.9% | 1,534 | 49.7% | 537 | 17.4% | -518 | -16.8% | 3,087 |
| Rio Arriba | 8,773 | 68.8% | 1,945 | 15.3% | 2,035 | 16.0% | 6,738 | 62.8% | 12,753 |
| Roosevelt | 1,277 | 27.6% | 2,606 | 56.3% | 750 | 16.2% | -1,329 | -28.7% | 4,633 |
| San Juan | 12,485 | 33.4% | 18,002 | 48.2% | 6,876 | 18.4% | -5,517 | -14.8% | 37,363 |
| San Miguel | 6,609 | 71.6% | 1,298 | 14.1% | 1,323 | 14.3% | 5,286 | 57.3% | 9,230 |
| Sandoval | 28,198 | 50.9% | 17,785 | 32.1% | 9,397 | 17.0% | 10,413 | 18.8% | 55,380 |
| Santa Fe | 49,994 | 74.4% | 9,546 | 14.2% | 7,642 | 11.4% | 40,448 | 60.2% | 67,182 |
| Sierra | 1,917 | 40.5% | 2,048 | 43.3% | 767 | 16.2% | -131 | -2.8% | 4,732 |
| Socorro | 3,409 | 54.7% | 1,700 | 27.3% | 1,129 | 18.1% | 1,709 | 27.4% | 6,238 |
| Taos | 10,838 | 74.7% | 1,556 | 10.7% | 2,112 | 14.6% | 8,726 | 60.0% | 14,506 |
| Torrance | 1,982 | 36.9% | 2,433 | 45.3% | 951 | 17.7% | -451 | -8.4% | 5,366 |
| Union | 334 | 22.8% | 878 | 60.0% | 252 | 17.2% | -544 | -37.2% | 1,464 |
| Valencia | 11,514 | 47.1% | 8,790 | 35.0% | 4,139 | 16.9% | 2,724 | 12.1% | 24,443 |

Counties that flipped from Republican to Democratic

- Hidalgo (largest municipality: Lordsburg)
- Los Alamos (largest municipality: Los Alamos)
- Sandoval (largest municipality: Rio Rancho)
- Valencia (largest municipality: Los Lunas)

==== By congressional district ====
Heinrich won all three congressional districts.

| District | Heinrich | Rich | Johnson | Representative |
|---|---|---|---|---|
| 1st | 57.55% | 26.28% | 16.17% | Deb Haaland |
| 2nd | 45.56% | 40.17% | 14.27% | Xochitl Torres Small |
| 3rd | 57.52% | 27.0% | 15.48% | Ben Ray Luján |
