= Patrick H. Lyons =

American politician

Pat Lyons

25th New Mexico Commissioner of Public Lands
- In office January 1, 2003 – January 1, 2011
- Governor: Bill Richardson
- Preceded by: Ray Powell
- Succeeded by: Ray Powell

Member of the New Mexico Public Regulation Commission from the 2nd district
- In office January 1, 2011 – January 1, 2019
- Preceded by: David W. King
- Succeeded by: Jefferson Byrd

Member of the New Mexico Senate
- In office 1992–2002

Personal details
- Born: 1953 (age 72–73) Clovis, New Mexico
- Party: Republican
- Education: New Mexico State University, Las Cruces (BS); Colorado State University, Fort Collins (MS)

Patrick H. "Pat" Lyons (born 1953) is an American politician from New Mexico. He is a former chairman and commissioner of the New Mexico Public Regulation Commission. Lyons, a Republican, was elected in 2010 and re-elected in 2014. He previously served as the New Mexico Commissioner of Public Lands and as a member of the New Mexico Senate.

== Early life and education ==
Lyons was born in Clovis, New Mexico and graduated from Clovis High School in 1972. He earned a Bachelor of Science degree in agricultural economics from New Mexico State University in 1975, and in 1977, received a master's degree in agriculture from Colorado State University.

== Career ==
In 1978 and 1979, Lyons worked in the United States Department of Commerce.

Lyons served in the New Mexico State Senate from 1992 to 2002, representing six counties in northeastern New Mexico.

=== New Mexico Commissioner of Public Lands ===
Lyons served as New Mexico Commissioner of Public Lands from January 1, 2003 to December 31, 2010.

New Mexico's commissioner of public lands is responsible for revenue generation through the management of more than 9 million surface acres and 13 million mineral acres held in trust for state’s 22 beneficiaries (including public schools, penal institutions and hospitals).

=== New Mexico Public Regulation Commission ===
Lyons served as commissioner of the 2nd District of the New Mexico Public Regulation Commission from 2011 through 2018.

=== Controversies ===
During his 2003-2011 tenure as Land Commissioner, Lyons faced criticism after he orchestrated a swap of 7,205 acres of state trust land in White Peak, an area highly valued by hunters, for 3,330 acres of a fellow rancher's land. Sportsmen roundly criticized the deal, pointing out that it put prime hunting land off-limits, and after the state attorney general investigated, the Supreme Court ruled the swap illegal in 2010, and Lyons' successor reversed the deal.

A 2010 audit by the New Mexico Auditor's Office found that Lyons' Land Office had mismanaged or wasted millions of dollars of taxpayer funds.

In his 2018 campaign for another term as Commissioner of Public Lands, Lyons used a list of Land Office lessees from his time in office to solicit donations from them, which drew allegations that such appeals invited the risk of special favors to lessees Lyons would be in charge of regulating if he were elected. A significant portion of Lyons' campaign funding came from the oil and gas industry, and Chevron paid $2 million to a mostly oil-funded PAC that supports Lyons. The land commissioner has jurisdiction over lease rates, rules and air and water safeguards that govern oil and gas leases.

An investigation conducted by KRQE found that Lyons had violated state law by fabricating and awarding himself continuing education credits for routine meetings. According to state law, "to ensure expertise on technical aspects of the job... PRC Commissioners obtain 32 hours of annual continuing education relating to utility regulation. Lawmakers deemed this prerequisite to be so important that, according to statute, any Commissioner who fails to obtain the required education can't collect their salary." The investigation also found that fellow commissioner Lynda Lovejoy did not have the required number of annual continuing education hours.

== Personal life ==
Pat Lyons, a third generation New Mexican, is the owner/operator of Lyons Angus Ranch in Cuervo, New Mexico. He is an active managing rancher/farmer with a continuous cow/calf operation, buying and selling beef cattle, growing/ harvesting/ utilizing alfalfa.

Lyons is married to his wife of 26 years, Sandy. They have three children, Amy, Kimberly, and Daniel.

== Awards and recognition ==
- 2006 – Pete Porter Award from the NM Oil and Gas Association
- 2005 – Certificate of Appreciation from Chama Middle School for providing technology support
- 2004 – Certificate of Appreciation for partnership with Keep New Mexico Beautiful Association
- 2002 – President’s Award from the NM Association of Conservation Districts
- 1998 – Legislator of the Year from the NM District Attorneys’ Association
- Recognition by the Association of Retarded Citizens
- Recognition by the New Mexico Wild Life Federation
- Recognition by the New Mexico Youth Conservation Corps
- Recognition by the New Mexico Boy Scouts

Political offices
Preceded by Ray Powell	Public Lands Commissioner of New Mexico; 2003–2011	Succeeded by Ray Powell
