= New Mexico Commissioner of Public Lands =

- Seal of New Mexico
- Incumbent; Stephanie Garcia Richard since January 1, 2019
- Term length: Four years
- Formation: 1912
- First holder: Robert P. Ervien
- Website: Commissioner of Public Lands of New Mexico

The New Mexico commissioner of public lands is an elected constitutional officer in the executive branch in charge of managing all state lands and mineral rights, as well as overseeing leases and royalties on state land, in the U.S. state of New Mexico. The commissioner of public lands is elected to a four-year term and is able to serve up to two consecutive terms; more terms may be served after one full term has intervened.

Currently, Stephanie Garcia Richard is serving as the commissioner of public lands. She took office on January 1, 2019.

== List of commissioners of public lands ==
#	Name	Took office	Left office	Party	Years in office
1	Robert P. Ervien	1912	1917	Republican	<6 (Note: Since the first state election was in an odd-numbered year (1911), the term lasted five years.) (Note: Died in office in February 1917.)
2	Fred Muller	1917	1918	Republican	<2 (Note: Appointed by Governor Lindsey in 1917.)
3	Nelson A. Field	1919	1922	Republican	4
4	Justiniano Baca	1923	1925	Democrat	<3 (Note: Died in office in February 1925.)
5	Edwin B. Swope	1925	1926	Democrat	<2 (Note: Appointed by Governor Hannett in 1925.)
6	Benjamin F. Pankey	1927	1929	Republican	<3 (Note: Died in office in May 1929.)
7	Austin D. Crile	1929	1930	Republican	<2 (Note: Appointed by Governor Dillon in 1929.)
8	James F. Hinkle	1931	1932	Democrat	2
9	Frank Vesely	1933	1936	Democrat	4
10	Frank Worden	1937	1940	Democrat	4
11	H. R. Rodgers	1941	1944	Democrat	4
12	John E. Miles	1945	1948	Democrat	4
13	Guy Shepard	1949	1952	Democrat	4
14	E. S. Johnny Walker	1953	1956	Democrat	4
15	Murray E. Morgan	1957	1960	Democrat	4
16	E. S. Johnny Walker	1961	1964	Democrat	4
17	Guyton B. Hays	1965	1968	Democrat	4
18	Alex J. Armijo	1969	1974	Democrat	6
19	Phil R. Lucero	1975	1978	Democrat	4
20	Alex J. Armijo	1979	1982	Democrat	4
21	Jim Baca	1983	1986	Democrat	4
22	W. R. Humphries	1987	1990	Republican	4
23	Jim Baca	1991	1993	Democrat	<3 (Note: Resigned to become Bureau of Land Management Director in 1993.)
24	Ray Powell	1993	2002	Democrat	<10 (Note: Appointed by Governor King in 1993.)
25	Patrick H. Lyons	2003	2010	Republican	8
26	Ray Powell	2011	2014	Democrat	4
27	Aubrey Dunn Jr.	2015	2018	Republican	4
27	Aubrey Dunn Jr.	2018	2018	Libertarian (Note: Elected as a Republican, switched to Libertarian in 2018.)	4
28	Stephanie Garcia Richard	2019	Incumbent	Democratic	
