= List of United States representatives from New Mexico =

The following is an alphabetical list of United States representatives from the state of New Mexico. For chronological tables of members of both houses of the United States Congress from the state (through the present day), see New Mexico's congressional delegations. The list of names should be complete (as of January 3, 2019), but other data may be incomplete. It includes members who have represented both the state and the territory, both past and present.

== Current members ==
Updated January 3, 2025.

- 1st district: Melanie Stansbury (D) (since 2021)
- 2nd district: Gabe Vasquez (D) (since 2023)
- 3rd district: Teresa Leger Fernandez (D) (since 2021)

== List of members and delegates ==
Member/Delegate	Party	Years	District	Electoral history
Clinton P. Anderson	Democratic	January 3, 1941 – June 30, 1945	At-large	Elected in 1940. Re-elected in 1942. Re-elected in 1944. Resigned to become U.S. Secretary of Agriculture.
William Henry Andrews	Republican	March 4, 1905 – January 7, 1912	Territorial delegate	Elected in 1904. Re-elected in 1906. Re-elected in 1908. Re-elected in 1910. Position eliminated at statehood.
Thomas B. Catron	Republican	March 4, 1895 – March 3, 1897	Territorial delegate	Elected in 1894. Lost re-election to Fergusson.
Dennis Chavez	Democratic	March 4, 1931 – January 3, 1935	At-large	Elected in 1930. Re-elected in 1932. Retired to run for U.S. senator.
José Francisco Chaves	Republican	March 4, 1865 – March 3, 1867	Territorial delegate	Elected in 1864; Lost re-election to Charles P. Clever
José Francisco Chaves	Republican	February 20, 1869 – March 3, 1871	Territorial delegate	Won election contest. Lost re-election to Gallegos.
Charles P. Clever	Democratic	September 2, 1867 – February 20, 1869	Territorial delegate	Elected in 1886; Re-elected in 1868; Lost contested election to Chaves.
George Curry	Republican	January 8, 1912 – March 3, 1913	At-large	Elected in 1911 for the term starting upon 1912 statehood. Retired.
John J. Dempsey	Democratic	January 3, 1935 – January 3, 1941	At-large	Elected in 1934. Re-elected in 1936. Re-elected in 1938. Retired to run for U.S. senator.
John J. Dempsey	Democratic	January 3, 1951 – March 11, 1958	At-large	Re-elected in 1950. Re-elected in 1952. Re-elected in 1954. Re-elected in 1956. Died.
Stephen Benton Elkins	Republican	March 4, 1873 – March 3, 1877	Territorial delegate	Elected in 1872. Re-elected in 1874. Retired.
Harvey Butler Fergusson	Democratic	March 4, 1897 – March 3, 1899	Territorial delegate	Elected in 1896. Lost re-election to P. Perea.
Harvey Butler Fergusson	Democratic	January 8, 1912 – March 3, 1915	At-large	Elected in 1911 for the term starting upon 1912 statehood. Re-elected in 1912. Lost re-election to Hernández.
Antonio M. Fernández	Democratic	January 3, 1943 – November 7, 1956	At-large	Re-elected in 1942. Re-elected in 1944. Re-elected in 1946. Re-elected in 1948. Re-elected in 1950. Re-elected in 1952. Re-elected in 1954. Re-elected in 1956. Died.
Ed Foreman	Republican	January 3, 1969 – January 3, 1971	2nd	Elected in 1968. Lost re-election to Runnels.
José Manuel Gallegos	Republican	March 4, 1853 – July 23, 1856	Territorial delegate	Elected in 1853. Re-elected in 1855. Lost election contest to M.A. Otero.
José Manuel Gallegos	Republican	March 4, 1871 – March 3, 1873	Territorial delegate	Elected in 1870. Lost re-election to Elkins.
Deb Haaland	Democratic	January 3, 2019 – March 16, 2021	1st	Elected in 2018. Re-elected in 2020. Resigned to become U.S. Secretary of the Interior.
Martin Heinrich	Democratic	January 3, 2009 – January 3, 2013	1st	Elected in 2008. Re-elected in 2010. Retired to run for U.S. senator.
Benigno C. Hernández	Republican	March 4, 1915 – March 3, 1917	At-large	Elected in 1914. Lost re-election to Walton.
Benigno C. Hernández	Republican	March 4, 1919 – March 3, 1921	At-large	Elected in 1918. Retired.
Yvette Herrell	Republican	January 3, 2021 – January 3, 2023	2nd	Elected in 2020. Lost re-election to Vasquez.
Antonio Joseph	Democratic	March 4, 1885 – March 3, 1895	Territorial delegate	Elected in 1884. Re-elected in 1886. Re-elected in 1888. Re-elected in 1890. Re-elected in 1892. Lost re-election to Catron.
Teresa Leger Fernandez	Democratic	January 3, 2021 – present	3rd	Elected in 2020. Re-elected in 2022. Re-elected in 2024. Incumbent.
Ben R. Luján	Democratic	January 3, 2009 – January 3, 2021	3rd	Elected in 2008. Re-elected in 2010. Re-elected in 2012. Re-elected in 2014. Re-elected in 2016. Re-elected in 2018. Retired to successfully run for U.S. senator.
Manuel Lujan Jr.	Republican	January 3, 1969 – January 3, 1989	1st	Elected in 1968. Re-elected in 1970. Re-elected in 1972. Re-elected in 1974. Re-elected in 1976. Re-elected in 1978. Re-elected in 1980. Re-elected in 1982. Re-elected in 1984. Re-elected in 1986. Retired.
Michelle Lujan Grisham	Democratic	January 3, 2013 – December 31, 2018	1st	Elected in 2012. Re-elected in 2014. Re-elected in 2016. Retired to run for Governor of New Mexico and resigned early.
Tranqulino Luna	Republican	March 4, 1881 – March 5, 1884	Territorial delegate	Elected in 1880. Re-elected in 1882. Lost election contest to Manzanares.
Georgia Lee Lusk	Democratic	January 3, 1947 – January 3, 1949	At-large	Elected in 1946. Lost renomination to Miles.
Francisco Antonio Manzanares	Democratic	March 5, 1884 – March 3, 1885	Territorial delegate	Won contested election. Retired.
John E. Miles	Democratic	January 3, 1949 – January 3, 1951	At-large	Elected in 1948. Retired.
Joseph Montoya	Democratic	April 9, 1957 – November 3, 1964	At-large	Elected to finish Fernández's term. Re-elected in 1958. Re-elected in 1960. Re-elected in 1962. Retired to run for U.S. senator and resigned early.
Néstor Montoya	Republican	March 4, 1921 – January 13, 1923	At-large	Elected in 1920. Retired but died before term expired.
Thomas G. Morris	Democratic	January 3, 1959 – January 3, 1969	At-large	Elected in 1958. Re-elected in 1960. Re-elected in 1962. Re-elected in 1964. Re-elected in 1966. Redistricted to the 1st district and lost re-election to Lujan.
John Morrow	Democratic	March 4, 1923 – March 3, 1929	At-large	Elected in 1922. Re-elected in 1924. Re-elected in 1926. Lost re-election to Simms.
Mariano S. Otero	Republican	March 4, 1879 – March 3, 1881	Territorial delegate	Elected in 1878. Retired
Miguel A. Otero	Democratic	July 23, 1856 – March 3, 1861	Territorial delegate	Won contested election. Re-elected in 1857. Re-elected in 1859. Retired.
Steve Pearce	Republican	January 3, 2003 – January 3, 2009	2nd	Elected in 2002. Re-elected in 2004. Re-elected in 2006. Retired to run for U.S. senator.
Steve Pearce	Republican	January 3, 2011 – January 3, 2019	2nd	Elected in 2010. Re-elected in 2012. Re-elected in 2014. Re-elected in 2016. Retired to run for Governor of New Mexico.
Francisco Perea	Republican	March 4, 1863 – March 3, 1865	Territorial delegate	Elected in 1862. Lost renomination to Chaves.
Pedro Perea	Republican	March 4, 1899 – March 3, 1901	Territorial delegate	Elected in 1898. Retired.
Bill Redmond	Republican	May 13, 1997 – January 3, 1999	3rd	Elected to finish Richardson's term. Lost re-election to Udall.
Bill Richardson	Democratic	January 3, 1983 – February 13, 1997	3rd	Elected in 1982. Re-elected in 1984. Re-elected in 1986. Re-elected in 1988. Re-elected in 1990. Re-elected in 1992. Re-elected in 1994. Re-elected in 1996. Resigned to become U.S. Ambassador to the United Nations.
Bernard Shandon Rodey	Republican	March 4, 1901 – March 3, 1905	Territorial delegate	Elected in 1900. Re-elected in 1902. Lost renomination to Andrews.
Trinidad Romero	Republican	March 4, 1877 – March 3, 1879	Territorial delegate	Elected in 1876. Retired
Harold L. Runnels	Democratic	January 3, 1971 – August 5, 1980	2nd	Elected in 1970. Re-elected in 1972. Re-elected in 1974. Re-elected in 1976. Re-elected in 1978. Died.
Steven Schiff	Republican	January 3, 1989 – March 25, 1998	1st	Elected in 1988. Re-elected in 1990. Re-elected in 1992. Re-elected in 1994. Re-elected in 1996. Died.
Albert G. Simms	Republican	March 4, 1929 – March 3, 1931	At-large	Elected in 1928. Lost re-election to Chavez.
Joe Skeen	Republican	January 3, 1981 – January 3, 2003	2nd	Elected in 1980. Re-elected in 1982. Re-elected in 1984. Re-elected in 1986. Re-elected in 1988. Re-elected in 1990. Re-elected in 1992. Re-elected in 1994. Re-elected in 1996. Re-elected in 1998. Re-elected in 2000. Retired.
Melanie Stansbury	Democratic	June 1, 2021 – present	1st	Elected to finish Haaland's term. Re-elected in 2022. Re-elected in 2024. Incumbent.
Harry Teague	Democratic	January 3, 2009 – January 3, 2011	2nd	Elected in 2008. Lost re-election to Pearce.
Xochitl Torres Small	Democratic	January 3, 2019 – January 3, 2021	2nd	Elected in 2018. Lost re-election to Herrell.
Tom Udall	Democratic	January 3, 1999 – January 3, 2009	3rd	Elected in 1998. Re-elected in 2000. Re-elected in 2002. Re-elected in 2004. Re-elected in 2006. Retired to run for U.S. senator.
Gabe Vasquez	Democratic	January 3, 2023 – present	2nd	Elected in 2022. Re-elected in 2024. Incumbent.
William B. Walton	Democratic	March 4, 1917 – March 3, 1919	At-large	Elected in 1916. Retired to run for U.S. senator.
E. S. Johnny Walker	Democratic	January 3, 1965 – January 3, 1969	At-large	Elected in 1964. Re-elected in 1966. Redistricted to the 2nd district and lost re-election to Foreman.
John Sebrie Watts	Republican	March 4, 1861 – March 3, 1863	Territorial delegate	Elected in 1860. Retired.
Richard Hanson Weightman	Democratic	March 4, 1851 – March 3, 1853	Territorial delegate	Elected in 1851. Retired.
Heather Wilson	Republican	June 25, 1998 – January 3, 2009	1st	Elected to finish Schiff's term. Re-elected in November 1998. Re-elected in 2000. Re-elected in 2002. Re-elected in 2004. Re-elected in 2006. Retired to run for U.S. senator.

== See also ==
- List of United States senators from New Mexico
- New Mexico's congressional delegations
- New Mexico's congressional districts
