= New Mexico's 1st congressional district =

U.S. House district for New Mexico

Coordinates: 34°46′18″N 106°03′04″W

- Interactive map of district boundaries since January 3, 2023
- Representative: Melanie Stansbury; D–Albuquerque
- Distribution: 91.35% urban; 8.65% rural
- Population (2025): 703,721
- Median household income: $80,264
- Ethnicity: 45.5% White; 40.9% Hispanic; 4.2% Native American; 3.6% Two or more races; 2.8% Asian; 2.4% Black; 0.6% other
- Cook PVI: D+7

New Mexico's 1st congressional district of the United States House of Representatives serves the central area of New Mexico, including most of Bernalillo County, all of Torrance County, and parts of Sandoval, Santa Fe, and Valencia counties. It includes almost three-fourths of Albuquerque. The district has a notable Native American presence, encompassing several pueblos, including the Pueblo of Laguna and Sandia Pueblo, and the Tohajiilee Navajo Reservation outside Albuquerque. The seat is currently represented by Democrat Melanie Stansbury. With a Cook Partisan Voting Index rating of D+7, it is the most Democratic district in New Mexico, a state with an all-Democratic congressional delegation.

Unlike other districts in the state, in recent years this district has had a strong track record of its representatives ascending to higher office. Deb Haaland, Stansbury's predecessor, resigned in 2021 to become the United States Secretary of the Interior. Her predecessor, Michelle Lujan Grisham, took office as governor of New Mexico in 2019. Grisham's own predecessor, Martin Heinrich, was elected to the United States Senate in 2012.

== History ==
Until the 1968 elections, New Mexico's representatives were all elected at-large statewide. Starting in 1969, however, they were elected by districts.

=== Historical district boundaries ===
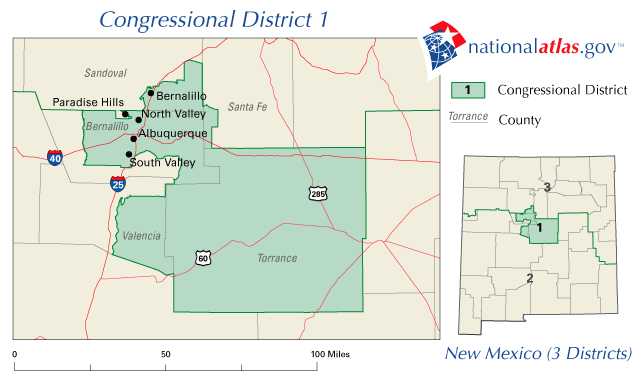
2003–2013

== Recent election results from statewide races ==
Year	Office	Results
2008	President	Obama 56–43%
2008	Senate	Udall 60–40%
2010	Governor	Martinez 55–45%
2010	Secretary of State	Duran 61–39%
2010	Attorney General	King 51–49%
2010	Auditor	Balderas 53–47%
2010	Treasurer	Lewis 54–46%
2012	President	Obama 54–46%
2012	Senate	Heinrich 49–47%
2014	Senate	Udall 53–47%
2014	Governor	Martinez 59–41%
2014	Secretary of State	Duran 51–49%
2014	Attorney General	Balderas 58–42%
2014	Auditor	Keller 55–45%
2014	Treasurer	Eichenberg 52–48%
2016	President	Clinton 47–39%
2016	Secretary of State (Spec.)	Toulouse Oliver 58–42%
2018	Senate	Heinrich 54–30%
2018	Governor	Lujan Grisham 57–43%
2018	Attorney General	Balderas 63–32%
2018	Auditor	Colón 59–41%
2020	President	Biden 54–44%
2020	Senate	Ray Luján 52–45%
2022	Governor	Lujan Grisham 52–46%
2022	Secretary of State	Toulouse Oliver 57–41%
2022	Attorney General	Torrez 56–44%
2022	Treasurer	L. Montoya 54–46%
2024	President	Harris 52–46%
2024	Senate	Heinrich 55–45%

== Composition ==
For the 118th and successive Congresses (based on redistricting following the 2020 census), the district contains all or portions of the following counties and communities:

Bernalillo County (18)

Albuquerque (part; also 2nd), Barton (shared with Santa Fe County), Carnuel, Cedar Crest, Cedro, Chilili, Edgewood (shared with Sandoval and Santa Fe counties), Edith Enclave, Kirtland AFB, Los Ranchos de Albuquerque, Manzano Springs (shared with Torrance County), North Valley, Paa-Ko, Paradise Hills, Ponderosa Pine, San Antonito, Sandia Heights, Sandia Knolls, Sedillo, Tijeras

Chaves County (1)

Roswell (part; also 3rd)

De Baca County (2)

Fort Sumner, Lake Sumner

Guadalupe County (7)

All 7 communities

Lincoln County (6)

All 6 communities

Otero County (0)

No incorporated or census-recognized communities

Sandoval County (8)

Bernalillo, Corrales, Edgewood (shared with Bernalillo and Santa Fe counties) La Madera, Placitas, Pueblo of Sandia Village, Rio Rancho (part; also 2nd; shared with Bernalillo County), Rio Rancho Estates (part; also 3rd)

Santa Fe County (5)

Barton (shared with Bernalillo County), Cedar Grove (part; also 3rd), Edgewood (shared with Bernalillo and Sandoval counties), San Pedro (part; also 3rd), Thunder Mountain

Torrance County (14)

All 14 communities

Valencia County (12)

Adelino, Bosque Farms, El Cerro, El Cerro Mission, Las Maravillas, Meadow Lake, Monterey Park, Los Lunas (part; also 2nd), Peralta, Rio Communities, Tome, Valencia

== List of members representing the district ==
Member (district home)	Party	Years	Cong ress	Electoral history	District location
District established January 3, 1969
Manuel Lujan Jr. (Albuquerque)	Republican	January 3, 1969 – January 3, 1989	91st 92nd 93rd 94th 95th 96th 97th 98th 99th 100th	Elected in 1968. Re-elected in 1970. Re-elected in 1972. Re-elected in 1974. Re-elected in 1976. Re-elected in 1978. Re-elected in 1980. Re-elected in 1982. Re-elected in 1984. Re-elected in 1986. Retired.	1969–1983 [data missing]
Manuel Lujan Jr. (Albuquerque)	Republican	January 3, 1969 – January 3, 1989	91st 92nd 93rd 94th 95th 96th 97th 98th 99th 100th	Elected in 1968. Re-elected in 1970. Re-elected in 1972. Re-elected in 1974. Re-elected in 1976. Re-elected in 1978. Re-elected in 1980. Re-elected in 1982. Re-elected in 1984. Re-elected in 1986. Retired.	1983–1993; Bernalillo, De Baca, Guadalupe, and Torrance
Steven Schiff (Albuquerque)	Republican	January 3, 1989 – March 25, 1998	101st 102nd 103rd 104th 105th	Elected in 1988. Re-elected in 1990. Re-elected in 1992. Re-elected in 1994. Re-elected in 1996. Died.	1983–1993; Bernalillo, De Baca, Guadalupe, and Torrance
Steven Schiff (Albuquerque)	Republican	January 3, 1989 – March 25, 1998	101st 102nd 103rd 104th 105th	Elected in 1988. Re-elected in 1990. Re-elected in 1992. Re-elected in 1994. Re-elected in 1996. Died.	1993–2003; Torrance; parts of Bernalillo, Sandoval, Santa Fe, and Valencia
Vacant		March 25, 1998 – June 25, 1998	105th		1993–2003; Torrance; parts of Bernalillo, Sandoval, Santa Fe, and Valencia
Heather Wilson (Albuquerque)	Republican	June 25, 1998 – January 3, 2009	105th 106th 107th 108th 109th 110th	Elected to finish Schiff's term. Re-elected in 1998. Re-elected in 2000. Re-elected in 2002. Re-elected in 2004. Re-elected in 2006. Retired to run for U.S. senator.	1993–2003; Torrance; parts of Bernalillo, Sandoval, Santa Fe, and Valencia
Heather Wilson (Albuquerque)	Republican	June 25, 1998 – January 3, 2009	105th 106th 107th 108th 109th 110th	Elected to finish Schiff's term. Re-elected in 1998. Re-elected in 2000. Re-elected in 2002. Re-elected in 2004. Re-elected in 2006. Retired to run for U.S. senator.	2003–2013 Torrance; parts of Bernalillo, Sandoval, Santa Fe, and Valencia
Martin Heinrich (Albuquerque)	Democratic	January 3, 2009 – January 3, 2013	111th 112th	Elected in 2008. Re-elected in 2010. Retired to run for U.S. senator.	2003–2013 Torrance; parts of Bernalillo, Sandoval, Santa Fe, and Valencia
Michelle Lujan Grisham (Albuquerque)	Democratic	January 3, 2013 – January 1, 2019	113th 114th 115th	Elected in 2012. Re-elected in 2014. Re-elected in 2016. Resigned when elected Governor of New Mexico.	2013–2023 Torrance; parts of Bernalillo, Sandoval, Santa Fe, and Valencia
Vacant		January 1, 2019 – January 3, 2019	115th		2013–2023 Torrance; parts of Bernalillo, Sandoval, Santa Fe, and Valencia
Deb Haaland (Albuquerque)	Democratic	January 3, 2019 – March 16, 2021	116th 117th	Elected in 2018. Re-elected in 2020. Resigned to become U.S. Secretary of the Interior.	2013–2023 Torrance; parts of Bernalillo, Sandoval, Santa Fe, and Valencia
Vacant		March 16, 2021 – June 14, 2021	117th		2013–2023 Torrance; parts of Bernalillo, Sandoval, Santa Fe, and Valencia
Melanie Stansbury (Albuquerque)	Democratic	June 14, 2021 – present	117th 118th 119th	Elected to finish Haaland's term. Re-elected in 2022. Re-elected in 2024. Re-elected in 2026.	2013–2023 Torrance; parts of Bernalillo, Sandoval, Santa Fe, and Valencia
Melanie Stansbury (Albuquerque)	Democratic	June 14, 2021 – present	117th 118th 119th	Elected to finish Haaland's term. Re-elected in 2022. Re-elected in 2024. Re-elected in 2026.	2023–present De Baca, Guadalupe, Lincoln, and Torrance; parts of Bernalillo, Chaves, Otero, Sandoval, Santa Fe, and Valencia

== Election results ==
=== 1968 ===
1968 United States House of Representatives elections in New Mexico, district 1
Party	Candidate	Votes	%
Republican	Manuel Lujan Jr.	88,517	52.85
Democratic	Thomas G. Morris	78,117	46.64
Independent	William Higgs	854	0.51
Total votes		167,488	100.00
Republican win (new seat)			

=== 1970 ===
1970 United States House of Representatives elections in New Mexico, district 1
Party	Candidate	Votes	%
Republican	Manuel Lujan Jr. (incumbent)	91,187	58.53
Democratic	Fabian Chavez Jr.	64,598	41.47
Total votes		155,785	100.00
Republican hold			

=== 1972 ===
1972 United States House of Representatives elections in New Mexico, district 1
Party	Candidate	Votes	%
Republican	Manuel Lujan Jr. (incumbent)	118,403	55.68
Democratic	Eugene Gallegos	94,239	44.32
Total votes		212,642	100.00
Republican hold			

=== 1974 ===
1974 United States House of Representatives elections in New Mexico, district 1
Party	Candidate	Votes	%
Republican	Manuel Lujan Jr. (incumbent)	106,268	58.61
Democratic	Roberto Mondragón	71,968	39.69
American Independent	Martin Molloy	3,069	1.70
Total votes		181,305	100.00
Republican hold			

=== 1976 ===
1976 United States House of Representatives elections in New Mexico, district 1
Party	Candidate	Votes	%
Republican	Manuel Lujan Jr. (incumbent)	162,587	72.09
Democratic	Raymond Garcia	61,800	27.40
Raza Unida	Jesus Aragom	1,159	0.51
Total votes		225,546	100.00
Republican hold			

=== 1978 ===
1978 United States House of Representatives elections in New Mexico, district 1
Party	Candidate	Votes	%
Republican	Manuel Lujan Jr. (incumbent)	118,075	62.53
Democratic	Robert M. Hawk	70,761	37.47
Total votes		188,836	100.00
Republican hold			

=== 1980 ===
1980 United States House of Representatives elections in New Mexico, district 1
Party	Candidate	Votes	%
Republican	Manuel Lujan Jr. (incumbent)	125,910	51.01
Democratic	Bill Richardson	120,903	48.99
Total votes		246,813	100.00
Republican hold			

=== 1982 ===
1982 United States House of Representatives elections in New Mexico, district 1
Party	Candidate	Votes	%
Republican	Manuel Lujan Jr. (incumbent)	74,459	52.44
Democratic	Jan A. Hartke	67,534	47.56
Total votes		141,993	100.00
Republican hold			

=== 1984 ===
1984 United States House of Representatives elections in New Mexico, district 1
Party	Candidate	Votes	%
Republican	Manuel Lujan Jr. (incumbent)	115,808	64.94
Democratic	Charles Ted Asbury	60,598	33.98
Libertarian	Stephen P. Curtis	1,936	1.08
Total votes		178,342	100.00
Republican hold			

=== 1986 ===
1986 United States House of Representatives elections in New Mexico, district 1
Party	Candidate	Votes	%
Republican	Manuel Lujan Jr. (incumbent)	90,476	70.89
Democratic	Manny Garcia	37,138	29.10
Write-in		18	0.01
Total votes		127,632	100.00
Republican hold			

=== 1988 ===
1988 United States House of Representatives elections in New Mexico, district 1
Party	Candidate	Votes	%
Republican	Steven Schiff	89,985	50.56
Democratic	Tom Udall	84,138	47.28
Libertarian	Allen Montgomery Parkman	3,839	2.16
Total votes		177,962	100.00
Republican hold			

=== 1990 ===
1990 United States House of Representatives elections in New Mexico, district 1
Party	Candidate	Votes	%
Republican	Steven Schiff (incumbent)	97,375	70.22
Democratic	Rebecca Vigil-Giron	41,306	29.78
Total votes		138,681	100.00
Republican hold			

=== 1992 ===
1992 United States House of Representatives elections in New Mexico, district 1
Party	Candidate	Votes	%
Republican	Steven Schiff (incumbent)	128,426	62.58
Democratic	Robert J. Aragon	76,600	37.33
Write-in		188	0.09
Total votes		205,214	100.00
Republican hold			

=== 1994 ===
1994 United States House of Representatives elections in New Mexico, district 1
Party	Candidate	Votes	%
Republican	Steven Schiff (incumbent)	119,996	73.93
Democratic	Peter L. Zollinger	42,316	26.07
Total votes		162,312	100.00
Republican hold			

=== 1996 ===
1996 United States House of Representatives elections in New Mexico, district 1
Party	Candidate	Votes	%
Republican	Steven Schiff (incumbent)	109,290	56.60
Democratic	John Wertheim	71,635	37.10
Green	John A. Uhrich	7,694	3.98
Independent	Betty Turrietta-Koury	4,459	2.32
Total votes		193,078	100.00
Republican hold			

=== 1998 (Special) ===
1998 New Mexico's 1st congressional district special election
Party	Candidate	Votes	%
Republican	Heather Wilson	54,853	44.58
Democratic	Phillip Maloof	48,747	39.62
Green	Robert Anderson	18,108	14.72
Libertarian	Bruce Bush	1,337	1.09
Total votes		123,045	100.00
Republican hold			

=== 1998 ===
1998 United States House of Representatives elections in New Mexico, district 1
Party	Candidate	Votes	%
Republican	Heather Wilson (incumbent)	86,784	48.44
Democratic	Phillip Maloof	75,040	41.88
Green	Robert Anderson	17,266	9.64
Write-in		78	0.04
Total votes		179,168	100.00
Republican hold			

=== 2000 ===
2000 United States House of Representatives elections in New Mexico, district 1
Party	Candidate	Votes	%
Republican	Heather Wilson (incumbent)	107,296	50.34
Democratic	John J. Kelly	92,187	43.25
Green	Daniel Kerlinsky	13,656	6.41
Total votes		213,139	100.00
Republican hold			

=== 2002 ===
2002 United States House of Representatives elections in New Mexico, district 1
Party	Candidate	Votes	%
Republican	Heather Wilson (incumbent)	95,711	55.34
Democratic	Richard M. Romero	77,234	44.66
Total votes		172,945	100.00
Republican hold			

=== 2004 ===
2004 United States House of Representatives elections in New Mexico, district 1
Party	Candidate	Votes	%
Republican	Heather Wilson (incumbent)	147,372	54.40
Democratic	Richard M. Romero	123,339	45.53
Republican	Orlin G. Cole (write-in)	194	0.07
Total votes		270,905	100.00
Republican hold			

=== 2006 ===
2006 United States House of Representatives elections in New Mexico, district 1
Party	Candidate	Votes	%
Republican	Heather Wilson (incumbent)	105,986	50.20
Democratic	Patricia A. Madrid	105,125	49.80
Total votes		211,111	100.00
Republican hold			

=== 2008 ===
2008 United States House of Representatives elections in New Mexico, district 1
Party	Candidate	Votes	%
Democratic	Martin Heinrich	166,271	55.65
Republican	Darren White	132,485	44.35
Total votes		298,756	100.00
Democratic gain from Republican			

=== 2010 ===
2010 United States House of Representatives elections in New Mexico, district 1
Party	Candidate	Votes	%
Democratic	Martin Heinrich (incumbent)	112,707	51.88
Republican	Jon Barela	104,543	48.12
Total votes		217,250	100.00
Democratic hold			

=== 2012 ===
New Mexico 1st Congressional District 2012
Party	Candidate	Votes	%
Democratic	Michelle Lujan Grisham	162,924	59.06
Republican	Janice Arnold-Jones	112,473	40.77
Green	Jeanne Pahls (write-in)	459	0.17
Total votes		275,856	100.00
Democratic hold			

=== 2014 ===
2014 United States House of Representatives elections in New Mexico, district 1
Party	Candidate	Votes	%
Democratic	Michelle Lujan Grisham (incumbent)	105,474	58.59
Republican	Michael Frese	74,558	41.41
Total votes		180,032	100.00
Democratic hold			

=== 2016 ===
2016 United States House of Representatives elections in New Mexico, district 1
Party	Candidate	Votes	%
Democratic	Michelle Lujan Grisham (incumbent)	181,088	65.15
Republican	Richard Gregory Priem	96,879	34.85
Total votes		277,967	100.00
Democratic hold			

=== 2018 ===
2018 United States House of Representatives elections in New Mexico, district 1
Party	Candidate	Votes	%
Democratic	Deb Haaland	144,302	59.02
Republican	Janice Arnold-Jones	89,066	36.43
Libertarian	Lloyd J Princeton	11,143	4.56
Total votes		244,511	100.00
Democratic hold			

=== 2020 ===
2020 United States House of Representatives elections in New Mexico, district 1
Party	Candidate	Votes	%
Democratic	Deb Haaland (incumbent)	186,953	58.19
Republican	Michelle Garcia Holmes	134,337	41.81
Total votes		321,290	100.00
Democratic hold			

=== 2021 (special) ===
New Mexico's 1st congressional district special election, 2021
Party	Candidate	Votes	%
Democratic	Melanie Stansbury	79,837	60.36
Republican	Mark Moores	47,111	35.62
Independent	Aubrey Dunn Jr.	3,534	2.67
Libertarian	Chris Manning	1,734	1.31
Write-in		46	0.03
Total votes		132,262	100.00
Democratic hold			

=== 2022 ===
2022 United States House of Representatives elections in New Mexico, district 1
Party	Candidate	Votes	%
Democratic	Melanie Stansbury (incumbent)	156,462	55.75
Republican	Michelle Garcia Holmes	124,151	44.23
Write-in		58	0.02
Total votes		280,671	100.00
Democratic hold			

=== 2024 ===
2024 United States House of Representatives elections in New Mexico, district 1
Party	Candidate	Votes	%
Democratic	Melanie Stansbury (incumbent)	193,203	56.37
Republican	Steve Jones	149,546	43.63
Total votes		342,749	100.00
Democratic hold			

== See also ==
- New Mexico's congressional districts
- List of United States congressional districts
