= 1980 United States House of Representatives elections in New Mexico =

- November 4, 1980

All 2 New Mexico seats to the United States House of Representatives
	Majority party	Minority party	Third party
Party	Republican	Democratic	Independent
Last election	1	1	0
Seats won	2	0	0
Seat change	▲1	▼1	Steady
Popular vote	187,474	175,988	45,343
Percentage	45.9%	43.0%	11.1%
Swing	▲4.4%	▼15.5%	▲11.1%
District results
Republican
30–40%
50–60%

The 1980 United States House of Representatives election in New Mexico was held on Tuesday November 4, 1980 to elect the state's two representatives to serve in the 97th United States Congress. Primary elections were held on June 3, 1980.

Republicans held on to the 1st District and flipped the 2nd district. This was the first time republicans held both districts in New Mexico since 1968.

== Overview ==
United States House of Representatives elections in New Mexico, 1980
Party	Votes	Percentage	Seats	+/–
Republican	187,474	45.86%	1	+1
Democratic	175,988	43.05%	0	-1
Independent	45,343	11.09%	0	—
Totals	408,805	100.00%	2	—

== District 1 ==
New Mexico's 1st congressional district election, 1980
Party	Candidate	Votes	%
Republican	Manuel Lujan Jr. (incumbent)	125,910	51.01
Democratic	Bill Richardson	120,903	48.99
Total votes		246,813	100.00
Republican hold			

== District 2 ==
1980 New Mexico's 2nd congressional district election
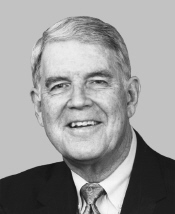

Nominee	Joe Skeen	David W. King	Dorothy Runnels
Party	Republican	Democratic	Independent
Popular vote	61,564	55,085	45,343
Percentage	38.00%	34.01%	27.99%
- County results Skeen: 30–40% 40–50% 50–60% King: 40–50% 50–60% Runnels: 50–60%
U.S. Representative before election
Harold L. Runnels
Democratic
Elected U.S. Representative
Joe Skeen
Republican

=== Democratic primary ===
At the beginning of 1980, Harold Runnels was a popular five-term member of Congress. No Democrat had filed to run against him in the primary since 1970, and his support among Republicans was so strong that no Republican bothered to run against him in either 1978 or 1980. Runnels was sending out feelers about a possible candidacy for NM Governor in 1982.

In 1980, however, a Democrat chose to run against Runnels. The manager of Sierra County, Gil M. Olguin, announced his candidacy on February 2, 1980 and began to collect signatures. He filed his candidacy papers the same day as Runnels. Harold Runnels in the end won the primary 80-20%.

==== Candidates ====
Gil M. Olguin

Harold L. Runnels, Incumbent Representative

==== Primary results ====
Democratic primary results
Party	Candidate	Votes	%
Democratic	Harold L. Runnels (incumbent)	56,650	80.15
Democratic	Gil M. Olguin	14,003	19.85
Total votes		70,653	100.0

=== Background ===
US Rep. Harold Runnels was a popular Democrat who had severe health problems in his final two years of life. He had cancer surgery in 1979, and he only agreed to run for another term after tests showed he was cancer-free. Just a week after defeating his only opponent in 1980 in the Democratic primary, however, Runnels began to suffer from lung congestion. He went to the Sloane-Kettering Hospital in NYC twice to see specialists, and he died there on August 5, 1980.

=== Replacement Candidate ===
Speculation began immediately about a replacement candidate. The NM Attorney General issued an opinion that since no Republican filed for the primary, it was too late for them to list a nominee on the ballot. Dorothy Runnels, widow of the deceased congressman, was interested in running, and Republicans in general believed she would be to their liking The Democrats scheduled a meeting to select their nominee on August 23. Dorothy Runnels announced her candidacy on August 9. The nephew of Gov Bruce King, David King (then serving as state finance secretary), changed his official residence to the second congressional district just after Rep. Runnels's funeral and announced his candidacy, which seemed inappropriate to many Democrats. Democrats found this a good opportunity to increase the number of women in Congress, and on August 19. more than half of Democrats in the US House, along with the entire party leadership, signed a letter endorsing her. When the Democrats met, however, political pressure from the governor was too great; King was nominated with 55 votes to 27 for Runnels and 4 for Olguin.

=== Campaign ===
Dorothy runnels decided to run a Write in campaign as she had not expected to gain ballot access. Her attorney continued to seek ballot status through litigation but failed. A poll by KOAT-TV released on September 24 showed Runnels leading with 36% to Skeen 28%, King 18%, and State Sen. Aubrey Dunn with 7%. However, in the end Republican Joe Skeen won the election with just 38% of the vote.

=== Results ===
New Mexico's 2nd congressional district election, 1980
Party	Candidate	Votes	%
Republican	Joe Skeen	61,564	38.00
Democratic	David W. King	55,085	34.01
Independent	Dorothy Runnels	45,343	27.99
Total votes		161,992	100.00
Republican gain from Democratic			
