= New Mexico's 2nd congressional district =

U.S. House district for New Mexico

Coordinates: 33°23′07″N 106°17′58″W

- Interactive map of district boundaries since January 3, 2023
- Representative: Gabe Vasquez; D–Las Cruces
- Distribution: 70.82% urban; 29.18% rural
- Population (2025): 723,622
- Median household income: $63,588
- Ethnicity: 59.9% Hispanic; 29.4% White; 5.0% Native American; 2.3% Two or more races; 1.8% Black; 1.1% Asian; 0.5% other
- Cook PVI: EVEN

New Mexico's 2nd congressional district serves the southern half of New Mexico, including Las Cruces, and the southern fourth of Albuquerque. It is currently represented by Democrat Gabe Vasquez.

The district was one of 13 congressional districts that voted for Donald Trump in the 2024 presidential election while simultaneously electing a Democrat in the 2024 House of Representatives elections.

== History ==
Historically, the district has leaned more Republican than New Mexico's other two districts, particularly in presidential elections. In the 2020 election, Republican candidate Yvette Herrell defeated Democratic representative Xochitl Torres Small in a rematch of their race in 2018. Herrell is the third Native woman elected to Congress and she assumed office on January 3, 2021. Following the 2020 census, each congressional district in the state underwent redistricting "to ensure that each district has a variety of constituents better reflecting the diversity of interests in New Mexico as a whole." This district was made much more Democratic, as it gained more of Albuquerque while losing some heavily Republican areas in the eastern part of the state. With a tight margin, Democratic challenger Gabe Vasquez won the 2022 midterm election. Nevertheless, with a Cook Partisan Voting Index rating of EVEN, it is the least Democratic district in New Mexico, a state with an all-Democratic congressional delegation.

== Recent election results from statewide races ==
Year	Office	Results
2008	President	Obama 57–42%
2008	Senate	Udall 60–40%
2010	Governor	Martinez 55–45%
2010	Secretary of State	Duran 54–46%
2010	Attorney General	King 54–46%
2010	Auditor	Balderas 54–46%
2010	Treasurer	Lewis 54–46%
2012	President	Obama 55–45%
2012	Senate	Heinrich 52–44%
2014	Senate	Udall 54–46%
2014	Governor	Martinez 59–41%
2014	Secretary of State	Duran 54–46%
2014	Attorney General	Balderas 55–45%
2014	Auditor	Keller 51–49%
2014	Treasurer	Eichenberg 50.1–49.9%
2016	President	Clinton 48–42%
2016	Secretary of State (Spec.)	Toulouse Oliver 54–46%
2018	Senate	Heinrich 53–33%
2018	Governor	Lujan Grisham 55–44%
2018	Attorney General	Balderas 59–36%
2018	Auditor	Colón 55–45%
2020	President	Biden 52–46%
2020	Senate	Ray Luján 50–47%
2022	Governor	Ronchetti 49–48%
2022	Secretary of State	Toulouse Oliver 50–47%
2022	Attorney General	Torrez 52–48%
2022	Treasurer	H. Montoya 50.1–49.9%
2024	President	Trump 50–48%
2024	Senate	Heinrich 52–48%

== Composition ==
For the 118th and successive Congresses (based on redistricting following the 2020 census), the district contains all or portions of the following counties and communities:

Bernalillo County (5)

Albuquerque (part; also 1st), Isleta, Pajarito Mesa, Rio Rancho (part; also 1st; shared with Sandoval County), South Valley

Catron County (18)

All 18 communities

Chaves County (0)

No incorporated municipalities or census-recognized places

Cibola County (34)

All 34 communities

Doña Ana County (30)

All 30 communities

Eddy County (10)

Atoka (part; also 3rd), Carlsbad, Happy Valley, Hope, La Huerta, Livingston Wheeler, Loco Hills, Loving, Malaga, Whites City

Grant County (26)

All 26 communities

Hidalgo County (8)

All 8 communities

Lea County (5)

Eunice, Hobbs (part; also 3rd), Jal, Monument, Nadine

Luna County (11)

All 11 communities

McKinley County (3)

Ramah, Timberlake (shared with Cibola County), Zuni Pueblo

Otero County (17)

All 17 communities

Sierra County (11)

All 11 communities

Socorro County (16)

All 16 communities

Valencia County (9)

Belen, Casa Colorada, Highland Meadows, Jarales, Los Chaves, Los Lunas, Madrone, Pueblitos, Sausal

== List of members representing the district ==
Member (Residence)	Party	Years	Cong ress	Electoral history	District location
District established January 3, 1969
Ed Foreman (Las Cruces)	Republican	January 3, 1969 – January 3, 1971	91st	Elected in 1968. Lost re-election.	1969–1983; Catron, Chaves, Curry, De Baca, Doña Ana, Eddy, Grant, Hidalgo, Lea, Lincoln, Luna, McKinley, Otero, Roosevelt, San Juan, Sierra, Socorro, and Valencia
Harold Runnels (Lovington)	Democratic	January 3, 1971 – August 5, 1980	92nd 93rd 94th 95th 96th	Elected in 1970. Re-elected in 1972. Re-elected in 1974. Re-elected in 1976. Re-elected in 1978. Died.	1969–1983; Catron, Chaves, Curry, De Baca, Doña Ana, Eddy, Grant, Hidalgo, Lea, Lincoln, Luna, McKinley, Otero, Roosevelt, San Juan, Sierra, Socorro, and Valencia
Vacant		August 5, 1980 – January 3, 1981	96th		1969–1983; Catron, Chaves, Curry, De Baca, Doña Ana, Eddy, Grant, Hidalgo, Lea, Lincoln, Luna, McKinley, Otero, Roosevelt, San Juan, Sierra, Socorro, and Valencia
Joe Skeen (Picacho)	Republican	January 3, 1981 – January 3, 2003	97th 98th 99th 100th 101st 102nd 103rd 104th 105th 106th 107th	Elected in 1980. Re-elected in 1982. Re-elected in 1984. Re-elected in 1986. Re-elected in 1988. Re-elected in 1990. Re-elected in 1992. Re-elected in 1994. Re-elected in 1996. Re-elected in 1998. Re-elected in 2000. Retired.	1969–1983; Catron, Chaves, Curry, De Baca, Doña Ana, Eddy, Grant, Hidalgo, Lea, Lincoln, Luna, McKinley, Otero, Roosevelt, San Juan, Sierra, Socorro, and Valencia
Joe Skeen (Picacho)	Republican	January 3, 1981 – January 3, 2003	97th 98th 99th 100th 101st 102nd 103rd 104th 105th 106th 107th	Elected in 1980. Re-elected in 1982. Re-elected in 1984. Re-elected in 1986. Re-elected in 1988. Re-elected in 1990. Re-elected in 1992. Re-elected in 1994. Re-elected in 1996. Re-elected in 1998. Re-elected in 2000. Retired.	1983–1993 [data missing]
Joe Skeen (Picacho)	Republican	January 3, 1981 – January 3, 2003	97th 98th 99th 100th 101st 102nd 103rd 104th 105th 106th 107th	Elected in 1980. Re-elected in 1982. Re-elected in 1984. Re-elected in 1986. Re-elected in 1988. Re-elected in 1990. Re-elected in 1992. Re-elected in 1994. Re-elected in 1996. Re-elected in 1998. Re-elected in 2000. Retired.	1993–2003; Bernalillo, Catron, Chaves, Cibola, De Baca, Doña Ana, Eddy, Grant, Guadalupe, Hidalgo, Lea, Lincoln, Luna, Otero, Sierra, Socorro, and Valencia
Steve Pearce (Hobbs)	Republican	January 3, 2003 – January 3, 2009	108th 109th 110th	Elected in 2002. Re-elected in 2004. Re-elected in 2006. Retired to run for U.S. senator.	2003–2013 Bernalillo, Catron, Chaves, Cibola, De Baca, Doña Ana, Eddy, Grant, Guadalupe, Hidalgo, Lea, Lincoln, Luna, McKinley, Otero, Sierra, Socorro, and Valencia
Harry Teague (Hobbs)	Democratic	January 3, 2009 – January 3, 2011	111th	Elected in 2008. Lost re-election.	2003–2013 Bernalillo, Catron, Chaves, Cibola, De Baca, Doña Ana, Eddy, Grant, Guadalupe, Hidalgo, Lea, Lincoln, Luna, McKinley, Otero, Sierra, Socorro, and Valencia
Steve Pearce (Hobbs)	Republican	January 3, 2011 – January 3, 2019	112th 113th 114th 115th	Elected in 2010. Re-elected in 2012. Re-elected in 2014. Re-elected in 2016. Retired to run for Governor of New Mexico.	2003–2013 Bernalillo, Catron, Chaves, Cibola, De Baca, Doña Ana, Eddy, Grant, Guadalupe, Hidalgo, Lea, Lincoln, Luna, McKinley, Otero, Sierra, Socorro, and Valencia
Steve Pearce (Hobbs)	Republican	January 3, 2011 – January 3, 2019	112th 113th 114th 115th	Elected in 2010. Re-elected in 2012. Re-elected in 2014. Re-elected in 2016. Retired to run for Governor of New Mexico.	2013–2023 Bernalillo, Catron, Chaves, Cibola, De Baca, Doña Ana, Eddy, Grant, Guadalupe, Hidalgo, Lea, Lincoln, Luna, McKinley, Otero, Roosevelt, Sierra, Socorro, and Valencia
Xochitl Torres Small (Las Cruces)	Democratic	January 3, 2019 – January 3, 2021	116th	Elected in 2018. Lost re-election.	2013–2023 Bernalillo, Catron, Chaves, Cibola, De Baca, Doña Ana, Eddy, Grant, Guadalupe, Hidalgo, Lea, Lincoln, Luna, McKinley, Otero, Roosevelt, Sierra, Socorro, and Valencia
Yvette Herrell (Alamogordo)	Republican	January 3, 2021 – January 3, 2023	117th	Elected in 2020. Lost re-election.	2013–2023 Bernalillo, Catron, Chaves, Cibola, De Baca, Doña Ana, Eddy, Grant, Guadalupe, Hidalgo, Lea, Lincoln, Luna, McKinley, Otero, Roosevelt, Sierra, Socorro, and Valencia
Gabe Vasquez (Las Cruces)	Democratic	January 3, 2023 – present	118th 119th	Elected in 2022. Re-elected in 2024. Re-elected in 2026.	2023–present Bernalillo, Catron, Cibola, Doña Ana, Eddy, Grant, Hidalgo, Lea, Lincoln, Luna, McKinley, Otero, Sierra, Socorro, and Valencia

== Election results ==
=== 1968 ===
1968 United States House of Representatives elections in New Mexico: District 2
Party	Candidate	Votes	%
Republican	Ed Foreman	71,857	50.48
Democratic	E. S. Johnny Walker	69,858	49.08
Independent	Wilfredo Sedillo	633	0.44
Total votes		142,348	100.0
Republican win (new seat)			

=== 1970 ===
1970 United States House of Representatives elections in New Mexico: District 2
Party	Candidate	Votes	%
Democratic	Harold L. Runnels	64,518	51.37
Republican	Ed Foreman (incumbent)	61,074	48.63
Total votes		125,592	100.0
Democratic gain from Republican			

=== 1972 ===
1972 United States House of Representatives elections in New Mexico: District 2
Party	Candidate	Votes	%
Democratic	Harold L. Runnels (incumbent)	116,152	72.17
Republican	George E. Presson	44,784	27.83
Total votes		160,936	100.0
Democratic hold			

=== 1974 ===
1974 United States House of Representatives elections in New Mexico: District 2
Party	Candidate	Votes	%
Democratic	Harold L. Runnels (incumbent)	90,127	66.74
Republican	Donald W. Trubey	43,045	31.88
American Independent	Herbert Horton	1,860	1.38
Total votes		135,032	100.0
Democratic hold			

=== 1976 ===
1976 United States House of Representatives elections in New Mexico: District 2
Party	Candidate	Votes	%
Democratic	Harold L. Runnels (incumbent)	123,563	70.33
Republican	Donald W. Trubey	52,131	29.67
Total votes		175,694	100.0
Democratic hold			

=== 1978 ===
1978 United States House of Representatives elections in New Mexico: District 2
Party	Candidate	Votes	%
Democratic	Harold L. Runnels (incumbent)	95,710	100.00
Total votes		95,710	100.0
Democratic hold			

=== 1980 ===
1980 United States House of Representatives elections in New Mexico: District 2
Party	Candidate	Votes	%
Republican	Joe Skeen (as a write-in)	61,564	38.00
Democratic	David King	55,085	34.00
Independent	Dorothy Runnels (as a write-in)	45,343	28.00
Total votes		161,992	100.0
Republican gain from Democratic			

=== 1982 ===
1982 United States House of Representatives elections in New Mexico: District 2
Party	Candidate	Votes	%
Republican	Joe Skeen (incumbent)	71,021	58.40
Democratic	Caleb Chandler	50,599	41.60
Total votes		121,620	100.0
Republican hold			

=== 1984 ===
1984 United States House of Representatives elections in New Mexico: District 2
Party	Candidate	Votes	%
Republican	Joe Skeen (incumbent)	116,006	74.33
Democratic	Peter R. York	40,063	25.67
Total votes		156,069	100.0
Republican hold			

=== 1986 ===
1986 United States House of Representatives elections in New Mexico: District 2
Party	Candidate	Votes	%
Republican	Joe Skeen (incumbent)	77,787	62.88
Democratic	Mike Runnels	45,924	37.12
Total votes		123,711	100.0
Republican hold			

=== 1988 ===
1988 United States House of Representatives elections in New Mexico: District 2
Party	Candidate	Votes	%
Republican	Joe Skeen (incumbent)	100,324	100.00
Total votes		100,324	100.0
Republican hold			

=== 1990 ===
1990 United States House of Representatives elections in New Mexico: District 2
Party	Candidate	Votes	%
Republican	Joe Skeen (incumbent)	80,677	100.00
Total votes		80,677	100.0
Republican hold			

=== 1992 ===
1992 United States House of Representatives elections in New Mexico: District 2
Party	Candidate	Votes	%
Republican	Joe Skeen (incumbent)	94,838	56.39
Democratic	Dan Sosa Jr.	73,157	43.50
Write-in		175	0.11
Total votes		168,170	100.0
Republican hold			

=== 1994 ===
1994 United States House of Representatives elections in New Mexico: District 2
Party	Candidate	Votes	%
Republican	Joe Skeen (incumbent)	89,966	63.28
Democratic	Benjamin Anthony Chavez	45,316	31.87
Green	Rex R. Johnson	6,898	4.85
Total votes		142,180	100.0
Republican hold			

=== 1996 ===
1996 United States House of Representatives elections in New Mexico: District 2
Party	Candidate	Votes	%
Republican	Joe Skeen (incumbent)	95,091	55.93
Democratic	E. Shirley Baca	74,915	44.07
Total votes		170,006	100.0
Republican hold			

=== 1998 ===
1998 United States House of Representatives elections in New Mexico: District 2
Party	Candidate	Votes	%
Republican	Joe Skeen (incumbent)	85,077	57.93
Democratic	E. Shirley Baca	61,796	42.07
Total votes		146,873	100.0
Republican hold			

=== 2000 ===
2000 United States House of Representatives elections in New Mexico: District 2
Party	Candidate	Votes	%
Republican	Joe Skeen (incumbent)	100,742	58.11
Democratic	Michael A. Montoya	72,614	41.89
Total votes		173,356	100.0
Republican hold			

=== 2002 ===
2002 United States House of Representatives elections in New Mexico: District 2
Party	Candidate	Votes	%
Republican	Steve Pearce	79,631	56.23
Democratic	John Arthur Smith	61,916	43.72
Green	George L. Dewey (as a write-in)	43	0.03
Republican	Padraig M. Lynch (as a write-in)	39	0.02
Total votes		141,629	100.0
Republican hold			

=== 2004 ===
2004 United States House of Representatives elections in New Mexico: District 2
Party	Candidate	Votes	%
Republican	Steve Pearce (incumbent)	130,498	60.20
Democratic	Gary King	86,292	39.80
Total votes		216,790	100.0
Republican hold			

=== 2006 ===
2006 United States House of Representatives elections in New Mexico: District 2
Party	Candidate	Votes	%
Republican	Steve Pearce (incumbent)	92,620	59.42
Democratic	Albert Kissling	63,119	40.49
Democratic	C. Dean Burk (as a write-in)	135	0.09
Total votes		155,874	100.0
Republican hold			

=== 2008 ===
2008 United States House of Representatives elections in New Mexico: District 2
Party	Candidate	Votes	%
Democratic	Harry Teague	129,572	55.96
Republican	Edward R. Tinsley	101,980	44.04
Total votes		231,552	100.0
Democratic gain from Republican			

=== 2010 ===
2010 United States House of Representatives elections in New Mexico: District 2
Party	Candidate	Votes	%
Republican	Steve Pearce	94,053	55.40
Democratic	Harry Teague (incumbent)	75,709	44.60
Total votes		169,762	100.0
Republican gain from Democratic			

=== 2012 ===
2012 United States House of Representatives elections in New Mexico: District 2
Party	Candidate	Votes	%
Republican	Steve Pearce (incumbent)	133,180	59.06
Democratic	Evelyn Madrid Erhard	92,162	40.87
Independent	Jack A. McGrann (Write-In)	173	0.08
Total votes		225,515	100.0
Republican hold			

=== 2014 ===
2014 United States House of Representatives elections in New Mexico: District 2
Party	Candidate	Votes	%
Republican	Steve Pearce (incumbent)	95,209	64.43
Democratic	Rocky Lara	52,499	35.52
Republican	Jack McGrann (Write-In)	69	0.05
Total votes		147,777	100
Republican hold			

=== 2016 ===
2016 United States House of Representatives elections in New Mexico: District 2
Party	Candidate	Votes	%
Republican	Steve Pearce (incumbent)	143,514	62.72
Democratic	Merrie Lee Soules	85,232	37.25
Republican	Jack A McGrann (write in)	70	0.03
Total votes		228,816	100
Republican hold			

=== 2018 ===
2018 United States House of Representatives elections in New Mexico: District 2
Party	Candidate	Votes	%
Democratic	Xochitl Torres Small	101,489	50.90
Republican	Yvette Herrell	97,767	49.10
Total votes		199,256	100.0
Democratic gain from Republican			

=== 2020 ===
2020 United States House of Representatives elections in New Mexico: District 2
Party	Candidate	Votes	%
Republican	Yvette Herrell	142,169	53.75
Democratic	Xochitl Torres Small (incumbent)	122,314	46.25
Total votes		264,483	100.0
Republican gain from Democratic			

=== 2022 ===
2022 United States House of Representatives elections in New Mexico: District 2
Party	Candidate	Votes	%
Democratic	Gabe Vasquez	96,986	50.34
Republican	Yvette Herrell (incumbent)	95,636	49.64
Democratic	Eliseo Luna (write-in)	51	0.03
Total votes		192,673	100.00
Democratic gain from Republican			

=== 2024 ===
2024 United States House of Representatives elections in New Mexico: District 2
Party	Candidate	Votes	%
Democratic	Gabe Vasquez (incumbent)	138,177	52.08
Republican	Yvette Herrell	127,145	47.92
Total votes		265,322	100.00
Democratic hold			

== See also ==
- New Mexico's congressional districts
- List of United States congressional districts
