= 1928 United States House of Representatives elections in New Mexico =

1928 United States House election in New Mexico
- November 6, 1928
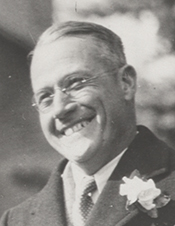

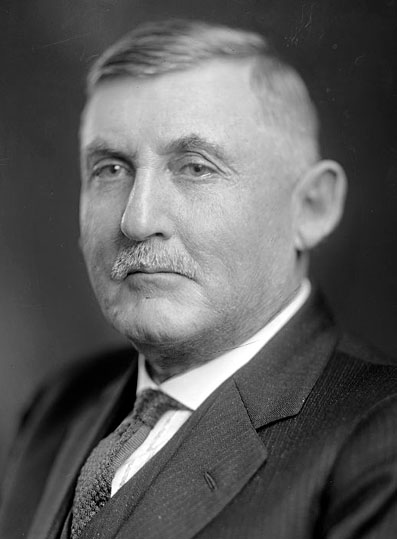
Nominee	Albert G. Simms	John Morrow
Party	Republican	Democratic
Popular vote	61,208	56,048
Percentage	52.2%	47.8%
- County results Simms: 50–60% 60–70% 70–80% Morrow: 50–60% 60–70% 70–80%
Representative
At-large before election
John Morrow
Democratic
Elected Representative
At-large
Albert G. Simms
Republican

The 1928 United States House of Representatives election in New Mexico was held on November 6, 1928, to elect the state's at large representative. This election coincided with the presidential election and the state's Governor election. Albert G. Simms defeated incumbent John Morrow by a margin of 4.4%.

This would be the last time a republican would win a congressional district in New Mexico until 1968.

== Results ==
New Mexico At-large congressional district election, 1928
Party	Candidate	Votes	%
Republican	Albert G. Simms	61,208	52.20
Democratic	John Morrow (incumbent)	56,048	47.80
Total votes		117,256	100.00
Republican gain from Democratic			
