= 1976 United States House of Representatives elections in New Mexico =

- November 2, 1976

All 2 New Mexico seats to the United States House of Representatives
	Majority party	Minority party
Party	Republican	Democratic
Last election	1	1
Seats won	1	1
Seat change	Steady	Steady
Popular vote	214,718	185,363
Percentage	53.5%	46.2%
Swing	▲6.2%	▼5.0%

The 1976 United States House of Representatives election in New Mexico was held on Tuesday November 2, 1976 to elect the state's two representatives to serve in the 95th United States Congress.

Both districts retained their partisan control, with the Democrats retaining the 2nd district and Republicans holding on to the 1st district. This made the state's delegation remain evenly split, as it had been since 1970.

== Overview ==
United States House of Representatives elections in New Mexico, 1974
Party	Votes	Percentage	Seats	+/–
Democratic	214,718	53.51%	1	—
Republican	185,363	46.20%	1	—
Raza Unida Party	1,159	0.29%	0	—
Totals	401,240	100.00%	2	—

== District 1 ==
New Mexico's 1st congressional district election, 1974
Party	Candidate	Votes	%
Republican	Manuel Lujan Jr. (incumbent)	162,587	72.09
Democratic	Raymond Garcia	61,800	27.40
Raza Unida	Martin Molloy	1,159	0.51
Total votes		225,546	100.00
Republican hold			

== District 2 ==
New Mexico's 2nd congressional district election, 1974
Party	Candidate	Votes	%
Democratic	Harold L. Runnels (incumbent)	123,563	70.33
Republican	Donald W. Trubey	52,131	29.67
Total votes		175,694	100.00
Democratic hold			
