= Steven Schiff =

American politician (1947–1998)

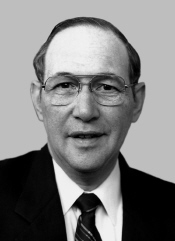

Member of the U.S. House of Representatives from New Mexico's 1st district
- In office January 3, 1989 – March 25, 1998
- Preceded by: Manuel Lujan, Jr.
- Succeeded by: Heather Wilson

Personal details
- Born: Steven Harvey Schiff; March 18, 1947 Chicago, Illinois, U.S.
- Died: March 25, 1998 (aged 51) Albuquerque, New Mexico, U.S.
- Party: Republican
- Education: University of Illinois at Urbana–Champaign; University of New Mexico School of Law
- Occupation: Lawyer

Steven Harvey Schiff (March 18, 1947 – March 25, 1998) was an American politician and lawyer. A member of the Republican Party, Schiff served as a U.S. representative from New Mexico's 1st congressional district from 1989 until his death in 1998.

Schiff was born in Chicago, Illinois. He received a B.A. from the University of Illinois and a Juris Doctor from the University of New Mexico School of Law. Schiff joined the New Mexico Air National Guard in 1969 and remained a reservist until his death. After completing law school, Schiff stayed in New Mexico and practiced law. From 1972 until 1981, Schiff was an assistant city attorney for Albuquerque. He was the district attorney for Bernalillo County from 1981 until his election to Congress.

Schiff first ran for Congress in 1988, as the 20-year incumbent, Republican Manuel Lujan Jr., was retiring. Schiff narrowly defeated Democrat Tom Udall, a future U.S. Senator, by a margin of 51%–47%. This was Schiff's closest race; he won reelection by at least 15 points in 1990, 1992, 1994, and 1996.

Schiff had an interest in UFOs, and while in Congress, he pressured various government officials for information about them.

Schiff died in Albuquerque of squamous-cell carcinoma of the skin during his fifth term in Congress. Republican Heather Wilson won a special election to succeed him.

== See also ==
- List of Jewish members of the United States Congress
- List of members of the United States Congress who died in office (1950–1999)

U.S. House of Representatives
Preceded by Manuel Lujan Jr.	Member of the U.S. House of Representatives from New Mexico's 1st congressional district January 3, 1989 – March 25, 1998	Succeeded by Heather Wilson
