= 2016 United States House of Representatives elections in New Mexico =

- November 8, 2016

All 3 New Mexico seats to the United States House of Representatives
| | Majority party | Minority party |
|---|---|---|
| Party | Democratic | Republican |
| Last election | 2 | 1 |
| Seats won | 2 | 1 |
| Seat change | Steady | Steady |
| Popular vote | 436,932 | 343,193 |
| Percentage | 56.01% | 43.99% |
| Swing | ▲3.03% | ▼3.03% |

Democratic
50–60%
60–70%
70–80%
80–90%
Republican
50–60%
60–70%
70–80%
80–90%

The 2016 United States House of Representatives elections in New Mexico were held on November 8, 2016, to elect the three U.S. representatives from the state of New Mexico, one from each of the state's three congressional districts. The elections coincided with the 2016 U.S. presidential election, as well as other elections to the House of Representatives, elections to the United States Senate and various state and local elections. The primaries were held on June 7. All three incumbent representatives were re-elected in the general election.

== Overview ==
| District | Democratic | | Republican | | Others | | Total | | Result |
| District | Votes | % | Votes | % | Votes | % | Votes | % | Result |
|---|---|---|---|---|---|---|---|---|---|
| District 1 | 181,088 | 65.15% | 96,879 | 34.85% | 0 | 0.00% | 277,967 | 100.00% | Democratic hold |
| District 2 | 85,232 | 37.25% | 143,514 | 62.72% | 70 | 0.03% | 228,816 | 100.00% | Republican hold |
| District 3 | 170,612 | 62.42% | 102,730 | 37.58% | 0 | 0.00% | 273,342 | 100.00% | Democratic hold |
| Total | 436,932 | 56.01% | 343,123 | 43.98% | 70 | 0.01% | 780,125 | 100.00% | |

== District 1 ==
2016 New Mexico's 1st congressional district election
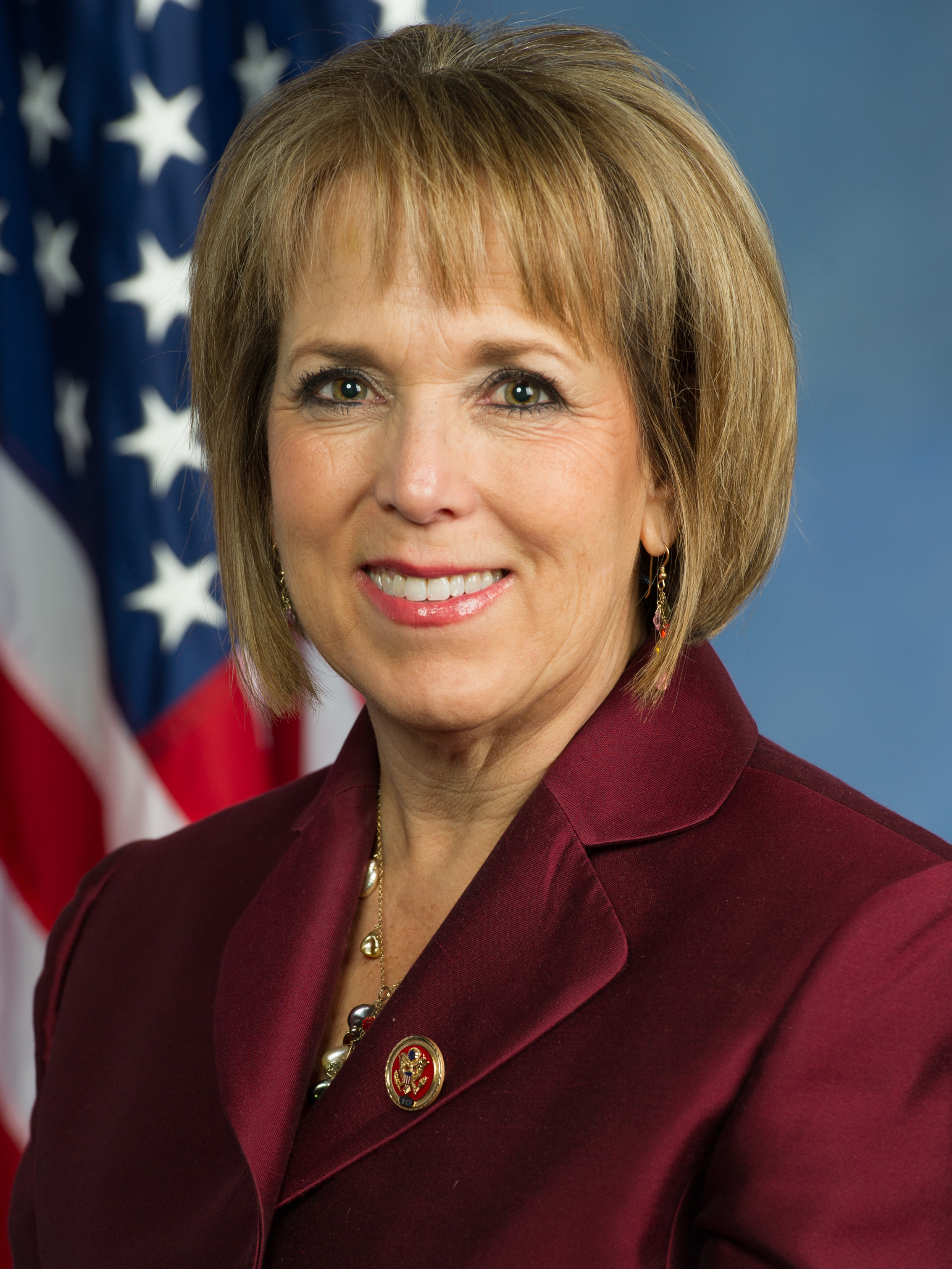

| Nominee | Michelle Lujan Grisham | Richard Priem |
| Party | Democratic | Republican |
| Popular vote | 181,088 | 96,879 |
| Percentage | 65.2% | 34.8% |
- Precinct results Lujan Grisham: 50–60% 60–70% 70–80% 80–90% >90% Priem: 50–60% 60–70% 70–80% No votes
U.S. Representative before election
Michelle Lujan Grisham
Democratic
Elected U.S. Representative
Michelle Lujan Grisham
Democratic

The 1st district includes the central area of New Mexico, including almost three-fourths of Albuquerque. Incumbent Democrat Michelle Lujan Grisham, who had represented the district since 2013, ran for re-election. She was re-elected with 59% of the vote in 2014. The district had a PVI of D+7.

=== Democratic primary ===
==== Candidates ====
===== Nominee =====
- Michelle Lujan Grisham, incumbent U.S. Representative

==== Results ====
Democratic primary results
| Party | Candidate | Votes | % |
|---|---|---|---|
| Democratic | Michelle Lujan Grisham (incumbent) | 69,216 | 100.0 |
| Total votes | | 69,216 | 100.0 |

=== Republican primary ===
==== Candidates ====
===== Nominee =====
- Richard Priem, businessman and candidate for this seat in 2014

==== Results ====
Republican primary results
| Party | Candidate | Votes | % |
|---|---|---|---|
| Republican | Richard Gregory Priem | 27,973 | 100.0 |
| Total votes | | 27,973 | 100.0 |

=== General election ===
==== Predictions ====
| Source | Ranking | As of |
|---|---|---|
| The Cook Political Report | Safe D | November 7, 2016 |
| Daily Kos Elections | Safe D | November 7, 2016 |
| Rothenberg | Safe D | November 3, 2016 |
| Sabato's Crystal Ball | Safe D | November 7, 2016 |
| RCP | Safe D | October 31, 2016 |

==== Results ====
New Mexico's 1st congressional district, 2016
| Party | Candidate | Votes | % |
|---|---|---|---|
| Democratic | Michelle Lujan Grisham (incumbent) | 181,088 | 65.2 |
| Republican | Richard Gregory Priem | 96,879 | 34.8 |
| Total votes | | 277,967 | 100.0 |
| Democratic hold | | | |

== District 2 ==
2016 New Mexico's 2nd congressional district election
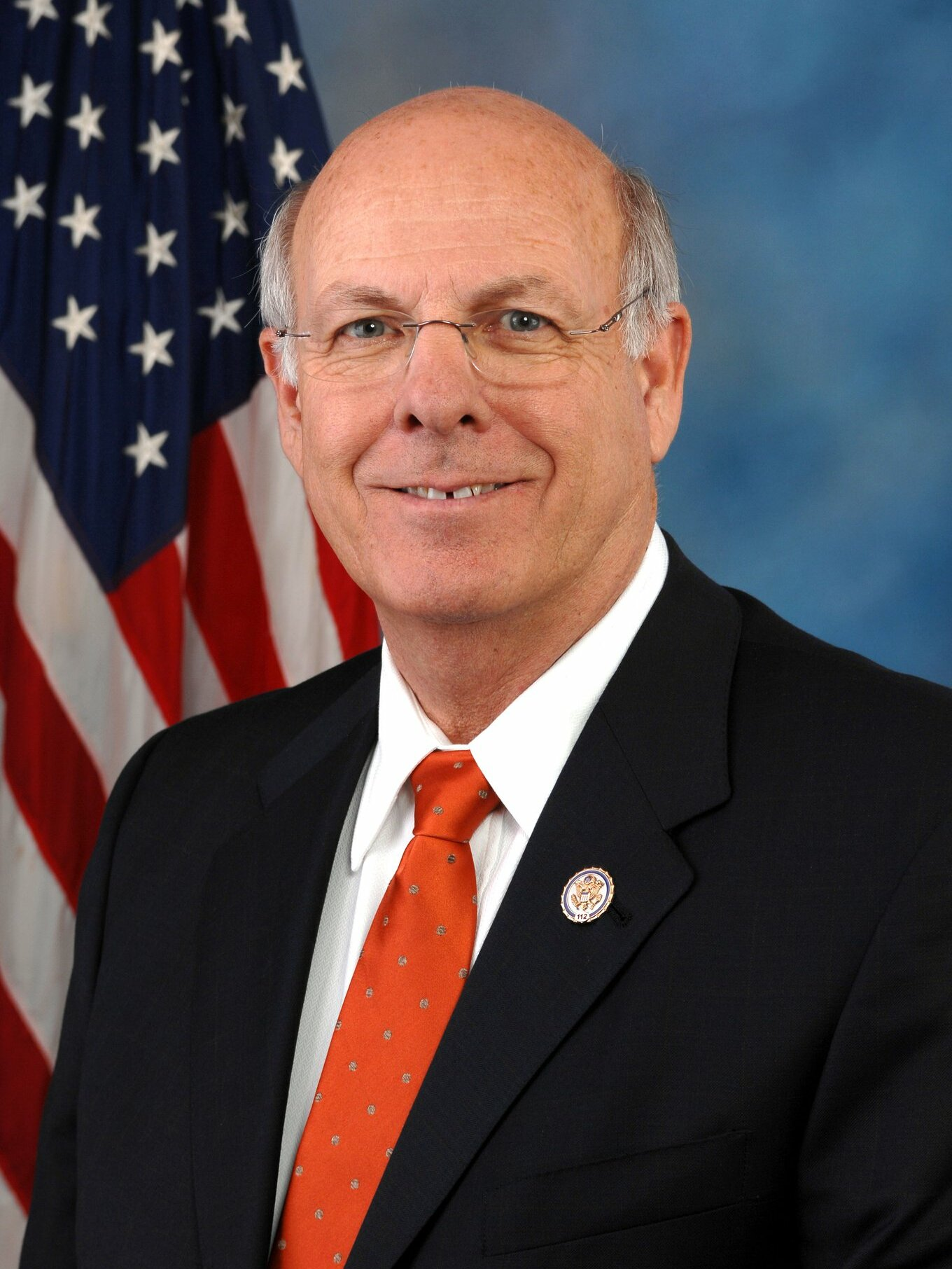

| Nominee | Steve Pearce | Merrie Lee Soules |
| Party | Republican | Democratic |
| Popular vote | 143,514 | 85,232 |
| Percentage | 62.7% | 37.3% |
- Precinct results Pearce: 50–60% 60–70% 70–80% 80–90% >90% Lee Soules: 50–60% 60–70% 70–80% Tie: 50% No votes
U.S. Representative before election
Steve Pearce
Republican
Elected U.S. Representative
Steve Pearce
Republican

The 2nd district includes the southern half of New Mexico, including Las Cruces, Roswell and the southern fourth of Albuquerque. Geographically, it is the sixth largest district in the nation and the 2nd-largest not to comprise an entire state (after Nevada's 2nd district). Incumbent Republican Steve Pearce, who had represented the district since 2011, having previously served between 2003 and 2009, ran for re-election. He was re-elected with 64% of the vote in 2014. The district had a PVI of R+5.

=== Republican primary ===
==== Candidates ====
===== Nominee =====
- Steve Pearce, incumbent U.S. Representative

==== Results ====
Republican primary results
| Party | Candidate | Votes | % |
|---|---|---|---|
| Republican | Steve Pearce (incumbent) | 36,722 | 100.0 |
| Total votes | | 36,722 | 100.0 |

=== Democratic primary ===
==== Candidates ====
===== Nominee =====
- Merrie Lee Soules, engineer and candidate for Public Regulation Commission in 2014

==== Results ====
Democratic primary results
| Party | Candidate | Votes | % |
|---|---|---|---|
| Democratic | Merrie Lee Soules | 37,455 | 100.0 |
| Total votes | | 37,455 | 100.0 |

=== General election ===
==== Debates ====
2016 New Mexico's 2nd congressional district debate
| No. | Date | Host | Moderator | Link | Republican | Democratic |
| Key: P Participant A Absent N Not invited I Invited W Withdrawn | | | | | | |
| Key: P Participant A Absent N Not invited I Invited W Withdrawn | | | | | Steve Pearce | Merrie Lee Soules |
|---|---|---|---|---|---|---|
| 1 | Oct. 27, 2016 | KRWG-TV; Las Cruces Sun-News | Fred Martino | | P | P |

==== Predictions ====
| Source | Ranking | As of |
|---|---|---|
| The Cook Political Report | Safe R | November 7, 2016 |
| Daily Kos Elections | Safe R | November 7, 2016 |
| Rothenberg | Safe R | November 3, 2016 |
| Sabato's Crystal Ball | Safe R | November 7, 2016 |
| RCP | Safe R | October 31, 2016 |

==== Results ====
New Mexico's 2nd congressional district, 2016
| Party | Candidate | Votes | % |
|---|---|---|---|
| Republican | Steve Pearce (incumbent) | 143,515 | 62.7 |
| Democratic | Merrie Lee Soules | 85,232 | 37.3 |
| Republican | Jack A. McGrann (write-in) | 70 | 0.0 |
| Total votes | | 228,817 | 100.0 |
| Republican hold | | | |

== District 3 ==
2016 New Mexico's 3rd congressional district election
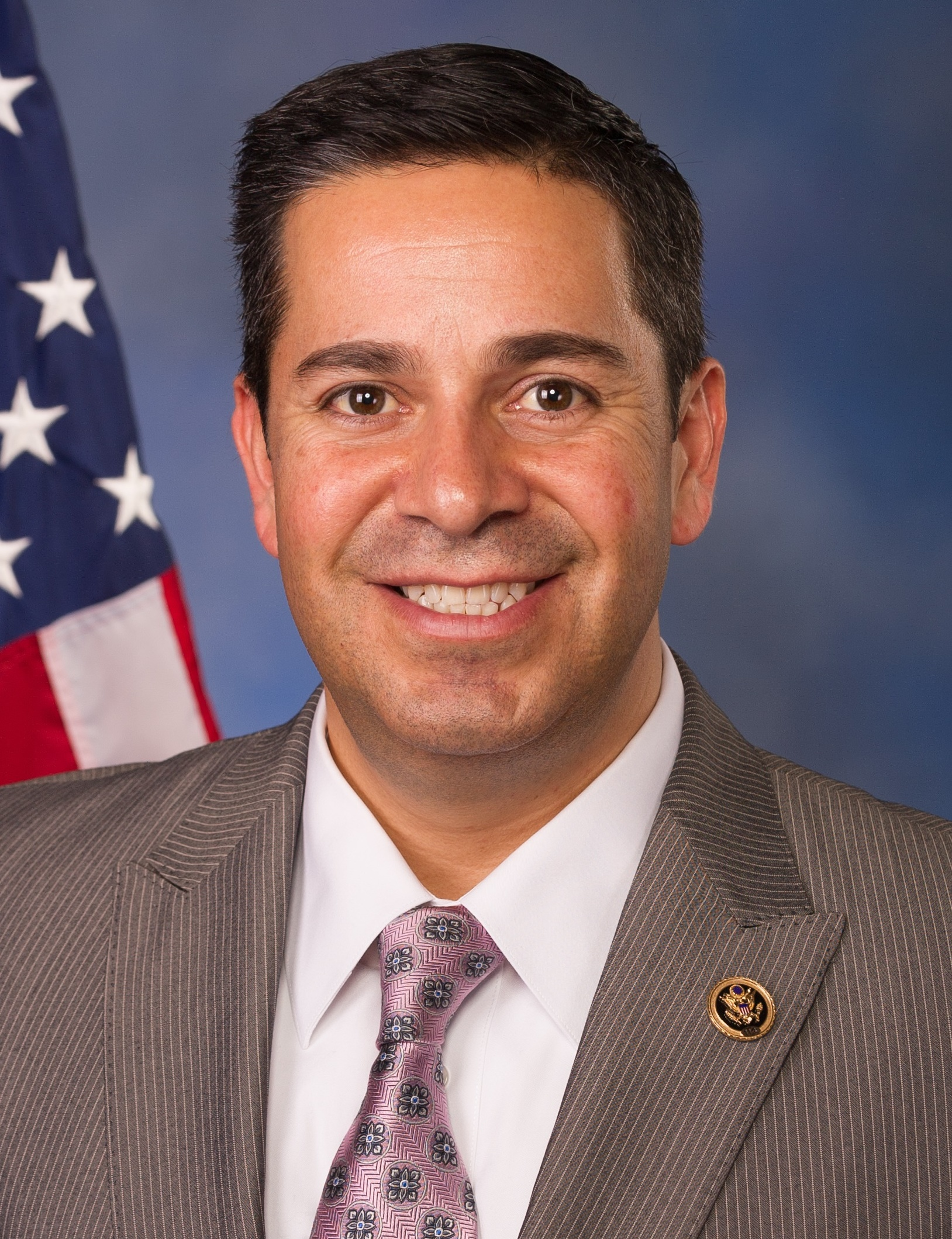

| Nominee | Ben Ray Luján | Michael Romero |
| Party | Democratic | Republican |
| Popular vote | 170,612 | 102,730 |
| Percentage | 62.4% | 37.6% |
- Precinct results Luján: 50–60% 60–70% 70–80% 80–90% >90% Romero: 50–60% 60–70% 70–80% 80–90% >90% Tie: 50% No votes
U.S. Representative before election
Ben Ray Luján
Democratic
Elected U.S. Representative
Ben Ray Luján
Democratic

The 3rd district the northern half of New Mexico, including the state's Capital, Santa Fe. Incumbent Democrat Ben R. Luján, who has represented the district since 2009, ran for re-election. He was re-elected with 62% of the vote in 2014 and the district had a PVI of D+8.

=== Democratic primary ===
==== Candidates ====
===== Nominee =====
- Ben R. Luján, incumbent U.S. Representative

==== Results ====
Democratic primary results
| Party | Candidate | Votes | % |
|---|---|---|---|
| Democratic | Ben Ray Luján (incumbent) | 76,789 | 100.0 |
| Total votes | | 76,789 | 100.0 |

=== Republican primary ===
==== Candidates ====
===== Nominee =====
- Michael Romero, police officer

===== Eliminated in primary =====
- Michael Lucero, rancher

==== Results ====
Republican primary results
| Party | Candidate | Votes | % |
|---|---|---|---|
| Republican | Michael H. Romero | 17,025 | 62.0 |
| Republican | Michael Glenn Lucero | 10,419 | 38.0 |
| Total votes | | 27,444 | 100.0 |

=== General election ===
==== Predictions ====
| Source | Ranking | As of |
|---|---|---|
| The Cook Political Report | Safe D | November 7, 2016 |
| Daily Kos Elections | Safe D | November 7, 2016 |
| Rothenberg | Safe D | November 3, 2016 |
| Sabato's Crystal Ball | Safe D | November 7, 2016 |
| RCP | Safe D | October 31, 2016 |

==== Results ====
New Mexico's 3rd congressional district, 2016
| Party | Candidate | Votes | % |
|---|---|---|---|
| Democratic | Ben Ray Luján (incumbent) | 170,612 | 62.4 |
| Republican | Michael H. Romero | 102,730 | 37.6 |
| Total votes | | 273,342 | 100.0 |
| Democratic hold | | | |
