= Jefferson Byrd =

American politician

Member of the New Mexico Public Regulation Commission from the 2nd district
- In office January 1, 2019 – January 1, 2023
- Preceded by: Patrick H. Lyons
- Succeeded by: Position abolished

Personal details
- Born: June 16, 1971 (age 53); Springer, New Mexico, U.S.
- Political party: Republican
- Spouse: Suzanne
- Education: New Mexico State University (BA)

Jefferson L. Byrd (born June 16, 1971) is an American politician from New Mexico. He was an elected member of the New Mexico Public Regulation Commission from the 2nd district, which covers Chaves, Colfax, Curry, De Baca, Eddy, Guadalupe, Harding, Lea, Quay, Roosevelt, and Union Counties, and parts of Bernalillo, Lincoln, Mora, Otero, San Miguel, Santa Fe, and Torrance Counties.

== Early life and education ==
Byrd grew up on his family's ranch in Mosquero, New Mexico and attended Mosquero High School. He graduated from New Mexico State University in 1995 with a B.A. in agricultural engineering. He worked as an environmental engineer in the oil refining industry for fourteen years and owns two small businesses, including a ranch in Northern New Mexico.

== Career ==
A member of the Republican Party, Byrd ran for the U.S. House of Representatives in New Mexico's 3rd congressional district in 2012 and 2014, both times losing to incumbent Democratic Congressman Ben Ray Luján. In 2018, Byrd won the Republican nomination for Public Regulation Commissioner from the 2nd district over Jerry Partin, 54–46%. He defeated Democratic nominee Kevin Sanders 62-38% in the general election. Byrd's service on the commission ended January 1, 2023 after a constitutional amendment converting the commission from an elected to an appointed body went into effect.
