= 1974 United States House of Representatives elections in New Mexico =

- November 5, 1974

All 2 New Mexico seats to the United States House of Representatives
	Majority party	Minority party
Party	Democratic	Republican
Last election	1	1
Seats won	1	1
Seat change	Steady	Steady
Popular vote	162,095	149,313
Percentage	51.2%	47.2%
Swing	▼5.1%	▲3.5%
District results
Democratic
60–70%
Republican
50–60%

The 1974 United States House of Representatives election in New Mexico was held on Tuesday, November 5, 1974 to elect the state's two representatives to serve in the 94th United States Congress.

Both districts retained their partisan control, with the Democrats retaining the 2nd district and Republicans holding on to the 1st district. This made the state's delegation remain evenly split, as it had been since 1970.

== Overview ==
United States House of Representatives elections in New Mexico, 1974
Party	Votes	Percentage	Seats	+/–
Democratic	162,095	51.24%	1	—
Republican	149,313	47.20%	1	—
American Independent	4,929	1.56%	0	—
Totals	316,337	100.00%	2	—

== District 1 ==
New Mexico's 1st congressional district election, 1974
Party	Candidate	Votes	%
Republican	Manuel Lujan Jr. (incumbent)	106,268	58.61
Democratic	Roberto Mondragón	71,968	39.70
American Independent	Martin Molloy	3,069	1.69
Total votes		181,305	100.00
Republican hold			

== District 2 ==
New Mexico's 2nd congressional district election, 1974
Party	Candidate	Votes	%
Democratic	Harold L. Runnels (incumbent)	90,127	66.74
Republican	Donald W. Trubey	43,045	31.88
American Independent	Hub Horton	1,860	1.38
Total votes		135,032	100.00
Democratic hold			
