= 1978 New Mexico gubernatorial election =

- November 7, 1978
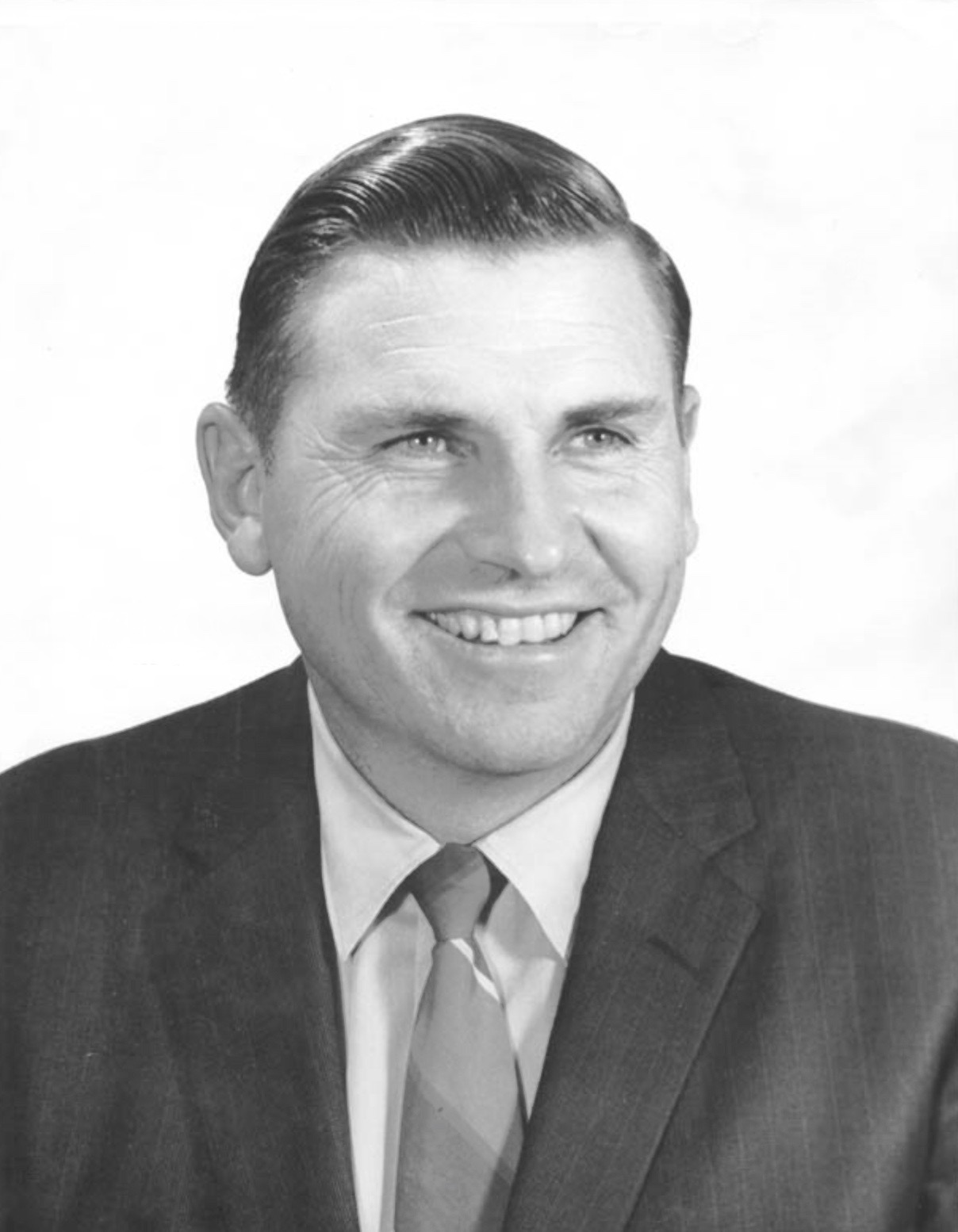

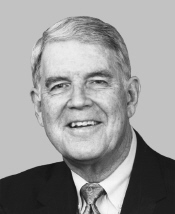
Nominee	Bruce King	Joe Skeen
Party	Democratic	Republican
Popular vote	174,631	170,848
Percentage	50.55%	49.45%
- County results King: 50–60% 60–70% Skeen: 50–60% 60–70% 70–80%
Governor before election
Jerry Apodaca
Democratic
Elected Governor
Bruce King
Democratic

The 1978 New Mexico gubernatorial election took place on November 7, 1978, in order to elect the Governor of New Mexico. Due to term limits, incumbent Democrat Jerry Apodaca was ineligible to seek a second term as governor. Bruce King, a member of the Democratic Party who had previously served as governor from 1971 to 1975, won the open seat. With a margin of victory of just 1.09%, this was the second closest contest of the 1978 cycle, behind only the election in Texas.

== Primary election ==
=== Democratic primary ===
The Democratic primary was won by former Governor Bruce King.

==== Results ====
New Mexico Democratic gubernatorial primary, 1978
Party	Candidate	Votes	%
Democratic	Bruce King	92,432	61.31%
Democratic	Robert E. Ferguson	58,334	38.69%
Total votes		150,766	100.00%

=== Republican primary ===
The Republican primary was won by former state senator Joe Skeen.

==== Results ====
New Mexico Republican gubernatorial primary, 1978
Party	Candidate	Votes	%
Republican	Joe Skeen	38,638	81.17%
Republican	Philip R. Grant	8,966	18.84%
Total votes		47,604	100.00%

== General election ==
=== Results ===
1978 New Mexico gubernatorial election
Party	Candidate	Votes	%	±%
Democratic	Bruce King	174,631	50.55%	+0.61%
Republican	Joseph R. Skeen	170,848	49.45%	−0.65%
Majority		3,783	1.10%	
Total votes		345,479	100.00%	
Democratic hold		Swing	-0.04%	

=== Results by county ===
County	Bruce King Democratic		Joe Skeen Republican		Margin		Total votes cast
County	#	%	#	%	#	%	Total votes cast
Bernalillo	55,448	48.26%	59,443	51.74%	-3,995	-3.48%	114,891
Catron	649	49.13%	672	50.87%	-23	-1.74%	1,321
Chaves	5,134	33.94%	9,991	66.06%	-4,857	-32.11%	15,125
Colfax	2,187	53.12%	1,930	46.88%	257	6.24%	4,117
Curry	4,054	48.51%	4,303	51.49%	-249	-2.98%	8,357
De Baca	521	52.31%	475	47.69%	46	4.62%	996
Doña Ana	9,539	45.12%	11,603	54.88%	-2,064	-9.76%	21,142
Eddy	7,419	54.02%	6,314	45.98%	1,105	8.05%	13,733
Grant	4,624	59.74%	3,116	40.26%	1,508	19.48%	7,740
Guadalupe	1,591	69.72%	691	30.28%	900	39.44%	2,282
Harding	259	41.77%	361	58.23%	-102	-16.45%	620
Hidalgo	766	54.36%	643	45.64%	123	8.73%	1,409
Lea	4,665	44.48%	5,824	55.52%	-1,159	-11.05%	10,489
Lincoln	1,009	29.46%	2,416	70.54%	-1,407	-41.08%	3,425
Los Alamos	2,349	32.65%	4,845	67.35%	-2,496	-34.70%	7,194
Luna	2,117	45.29%	2,557	54.71%	-440	-9.41%	4,674
McKinley	5,244	59.29%	3,600	40.71%	1,644	18.59%	8,844
Mora	1,494	62.07%	913	37.93%	581	24.14%	2,407
Otero	4,140	44.43%	5,178	55.57%	-1,038	-11.14%	9,318
Quay	1,632	47.65%	1,793	52.35%	-161	-4.70%	3,425
Rio Arriba	7,106	68.78%	3,226	31.22%	3,880	37.55%	10,332
Roosevelt	1,793	36.87%	3,070	63.13%	-1,277	-26.26%	4,863
San Juan	6,866	44.31%	8,631	55.69%	-1,765	-11.39%	15,497
San Miguel	4,729	62.29%	2,863	37.71%	1,866	24.58%	7,592
Sandoval	5,303	59.77%	3,570	40.23%	1,733	19.53%	8,873
Santa Fe	14,080	60.44%	9,217	39.56%	4,863	20.87%	23,297
Sierra	1,486	47.66%	1,632	52.34%	-146	-4.68%	3,118
Socorro	2,524	57.39%	1,874	42.61%	650	14.78%	4,398
Taos	4,418	66.07%	2,269	33.93%	2,149	32.14%	6,687
Torrance	1,858	62.06%	1,136	37.94%	722	24.11%	2,994
Union	704	41.46%	994	58.54%	-290	-17.08%	1,698
Valencia	8,923	61.03%	5,698	38.97%	3,225	22.06%	14,621
Total	174,631	50.55%	170,848	49.45%	3,783	1.10%	345,479

==== Counties that flipped from Republican to Democratic ====
- Colfax
- De Baca
- Hidalgo
- Torrance

==== Counties that flipped from Democratic to Republican ====
- Doña Ana
