= 1972 United States House of Representatives elections in New Mexico =

- November 7, 1972

All 2 New Mexico seats to the United States House of Representatives
	Majority party	Minority party
Party	Democratic	Republican
Last election	1	1
Seats won	1	1
Seat change	Steady	Steady
Popular vote	210,391	163,187
Percentage	56.3%	43.7%
Swing	▲10.4%	▼10.4%
District results
Democratic
70–80%
Republican
50–60%

The 1972 United States House of Representatives election in New Mexico was held on Tuesday November 7, 1972 to elect the state's two representatives to serve in the United States House of Representatives. This election coincided with the presidential election, and the state's concurrent senate election.

Neither seats changed partisan control. The Democrats retained control of the 2nd district, while Republicans held on to the 1st District. This kept the state delegation evenly split.

== Overview ==
United States House of Representatives elections in New Mexico, 1972
Party	Votes	Percentage	Seats	+/–
Democratic	210,391	56.32%	1	—
Totals	373,578	100.00%	2	—

== District 1 ==
New Mexico's 1st congressional district election, 1972
Party	Candidate	Votes	%
Republican	Manuel Lujan Jr. (incumbent)	118,403	55.68
Democratic	Eugene Gallegos	94,239	44.32
Total votes		212,642	100.00
Republican hold			

== District 2 ==
New Mexico's 2nd congressional district election, 1972
Party	Candidate	Votes	%
Democratic	Harold L. Runnels (incumbent)	116,152	72.17
Republican	George E. Presson	44,784	27.83
Total votes		160,936	100.00
Democratic hold			
