= Patricia A. Madrid =

American politician

Patricia Madrid

29th Attorney General of New Mexico
- In office January 1, 1999 – January 1, 2007
- Governor: Gary Johnson; Bill Richardson
- Preceded by: Tom Udall
- Succeeded by: Gary King

Personal details
- Born: 1947 (age 78–79) Las Cruces, New Mexico, U.S.
- Party: Democratic
- Education: University of New Mexico (BA, JD)

Patricia A. Madrid (born 1947) is an American politician and the former Attorney General for the U.S. state of New Mexico. She is a member of the Democratic Party. She also sits on the bipartisan advisory board of States United Democracy Center.

== Family ==
Madrid's father was descended of Pueblo Amerinds. Her other ancestry include Irish, German and Hispanos of New Mexico.

== Political career ==
Madrid won her first campaign in 1978 when she became the first woman elected to sit as a district court judge in New Mexico. In 1994, she was the Democratic nominee for Lieutenant Governor of New Mexico as Governor Bruce King's running mate, but lost the general election. In 1998, she became the first woman elected Attorney General of the State of New Mexico. She was re-elected in 2002.

In 2005, Madrid became the chairperson of the Conference of Western Attorneys General, which focuses on energy, environmental, and Indian gaming issues.

Madrid was term limited from seeking reelection in 2006. She chose instead to run for U.S. Representative in New Mexico's 1st congressional district. She lost to Republican incumbent Heather Wilson by 875 (out of 211,000) votes. When it appeared that Senator Pete Domenici was going to run for re-election in 2008, a Wilson-Madrid rematch was considered a strong possibility, especially considering Wilson's role in the firing of US Attorney for New Mexico David Iglesias. But Domenici's poll numbers dropped as a result of the scandal, and Madrid may have considered running against him. When Domenici announced his retirement from the Senate and Wilson announced her candidacy for the open Senate seat, it appeared Madrid may have been facing a rematch with Wilson on the statewide level. When Democratic Representative Tom Udall entered the race, Madrid opted against running for the U.S. Senate.

== Notable actions as Attorney General ==
- Established a Capital Litigation Unit to provide assistance to district attorneys statewide prosecuting violent crimes and death penalty cases.
- Introduced New Mexico's first state-level Crime Victim's Services Unit.
- Established the Violence Against Women unit, which received a grant for over $560,000 to provide training for first responders to domestic violence incidents in rural New Mexico.
- Established the Internet Crimes Against Children Task Force.
- Convicted a number of individuals for the illegal dumping of rendering plant waste near irrigation ditches in violation of the state's Water Quality Act.
- Helped found the Endangered Species Act Work Group, which brings together farmers and municipalities, federal, state and environmental interests.
- Ruled against the legality of the county clerk of Sandoval County issuing marriage licenses to same-sex couples.

== Awards and recognitions ==
- Hispanic National Bar Association Latina Lawyer of the Year
- Mothers Against Drunk Driving Annual Award for Elected Officials
- New Mexico's Commission on the Status of Women Trailblazer Award
- Capital Business and Professional Women of Santa Fe Woman of the Year in Government Award
- Animal Protection of New Mexico 2004 Milagro Executive Director’s Award
- New Mexico Business Weekly three time New Mexico Power Broker

== See also ==
- List of female state attorneys general in the United States
- List of first women lawyers and judges in New Mexico
- List of Hispanic and Latino American jurists

Legal offices
Preceded by Tom Udall	Attorney General of New Mexico; January 1, 1999 – January 1, 2007	Succeeded by Gary King
