= Joe Skeen =

American politician (1927–2003)

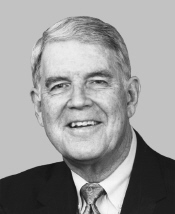

Member of the U.S. House of Representatives from New Mexico's 2nd district
- In office January 3, 1981 – January 3, 2003
- Preceded by: Harold L. Runnels
- Succeeded by: Steve Pearce

Chair of the Republican Party of New Mexico
- In office 1962–1965

Member of the New Mexico Senate
- In office 1960–1970

Personal details
- Born: June 30, 1927 Roswell, New Mexico, U.S.
- Died: December 7, 2003 (aged 76) Roswell, New Mexico, U.S.
- Party: Republican
- Education: Texas A&M University
- Occupation: rancher, politician

Military service
- Allegiance: United States
- Years of service: 1945–1946
- Battles/wars: World War II

Joseph Richard Skeen (June 30, 1927 – December 7, 2003) was an American politician who served as a congressman from southern New Mexico. A conservative Republican, he served for eleven terms in the United States House of Representatives between 1981 and 2003.

== Early life and education ==
Skeen was born in Roswell, New Mexico. During his teenage years, his family moved to Seattle. During the final year of World War II, Skeen entered the United States Navy. After returning home, he graduated from Texas A&M University in College Station, Texas.

== 1980 congressional election ==
Incumbent Five-term Democratic Congressman Harold Runnels was renominated in the Democratic primary and was set to be unopposed in the general election, after the Republican party failed to nominate any candidate. Runnels suddenly died of cancer on August 5, 1980, at the age of fifty-six. The state attorney general published an advisory opinion that the Democrats could replace Runnels on the ballot, as he had been nominated in the primary, but Republicans could not, as no candidate had filed in the preceding primary election. Republicans coalesced behind a write-in effort by Skeen, while the Democrats selected Governor Bruce King's nephew, David King, over Runnels' widow, Dorothy Runnels. Runnels decided to run her own write-in campaign after failing to be selected by the Democratic Party. Skeen was elected with 61,564 votes (38 percent) to King's 55,085 (34 percent), and Runnels' 45,343 (28 percent). He was helped by the splitting of the Democratic vote between King and Runnels, as well as Ronald Reagan carrying the district. Skeen was only the third person in U.S. history to be elected to Congress as a write-in candidate.

As a congressman, Skeen had a largely conservative voting record but also brought numerous projects to his district. In contrast to most congressmen, Skeen faced several competitive races for reelection. After skating to reelection from 1982 to 1990, including two completely unopposed bids in 1988 and 1990, he faced aggressive Democratic challenges for most of the 1990s.

He announced in 1997 that he had Parkinson's disease. Skeen announced his retirement from Congress in 2002 and left at the end of his 11th term in 2003. At the time of his death in 2003, he was highly regarded by New Mexicans in both parties for his service to his state.

On October 10, 2002, Skeen voted in favor of authorizing the invasion of Iraq.

== Namesakes ==
- Joe Skeen Campground, Bluewater Lake State Park
- Skeen Library, New Mexico Tech

Party political offices
Preceded by Pete Domenici	Republican nominee for Governor of New Mexico; 1974, 1978	Succeeded by John Irick
U.S. House of Representatives
Preceded by Harold L. Runnels	Member of the U.S. House of Representatives from New Mexico's 2nd congressional district January 3, 1981 – January 3, 2003	Succeeded by Steve Pearce
