= Harold Runnels =

American politician

Harold L. Runnels
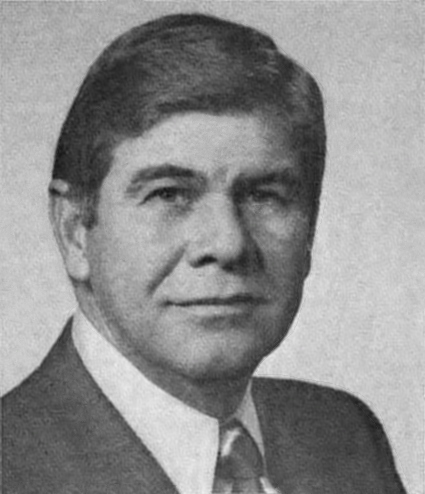

Member of the U.S. House of Representatives from New Mexico's 2nd district
- In office January 3, 1971 – August 5, 1980
- Preceded by: Ed Foreman
- Succeeded by: Joe Skeen

Member of the New Mexico State Senate
- In office 1960–1970

Personal details
- Born: Harold Lowell Runnels; March 17, 1924 Dallas, Texas, US
- Died: August 5, 1980 (aged 56) New York City, US
- Resting place: Rest Haven Memorial Gardens in Lovington, New Mexico, US
- Party: Democratic
- Spouse: Dorothy Runnels
- Profession: Businessman

Military service
- Branch/service: United States Army Air Forces Reserve
- Years of service: December 1942 – July 1943
- Rank: Private

Harold Lowell Runnels (March 17, 1924 – August 5, 1980) was an American businessman and politician who served five terms as a U.S. representative from New Mexico from 1971 to 1978.

== Biography ==
Runnels attended Dallas public schools and Cameron State Agricultural College (now Cemeron University) in Lawton, Oklahoma.

=== Early career ===
He was employed by the Federal Bureau of Investigation in Washington, D.C., in 1942. From 1945 to 1951, Runnels was a manager for the Magnolia Amusement Co. in Magnolia, Arkansas. He moved to Lovington, New Mexico, in 1951 and became a partner in Southland Supply Co., in 1952. In 1953 he formed Runnels Mud Co. and in 1964 RunCo Acidizing & Fracturing Co. In 1960, he was a founder of the Permian Basin Petroleum Association.

=== State Senate ===
He served as a member of the New Mexico Senate from 1960 to 1970, and as a delegate to New Mexico State Democratic conventions from 1960 to 1979.

=== Congress ===
Runnels was elected as a Democrat to the Ninety-second and to the four succeeding Congresses and served from January 3, 1971, until his death.

=== Death and burial ===
He died in New York City on August 5, 1980, of respiratory failure while being treated for pleurisy and cancer. He was interred at Rest Haven Memorial Gardens in Lovington, New Mexico.

=== Legacy ===
The Harold Runnels Papers (1971-1980) from his time in the U.S. Congress are held in the Special Collections of Eastern New Mexico University. Within the Golden Student Success Center is the Runnels Room, an art gallery named in Runnels' honor after a portion of his estate was bequeathed to the university.

=== Family ===
His son, Mike Runnels, served as Lieutenant Governor of New Mexico from 1983 to 1987.

== Electoral results ==
1970 United States House of Representatives elections in New Mexico: District 2
Party	Candidate	Votes	%
Democratic	Harold L. Runnels	64,518	51.37
Republican	Ed Foreman (Incumbent)	61,074	48.63
Total votes		125,592	100.0
Democratic gain from Republican			

1972 United States House of Representatives elections in New Mexico: District 2
Party	Candidate	Votes	%
Democratic	Harold L. Runnels (Incumbent)	116,152	72.17
Republican	George E. Presson	44,784	27.83
Total votes		160,936	100.0
Democratic hold			

1974 United States House of Representatives elections in New Mexico: District 2
Party	Candidate	Votes	%
Democratic	Harold L. Runnels (Incumbent)	90,127	66.74
Republican	Donald W. Trubey	43,045	31.88
American Independent	Herbert Horton	1,860	1.38
Total votes		135,032	100.0
Democratic hold			

1976 United States House of Representatives elections in New Mexico: District 2
Party	Candidate	Votes	%
Democratic	Harold L. Runnels (Incumbent)	123,563	70.33
Republican	Donald W. Trubey	52,131	29.67
Total votes		175,694	100.0
Democratic hold			

1978 United States House of Representatives elections in New Mexico: District 2
Party	Candidate	Votes	%
Democratic	Harold L. Runnels (Incumbent)	95,710	100.00
Total votes		95,710	100.0
Democratic hold			

== See also ==
- List of members of the United States Congress who died in office (1950–1999)

== Sources ==
- United States Congress. "Harold Runnels (id: R000510)". Biographical Directory of the United States Congress.

U.S. House of Representatives
Preceded by Ed Foreman	Member of the U.S. House of Representatives from New Mexico's 2nd congressional district January 3, 1971 – August 5, 1980	Succeeded by Joe Skeen
