= 2014 United States House of Representatives elections in New Mexico =

- November 4, 2014

All 3 New Mexico seats to the United States House of Representatives
| | Majority party | Minority party |
|---|---|---|
| Party | Democratic | Republican |
| Last election | 2 | 1 |
| Seats won | 2 | 1 |
| Seat change | Steady | Steady |
| Popular vote | 271,222 | 240,663 |
| Percentage | 52.98% | 47.02% |
| Swing | ▼2.13% | ▲2.21% |

Democratic
50–60%
60–70%
70–80%
80–90%
Republican
50–60%
60–70%
70–80%
80–90%

The 2014 United States House of Representatives elections in New Mexico were held on Tuesday, November 4, 2014 to elect the three U.S. representatives from the state of New Mexico, one from each of the state's three congressional districts. The elections coincided with the elections of other federal and state offices, including the governor of New Mexico and a United States senator.

== Overview ==
Results of the 2014 United States House of Representatives elections in New Mexico by district:

| District | Democratic | | Republican | | Others | | Total | | Result |
| District | Votes | % | Votes | % | Votes | % | Votes | % | Result |
|---|---|---|---|---|---|---|---|---|---|
| District 1 | 105,474 | 58.59% | 74,558 | 41.41% | 0 | 4.54% | 180,032 | 100% | Democratic Hold |
| District 2 | 52,499 | 35.52% | 95,209 | 64.43% | 69 | 0.05% | 147,777 | 100% | Republican Hold |
| District 3 | 113,249 | 61.52% | 70,775 | 38.45% | 52 | 0.03% | 184,076 | 100% | Democratic Hold |
| Total | 271,222 | 52.99% | 240,542 | 46.99% | 121 | 0.02% | 511,885 | 100% | |

== District 1 ==
2014 New Mexico's 1st congressional district election
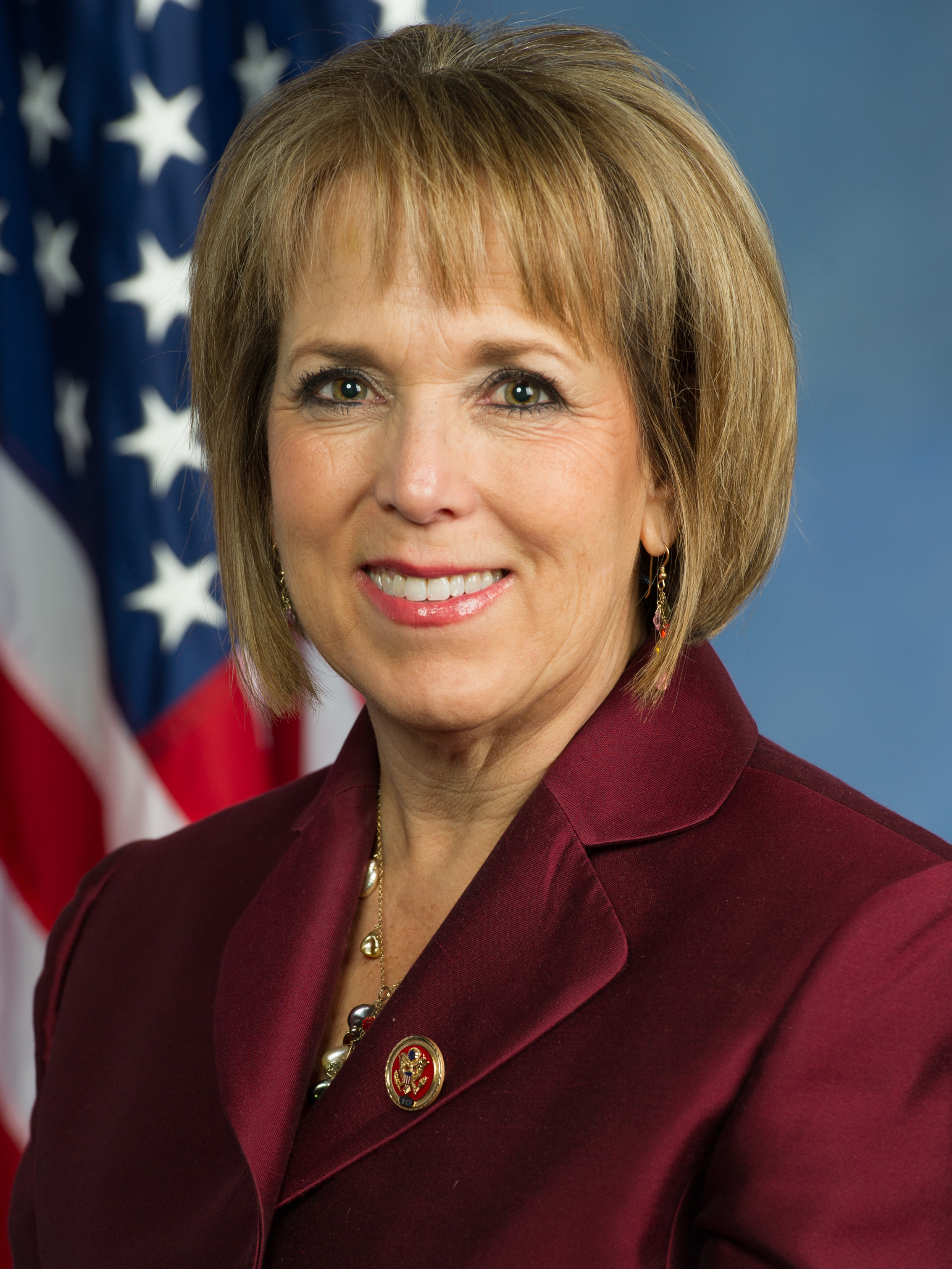

| Nominee | Michelle Lujan Grisham | Michael Frese |
| Party | Democratic | Republican |
| Popular vote | 105,474 | 74,558 |
| Percentage | 58.6% | 41.4% |
- County results Grisham: 50–60% Frese: 50–60% 60–70%
U.S. Representative before election
Michelle Lujan Grisham
Democratic
Elected U.S. Representative
Michelle Lujan Grisham
Democratic

The 1st district includes the central area of New Mexico, including almost three-fourths of Albuquerque. Incumbent Democrat Michelle Lujan Grisham, who had represented the district since 2013, ran for re-election. She was elected with 59% of the vote in 2012, succeeding retiring Democratic incumbent Martin Heinrich. The district has a PVI of D+7.

=== Democratic primary ===
==== Candidates ====
===== Nominee =====
- Michelle Lujan Grisham, incumbent U.S. Representative

==== Primary results ====
Democratic primary results
| Party | Candidate | Votes | % |
|---|---|---|---|
| Democratic | Michelle Lujan Grisham (incumbent) | 29,133 | 100.0 |

=== Republican primary ===
==== Candidates ====
===== Nominee =====
- Michael Frese, small business owner

===== Eliminated in primary =====
- Richard Priem, businessman

===== Withdrawn =====
- Mike McEntee, former Albuquerque City Councilman

==== Primary results ====
Republican primary results
| Party | Candidate | Votes | % |
|---|---|---|---|
| Republican | Michael Frese | 13,300 | 65.34 |
| Republican | Richard Priem | 7,054 | 34.66 |
| Total votes | | 20,354 | 100 |

=== General election ===
==== Predictions ====
| Source | Ranking | As of |
|---|---|---|
| The Cook Political Report | Safe D | November 3, 2014 |
| Rothenberg | Safe D | October 24, 2014 |
| Sabato's Crystal Ball | Safe D | October 30, 2014 |
| RCP | Safe D | November 2, 2014 |
| Daily Kos Elections | Safe D | November 4, 2014 |

==== Results ====
New Mexico's 1st congressional district, 2014
| Party | Candidate | Votes | % |
|---|---|---|---|
| Democratic | Michelle Lujan Grisham (incumbent) | 105,474 | 58.6 |
| Republican | Michael Frese | 74,558 | 41.4 |
| Total votes | | 180,032 | 100.0 |
| Democratic hold | | | |

== District 2 ==
2014 New Mexico's 2nd congressional district election
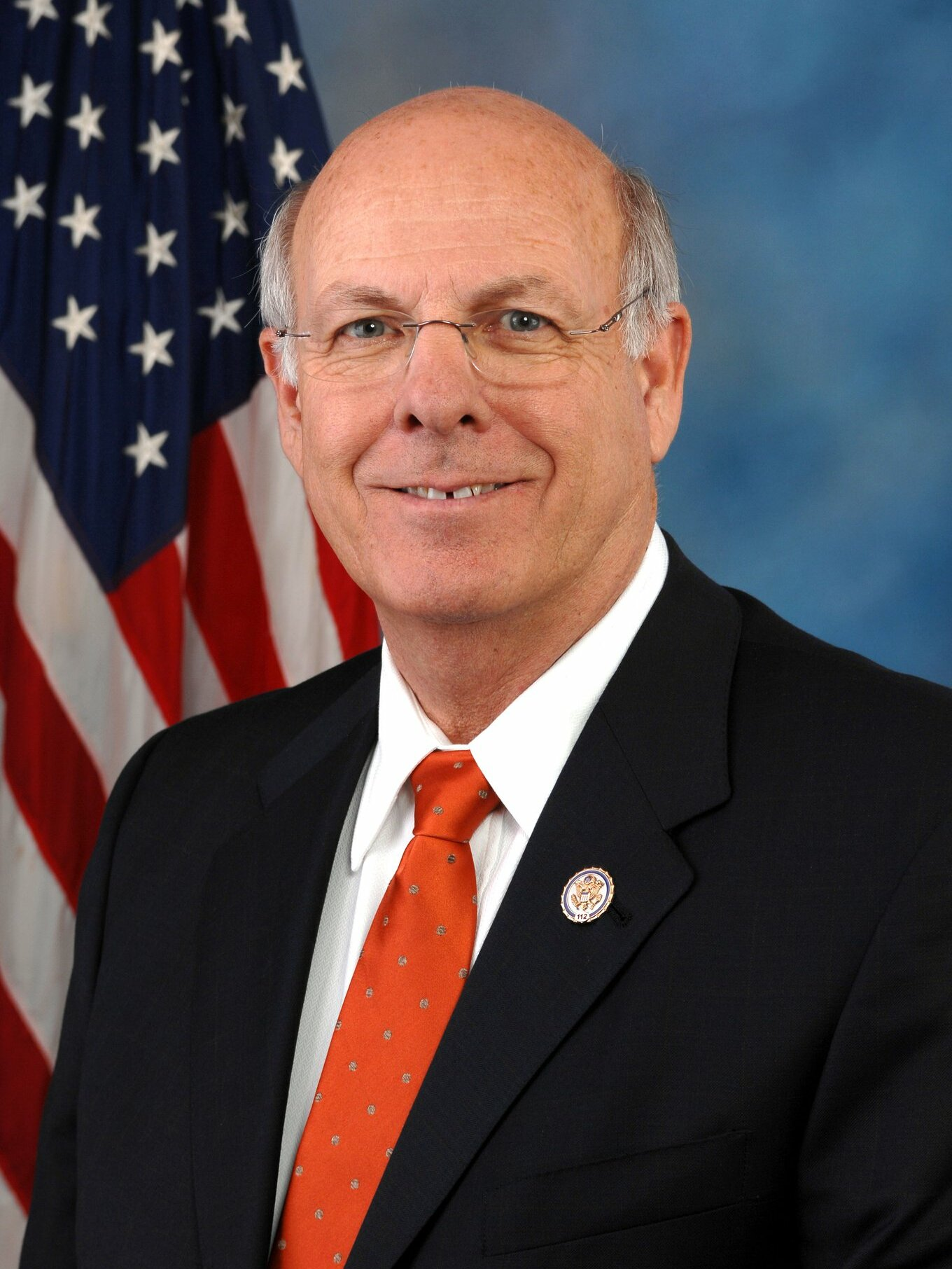

| Nominee | Steve Pearce | Rocky Lara |
| Party | Republican | Democratic |
| Popular vote | 95,209 | 52,499 |
| Percentage | 64.4% | 35.5% |
- County results Pearce: 50–60% 60–70% 70–80% 80–90%
U.S. Representative before election
Steve Pearce
Republican
Elected U.S. Representative
Steve Pearce
Republican

The 2nd district includes the southern half of New Mexico, including Las Cruces, Roswell and the southern fourth of Albuquerque. Geographically, it is the sixth largest district in the nation and the 2nd-largest not to comprise an entire state (after Nevada's 2nd district). Incumbent Republican Steve Pearce, ran for re-election.

=== Republican primary ===
==== Candidates ====
===== Nominee =====
- Steve Pearce, incumbent U.S. Representative

==== Primary results ====
Republican primary results
| Party | Candidate | Votes | % |
|---|---|---|---|
| Republican | Steve Pearce (incumbent) | 24,598 | 100.0 |

=== Democratic primary ===
==== Candidates ====
===== Nominee =====
- Rocky Lara, Eddy County Commissioner

===== Withdrawn =====
- Leslie Endean-Singh, attorney and businesswoman

===== Declined =====
- Joe A. Campos, former state representative

==== Primary results ====
Democratic primary results
| Party | Candidate | Votes | % |
|---|---|---|---|
| Democratic | Roxanne "Rocky" Lara | 21,751 | 100.0 |

=== General election ===
==== Predictions ====
| Source | Ranking | As of |
|---|---|---|
| The Cook Political Report | Safe R | November 3, 2014 |
| Rothenberg | Safe R | October 24, 2014 |
| Sabato's Crystal Ball | Safe R | October 30, 2014 |
| RCP | Safe R | November 2, 2014 |
| Daily Kos Elections | Safe R | November 4, 2014 |

==== Results ====
New Mexico's 2nd congressional district, 2014
| Party | Candidate | Votes | % |
|---|---|---|---|
| Republican | Steve Pearce (incumbent) | 95,209 | 64.4 |
| Democratic | Rocky Lara | 52,499 | 35.5 |
| Republican | Jack McGrann (write-in) | 69 | 0.1 |
| Total votes | | 147,777 | 100.0 |
| Republican hold | | | |

== District 3 ==
2014 New Mexico's 3rd congressional district election
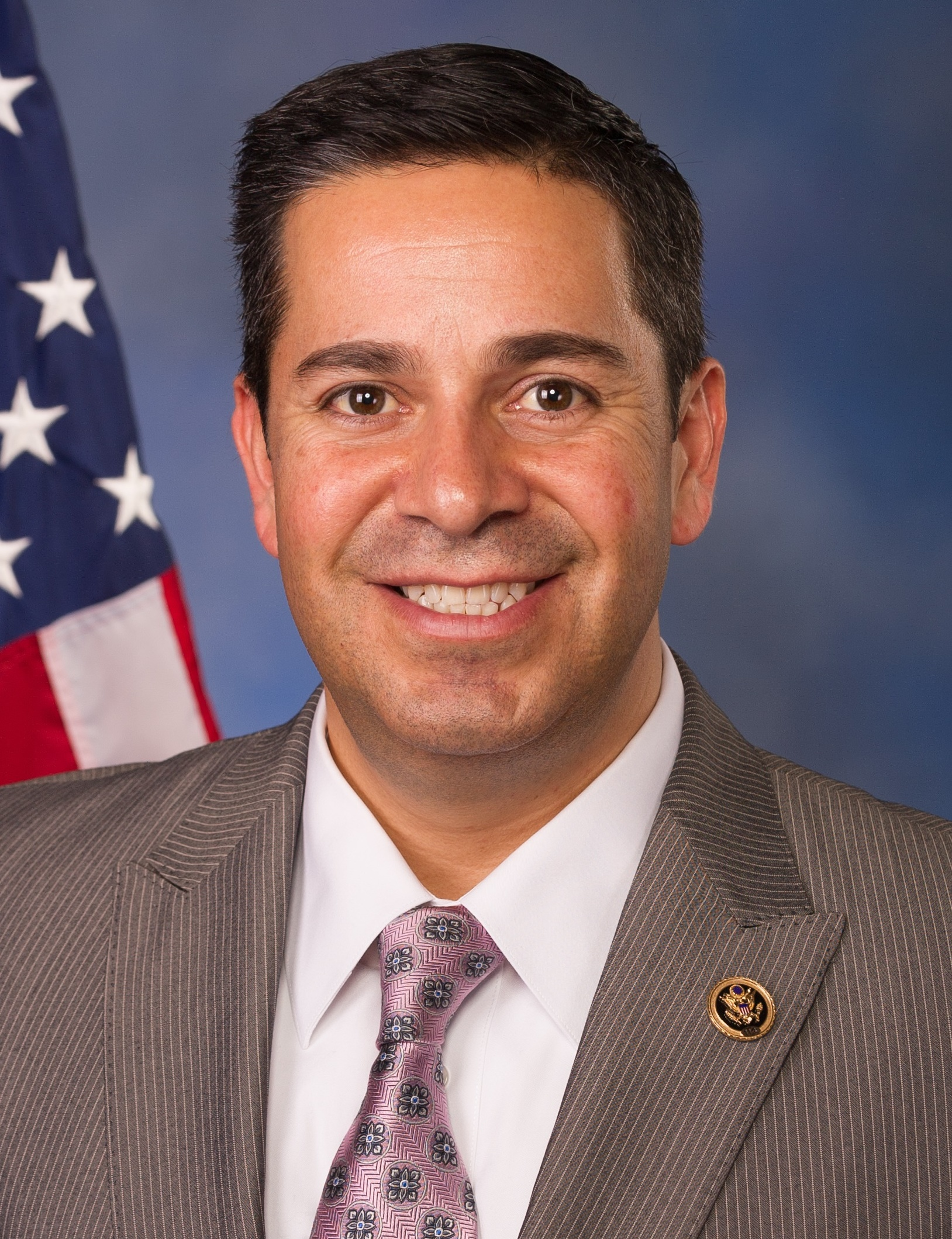

| Nominee | Ben Ray Luján | Jefferson Byrd |
| Party | Democratic | Republican |
| Popular vote | 113,249 | 70,775 |
| Percentage | 61.5% | 38.5% |
- County results Luján: 50–60% 70–80% 80–90% Byrd: 50–60% 60–70% 70–80%
U.S. Representative before election
Ben Ray Luján
Democratic
Elected U.S. Representative
Ben Ray Luján
Democratic

The 3rd district the northern half of New Mexico, including the state's Capital, Santa Fe. Incumbent Democrat Ben R. Luján, who has represented the district since 2009, ran for re-election. He was re-elected with 63% of the vote in 2012 and the district has a PVI of D+8.

=== Democratic primary ===
==== Candidates ====
===== Nominee =====
- Ben Ray Luján, incumbent U.S. Representative

===== Eliminated in primary =====
- Robert Blanch, Albuquerque Assistant District Attorney

==== Primary results ====
Democratic primary results
| Party | Candidate | Votes | % |
|---|---|---|---|
| Democratic | Ben R. Luján (incumbent) | 50,709 | 87.6 |
| Democratic | Robert Blanch | 7,207 | 12.4 |
| Total votes | | 57,916 | 100.0 |

=== Republican primary ===
==== Candidates ====
===== Nominee =====
- Jefferson Byrd, rancher and nominee for this seat in 2012

==== Primary results ====
Republican primary results
| Party | Candidate | Votes | % |
|---|---|---|---|
| Republican | Jefferson Byrd | 15,690 | 100.0 |

=== General election ===
==== Predictions ====
| Source | Ranking | As of |
|---|---|---|
| The Cook Political Report | Safe D | November 3, 2014 |
| Rothenberg | Safe D | October 24, 2014 |
| Sabato's Crystal Ball | Safe D | October 30, 2014 |
| RCP | Safe D | November 2, 2014 |
| Daily Kos Elections | Safe D | November 4, 2014 |

=== Debate ===
2014 New Mexico's 3rd congressional district debate
| No. | Date | Host | Moderator | Link | Democratic | Republican |
| Key: P Participant A Absent N Not invited I Invited W Withdrawn | | | | | | |
| Key: P Participant A Absent N Not invited I Invited W Withdrawn | | | | | Ben Ray Luján | Jefferson Byrd |
|---|---|---|---|---|---|---|
| 1 | October 23, 2014 | New Mexico PBS | Sam Donaldson | YouTube | P | P |

==== Results ====
New Mexico's 3rd congressional district, 2014
| Party | Candidate | Votes | % |
|---|---|---|---|
| Democratic | Ben Ray Luján (incumbent) | 113,249 | 61.5 |
| Republican | Jefferson Byrd | 70,775 | 38.5 |
| Republican | Thomas Hook (write-in) | 52 | 0.0 |
| Total votes | | 184,076 | 100.0 |
| Democratic hold | | | |

== See also ==
- 2014 United States House of Representatives elections
- 2014 United States elections
