= 2010 New Mexico elections =

- November 2, 2010

A general election was held in the U.S. state of New Mexico on November 2, 2010. All of New Mexico's executive officers were up for election as well all of New Mexico's three seats in the United States House of Representatives. Primary elections were held on June 1, 2010.

== Governor and Lieutenant Governor ==
Incumbent Governor Bill Richardson (D) was term-limited and thus cannot run to a third consecutive term. The primaries were won by the Lieutenant Governor Diane Denish in the Democratic side and by the district attorney Susana Martinez in the Republican side.

New Mexico gubernatorial election, 2010
| Party | Candidate | Votes | % |
|---|---|---|---|
| Republican | Susana Martinez / John Sanchez | 321,219 | 53.29 |
| Democratic | Diane Denish / Brian Colón | 280,614 | 46.55 |
| Write-ins | Kenneth A. Gomez | 994 | 0.16 |
| Majority | | 40,605 | 6.74 |
| Turnout | | 602,827 | 100 |
| Republican gain from Democratic | | | |

== Attorney General ==
2010 New Mexico Attorney General election
- November 2, 2010
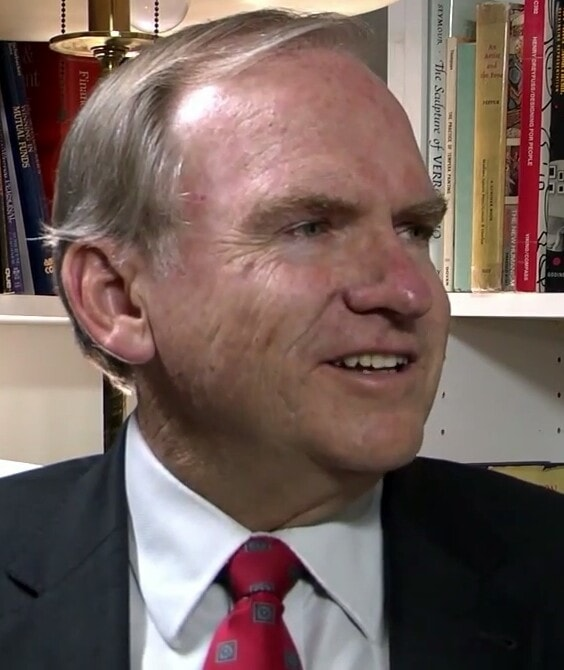

| Nominee | Gary King | Matthew Chandler |
| Party | Democratic | Republican |
| Popular vote | 321,547 | 277,139 |
| Percentage | 53.7% | 46.3% |
- King: 50–60% 60–70% 70–80% 80–90% >90% Chandler: 50–60% 60–70% 70–80% 80–90% >90% Tie: 50% No votes
Attorney General before election
Gary King
Democratic
Elected Attorney General
Gary King
Democratic

Incumbent Attorney General Gary King won a second term in office, defeating Republican Matthew E. Chandler.

New Mexico Attorney General election, 2010
| Party | Candidate | Votes | % |
|---|---|---|---|
| Democratic | Gary King | 321,547 | 53.71 |
| Republican | Matthew E. Chandler | 277,139 | 46.29 |
| Majority | | 44,408 | 7.42 |
| Turnout | | 598,686 | 100 |
| Democratic hold | | | |

== Secretary of State ==
2010 New Mexico Secretary of State election
| Nominee | Dianna Duran | Mary Herrera |
| Party | Republican | Democratic |
| Popular vote | 341,915 | 253,325 |
| Percentage | 57.4% | 42.6% |
- Duran: 50–60% 60–70% 70–80% 80–90% >90% Herrera: 50–60% 60–70% 70–80% 80–90% >90% Tie: 50% No data
Secretary of State before election
Mary Herrera
Democratic
Elected Secretary of State
Dianna Duran
Republican

Incumbent Secretary of State Mary Herrera (D) ran for a second term in office, but was defeated by the Republican Dianna Duran.

In March of 2010, New Mexico Attorney General Gary King began an investigation into allegations that Herrera solicited donations from organizations that had contracts with the Secretary of State's office and ordered employees to gather signatures for her re-election campaign. Herrera denied the allegations, but the scandals surrounding her contributed to her defeat.

New Mexico Secretary of State election, 2010
| Party | Candidate | Votes | % |
|---|---|---|---|
| Republican | Dianna Duran | 341,915 | 57.44 |
| Democratic | Mary Herrera | 253,325 | 42.56 |
| Majority | | 88,590 | 6.74 |
| Turnout | | 595,240 | 100 |
| Republican gain from Democratic | | | |

== Treasurer ==
2010 New Mexico State Treasurer election
- November 2, 2010
| Nominee | James Lewis | Jim Schoonover |
| Party | Democratic | Republican |
| Popular vote | 324,624 | 261,724 |
| Percentage | 55.4% | 44.6% |
- Lewis: 50–60% 60–70% 70–80% 80–90% >90% Schoonover: 50–60% 60–70% 70–80% 80–90% >90% Tie: 50% No data
State Treasurer before election
James Lewis
Democratic
Elected State Treasurer
James Lewis
Democratic

Incumbent Treasurer James Lewis (D) won a second consecutive term, and third term overall, in office, defeating Republican Jim Schoonover.

New Mexico Attorney General election, 2010
| Party | Candidate | Votes | % |
|---|---|---|---|
| Democratic | James Lewis | 324,624 | 55.36 |
| Republican | Jim Schoonover | 261,724 | 44.64 |
| Majority | | 62,900 | 10.72 |
| Turnout | | 586,348 | 100 |
| Democratic hold | | | |

== Auditor ==
New Mexico Auditor election, 2010
- November 2, 2010
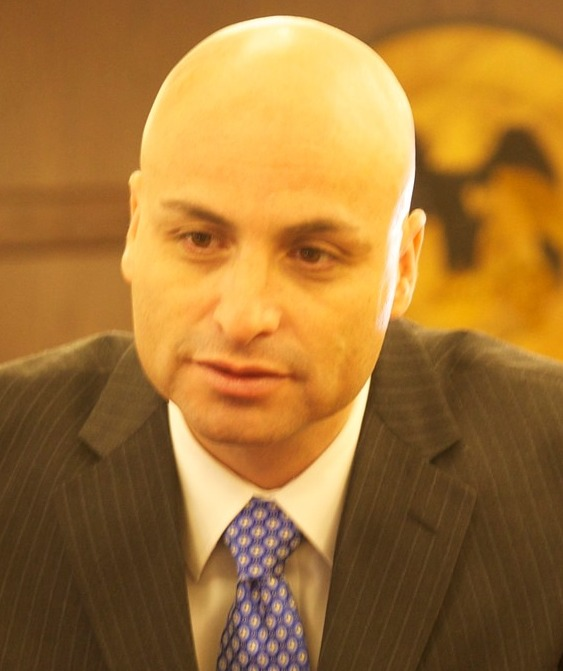

| Nominee | Hector Balderas | Errol Chavez |
| Party | Democratic | Republican |
| Popular vote | 323,427 | 263,008 |
| Percentage | 55.2% | 44.8% |
- Balderas: 50–60% 60–70% 70–80% 80–90% >90% Chavez: 50–60% 60–70% 70–80% 80–90% >90% Tie: 50% No votes
Auditor before election
Hector Balderas
Democratic
Elected Auditor
Hector Balderas
Democratic

Incumbent Auditor Hector Balderas (D) won a second term in office, defeating Republican Errol Chavez.

New Mexico Attorney General election, 2010
| Party | Candidate | Votes | % |
|---|---|---|---|
| Democratic | Hector Balderas | 323,427 | 55.15 |
| Republican | Errol Chavez | 263,008 | 44.85 |
| Majority | | 60,419 | 10.30 |
| Turnout | | 586,435 | 100 |
| Democratic hold | | | |

== Land Commissioner ==
2010 New Mexico Commissioner of Public Lands election
- November 2, 2010
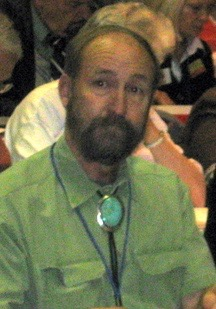

| Nominee | Ray Powell | Matthew Rush |
| Party | Democratic | Republican |
| Popular vote | 308,033 | 279,664 |
| Percentage | 52.4% | 47.6% |
- Powell: 50–60% 60–70% 70–80% 80–90% >90% Rush: 50–60% 60–70% 70–80% 80–90% >90% Tie: 50% No votes
Commissioner of Public Lands before election
Patrick H. Lyons
Democratic
Elected Commissioner of Public Lands
Ray Powell
Democratic

Incumbent Land Commissioner Patrick H. Lyons (D) was term-limited and thus could not run to a third consecutive term. He was succeeded by the former Land Commissioner Ray Powell.

New Mexico Attorney General election, 2010
| Party | Candidate | Votes | % |
|---|---|---|---|
| Democratic | Ray Powell | 308,033 | 52.41 |
| Republican | Matthew Rush | 279,664 | 47.59 |
| Majority | | 28,369 | 4.82 |
| Turnout | | 587,697 | 100 |
| Democratic hold | | | |
