= 2006 United States House of Representatives elections in New Mexico =

- November 7, 2006

All 3 New Mexico seats to the United States House of Representatives
	Majority party	Minority party
Party	Republican	Democratic
Last election	2	1
Seats won	2	1
Seat change	Steady	Steady
Popular vote	247,825	313,124
Percentage	44.17%	55.81%
Swing	▼3.99%	▲4.00%

Democratic
50–60%
60–70%
70–80%
80–90%
Republican
50–60%
60–70%
70–80%
80–90%

The 2006 United States House of Representatives elections in New Mexico were held on November 4, 2006 to determine who will represent the state of New Mexico in the United States House of Representatives. New Mexico has three seats in the House, apportioned according to the 2000 United States census. Representatives are elected for two-year terms.

As of 2026, this is the last time that Republicans won a majority of congressional districts in New Mexico. New Mexico was also one of seven states in which the party that won the state's popular vote did not win a majority of seats in 2006, the other states being Indiana, Nevada, Michigan, Ohio, Iowa, and Wisconsin.

== Overview ==
United States House of Representatives elections in New Mexico, 2006
Party	Votes	Percentage	Seats	+/–
Democratic	313,124	55.81%	1	—
Republican	247,825	44.17%	2	—
Independents	135	0.02%	0	—
Totals	561,084	100.00%	3	—

== District 1 ==
2006 New Mexico's 1st congressional district election
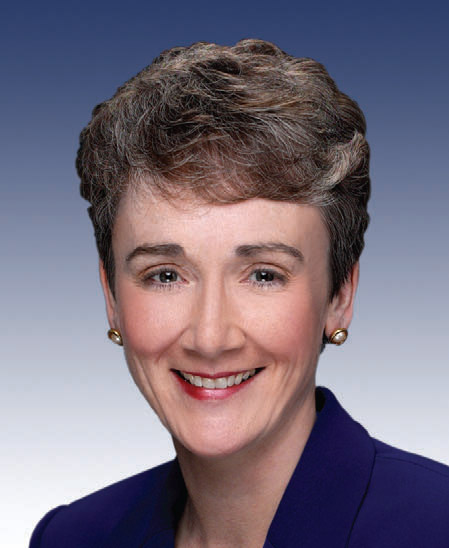

Nominee	Heather Wilson	Patricia A. Madrid
Party	Republican	Democratic
Popular vote	105,986	105,125
Percentage	50.20%	49.80%
- County results Wilson: 50–60% 60–70% Madrid: 50–60%
U.S. Representative before election
Heather Wilson
Republican
Elected U.S. Representative
Heather Wilson
Republican

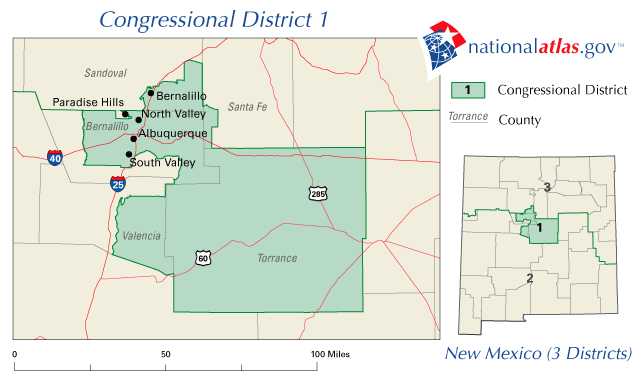

Incumbent Republican Heather Wilson defeated Democrat Patricia A. Madrid, the State Attorney General by a very slim margin. This district covers the central part of the state.

=== Endorsements ===
Patricia A. Madrid (D)

Individuals

- Wesley Clark, General, 2004 democratic presidential candidate

==== Predictions ====
Source	Ranking	As of
The Cook Political Report	Tossup	November 6, 2006
Rothenberg	Tossup	November 6, 2006
Sabato's Crystal Ball	Tilt D (flip)	November 6, 2006
Real Clear Politics	Tossup	November 7, 2006
CQ Politics	Tossup	November 7, 2006

New Mexico's 1st congressional district election, 2006
Party	Candidate	Votes	%
Republican	Heather Wilson (incumbent)	105,986	50.20
Democratic	Patricia Madrid	105,125	49.80
Total votes		211,111	100.00
Republican hold			

== District 2 ==
2006 New Mexico's 2nd congressional district election
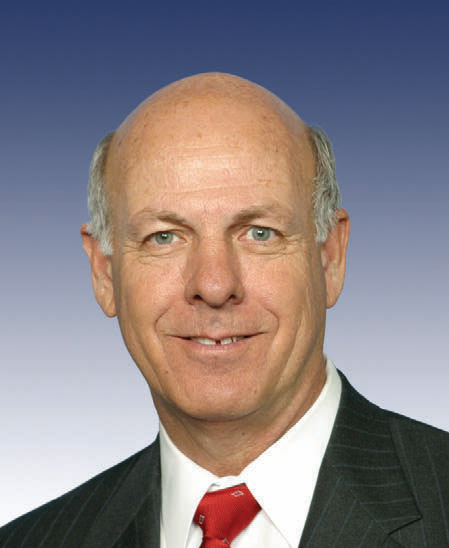

Nominee	Steve Pearce	Albert Kissling
Party	Republican	Democratic
Popular vote	92,620	63,119
Percentage	59.42%	40.49%
- County results Pearce: 50–60% 60–70% 70–80% 80–90% Kissling: 50–60%
U.S. Representative before election
Steve Pearce
Republican
Elected U.S. Representative
Steve Pearce
Republican

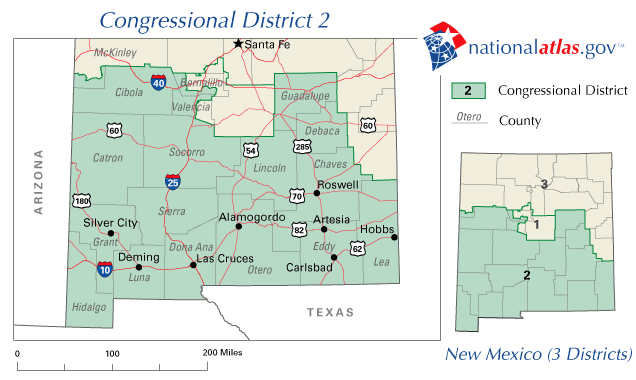

Incumbent Republican Steve Pearce defeated Democrat Albert Kissling. The district covers the southern part of the state.

=== Predictions ===
Source	Ranking	As of
The Cook Political Report	Safe R	November 6, 2006
Rothenberg	Safe R	November 6, 2006
Sabato's Crystal Ball	Safe R	November 6, 2006
Real Clear Politics	Safe R	November 7, 2006
CQ Politics	Safe R	November 7, 2006

New Mexico's 2nd congressional district election, 2006
Party	Candidate	Votes	%
Republican	Steve Pearce (incumbent)	92,620	59.42
Democratic	Albert Kissling	63,119	40.49
Write-ins		135	0.02
Total votes		155,874	100.00
Republican hold			

== District 3 ==
2006 New Mexico's 3rd congressional district election
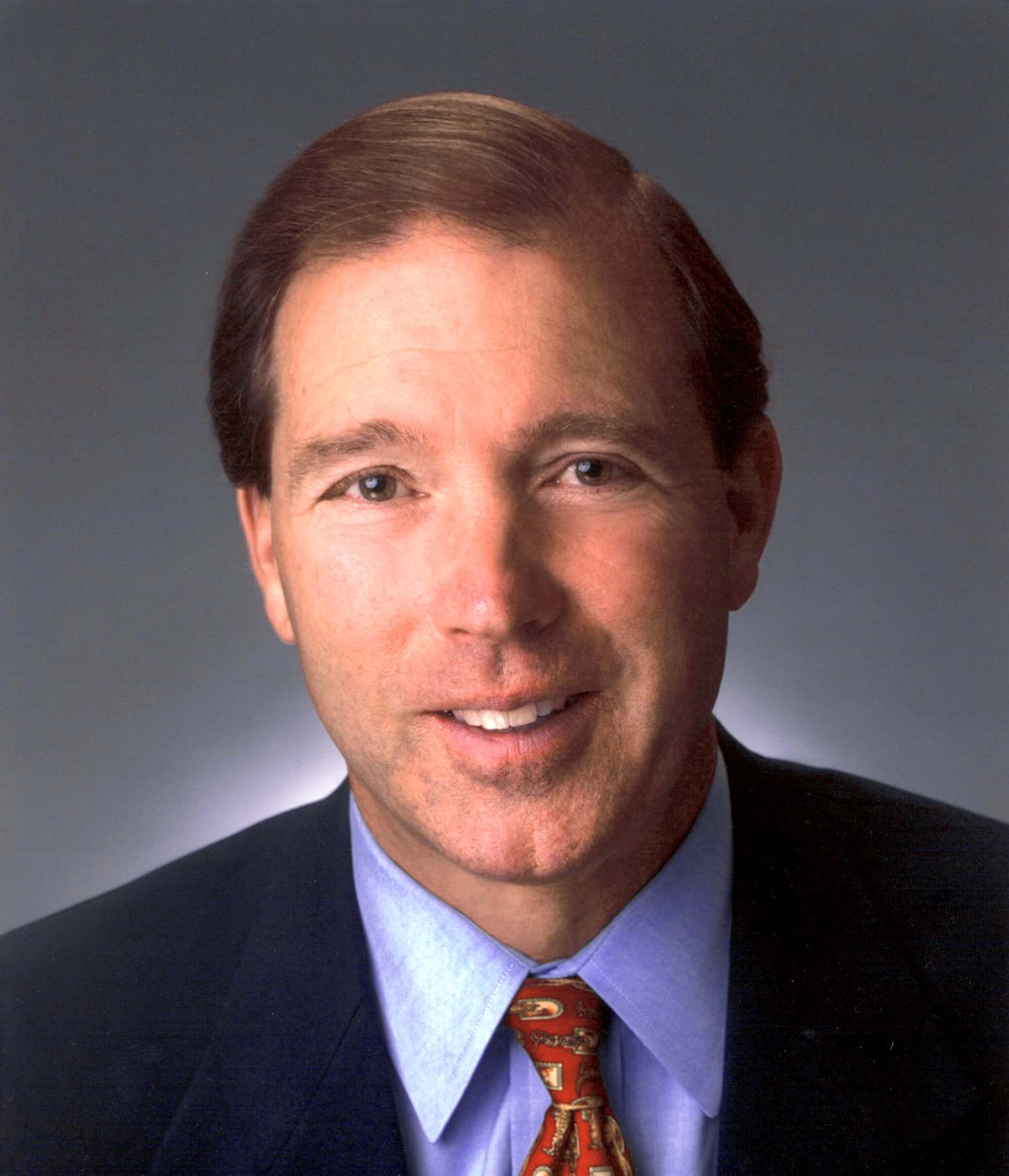

Nominee	Tom Udall	Bill Dolin
Party	Democratic	Republican
Popular vote	144,880	49,219
Percentage	74.64%	25.36%
- County results Udall: 50–60% 60–70% 70–80% 80–90%
U.S. Representative before election
Tom Udall
Democratic
Elected U.S. Representative
Tom Udall
Democratic

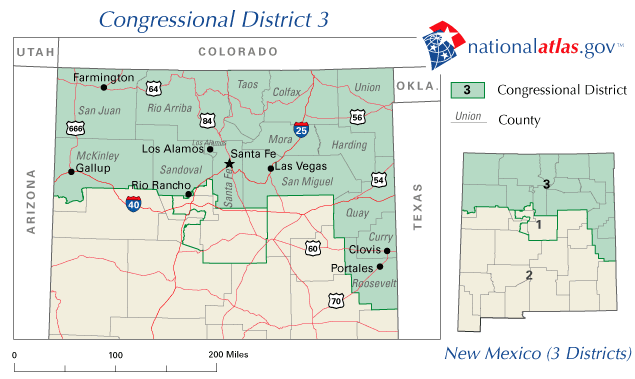

Incumbent Democrat Tom Udall defeated Republican Ronald Dolin. The district covers the northern part of the state.

=== Predictions ===
Source	Ranking	As of
The Cook Political Report	Safe D	November 6, 2006
Rothenberg	Safe D	November 6, 2006
Sabato's Crystal Ball	Safe D	November 6, 2006
Real Clear Politics	Safe D	November 7, 2006
CQ Politics	Safe D	November 7, 2006

New Mexico's 3rd congressional district election, 2006
Party	Candidate	Votes	%
Democratic	Tom Udall (incumbent)	144,880	74.64
Republican	Bill Dolin	49,219	25.36
Total votes		194,099	100.00
Democratic hold			
