= 1968 United States House of Representatives elections in New Mexico =

- November 5, 1968

All 2 New Mexico seats to the United States House of Representatives
	Majority party	Minority party
Party	Republican	Democratic
Last election	0	2
Seats won	2	0
Seat change	▲2	▼2
Popular vote	160,374	147,975
Percentage	51.8%	47.8%
Swing	▲5.0%	▼5.4%
District results
Republican
50–60%

The 1968 United States House of Representatives election in New Mexico was held on November 5, 1968, to elect the state's two representatives.

This was the first election in which New Mexico elected their members using single-member districts instead of at-large districts. This was because of the Uniform Congressional District Act, which dictates that members of the United States House of Representatives must be elected from geographical districts and that these must be single-member districts. This was also the first election since 1928 in which Republicans won a congressional district in New Mexico.

This election saw the election of former US Representative from Texas Ed Foreman to the 2nd district. As a result, Foreman is the most historically recent member of Congress to have represented more than one state during their career.

== Overview ==
United States House of Representatives elections in New Mexico, 1968
Party	Votes	Percentage	Seats	+/–
Republican	160,374	51.76%	2	+1
Democratic	147,975	47.76%	0	—
Others	1,487	0.48%	0	—
Totals	309,836	100.00%	2	—

== District 1 ==
New Mexico's 1st congressional district election, 1968
Party	Candidate	Votes	%
Republican	Manuel Lujan Jr.	88,517	52.85
Democratic	Thomas G. Morris (incumbent)	78,117	46.64
Others		854	0.51
Total votes		167,488	100.00
Republican gain from Democratic			

== District 2 ==
New Mexico's 2nd congressional district election, 1968
Party	Candidate	Votes	%
Republican	Ed Foreman	71,857	50.48
Democratic	E. S. Johnny Walker (incumbent)	69,858	49.08
Others		633	0.44
Total votes		142,348	100.00
Republican gain from Democratic			
