= 1970 United States House of Representatives elections in New Mexico =

- November 3, 1970

All 2 New Mexico seats to the United States House of Representatives
	Majority party	Minority party
Party	Republican	Democratic
Last election	2	0
Seats won	1	1
Seat change	▼1	▲1
Popular vote	152,261	129,116
Percentage	54.1%	45.9%
Swing	▲2.3%	▼1.9%
District results
Republican
50–60%
Democratic
50–60%

The 1970 United States House of Representatives election in New Mexico was held on Tuesday November 3, 1970 to elect the state's two representatives to serve in the United States House of Representatives.

Republicans retained the 1st District while Democrats flipped the 2nd District. This made the state's delegation evenly split.

== Overview ==
United States House of Representatives elections in New Mexico, 1970
Party	Votes	Percentage	Seats	+/–
Republican	152,261	54.11%	1	-1
Democratic	129,116	45.89%	1	+1
Totals	281,377	100.00%	2	—

== District 1 ==
New Mexico's 1st congressional district election, 1970
Party	Candidate	Votes	%
Republican	Manuel Lujan Jr. (incumbent)	91,187	58.53
Democratic	Fabian Chavez Jr.	64,598	41.47
Total votes		155,785	100.00
Republican hold			

== District 2 ==
New Mexico's 2nd congressional district election, 1970
Party	Candidate	Votes	%
Democratic	Harold L. Runnels	64,518	51.37
Republican	Ed Foreman (incumbent)	61,074	48.63
Total votes		125,592	100.00
Democratic gain from Republican			
