= 2018 United States House of Representatives elections in New Mexico =

- November 6, 2018

All 3 New Mexico seats to the United States House of Representatives
	Majority party	Minority party
Party	Democratic	Republican
Last election	2	1
Seats won	3	0
Seat change	▲1	▼1
Popular vote	400,702	262,714
Percentage	58.25%	38.20%
Swing	▲2.24%	▼5.79%

Democratic
50–60%
60–70%
70–80%
80–90%
Republican
50–60%
60–70%
70–80%

The 2018 United States House of Representatives elections in New Mexico were held on November 6, 2018, to elect the three U.S. representatives from the state of New Mexico, one from each of the state's three congressional districts. The elections coincided with the gubernatorial election, as well as other elections to the House of Representatives, elections to the United States Senate and various state and local elections.

The Democratic party gained the 2nd Congressional seat, gaining unitary control of New Mexico's Congressional (House and Senate) delegation for the first time since 2008 and improving the advantage in the House delegation for New Mexico from 2–1 in favor of Democrats to 3–0.

== Overview ==
Results of the 2018 United States House of Representatives elections in New Mexico by district:

District	Democratic		Republican		Others		Total		Result
District	Votes	%	Votes	%	Votes	%	Votes	%	Result
District 1	147,336	59.13%	90,507	36.33%	11,319	4.54%	249,162	100%	Democratic hold
District 2	101,489	50.93%	97,767	49.07%	n/a		199,256	100%	Democratic gain
District 3	148,501	60.64%	76,427	31.21%	13,265	5.42%	244,893	100%	Democratic hold
Total	404,026	58.27%	264,701	38.18%	24,584	3.55%	693,311	100%	

== District 1 ==
2018 New Mexico's 1st congressional district election
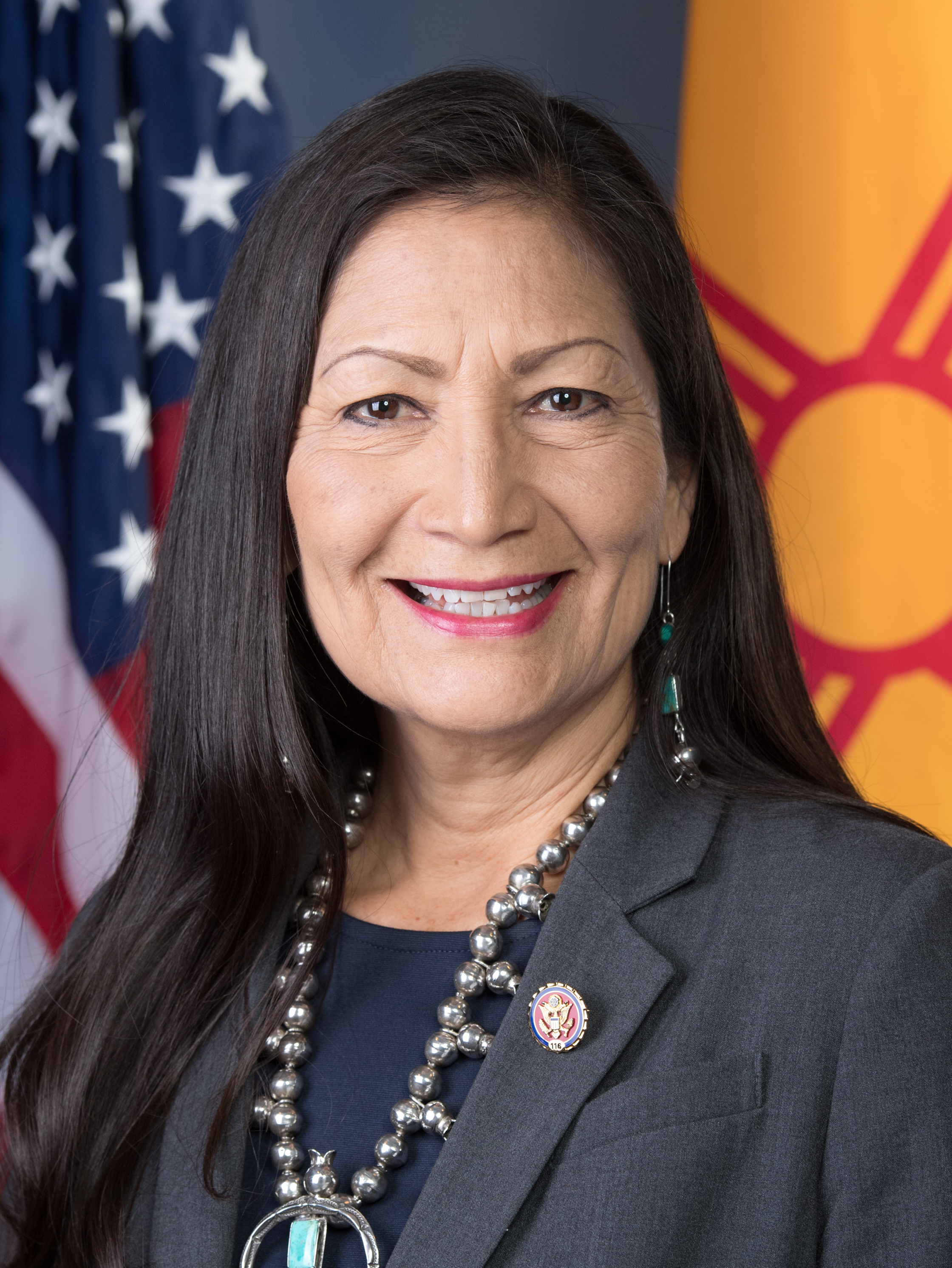

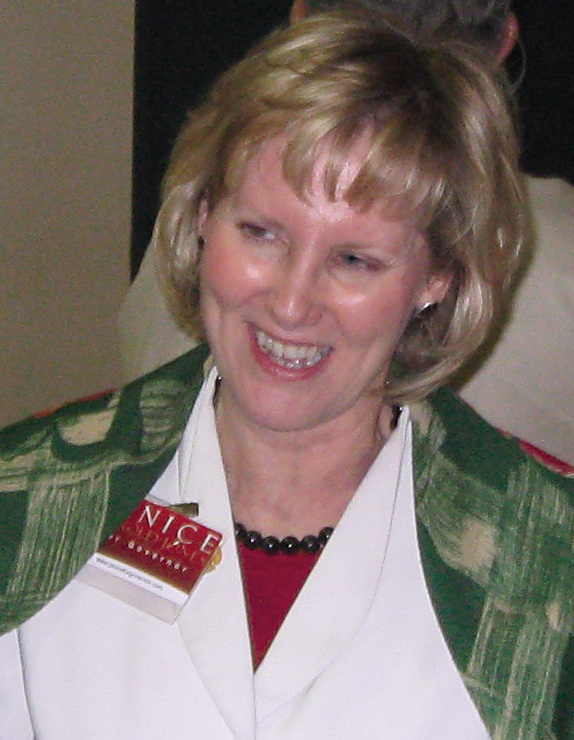
Nominee	Deb Haaland	Janice Arnold-Jones
Party	Democratic	Republican
Popular vote	147,336	90,507
Percentage	59.1%	36.3%
- Haaland: 40–50% 50–60% 60–70% 70–80% 80–90% >90% Jones: 40–50% 50–60% 60–70% 70–80% 80–90% No votes
U.S. Representative before election
Michelle Lujan Grisham
Democratic
Elected U.S. Representative
Deb Haaland
Democratic

The 1st district is centered around the Albuquerque metropolitan area. Democrat Michelle Lujan Grisham, who had represented the district since 2013, was reelected to a third term with 65% of the vote in 2016. Lujan Grisham did not run for reelection and instead successfully ran for governor of New Mexico.

New Mexico's 1st district was one of 36 Democrat-held House districts targeted by the National Republican Congressional Committee in 2018.

=== Democratic primary ===
==== Candidates ====
===== Declared =====
- Deb Haaland, former chair of the New Mexico Democratic Party and nominee for lieutenant governor of New Mexico in 2014
- Damian Lara, attorney
- Damon Martinez, former United States Attorney for the District of New Mexico
- Antoinette Sedillo Lopez, former law professor and executive director of Enlace Comunitario, an anti-domestic violence non-profit

===== Withdrew =====
- Annie Chavez, Sandia National Laboratories government relations official
- Pat Davis, Albuquerque city councilman (endorsed Haaland)
- Dennis Dinge, physicist

===== Declined =====
- Terry Brunner, USDA Rural Development state director and former state director for former U.S. senator Jeff Bingaman
- Jacob Candelaria, state senator
- Tanya Giddings, Bernalillo County assessor
- Javier Martinez, state representative
- Michael Padilla, state senator
- Ken Sanchez, Albuquerque city councilman
- Maggie Hart Stebbins, Bernalillo County commissioner

==== Polling ====
Poll source	Date(s) administered	Sample size	Margin of error	Pat Davis	Deb Haaland	Damian Lara	Damon Martinez	Paul Moya	Antoinette Sedillo-Lopez	Other	Undecided
Albuquerque Journal	May 20–24, 2018	395	± 4.9%	5%	19%	4%	22%	3%	17%	—	29%
Lake Research Partners (D) (Note: Poll sponsored for Damon Martinez.)	May 13–14, 2018	390	± 5.0%	—	20%	—	23%	—	25%	5%	27%
Public Policy Polling (D) (Note: Poll sponsored for Pat Davis.)	April 13–15, 2018	508	± 4.4	11%	15%	—	7%	—	15%	—	43%

==== Endorsements ====
Deb Haaland

Organizations

- Congressional Black Caucus PAC
- National Organization for Women (NOW PAC)

Individuals

- James Clyburn, U.S. representative (D-SC)
- Diane Denish, former lieutenant governor of New Mexico
- Fred Harris, former U.S. Senator and Chair of the National Democratic Party (D-OK)
- Martin Heinrich, U.S. senator (D-NM)
- Pramila Jayapal, U.S. representative (D-WA)
- Ben Ray Lujan, U.S. representative (D-NM)
- Terry McAuliffe, former governor of Virginia
- Gwen Moore, U.S. representative (D-WI)
- Barack Obama, former president of the United States
- Tom Perez, chair of the Democratic National Committee
- Elizabeth Warren, U.S. senator (D-MA)

==== Debate ====
2018 New Mexico's 1st congressional district Democratic primary debate
No.	Date	Host	Moderator	Link	Democratic	Democratic	Democratic	Democratic	Democratic	Democratic	Democratic	Democratic
Key: P Participant A Absent N Not invited I Invited W Withdrawn												
Key: P Participant A Absent N Not invited I Invited W Withdrawn					Annie Chavez	Pat Davis	Dennis Dinge	Deb Haaland	Damian Lara	Antoinette Sedillo Lopez	Damon Martinez	Paul Moya
1	May. 20, 2018	KOAT-TV; Albuquerque Journal	Doug Fernandez		N	P	N	P	P	P	P	P

==== Pre-primary convention results ====
Candidates for the Democratic nomination needed to either receive the votes of 20% of the delegates at the convention on March 10, or collect and submit signatures to the secretary of state to have made it to the June 5 primary.

Candidate	Percentage of delegates won	Automatically on ballot
Pat Davis	13.55%	✗
Deb Haaland	34.80%	✓
Damian Lara	12.09%	✗
Damon Martinez	10.81%	✗
Paul Moya	3.66%	✗
Antoinette Sedillo-Lopez	25.09%	✓

==== Results ====
Democratic primary results
Party	Candidate	Votes	%
Democratic	Deb Haaland	25,444	40.6
Democratic	Damon Martinez	16,182	25.8
Democratic	Antoinette Sedillo Lopez	12,919	20.6
Democratic	Paul Moya	3,691	5.9
Democratic	Pat Davis (withdrawn)	2,385	3.8
Democratic	Damian Lara	2,063	3.3
Total votes		62,687	100.0

=== Republican primary ===
==== Candidates ====
===== Declared =====
- Janice Arnold-Jones, former Albuquerque city councilwoman (2013–2014) and former state representative (2003–2011)

===== Declined =====
- Richard Berry, former mayor of Albuquerque (2009–2017)
- Wayne Johnson, Bernalillo County commissioner
- John Sanchez, lieutenant governor of New Mexico and nominee for governor of New Mexico in 2002

==== Results ====
Republican primary results
Party	Candidate	Votes	%
Republican	Janice Arnold-Jones	19,316	100.0
Total votes		19,316	100.0

=== Libertarian primary ===
==== Candidates ====
===== Declared =====
- Lloyd Princeton, business consultant

==== Results ====
Libertarian primary results
Party	Candidate	Votes	%
Libertarian	Lloyd Princeton	244	100.0
Total votes		244	100.0

=== General election ===
==== Predictions ====
Source	Ranking	As of
The Cook Political Report	Safe D	November 5, 2018
Inside Elections	Safe D	November 5, 2018
Sabato's Crystal Ball	Safe D	November 5, 2018
RCP	Likely D	November 5, 2018
Daily Kos	Safe D	November 5, 2018
538	Safe D	November 7, 2018

==== Forum ====
2018 New Mexico's 1st congressional district candidate forum
No.	Date	Host	Moderator	Link	Democratic	Republican	Libertarian
Key: P Participant A Absent N Not invited I Invited W Withdrawn							
Key: P Participant A Absent N Not invited I Invited W Withdrawn					Deb Haaland	Janice Arnold-Jones	Lloyd Princeton
1	Sep. 20, 2018	KENW (TV); KNME-TV; KRWG-TV	Gene Grant; Lorene Mills		P	P	P

==== Polling ====
Poll source	Date(s) administered	Sample size	Margin of error	Deb Haaland (D)	Janice Arnold-Jones (R)	Lloyd Princeton (L)	Undecided
Research & Polling, Inc.	October 26 — November 1, 2018	419	± 4.8%	50%	38%	5%	7%
Carroll Strategies	October 29, 2018	452	—	51%	43%	3%	2%
Emerson College	October 24–26, 2018	327	± 5.7%	51%	41%	—	6%
Research & Polling, Inc.	September 7–13, 2018	410	± 4.8%	49%	41%	3%	8%
Carroll Strategies	June 15–16, 2018	419	—	47%	43%	4%	6%

==== Results ====
New Mexico's 1st congressional district, 2018
Party	Candidate	Votes	%
Democratic	Deb Haaland	147,336	59.1
Republican	Janice Arnold-Jones	90,507	36.3
Libertarian	Lloyd Princeton	11,319	4.5
Total votes		249,162	100.0
Democratic hold			

== District 2 ==
2018 New Mexico's 2nd congressional district election
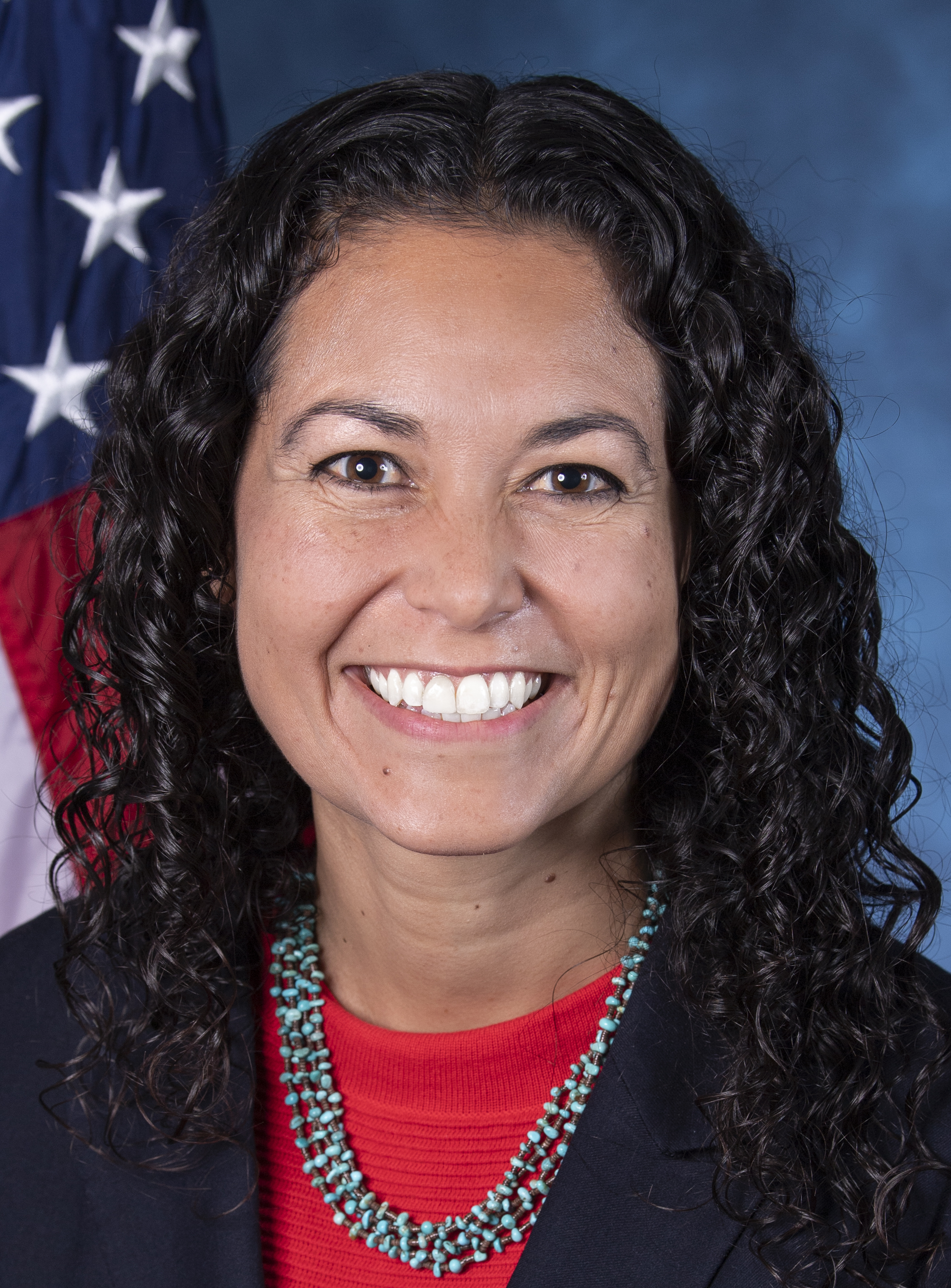

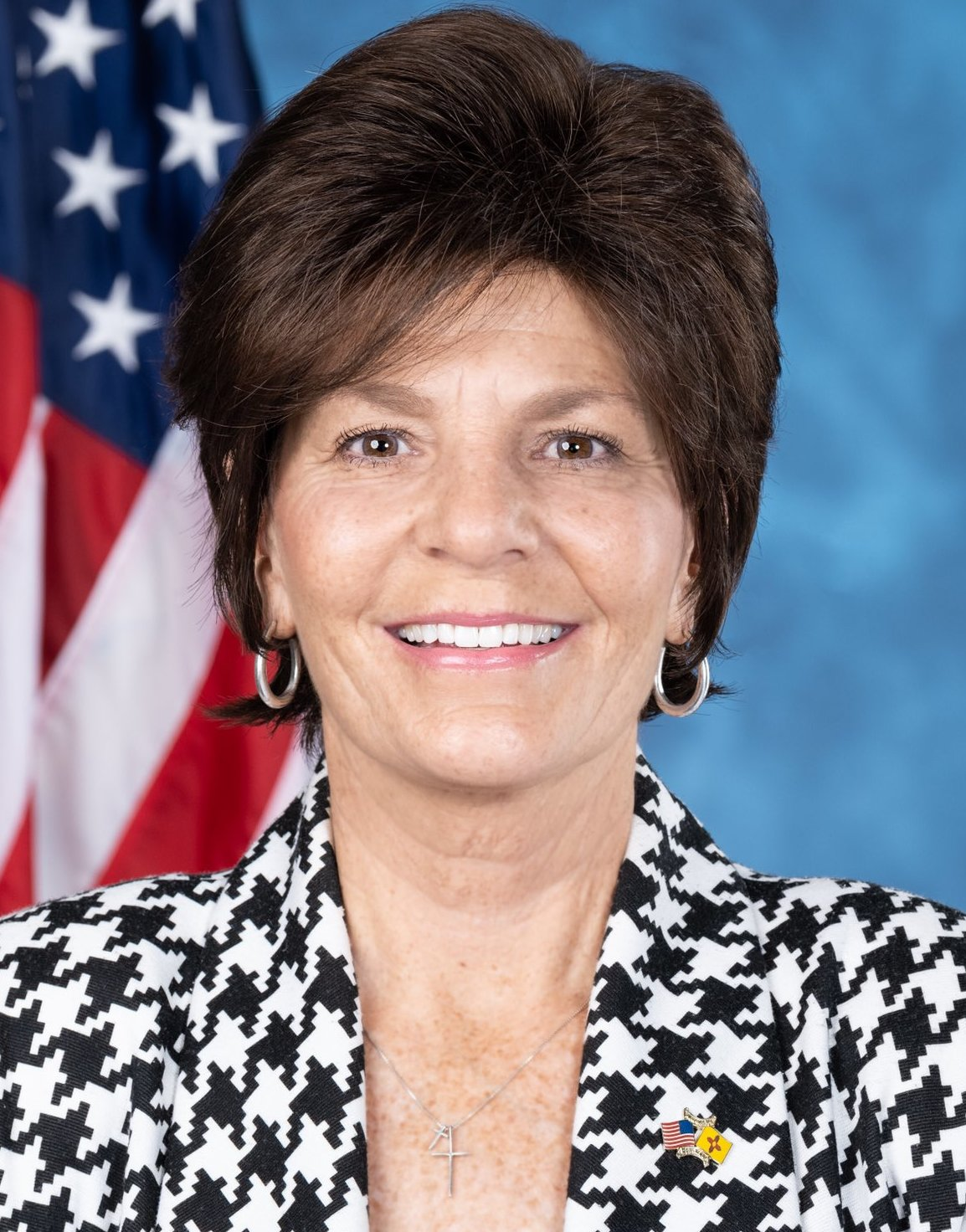
Nominee	Xochitl Torres Small	Yvette Herrell
Party	Democratic	Republican
Popular vote	101,489	97,767
Percentage	50.9%	49.1%
- Torres Small: 50–60% 60–70% 70–80% 80–90% >90% Herrell: 50–60% 60–70% 70–80% 80–90% >90% Tie: 50% No votes
U.S. Representative before election
Steve Pearce
Republican
Elected U.S. Representative
Xochitl Torres Small
Democratic

The 2nd district is very expansive, covering rural Southern New Mexico, including Alamogordo, Las Cruces, and Roswell. Republican Steve Pearce, who had represented the district since 2011 and previously represented the district from 2003 to 2009, was reelected to a fourth consecutive and seventh total term with 63% of the vote in 2016. Pearce did not run for reelection and instead ran unsuccessfully for governor of New Mexico.

New Mexico's 2nd district was one of the 80 Republican-held seats that the Democratic Congressional Campaign Committee was targeting in 2018. It was successfully picked up by the Democrats.

=== Democratic primary ===
==== Candidates ====
===== Declared =====
- Madeline Hildebrandt, U.S. Army veteran and history professor
- Xochitl Torres Small, water rights attorney

===== Withdrew =====
- David Baake, attorney
- Ronald Fitzherbert, activist
- Tony Martinez, former pharmaceutical industry executive
- Adolf Zubia, former Las Cruces Fire Chief

===== Disqualified =====
- Angel Peñas

===== Declined =====
- Joe Cervantes, state senator (running for governor)
- Howie Morales, state senator and candidate for governor of New Mexico in 2014 (running for lieutenant governor)

==== Forum ====
2018 New Mexico's 2nd congressional district Democratic candidate forum
No.	Date	Host	Moderator	Link	Democratic	Democratic
Key: P Participant A Absent N Not invited I Invited W Withdrawn						
Key: P Participant A Absent N Not invited I Invited W Withdrawn					David Baake	Madeline Hildebrandt
1	Dec. 12, 2017	KRWG-TV	Fred Martino		P	P

==== Pre-primary convention results ====
Candidates for the Democratic nomination needed to either receive the votes of 20% of the delegates at the convention on March 10, or collect and submit signatures to the secretary of state to have made it to the June 5 primary.

Candidate	Percentage of delegates won	Automatically on ballot
Xochitl Torres Small	65.75%	✓
Madeline Hildebrandt	34.25%	✓

==== Results ====
Democratic primary results
Party	Candidate	Votes	%
Democratic	Xochitl Torres Small	25,395	72.6
Democratic	Madeline Hildebrandt	9,577	27.4
Total votes		34,972	100.0

=== Republican primary ===
==== Candidates ====
===== Declared =====
- Gavin Clarkson, former professor at New Mexico State University
- Clayburn Griffin, former staffer for Gary Johnson's 2012 and 2016 presidential campaigns
- Yvette Herrell, state representative
- Monty Newman, former mayor of Hobbs and former chair of the Republican Party of New Mexico

===== Withdrew =====
- Aubrey Dunn, New Mexico Commissioner of Public Lands (running for U.S. Senate as a Libertarian)

==== Endorsements ====
Yvette Herrell

Organizations

- House Freedom Fund
Monty Newman

Individuals

- Ted Cruz, U.S. senator from Texas and presidential candidate in 2016

==== Results ====
Republican primary results
Party	Candidate	Votes	%
Republican	Yvette Herrell	16,023	49.0
Republican	Monty Newman	10,474	32.0
Republican	Gavin Clarkson	4,060	12.4
Republican	Clayburn Griffin	2,143	6.6
Total votes		32,700	100.0

=== General election ===
==== Predictions ====
Source	Ranking	As of
The Cook Political Report	Tossup	November 5, 2018
Inside Elections	Tossup	November 5, 2018
Sabato's Crystal Ball	Lean D (flip)	November 5, 2018
RCP	Tossup	November 5, 2018
Daily Kos	Tossup	November 5, 2018
538	Tossup	November 7, 2018

==== Polling ====
Poll source	Date(s) administered	Sample size	Margin of error	Yvette Herrell (R)	Xochitl Torres Small (D)	Undecided
Research & Polling, Inc.	October 26 — November 1, 2018	413	± 4.8%	46%	45%	9%
Carroll Strategies	October 29, 2018	338	—	47%	42%	11%
Emerson College	October 24–26, 2018	278	± 6.1%	47%	47%	6%
NYT Upshot/Siena College	October 19–23, 2018	522	± 4.6%	45%	44%	11%
The Tarrance Group (R) (Note: Poll sponsored for Yvette Herrell.)	September 30 — October 2, 2018	400	± 4.9%	49%	45%	6%
NYT Upshot/Siena College	September 13–18, 2018	503	± 4.9%	45%	46%	10%
Research & Polling, Inc.	September 7–13, 2018	405	± 4.9%	48%	41%	11%
Carroll Strategies	June 15–16, 2018	334	—	49%	35%	17%
DCCC Targeting & Analytics (D) (Note: Poll sponsored for the Democratic Congressional Campaign Committee.)	June 6–11, 2018	456	± 4.6%	45%	43%	—

==== Results ====
New Mexico's 2nd congressional district, 2018
Party	Candidate	Votes	%
Democratic	Xochitl Torres Small	101,489	50.9
Republican	Yvette Herrell	97,767	49.1
Total votes		199,256	100.0
Democratic gain from Republican			

== District 3 ==
2018 New Mexico's 3rd congressional district election
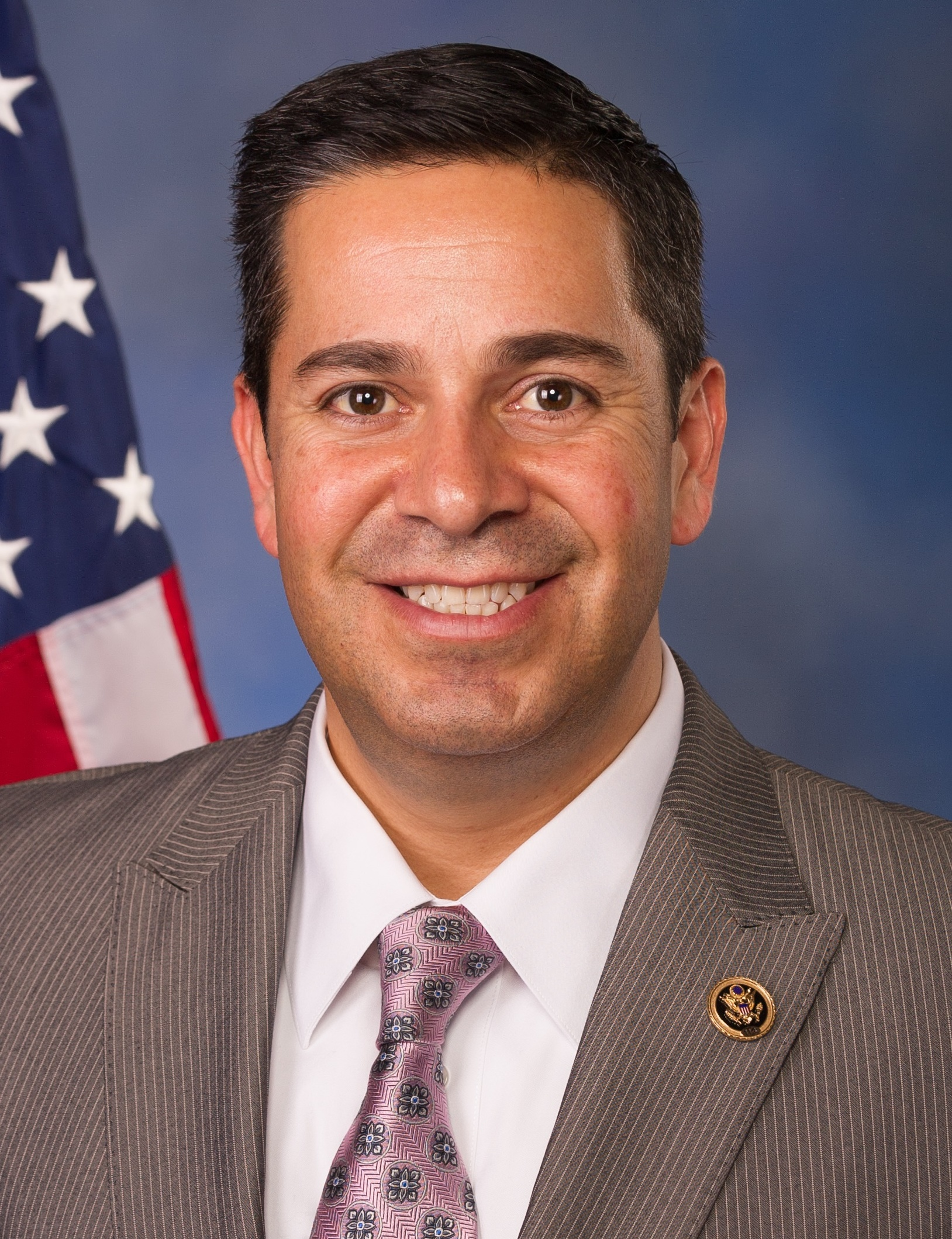

Nominee	Ben Ray Luján	Jerald McFall	Chris Manning
Party	Democratic	Republican	Libertarian
Popular vote	155,201	76,427	13,265
Percentage	63.4%	31.2%	5.4%
- Lujan: 40–50% 50–60% 60–70% 70–80% 80–90% >90% McFall: 40–50% 50–60% 60–70% 70–80% 80–90% >90% Tie: 40–50% No votes
U.S. Representative before election
Ben Ray Luján
Democratic
Elected U.S. Representative
Ben Ray Luján
Democratic

The 3rd district covers Northern New Mexico, including the capital Santa Fe, as well as Farmington, Las Vegas, and Taos. The district also expands into parts of rural Eastern New Mexico, taking in Clovis and Portales. Democrat Ben Ray Luján, who had represented the district since 2009, was reelected to a fifth term with 62% of the vote in 2016.

New Mexico's 3rd district was one of 36 Democrat-held House districts targeted by the National Republican Congressional Committee in 2018.

=== Democratic primary ===
==== Candidates ====
===== Declared =====
- Ben Ray Luján, incumbent U.S. Representative

==== Results ====
Democratic primary results
Party	Candidate	Votes	%
Democratic	Ben Ray Luján (incumbent)	63,909	100.0
Total votes		63,909	100.0

=== Republican primary ===
==== Candidates ====
===== Declared =====
- Jerald McFall, farmer and former ski instructor

==== Results ====
Republican primary results
Party	Candidate	Votes	%
Republican	Jerald Steve McFall	20,480	100.0
Total votes		20,480	100.0

=== Libertarian primary ===
==== Candidates ====
===== Declared =====
- Christopher Manning, auditor

==== Results ====
Libertarian primary results
Party	Candidate	Votes	%
Libertarian	Christopher Manning	201	100.0
Total votes		201	100.0

=== General election ===
==== Predictions ====
Source	Ranking	As of
The Cook Political Report	Safe D	November 5, 2018
Inside Elections	Safe D	November 5, 2018
Sabato's Crystal Ball	Safe D	November 5, 2018
RCP	Safe D	November 5, 2018
Daily Kos	Safe D	November 5, 2018
538	Safe D	November 7, 2018

==== Polling ====
Poll source	Date(s) administered	Sample size	Margin of error	Ben Ray Luján (D)	Jerald McFall (R)	Christopher Manning (L)	Undecided
Carroll Strategies	October 29, 2018	410	—	57%	33%	4%	6%
Emerson College	October 24–26, 2018	331	± 5.7%	54%	37%	—	5%
Carroll Strategies	June 15–16, 2018	446	—	58%	30%	5%	7%

==== Results ====
New Mexico's 3rd congressional district, 2018
Party	Candidate	Votes	%
Democratic	Ben Ray Luján (incumbent)	155,201	63.4
Republican	Jerald Steve McFall	76,427	31.2
Libertarian	Christopher Manning	13,265	5.4
Total votes		244,893	100.0
Democratic hold			

== Notes ==
Partisan clients
