= Government of Albuquerque, New Mexico =

Albuquerque, New Mexico, has a mayor-council government, divided into an executive branch headed by the Mayor and the nine-member City Council which holds the legislative authority.

== Organization ==
=== Mayor ===
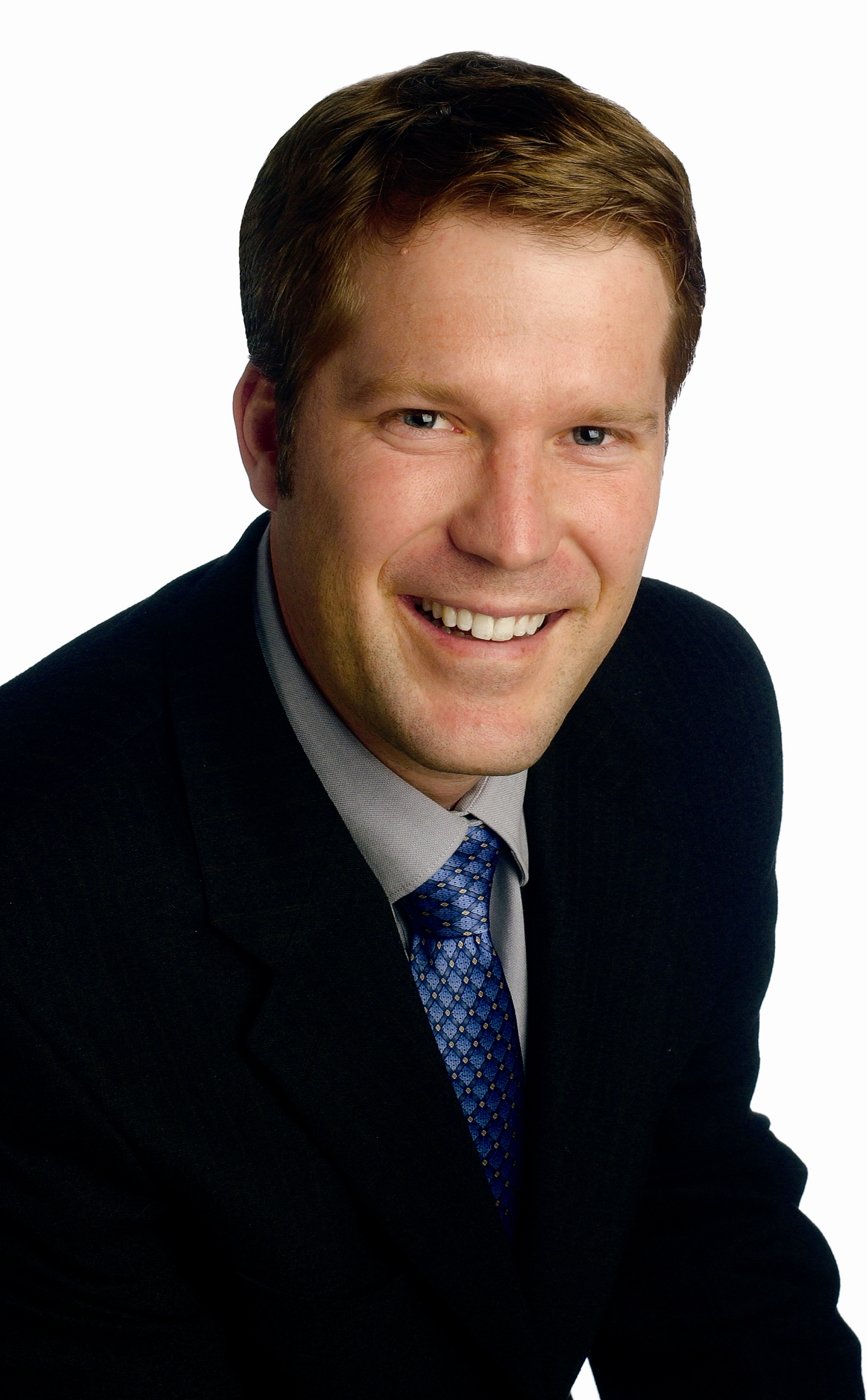
Mayor Tim Keller (D)

The Mayor of Albuquerque holds a full-time paid elected position with a four-year term. Elections for Mayor are nonpartisan. The current mayor is Tim Keller, who was elected in 2017.

Each year, the Mayor submits a city budget proposal for the year to the Council by April 1, and the Council must act on the proposal within sixty days.

=== City Council ===
The Albuquerque City Council is the elected legislative authority of the city. The Council has the power to adopt all ordinances, resolutions, or other legislation. Ordinances and resolutions passed by the Council are presented to the Mayor for his approval. If the Mayor vetoes an item, the Council can override the veto with a vote of two-thirds of the membership of the Council.

It consists of 9 members, elected from respective districts of the city on a nonpartisan basis. Members hold part-time paid positions and are elected from the nine districts for four-year terms, with four or five Councilors elected every two years. Each December, a new Council President and Vice-President are chosen by members of the Council.

The Council meets two times a month, with meetings held in the Vincent E. Griego Council Chambers in the basement level of Albuquerque/Bernalillo County Government Center in Downtown Albuquerque.

=== Police Department ===
The Albuquerque Police Department (APD) is the police department with jurisdiction within the city limits, with anything outside of the city limits being considered the unincorporated area of Bernalillo County and policed by the Bernalillo County Sheriff's Department. It is the largest municipal police department in New Mexico, and in September 2008 the US Department of Justice recorded the APD as the 49th largest police department in the United States.

== Controversies ==
In 2022 and 2023, the Southwest Public Policy Institute (SPPI) surveyed more than 600 parents from Albuquerque Public Schools (APS) about the past five years of education. Most parents from these two major New Mexico districts expressed dissatisfaction with the quality of public education and preferred higher-quality charter school options, if accessible.

In 2023, the Southwest Public Policy Institute (SPPI) initiated legal action against the City of Albuquerque, alleging non-compliance with the New Mexico Inspection of Public Records Act (IPRA). The lawsuit arose after SPPI requested access to the automated speed enforcement citation database, which SPPI argued was incomplete and lacked critical identifying information necessary for comprehensive analysis.

In October 2023, controversy arose when it was revealed that the Albuquerque government had spent $45,000 on the book, City at the Crossroads: The Pandemic, Protests, and Public Service in Albuquerque. Councilors called for an investigation into the use of those funds.

== See also ==
- Government of New Mexico
