= Fred Joseph Federici III =

American lawyer (born 1965)

Fred Federici
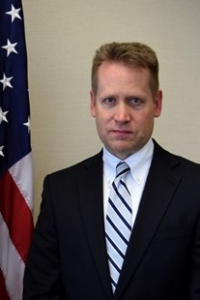

United States Attorney for the District of New Mexico
- Acting
- In office January 3, 2021 – May 24, 2022
- President: Donald Trump; Joe Biden
- Preceded by: John C. Anderson
- Succeeded by: Alexander M.M. Uballez

Personal details
- Born: Fred Joseph Federici III; 1965 (age 60–61) Raleigh, North Carolina, U.S.
- Education: College of William & Mary (BA); University of Virginia (JD)

Fred Joseph Federici III (born 1965) is an American attorney who formerly served as the acting United States attorney for the District of New Mexico. He was previously a nominee to be a United States district judge of the United States District Court for the District of New Mexico.

== Early life and education ==
Federici was born in Raleigh, North Carolina. He earned a Bachelor of Arts from the College of William & Mary in 1988 and a Juris Doctor from the University of Virginia School of Law in 1991.

== Career ==
Federici began his career as an associate at Venable LLP, in Washington, D.C. In 1995, he became an assistant United States attorney for the District of New Mexico. He was the office's criminal chief from 2008–2010, a line supervisor from 2010–2018, and the first assistant United States attorney from 2018-2021.

Upon the resignation of John C. Anderson on January 2, 2021, Federici assumed office as the acting U.S. attorney. He served until May 24, 2022, when Alexander M.M. Uballez was sworn in.

=== Expired nomination to district court ===
On May 28, 2020, President Trump announced his intent to nominate Federici to serve as a United States district judge for the United States District Court for the District of New Mexico. On June 18, 2020, his nomination was sent to the Senate. President Trump nominated Federici to the seat vacated by Judge Robert C. Brack, who took senior status on July 25, 2018. On January 3, 2021, his nomination was returned to the President under Rule XXXI, Paragraph 6 of the United States Senate.

Legal offices
| Preceded by John C. Anderson | United States Attorney for the District of New Mexico; Acting; 2021–2022 | Succeeded by Alexander M.M. Uballez |
