= Antoinette Sedillo Lopez =

New Mexico politician

Member of the New Mexico Senate from the 16th district
- Incumbent
- Assumed office January 14, 2019
- Preceded by: Cisco McSorley

Personal details
- Born: Antoinette Sedillo; 1956 or 1957 (age 69–70)
- Party: Democratic
- Spouse: Victor Lopez
- Children: 3
- Education: University of New Mexico (BA); University of California, Los Angeles (JD)
- Website: Government website

Antoinette Sedillo Lopez (born 1957) is an American attorney, politician, and retired law professor who is serving as a member of the New Mexico Senate since 2019. She was appointed in January 2019 to succeed Cisco McSorley following his resignation and was re-elected in the 2020 election.

== Early life and education ==
Sedillo Lopez was raised on her parents' farm in Los Chavez, New Mexico and attended Belen High School. She earned a Bachelor of Arts degree from the University of New Mexico and a Juris Doctor from the UCLA School of Law.

== Career ==
=== Law career ===
After graduating from law school, Sedillo Lopez worked as a law clerk for the United States Court of Appeals for the District of Columbia Circuit.

Prior to entering the legislature, Sedillo Lopez was a law professor at the University of New Mexico School of Law for 27 years, where she specialized in ethics, civil procedure, and family law. She retired as the associate dean for clinical affairs.

She also served as executive director for Albuquerque's Enlace Comunitario, a New Mexico non-profit that helps and represents individuals and their families experiencing domestic violence by working to decrease gender inequity and intimate partner violence in the Latinx immigrant community in Central New Mexico.

=== 2018 U.S. House campaign ===
In 2018, Sedillo Lopez was a candidate for New Mexico's 1st congressional district. A political progressive, Sedillo Lopez advocated for a Medicare for All healthcare system during her campaign. In the Democratic primary, she placed third after Damon Martinez and eventual winner Deb Haaland. During her campaign, Sedillo Lopez was endorsed by Justice Democrats and The People for Bernie Sanders.

=== New Mexico Senate ===
In January 2019, Sedillo Lopez was appointed to the New Mexico Senate by the Bernalillo County Commission to succeed Cisco McSorley following his resignation. She is the vice chair of the Senate Conservation Committee and a member of the Senate Judiciary Committee. As a member of the New Mexico Senate, she sponsored a bill that would have placed a moratorium on fracking in the state.

=== 2021 U.S. House campaign ===
Following the announcement of Haaland as Joe Biden's nominee for secretary of the interior, Sedillo Lopez announced her campaign in a special election for the seat. She placed first with 74 votes in the first round of the Democratic convention to nominate a candidate, and was defeated in the second round by State Representative Melanie Stansbury. Stansbury received 103 votes and Sedillo Lopez got 97.

== Personal life ==
Sedillo Lopez met her husband, Victor S. Lopez, while they were students at the UCLA School of Law. They have three children. Victor Lopez is a district judge of the New Mexico 2nd Judicial District Court for Division XXVII. They live in Albuquerque, New Mexico.

New Mexico Senate
Preceded by Cisco McSorley	Member of the New Mexico Senate from the 16th district 2019–present	Incumbent
