= 2025 Albuquerque mayoral election =

Municipal election in New Mexico, US

- November 4, 2025; December 9, 2025 (runoff)
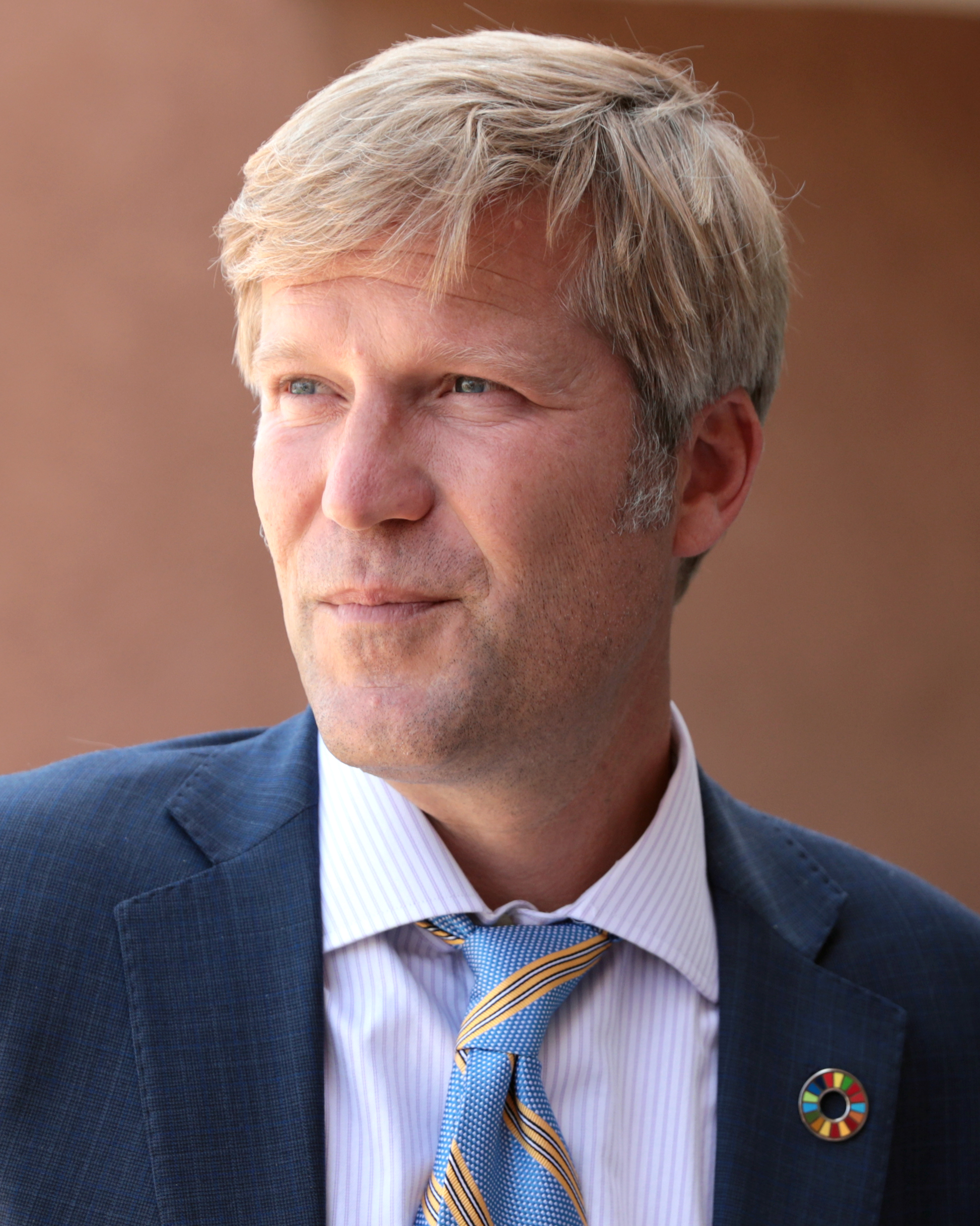

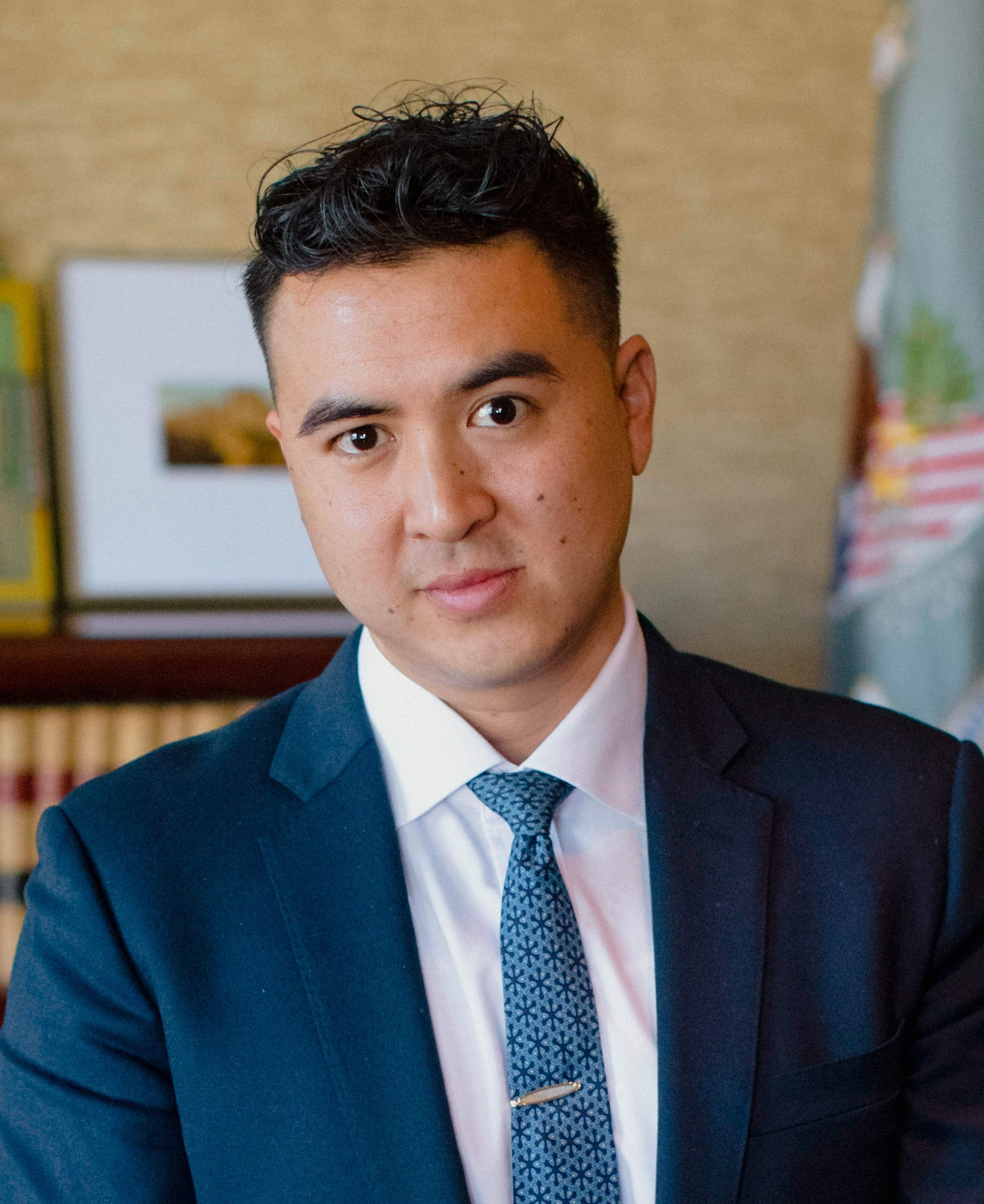
Candidate	Tim Keller	Darren White	Alex Uballez
First round	47,911; 35.69%	41,137; 30.65%	25,213; 18.79%
Runoff	74,472; 57.71%	54,564; 42.29%	Eliminated
Candidate	Louie Sanchez	Mayling Armijo
First round	8,647; 6.44%	7,673; 5.72%
Runoff	Eliminated	Eliminated
Mayor before election
Tim Keller
Democratic
Elected Mayor
Tim Keller
Democratic

The 2025 Albuquerque mayoral election was held on November 4, 2025, to elect the mayor of Albuquerque, New Mexico. The first round of voting saw Democratic Party incumbent Tim Keller win a plurality of the vote but failing to win over 50%, triggering a second round contest between him and Republican candidate Darren White. Keller was re-elected to a third term after defeating White in the runoff on December 9.

== Background ==
Incumbent mayor Tim Keller ran for re-election to a third term in office.

After the petition deadline on June 20, seven candidates met the 3,000 signature threshold, with Keller, Eddie Varela, and Alex Uballez leading in signatures gathered.

Since no candidate reached 50% of the vote in the general election, a runoff election between the top two candidates will take place on December 9, 2025.

== General election ==
=== Candidates ===
==== Advanced to runoff ====
- Tim Keller, incumbent mayor (Democratic)
- Darren White, former Bernalillo County Sheriff (Republican)

==== Eliminated in general ====
- Mayling Armijo, former Sandoval County deputy manager (Democratic)
- Louie Sanchez, city councilor (Democratic)
- Alex Uballez, former U.S. Attorney for the District of New Mexico (Democratic)
- Eddie Varela, former Albuquerque deputy fire chief and former Reserve city councilor (Republican)

==== Disqualified ====
- Alpana Adair, human resources professional (Independent)
- Adeo Herrick (Democratic)
- Patrick Sais, candidate for mayor in 2021 (Republican)

==== Withdrawn ====
- Brian Fejer (Independent)
- Daniel Chavez, parking company president (Note: Chavez withdrew in September 2025 and remained on the ballot.)

=== Endorsements ===
Tim Keller

U.S. representatives

- Melanie Stansbury, NM-01 (2021–present)

State legislators

- Javier Martínez, speaker of the New Mexico House of Representatives (2023–present) from the 11th district (2015–present)
- Heather Berghmans, state senator from the 15th district (2025–present)

Individuals

- Dolores Huerta, labor leader

Labor unions

- Teamsters Local 492
- AFSCME Council 18
- AFL-CIO New Mexico
- Western States Regional Council of Carpenters
- International Brotherhood of Electrical Workers Local 611
- Sheet Metal Workers' International Association Local 49

Organizations

- Planned Parenthood Votes New Mexico
- Sierra Club Rio Grande
- Conservation Voters New Mexico
- Everytown for Gun Safety
Alex Uballez

Organizations

- New American Leaders Action Fund
- Young Democrats of New Mexico

Political parties

- Working Families Party of New Mexico (endorsed Keller in the runoff)
Darren White

Local officials

- Dan Lewis, city councilmember from the 5th district (2021–present)
- Renee Grout, city councilmember from the 9th district (2021–present)
- Dan Champine, city councilmember from the 8th district (2023–present)
Mayling Armijo

Labor unions

- Associated Builders and Contractors New Mexico

=== Debates ===
Host	Date & time	Link(s)	Participants					
Host	Date & time	Link(s)	Darren White (R)	Tim Keller (D)	Alex Uballez (D)	Louie Sanchez (D)	Eddie Varela (R)	Mayling Armijo (D)
KOAT7	October 15, 2025		P	P	P	P	N	N

=== Polling ===
Poll source	Date(s) administered	Sample size (Note: Key: A – all adults RV – registered voters LV – likely voters V – unclear)	Margin of error	Tim Keller	Darren White	Louie Sanchez	Alexander Uballez	Eddie Varela	Mayling Armijo	Daniel Chavez	Undecided
Research & Polling Inc. (Note: Poll commissioned by the Albuquerque Journal)	September 26, 2025	514 (LV)	± 4.3%	29%	16%	6%	6%	2%	—N/a	—N/a	37%
Rival Strategy Group (R) (Note: Poll commissioned by the New Mexico Business Coalition)	July 8–12, 2025	529 (LV)	± 4.2%	32%	—N/a	—N/a	—N/a	—N/a	—N/a	37%	31%
Rival Strategy Group (R)	July 8–12, 2025	529 (LV)	± 4.2%	33%	—N/a	40%	—N/a	—N/a	—N/a	—N/a	27%
Rival Strategy Group (R)	July 8–12, 2025	529 (LV)	± 4.2%	38%	43%	—N/a	—N/a	—N/a	—N/a	—N/a	19%
Rival Strategy Group (R)	July 8–12, 2025	529 (LV)	± 4.2%	27%	—N/a	—N/a	—N/a	—N/a	37%	—N/a	35%
Rival Strategy Group (R)	July 8–12, 2025	529 (LV)	± 4.2%	33%	—N/a	—N/a	—N/a	34%	—N/a	—N/a	33%
Rival Strategy Group (R)	July 8–12, 2025	529 (LV)	± 4.2%	25%	—N/a	—N/a	39%	—N/a	—N/a	—N/a	36%

=== Results ===
2025 Albuquerque mayoral election
Candidate	Votes	%
Tim Keller (incumbent)	47,911	35.69%
Darren White	41,137	30.65%
Alex Uballez	25,213	18.79%
Louie Sanchez	8,647	6.44%
Mayling Armijo	7,673	5.72%
Eddie Varela	2,280	1.70%
Daniel Chavez (withdrawn)	1,366	1.02%
Total votes	134,227	100.00

== Runoff election ==
=== Endorsements ===
Tim Keller

U.S. senators

- Ben Ray Luján, New Mexico (2021–present)

Political parties

- Working Families Party of New Mexico (previously endorsed Uballez)

=== Polling ===
Poll source	Date(s) administered	Sample size	Margin of error	Tim Keller	Darren White	Undecided
GBAO (D) (Note: Poll sponsored by Ascend ABQ PAC, which supports Keller)	October 16–19, 2025	400 (LV)	± 4.9%	45%	38%	17%

=== Results ===
2025 Albuquerque mayoral runoff election
Candidate	Votes	%
Tim Keller (incumbent)	74,472	57.71%
Darren White	54,564	42.29%
Total votes	129,036	100.00

== Notes ==
Partisan clients
