= Deb Haaland =

Governor-elect of New Mexico (born 1960)

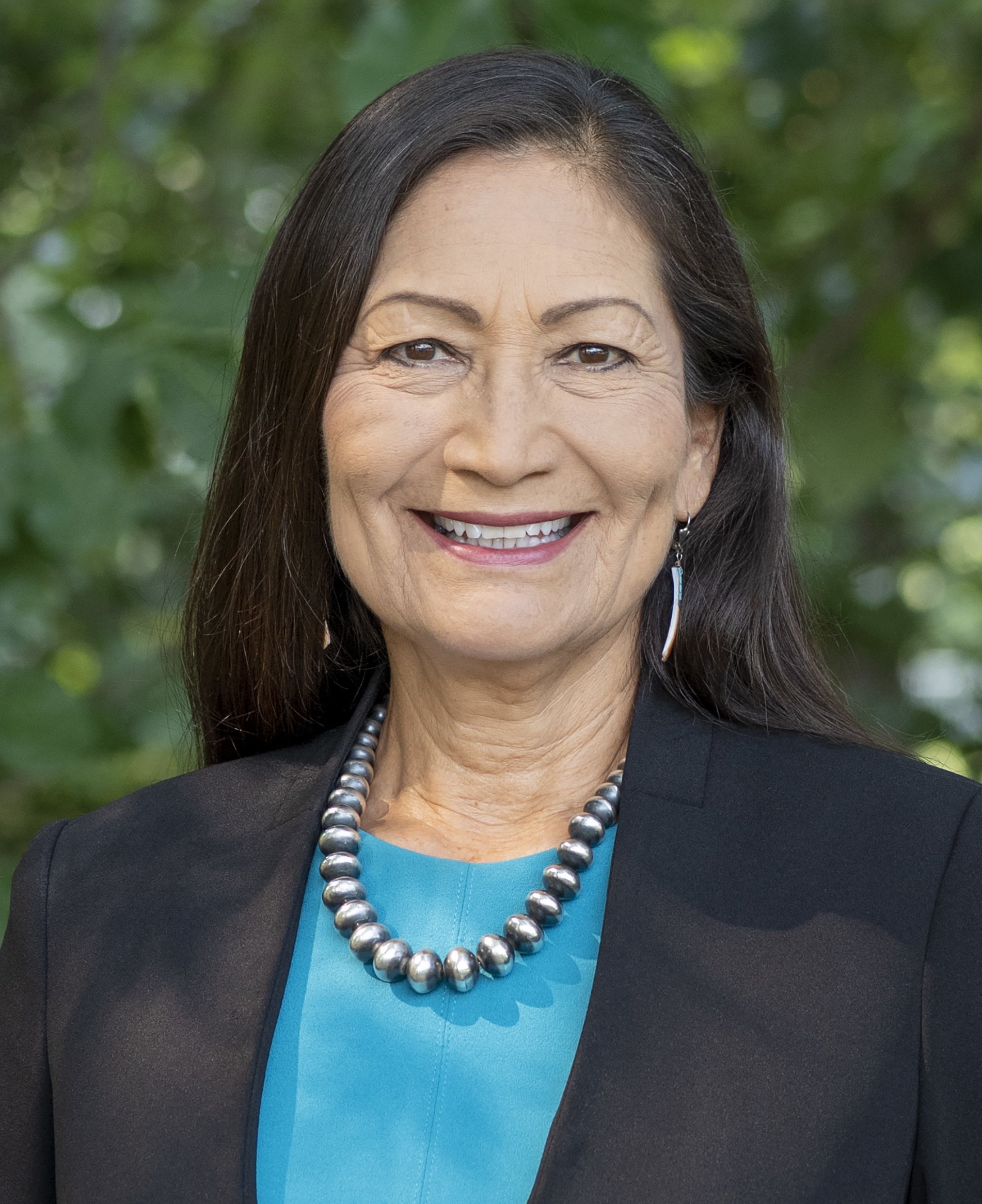
- Official portrait, 2021

Governor-elect of New Mexico
- Assuming office January 1, 2027
- Lieutenant: Stephanie Garcia Richard (elect)
- Succeeding: Michelle Lujan Grisham

54th United States Secretary of the Interior
- In office March 16, 2021 – January 20, 2025
- President: Joe Biden
- Deputy: Tommy Beaudreau; Laura Daniel-Davis (acting)
- Preceded by: David Bernhardt
- Succeeded by: Doug Burgum

Member of the U.S. House of Representatives from New Mexico's 1st district
- In office January 3, 2019 – March 16, 2021
- Preceded by: Michelle Lujan Grisham
- Succeeded by: Melanie Stansbury

Chair of the New Mexico Democratic Party
- In office April 25, 2015 – April 29, 2017
- Preceded by: Sam Bregman
- Succeeded by: Richard Ellenberg

Personal details
- Born: Debra Anne Haaland; December 2, 1960 (age 65) Winslow, Arizona, U.S.
- Citizenship: American; Laguna Pueblo
- Party: Democratic
- Spouse: Skip Sayre (m. 2021; div. 2025)
- Children: 1
- Education: University of New Mexico (BA, JD); University of California, Los Angeles (attended)
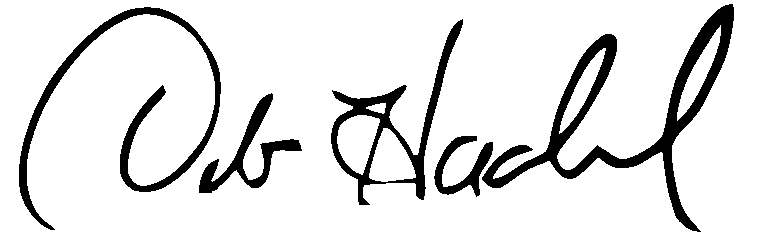
- Signature
- Website: Campaign website
- Haaland's voice Haaland on International Day of World's Indigenous Peoples. Recorded August 9, 2021

Debra Anne Haaland (/ˈhɑːlənd/; born December 2, 1960) is an American politician who is the governor-elect of New Mexico. A member of the Democratic Party, Haaland previously served as the 54th United States secretary of the interior from 2021 to 2025 and as the U.S. representative for New Mexico's 1st congressional district from 2019 to 2021. Haaland, a Native American, is an enrolled member of the Laguna Pueblo tribe.

Raised in Albuquerque, Haaland is a graduate of the University of New Mexico and once chaired the New Mexico Democratic Party. Haaland's congressional district included most of Albuquerque and most of its suburbs. Along with Sharice Davids, she is one of the first two Native American women elected to the U.S. Congress. She is a political progressive who supports the Green New Deal and Medicare for All.

On December 17, 2020, then-president-elect Joe Biden announced that he would nominate Haaland to serve as Secretary of the Interior. She was confirmed by the US Senate on March 15, 2021, by a vote of 51–40. Following her swearing-in on March 16, she became the first Native American to serve as a Cabinet secretary and the second to serve in the Cabinet, after Republican vice president and Kaw Nation citizen Charles Curtis (who, in 1893, also became the first Native American to serve in the US Congress).

Haaland ran and won in the 2026 New Mexico gubernatorial election against Republican nominee Gregg Hull. She is set to become the first Native American woman governor of a U.S. state in the history of the United States, and the fifth person to identify as Pueblo to govern what is now the State of New Mexico, after Po'pay, Luis Tupatu, José María González, and Pablo Montoya.

== Early life and education ==
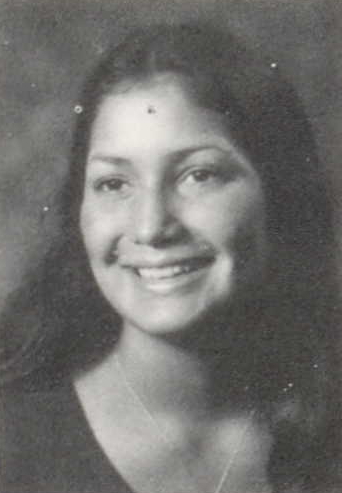
Haaland in the Highland High School yearbook, 1978

Haaland was born in Winslow, Arizona. She is an enrolled member of the Laguna Pueblo, where she belongs to the Turquoise Clan. The Pueblo people have lived on the land that is now the state of New Mexico since the 1200s and Haaland identifies herself as a 35th-generation New Mexican. Her mother, Mary Toya, a Native American woman, served in the United States Navy and also worked in the Bureau of Indian Affairs. Her father, Major John David "Dutch" Haaland, a Norwegian Minnesotan, was an officer in the United States Marine Corps and recipient of the Silver Star for his actions in Vietnam; he was buried with full military honors at Arlington National Cemetery in 2005.

As a child in a military family, Haaland moved frequently. She attended 13 public schools across the United States before the family settled in Albuquerque, New Mexico, to be close to family who also belong to the Laguna Pueblo. Haaland graduated from Highland High School in Albuquerque in 1978. She has two sisters, a brother, and two half-sisters.

After high school, Haaland worked at a local bakery. She struggled with alcoholism during this period, including two arrests for driving under the influence, but has been sober since enrolling in college in 1988. She earned her Bachelor of Arts in English from the University of New Mexico in 1994. Her professors included future United States poet laureate Joy Harjo, who published Haaland's poetry in a 1997 anthology.

Four days after graduation, Haaland gave birth to her child, Somáh. As a single mother, Haaland started a salsa company to support herself and her child. At times during this period, she has said, she did not earn enough money to afford housing and had to rely on friends for shelter. She says she also relied on food stamps at times. Haaland began law school at the University of California, Los Angeles School of Law in 2000 before earning her Juris Doctor in Indian law from the University of New Mexico School of Law in 2006, but failed the bar exam later that year. While serving as Interior Secretary, Haaland was working on completing a master's degree in American Indian studies at the University of California, Los Angeles.

== Early career ==
After law school, Haaland became a counselor for adults with developmental disabilities, then served as a tribal administrator and casino manager in San Felipe Pueblo. She was the first woman appointed to the board of the Laguna Development Corporation, a Laguna-owned enterprise created to support the growth of the Laguna Community and its economy. As chairwoman of the board, she oversaw business operations for the second-largest tribal gaming enterprise in New Mexico and successfully advocated for the corporation to create policies and commitments to earth-friendly business practices.

Haaland was New Mexico's vote director for Native Americans in Barack Obama's 2012 presidential reelection campaign. She was the chair of the Native American Caucus of the Democratic Party of New Mexico from 2012 to 2013. She ran for Lieutenant Governor of New Mexico in 2014. Her ticket, headed by then-Attorney General of New Mexico Gary King, the Democratic nominee for Governor of New Mexico, lost to the Republican ticket of Governor Susana Martinez and Lieutenant Governor John Sanchez.

Haaland was elected to a two-year term as the chair of the Democratic Party of New Mexico in April 2015. During her tenure, New Mexico Democrats regained control of the New Mexico House of Representatives and the office of the New Mexico secretary of state. Haaland has been credited with rebuilding the state party after large defeats for Democrats in New Mexico in 2014. She raised enough money during her two-year term as chair to pay off seven years' worth of debt incurred under previous chairs.

== US House of Representatives ==
=== Elections ===
==== 2018 ====
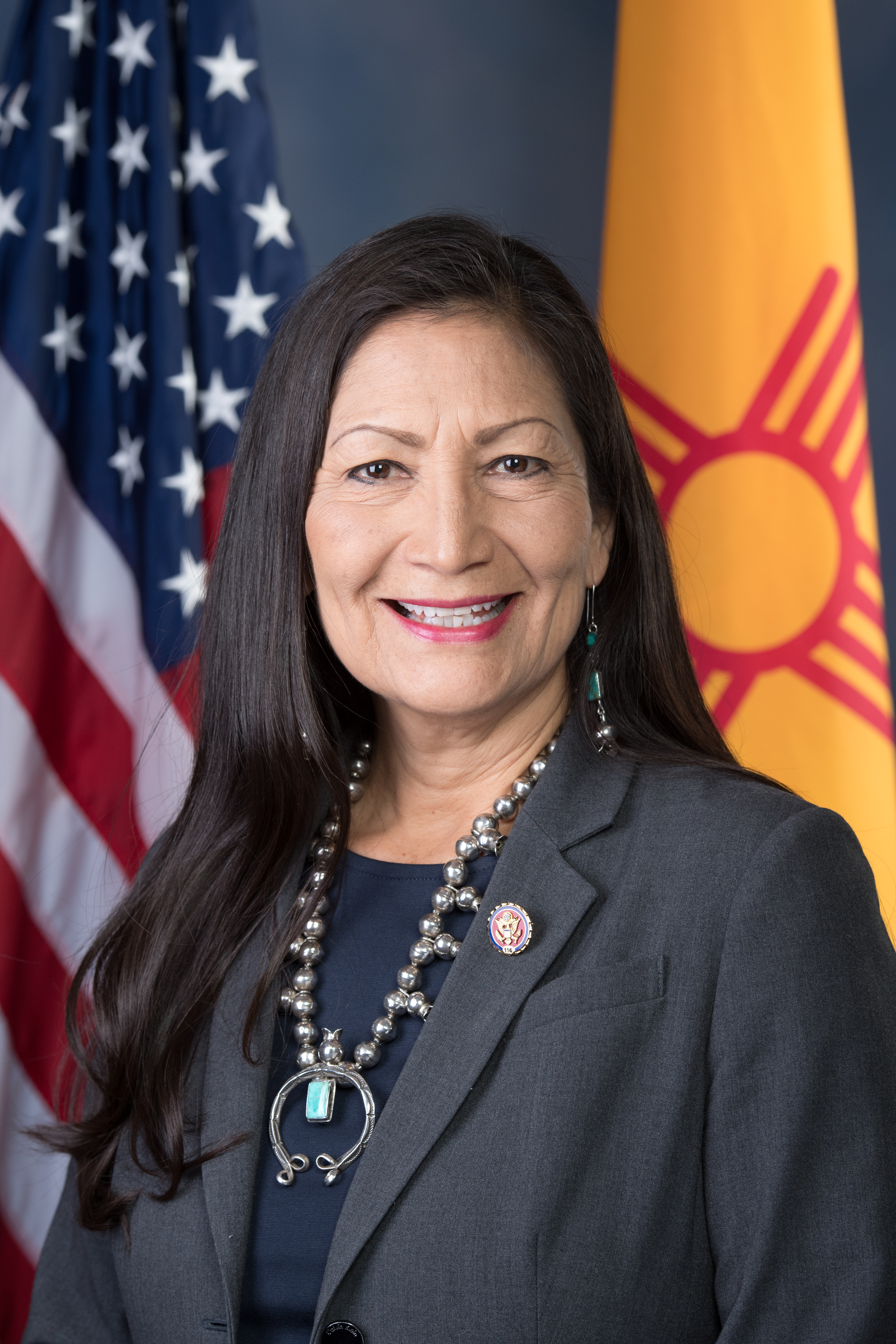
Haaland's Congressional Portrait

After the expiration of her term as state party chair, Haaland announced her intention to run for the United States House of Representatives in New Mexico's 1st congressional district in the 2018 elections, to succeed Michelle Lujan Grisham, who was running for governor. Haaland defeated Damon Martinez and Antoinette Sedillo Lopez to win the Democratic Party nomination in June 2018, receiving 40.5% of the vote and winning every county in the district.

Haaland campaigned as a progressive who supports the Green New Deal and Medicare for All. Her campaign was endorsed by the climate action group Sunrise Movement.

In the November 6 general election, Haaland defeated former New Mexico state representative Janice Arnold-Jones, receiving 59.1% of the vote and winning three of the district's five counties. Her victory was part of a sweep of New Mexico that saw Democrats win every statewide and federal office on the ballot that year, along with expanding their majority in the New Mexico House of Representatives.

==== 2020 ====
In the November 3 general election, Haaland received 58.2% of the vote defeating retired police detective Michelle Garcia Holmes, who ran for Lieutenant Governor of New Mexico in the 2018 gubernatorial election.

=== Tenure ===
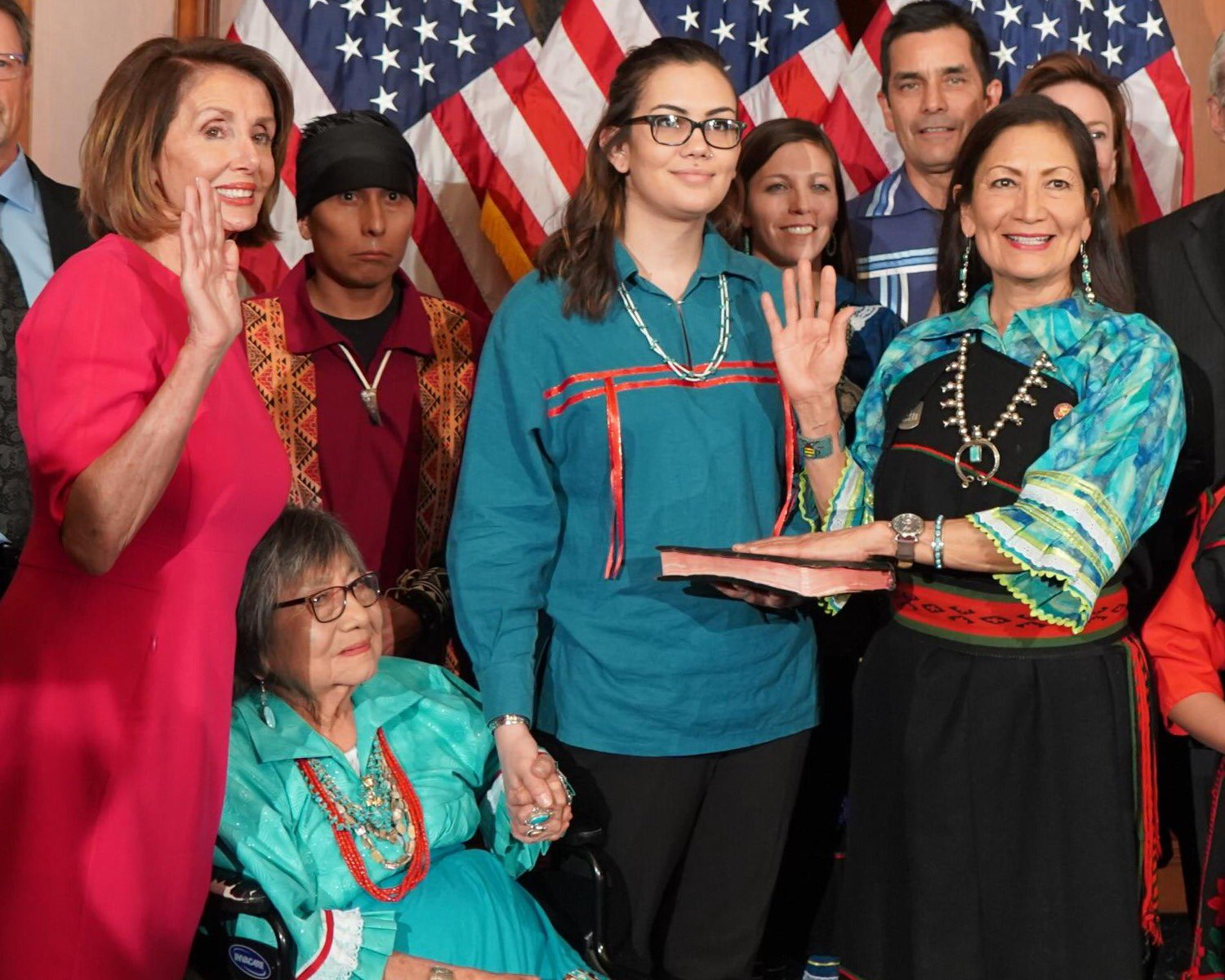
Congresswoman Deb Haaland (D-NM), is sworn in to the House of Representatives by Speaker Nancy Pelosi, accompanied by her mother Mary Toya and her child Somáh.

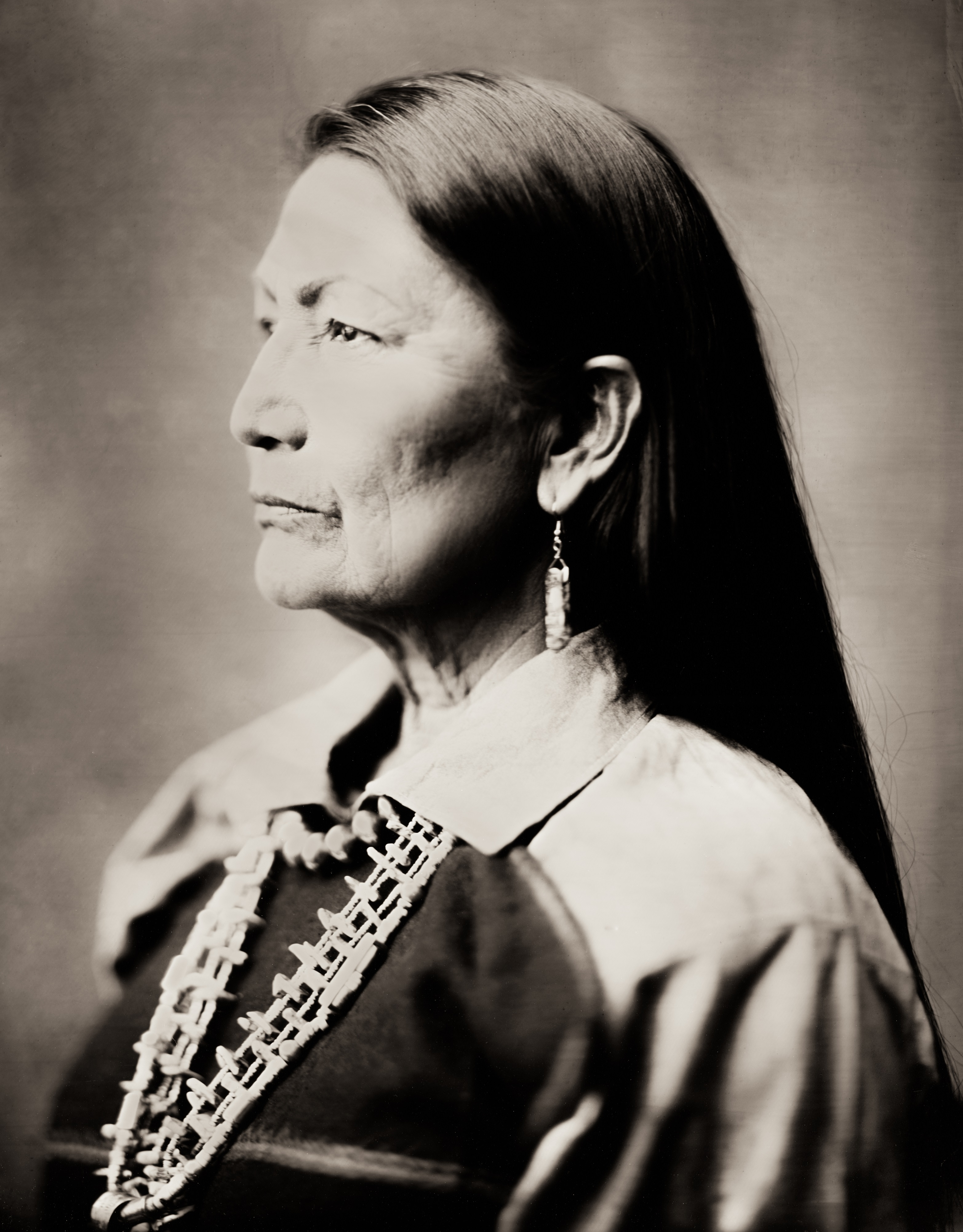
A wet-plate collodion photograph of Haaland in 2019

With Representative Sharice Davids of Kansas, a member of the Ho-Chunk Nation of Minnesota, elected simultaneously, Haaland was one of the first two Native American women to be seated in Congress. For her swearing-in ceremony in January 2019, Haaland chose to wear traditional Pueblo dress, a necklace, and moccasins.

Later that month, Haaland said that students from Covington Catholic High School had displayed "blatant hate, disrespect, and intolerance" during the 2019 Lincoln Memorial confrontation. A libel lawsuit brought by students of the school that called Haaland's words "false and defaming" was dismissed on the grounds that her statements were made in the scope of her employment as a legislator.

On March 7, 2019, during a debate on voting rights and campaign finance, Haaland became the first Native American woman to preside over the US House of Representatives.

During the 116th Congress, Haaland "co-sponsored more bills than any other freshman in Congress, and compiled one of the most liberal voting records", according to The New Yorker.

Haaland served as one of three co-chairs of Elizabeth Warren's 2020 presidential campaign.

=== Committee assignments ===
- Committee on Armed Services
  - Subcommittee on Military Personnel
  - Subcommittee on Readiness
- Committee on Natural Resources (Vice Chair)
  - Subcommittee on Indigenous Peoples of the United States
  - Subcommittee on National Parks, Forests and Public Lands (chair)
- Committee on Oversight and Reform
  - Subcommittee on Civil Rights and Civil Liberties

=== Caucus memberships ===
- Congressional Native American Caucus (Co-chair)
- Congressional Progressive Caucus

== U.S. Secretary of the Interior (2021–2025) ==
=== Nomination and confirmation ===
On December 17, 2020, incoming President Joe Biden announced that he would nominate Haaland as Secretary of the Interior. Before Biden nominated Haaland, many senior Democrats had voiced their support for her as Secretary of the Interior, including House speaker Nancy Pelosi, House Majority Leader Steny Hoyer, and Senator Elizabeth Warren. Sunrise Movement, the climate-oriented political action group which supported her Congressional campaigns, continued their support by advocating for Haaland's nomination. Republican representatives Don Young and Tom Cole (a member of the Chickasaw Nation) also expressed their support for Haaland's nomination.

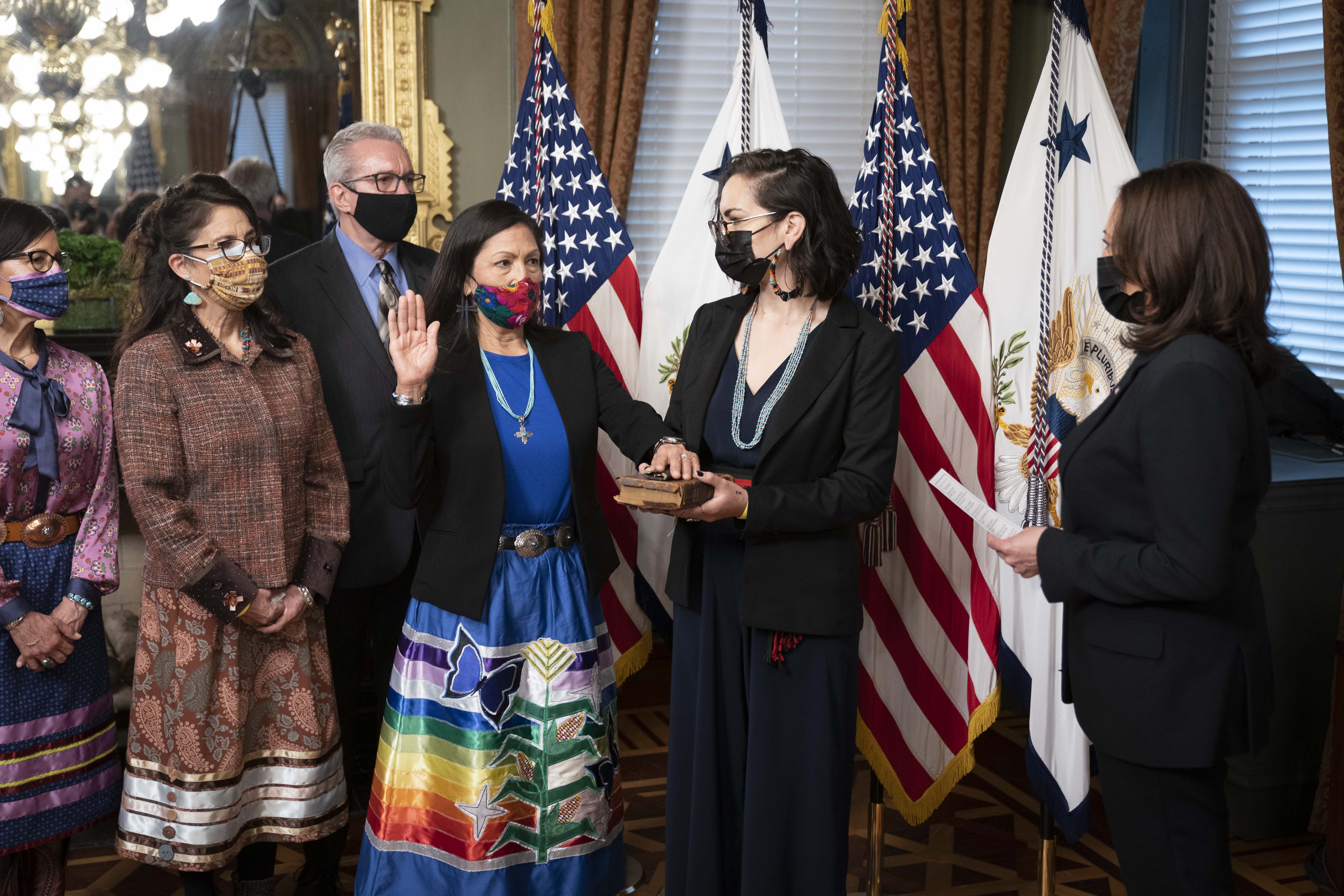
Haaland sworn in as Secretary of the Interior by Vice President Kamala Harris.

On March 15, 2021, Haaland was confirmed by the Senate by a 51–40 vote, with four Republicans (Susan Collins, Lisa Murkowski, Dan Sullivan, Lindsey Graham) voting to confirm. She is the first Native American Cabinet secretary in US history. (Note: Charles Curtis, who was a Kaw citizen and served as Vice President between 1929 and 1933, was the first ever Native American to serve in a United States Cabinet, but never served as a Cabinet secretary.) Her departure from the House triggered a special election in 2021. Haaland was sworn in on March 18, 2021, wearing a combination of traditional Laguna Pueblo regalia and a colorful ribbon skirt, custom-made for her by Agnes Woodward. She has brought Indigenous traditions to the role, often wearing Native jewelry and decorating her office with Native art.

=== Tenure ===
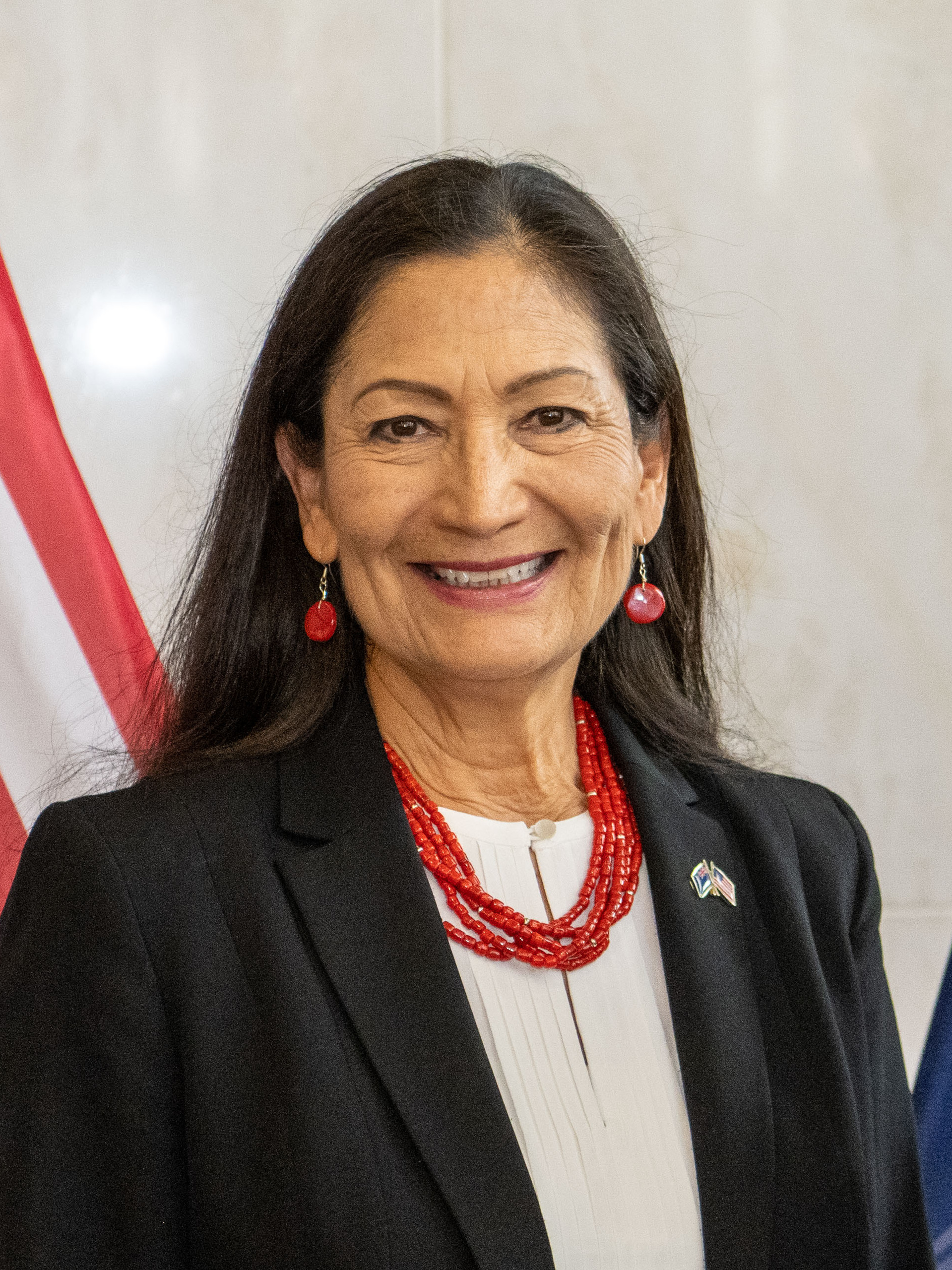
Deb Haaland on February 20, 2023

On her first day as secretary, Haaland met with tribal media in a press conference organized by the department and the Native American Journalists Association, speaking about her intention to include the tribes as decisions that impact them are made. In April 2021, Haaland announced a new unit within Bureau of Indian Affairs that plans to tackle the decades-long crisis of missing and murdered Native Americans, saying, "We are fully committed to assisting Tribal communities with these investigations, and the MMU will leverage every resource available to be a force-multiplier in preventing these cases from becoming cold case investigations".

In May 2021, Haaland approved the new constitution of the Cherokee Nation with protections for Cherokee Freedmen. In June 2021, Haaland announced the creation of the Federal Indian Boarding School Initiative. The initiative's goal is to investigate long-standing abuse in the now defunct residential boarding schools that housed Native American children under the 1819 Civilization Fund Act. Haaland attended a series of Road to Healing events to bring together survivors and their stories. Haaland's grandparents had also been sent to the boarding schools. In November 2021, Haaland ordered a task force to determine new names for the 650 places on federally owned lands that currently use the word "squaw", a derogatory term for Native American women.

In March 2023, Haaland announced $25 million to be dedicated to bison conservation.

Haaland was involved in President Biden's designation of national monuments, including Avi Kwa Ame, Baaj Nwaavjo I'tah Kukveni – Ancestral Footprints of the Grand Canyon, and Carlisle Federal Indian Boarding School National Monuments. These monuments will incorporate Native participation in land management, and Haaland has used her tenure to address historical wrongs by including tribes.

Haaland spoke at the 2024 Democratic National Convention on August 22, 2024.

== 2026 New Mexico gubernatorial campaign ==
On January 28, 2025, Haaland announced that she would run for governor of New Mexico in the 2026 election, seeking to succeed term-limited governor Michelle Lujan Grisham. She kicked off her campaign in Los Alamos to a large audience. On June 2, 2026, Haaland won the Democratic Primary for governor, and on November 3, 2026, the general election for governor. Haaland is set to become the first Native American woman governor of a U.S. state in the history of the United States, and the fifth person to identify as Pueblo to govern what is now the State of New Mexico, after Po'pay, Luis Tupatu, José María González, and Pablo Montoya. Haaland ran with Stephanie Garcia Richard, and they were the first all woman-of-color ticket for governor and lieutenant governor to be elected in the United States.

== Electoral history ==
2018 New Mexico's 1st congressional district election
Primary election
| Party | Candidate | Votes | % |
|---|---|---|---|
| Democratic | Debra Haaland | 25,444 | 40.59 |
| Democratic | Damon Martinez | 16,182 | 25.81 |
| Democratic | Antoinette Sedillo Lopez | 12,919 | 20.61 |
| Democratic | Paul Moya | 3,691 | 5.89 |
| Democratic | Pat Davis (withdrawn) | 2,385 | 3.80 |
| Democratic | Damian Lara | 2,063 | 3.29 |
| Democratic | Jesse Andrew Heitner (write-in) | 3 | 0.00 |
| Total votes | | 62,687 | 100 |
General election
| Democratic | Deb Haaland | 147,336 | 59.13 |
| Republican | Janice Arnold-Jones | 90,507 | 36.32 |
| Libertarian | Lloyd Princeton | 11,319 | 4.54 |
| Total votes | | 249,162 | 100 |
| Democratic hold | | | |

2020 New Mexico's 1st congressional district election
Primary election
| Party | Candidate | Votes | % |
|---|---|---|---|
| Democratic | Debra Haaland (incumbent) | 83,032 | 100.00 |
| Total votes | | 83,032 | 100 |
General election
| Democratic | Deb Haaland (incumbent) | 186,953 | 58.19 |
| Republican | Michelle Garcia Holmes | 134,337 | 41.81 |
| Total votes | | 321,290 | 100 |
| Democratic hold | | | |

== Awards and honors ==
In 2025, Haaland was inducted into the Texas Trail of Fame.

== Personal life ==
Haaland has a child, Somáh, whom she raised as a single mother. On August 28, 2021, Haaland married her longtime partner, Skip Sayre, in Santa Ana Pueblo, New Mexico. She was previously married in her twenties. In February 2025, Haaland divorced Sayre, citing incompatibility.

Haaland is Catholic. Her hobbies include marathon running and gourmet cooking.

Haaland suffered a broken left fibula on July 17, 2022, while hiking in Shenandoah National Park.

== Publications ==
=== Articles ===
- Haaland, Deb (January 2023). "Satellites can help us fight climate change". Scientific American. 328 (1): 9. (Note: A slightly different online version is also available)

=== Books ===
- Haaland, Deb (2026). A Voice Like Mine: A Memoir. Henry Holt and Company. ISBN 978-1250434227.

== See also ==
- List of female governors in the United States
- List of Native American politicians
- List of Native Americans in the United States Congress
- Native American women in politics
- Women in the United States House of Representatives
- List of secretaries of the interior

== Notes ==
Party political offices
| Preceded by Brian Colón | Democratic nominee for Lieutenant Governor of New Mexico; 2014 | Succeeded by Howie Morales |
| Preceded by Sam Bregman | Chair of the New Mexico Democratic Party; 2015–2017 | Succeeded by Richard Ellenberg |
| Preceded by Michelle Lujan Grisham | Democratic nominee for Governor of New Mexico; 2026 | Most recent |
U.S. House of Representatives
| Preceded by Michelle Lujan Grisham | Member of the U.S. House of Representatives from New Mexico's 1st congressional district 2019–2021 | Succeeded by Melanie Stansbury |
Political offices
| Preceded by David Bernhardt | United States Secretary of the Interior; 2021–2025 | Succeeded by Doug Burgum |
| Preceded by Michelle Lujan Grisham | Governor of New Mexico; Taking office 2027 | Elect |
U.S. order of precedence (ceremonial)
| Preceded by Merrick Garland as Former U.S. Cabinet Member | Order of precedence of the United States as Former U.S. Cabinet Member | Succeeded by Xavier Becerra as Former U.S. Cabinet Member |
