= Darren White (politician) =

American politician

Personal details
- Born: 1963 (age 62–63) Suffern, New York, U.S.
- Party: Republican
- Education: University of Phoenix (BA)

Darren White is a former sheriff of Bernalillo County, New Mexico, elected in 2002 and re-elected in 2006. Prior to becoming Bernalillo County Sheriff, he was Secretary of the New Mexico Department of Public Safety in Governor Gary Johnson's cabinet. White resigned when Johnson began advocating the legalization of marijuana. White was appointed Chief Public Safety Officer for the City of Albuquerque on December 1, 2009, by the newly elected Albuquerque Mayor Richard J. Berry. He resigned amid allegations of questionable police procedure in an incident involving a family member, although was later cleared by an independent commission.

White ran for Mayor of Albuquerque in the 2025 Albuquerque mayoral election. He received 40,783 votes (31%) in the general election. He lost to incumbent Mayor Tim Keller in a runoff election on December 9, 2025.

== Biography ==
Darren White was born in Suffern, New York, in 1963 and moved to New Mexico in 1987. White holds a B.A. in management from the University of Phoenix.

White started his career as a street cop with the Houston Police Department and later joined the Albuquerque Police Department. Before entering law enforcement, White served in the U.S. Army as a clerk in the 82nd Airborne Division.

In 1995, Gov. Gary Johnson appointed White to head the New Mexico Department of Public Safety in 1995. He became the youngest state public safety director in the country at 31. During his tenure, White received a vote of no confidence from members of the New Mexico State Police Officers Association. The officers accused White of failing to properly supply them with vehicles and equipment, calling it an officer safety issue.

Sheriff White's honors include the Jefferson award in 1983 from the American Institute for Public Service. In 2006, following an eight-month search of more than 1,400 business, political, and civic leaders, the Aspen Institute recognized Sheriff White as one of the nation's top 24 young elected officials and selected him for a new fellowship program honoring public leaders. The Aspen Institute identified White as a "true rising star" in American politics.

After stepping down as Secretary of Public Safety, he worked in 1999 as a reporter for KRQE-TV, Channel 13.

White was the Republican candidate for US Congress in New Mexico's 1st congressional district for the 2008 elections, facing Albuquerque city councilman Martin Heinrich. The race was initially considered one of the hottest in the nation due to White's popularity in a Democratic-leaning county. However, in the end, White lost by an 11-point margin.

In March 2009, White began efforts to reinstate the New Mexico death penalty. The campaign is called Repeal the repeal.

In 2010 the mayor of Albuquerque, Richard J. Berry, appointed Darren White to oversee the Albuquerque police department as the Chief Public Safety Officer, the highest law enforcement position in the city of Albuquerque. He stepped down from this position following an incident in which he retrieved his wife from the scene of a crash following the permission of police on the scene, in the process preventing a breathalyzer test from being conducted. He was ultimately cleared of any wrongdoing by two independent investigations. White was the CEO of medical marijuana company until 2021.
