= Alexander M.M. Uballez =

American lawyer

Alex Uballez
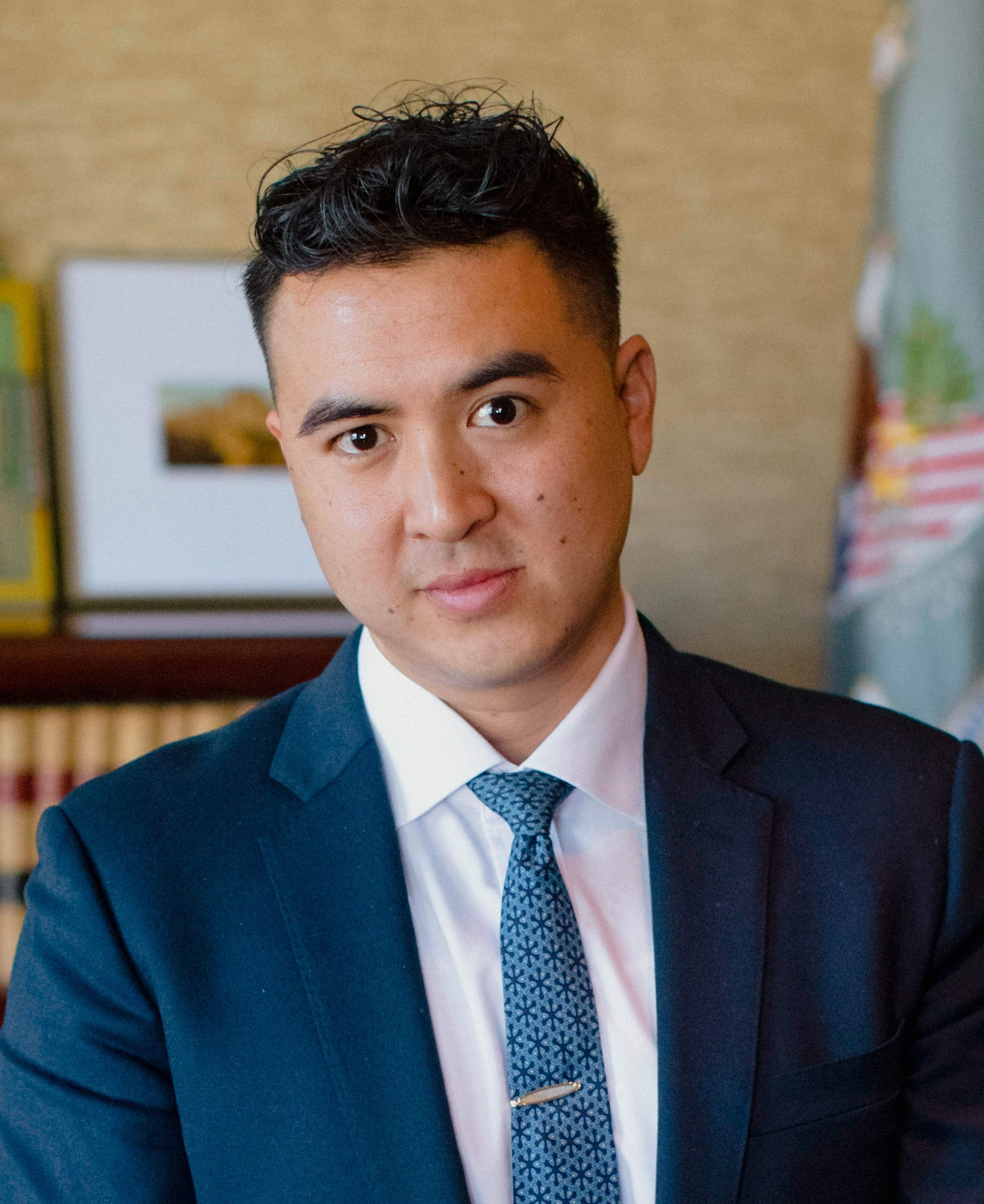

United States Attorney for the District of New Mexico
- In office May 24, 2022 – February 17, 2025
- President: Joe Biden; Donald Trump
- Preceded by: John Anderson
- Succeeded by: Holland Kastrin (acting)

Personal details
- Born: 1985 or 1986 (age 40–41)
- Party: Democratic
- Education: Pomona College (BA); Columbia University (JD)
- Website: Campaign website

Alexander Mamoru Max Uballez (born 1985 or 1986) is an American lawyer who served as the United States attorney for the District of New Mexico from 2022 to 2025.

== Education ==
Uballez earned a Bachelor of Arts from Pomona College in 2008 and a Juris Doctor from the Columbia University School of Law in 2011.

== Career ==
In 2011, Uballez served as a fellow in the New Jersey State Attorney General's Office. From 2011 to 2012, he served as an assistant district attorney for the First Judicial District Attorney's Office in Santa Fe. From 2012 to 2016, he was an assistant district attorney in the Second Judicial District Attorney's office in Albuquerque. From 2016 until his nomination for U.S. Attorney in 2022, he served as an assistant United States attorney in the United States Attorney's Office for the District of New Mexico.

He was a candidate for mayor of Albuquerque in the 2025 election, placing in third.

=== U.S. attorney for the district of New Mexico ===
On January 26, 2022, President Joe Biden announced his intent to nominate Uballez to be the United States attorney for the District of New Mexico. On January 31, 2022, his nomination was sent to the United States Senate. On May 12, 2022, his nomination was reported out of committee by voice vote. On May 17, 2022, his nomination was confirmed in the Senate by voice vote. He was sworn in on May 24, 2022.

He was removed from his position at the request of President Donald J. Trump on February 17, 2025.

Legal offices
Preceded by John C. Anderson	United States Attorney for the District of New Mexico; 2022–2025	Vacant
