= Janice Arnold-Jones =

American politician (born 1952)

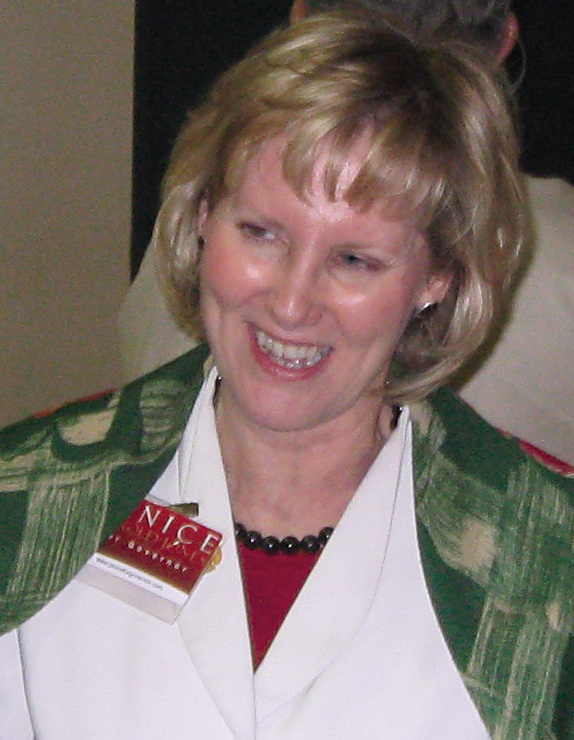

Member of the Albuquerque City Council from District 7
- In office April 16, 2013 – January 3, 2014
- Preceded by: Michael D. Cook
- Succeeded by: Diane Gibson

Member of the New Mexico House of Representatives from the 24th district
- In office January 21, 2003 – January 18, 2011
- Preceded by: George D. Buffett
- Succeeded by: Conrad James

Personal details
- Born: March 20, 1952 (age 74) Fort Bragg, North Carolina, U.S.
- Party: Republican
- Spouse: John Jones
- Education: University of New Mexico (BA)

Janice E. Arnold-Jones (born March 20, 1952) is an American politician who served as the New Mexico State Representative for the 24th district from 2003 to 2011. She is a member of the Republican Party.

== Early life, education, and business career ==
She was born in Fort Bragg, North Carolina, but raised in Albuquerque, New Mexico. Her father was a U.S. Air Force officer, who died on active duty. She graduated from Albuquerque High School and the University of New Mexico. She earned a B.A. in communications.

She married Ensign John L. Jones from the US Navy Reserve in July 1975 and departed Albuquerque as a Navy wife, returning in July 1994 when her husband took a final posting in the Logistics Directorate at Field Command, Defense Nuclear Agency, Kirtland AFB NM. During those years she owned two businesses and was a community activist everywhere they lived, working on issues ranging from rape intervention and counseling, education, community safety and served for almost 20 years as a soccer coach in Virginia, Rhode Island, Florida, and New Mexico.

She returned to the work force in Albuquerque as office manager for a small minority owned nuclear environmental business called Parallax, Inc and subsequently served as a mid- and senior grade executive at EnergySolutions, an international, cradle to grave, nuclear services company that assists the United States and other countries to achieve energy security while reducing carbon emissions and protecting the environment.

== New Mexico House of Representatives ==
=== Elections ===
After redistricting and having served over 20 years, incumbent Republican state representative George Buffett of New Mexico's 24th House District decided to retire. Representative Buffet suggest she run and she subsequently defeated Democrat Marilynn Cooper 59%-41%. In 2004, she was unopposed and won re-election to a second term. In 2006, she won re-election to a third term with 55% of the vote. In 2008, she again was unopposed and won re-election to a fourth term.

=== Tenure ===
Frustrated by backroom deals and late night finagling after the press corps went to bed, she brought a webcam to her committee meetings in the Legislature, and was eventually dubbed "Lady Sunlight" by the newspapers. The New Mexico Foundation for Open Government awarded her the William S. Dixon First Amendment Freedom Award. New Mexico's only conservative think tank, the Rio Grande Foundation, awarded her the Liberty Award.

=== Committee assignments ===
Regular Committees

- House Committee on Taxation and Revenue
- House Committee on Voters and Elections

Interim and Special Committees

- Blue Ribbon Tax Commission
- Election Reform Task Force
- Revenue Stabilization and Tax Policy
- Information Technology and Oversight
- New Mexico Finance Authority Oversight

== 2010 gubernatorial election ==
She decided to retire from the legislature and run for Governor of New Mexico after incumbent Democratic governor Bill Richardson was term limited. In the Republican primary, she ranked last in a five candidate field with 3% of the vote. Doña Ana County District Attorney Susana Martinez, for won the primary with 51% of the vote.

== 2012 congressional election ==
After incumbent Democrat, U.S. Congressman Martin Heinrich of New Mexico's 1st congressional district, decided to step down in order to run for U.S. Senate, Arnold-Jones decided to run. She initially faced Albuquerque City Councilman Dan Lewis and new resident (and Army veteran) Gary Smith in the Republican primary, but Lewis dropped his candidacy after under-performing in the Republican pre-primary convention and Smith was removed from the ballot when a New Mexico District Judge sustained a challenge, by 8 Republican voters, to the validity of Smith's petition signatures. As a result, Arnold-Jones was formally unopposed in the primary. She faced Democrat Michelle Lujan Grisham in the general election and was defeated 59% to 41%. Later, after the election, Gary Smith was charged with stalking Arnold-Jones and slashing her tires. He pleaded no contest and was sentenced to 30 months in prison.

== Albuquerque City Council ==
On April 15, 2013, she was appointed by Mayor Richard J. Berry to the Albuquerque City Council, filling a seat vacated by Council member Michael Cook, who resigned earlier in the month. She said she would seek election to a full term as a council member in the October 8, 2013 city election.

Earlier in the year, Albuquerque voters in a mail-in election approved an ordinance requiring 50% of the vote to avoid a runoff election, and in the general election on October 8, 2013, Arnold-Jones went on to win 49% of the vote, missing the 50% mark by 77 votes, triggering a runoff. In the runoff election on November 19, 2013, Arnold-Jones was defeated 51% to 49% by Democrat Diane Gibson.

== 2018 congressional election ==
In 2018, Arnold-Jones ran for the 1st district seat a second time after it was vacated by Lujan Grisham in order to run for Governor of New Mexico. Arnold-Jones was again unopposed in the primary, but lost to Deb Haaland in the general election, 59% to 36%.
