= John C. Anderson (lawyer) =

American lawyer (born 1975)

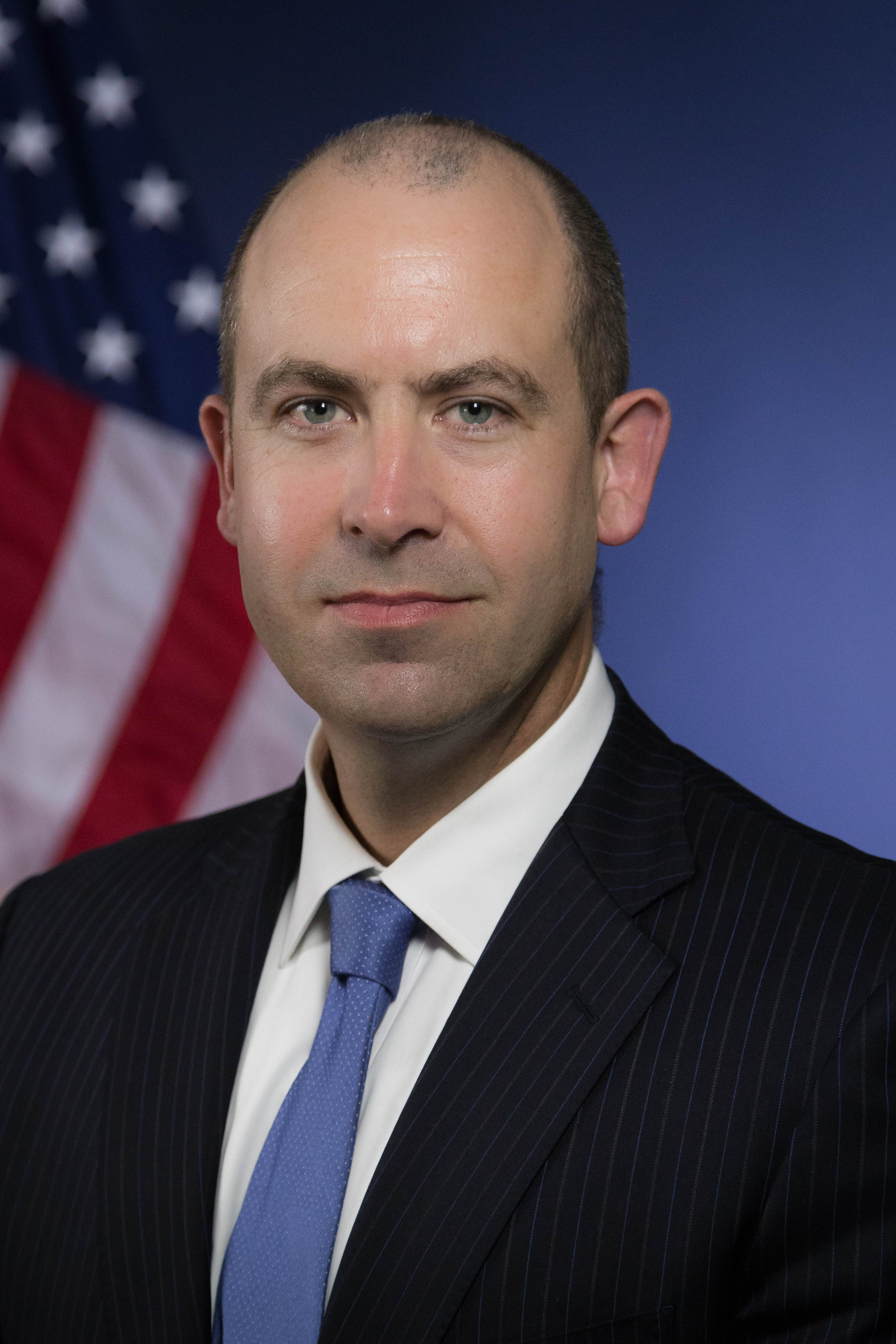

United States Attorney for the District of New Mexico
- In office February 23, 2018 – January 2, 2021
- President: Donald Trump
- Preceded by: Damon Martinez
- Succeeded by: Fred Joseph Federici III

Personal details
- Born: John Cumings Anderson; 1975 (age 50–51) Smithtown, New York, U.S.
- Education: Bowdoin College (AB); Fordham University (JD)

John Cumings Anderson (born 1975) is an American attorney who served as the United States Attorney for the United States District Court for the District of New Mexico from 2018 to 2021.

== Early life and education ==
Anderson was born and raised in Smithtown, New York. He earned an AB in Philosophy from Bowdoin College, and spent a year abroad at the Queen's University Belfast. He earned a Juris Doctor from the Fordham University School of Law, serving as a clerk for Paul Joseph Kelly Jr. of the United States Court of Appeals for the Tenth Circuit.

== Career ==
After earning his undergraduate degree, Anderson spent two years as a teacher at Morris Catholic High School. He also worked as a summer intern at the Kazakhstan International Bureau for Human Rights and Rule of Law in Bishkek.

After graduating from law school, Anderson was of counsel at Holland & Hart in Santa Fe, New Mexico. Anderson's legal practice focused on litigation and government investigations. From 2008 to 2013, he was an Assistant United States Attorney for the District of New Mexico. Before that, Anderson worked as a litigation associate at Simpson Thacher & Bartlett in New York City.

As an Assistant U.S. Attorney, Anderson prosecuted a number of individuals in high-profile political scandals in New Mexico. He prosecuted New Mexico Governor Susana Martinez's former campaign manager for intercepting Martinez's emails and he prosecuted a Democratic political consultant who pleaded guilty to possession of child pornography.

On February 15, 2018, his nomination to be the United States Attorney was confirmed by voice vote. He was sworn into office on February 23, 2018. He resigned on January 2, 2021.

Legal offices
Preceded by Damon Martinez	United States Attorney for the District of New Mexico; 2018–2021	Vacant
