= Damon Martinez =

American attorney

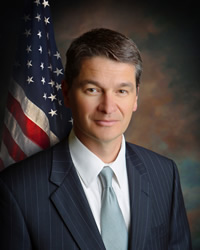

United States Attorney for the District of New Mexico
- In office May 27, 2014 – March 10, 2017
- President: Barack Obama; Donald Trump
- Preceded by: Kenneth J. Gonzales
- Succeeded by: John C. Anderson

Personal details
- Born: December 11, 1965 (age 60) Albuquerque, New Mexico, U.S.
- Party: Democratic
- Education: University of New Mexico, Albuquerque (BA, JD, MBA)

Damon P. Martinez (born December 11, 1965) is an American attorney who served as the United States Attorney for the District of New Mexico from 2014 to 2017.

== Early life and education ==
Martinez was born and raised in Albuquerque, New Mexico.

He earned a Bachelor of Arts in economics and political science from the University of New Mexico in 1989. In 1992, he earned his Juris Doctor from the University of New Mexico School of Law, followed by a Master of Business Administration from the Anderson School of Management in 1993.

== Career ==
From 1993 to 1996, Martinez worked as Legislative Assistant for Senator Jeff Bingaman. In 1999, worked as Legislative Director for Senator Tom Udall. Martinez began working for the Las Cruces Branch Office of the United States District Court for the District of New Mexico in 2000. He transferred to the Albuquerque office in 2005, where he worked as First Assistant US Attorney and Supervisor of the Organized Crime and Gangs section.

Martinez was appointed United States Attorney by President Barack Obama in 2013 and unanimously confirmed in the United States Senate in 2014. As United States Attorney, Martinez investigated sexual assault reporting at New Mexico universities. After finding inadequate policies and enforcement at the University of New Mexico, the United States Department of Justice reached an agreement to improve sexual assault tracking and increase student trainings on sexual misconduct.

Martinez took part in a $143 million settlement with the Chevron Corporation to clean up the Questa Mine near Taos, New Mexico in 2016. Under the agreement, Chevron Mining Inc. was required to open a wastewater treatment plan and cover more than 245 acres of mine tailings.

Martinez stepped down from his office at the request of the newly appointed Attorney General, Jeff Sessions, on March 11, 2017. Martinez was one of 40 US Attorneys asked to resign amid President Donald Trump’s transition to power.

On July 10, 2017, he announced his candidacy for New Mexico's 1st congressional district. He lost the primary election to Deb Haaland.

Since leaving government service, Martinez has worked as an attorney at Modrall Sperling, a law firm with offices in Albuquerque and Santa Fe, New Mexico.

Martinez ran for Bernalillo County District Attorney in 2024, but was defeated in the primary by incumbent Sam Bregman.

== See also ==
- 2017 dismissal of U.S. attorneys
