= Albuquerque City Council =

Municipal council

Coordinates: 35°5′15.5″N 106°39′5.7″W

Type
- Type: City council

Leadership
- Mayor: Tim Keller, (D) since 2017
- President: Klarissa J. Peña, (D) since January 2026
- Vice President: Dan Champine, (R) since January 2026

Structure
- Seats: 9 voting members
- Political groups: Minority: Republican (4); Majority: Democratic (5)

Meeting place
- Vincent E. Griego Chambers – City Hall

Website
- Albuquerque City Government – City Council

The Albuquerque City Council is the elected legislative authority of the city of Albuquerque, New Mexico. It consists of nine members, elected from respective districts of the city on a non-partisan basis. The form of city government is mayor–council government and home rule municipality. It meets in the Vincent A. Griego Chambers at the Albuquerque City Hall in Downtown Albuquerque.

== History ==
From 1916 to 1974, Albuquerque was governed by a city commission of at-large members. In the place of a president in the council, the mayor was known as the "Chairman of the Commission." In 1975, due to large growth in the city, voters replaced the commission system with a city council system.

== Composition ==
The council is composed of nine members in nine districts, each elected by their individual district residents to a four-year term. The chairman of the council is elected by members of the council on a yearly basis, in votes the chairman is likely chosen by the majority party in control of the city council. Since 1975, there have been no "at-large" members, elections are non-partisan, but party registration is often mentioned through local media outlets and the respective parties usually endorse their candidates.

=== Current members ===
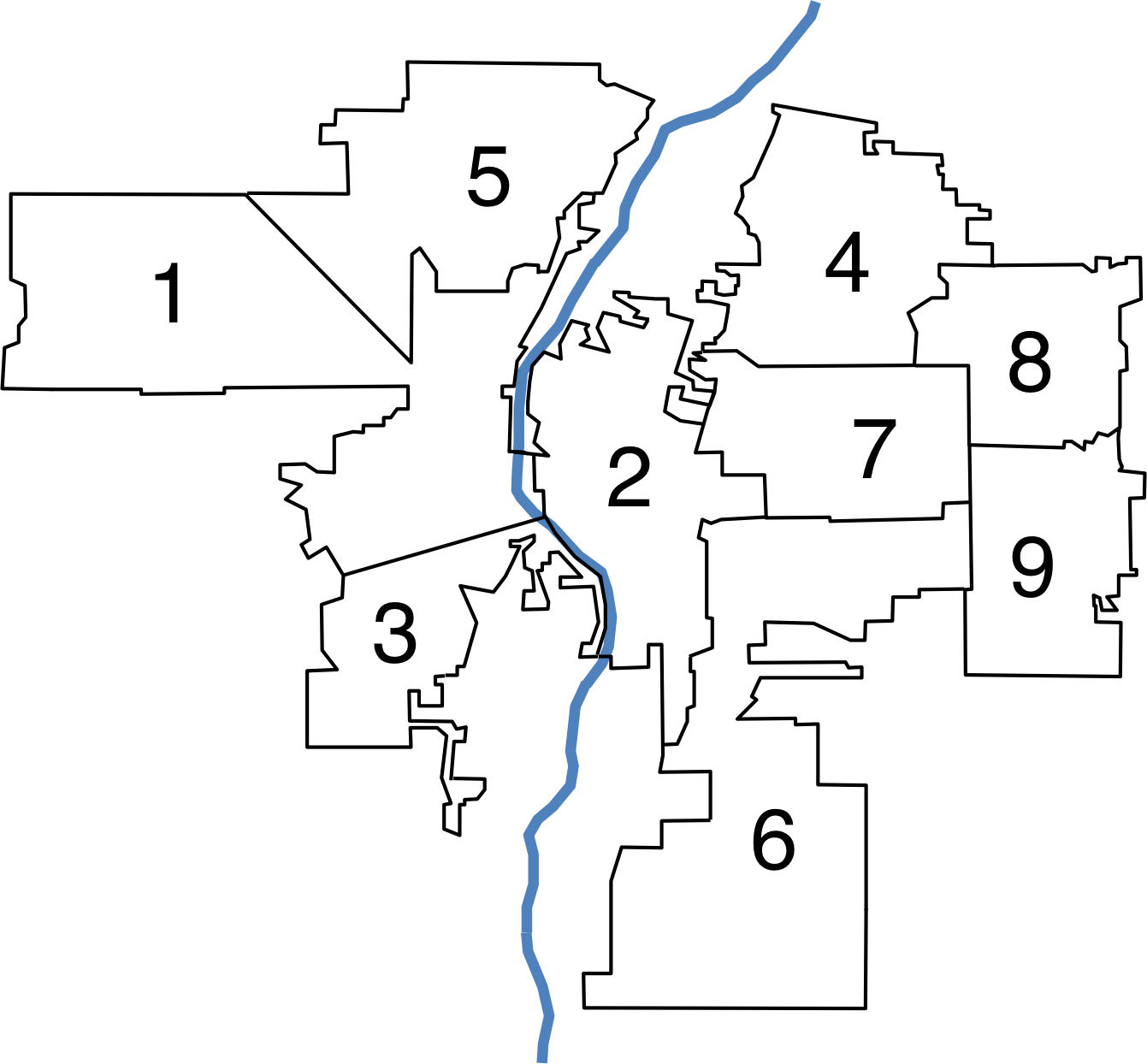
City council districts

Name	Position	Party reg.	Took office	Up for re-election
Stephanie Telles	District 1	Democratic	2026	2029
Joaquin Baca	District 2	Democratic	2024	2027
Klarissa Peña	District 3	Democratic	2014	2029
Brook Bassan	District 4	Republican	2020	2027
Dan Lewis	District 5	Republican	2022	2029
Nichole Rogers	District 6	Democratic	2024	2027
Tammy Fiebelkorn	District 7	Democratic	2022	2029
Dan Champine	District 8	Republican	2024	2027
Renee Grout	District 9	Republican	2022	2029

== Political party strength and past composition ==
Year	District								
Year	1	2	3	4	5	6	7	8	9
Year	D +8	D +11	D +8	R +10	R +2	D +15	D +2	R +13	R +4
1995	Alan Armijo (D)	Vincent Griego (D)	Adell Baca-Hundley (D)	Sam Bregman (D)	Tim Kline (D)	Hess Yntema (I)	Mike McEntee (R)	Timothy E. Cummins (R)	Michael Brasher (R)
1996	Alan Armijo (D)	Vincent Griego (D)	Adell Baca-Hundley (D)	Sam Bregman (D)	Tim Kline (D)	Hess Yntema (I)	Mike McEntee (R)	Timothy E. Cummins (R)	Michael Brasher (R)
1997	Alan Armijo (D)	Vincent Griego (D)	Adell Baca-Hundley (D)	Sam Bregman (D)	Tim Kline (D)	Hess Yntema (R)	Mike McEntee (R)	Timothy E. Cummins (R)	Michael Brasher (R)
1998	Alan Armijo (D)	Vincent Griego (D)	Adell Baca-Hundley (D)	Sam Bregman (D)	Tim Kline (D)	Hess Yntema (R)	Mike McEntee (R)	Timothy E. Cummins (R)	Michael Brasher (R)
1999	Alan Armijo (D)	Vincent Griego (D)	Eric Griego (D)	Brad Winter (R)	Tim Kline (D)	Hess Yntema (R)	Mike McEntee (R)	Greg Payne (R)	Michael Brasher (R)
2000	Alan Armijo (D)	Vincent Griego (D)	Eric Griego (D)	Brad Winter (R)	Tim Kline (D)	Hess Yntema (R)	Mike McEntee (R)	Greg Payne (R)	Michael Brasher (R)
2001	Miguel Gomez (D)	Vincent Griego (D)	Eric Griego (D)	Brad Winter (R)	Michael Cadigan (D)	Hess Yntema (R)	Sally Mayer (R)	Greg Payne (R)	Tina E. Cummins (R)
2002	Miguel Gomez (D)	Vincent Griego (D)	Eric Griego (D)	Brad Winter (R)	Michael Cadigan (D)	Hess Yntema (R)	Sally Mayer (R)	Greg Payne (R)	Tina E. Cummins (R)
2003	Miguel Gomez (D)	Debbie O'Malley (D)	Eric Griego (D)	Brad Winter (R)	Michael Cadigan (D)	Martin Heinrich (D)	Sally Mayer (R)	Craig Loy (R)	Tina E. Cummins (R)
2004	Miguel Gomez (D)	Debbie O'Malley (D)	Eric Griego (D)	Brad Winter (R)	Michael Cadigan (D)	Martin Heinrich (D)	Sally Mayer (R)	Craig Loy (R)	Tina E. Cummins (R)
2005	Ken Sanchez (D)	Debbie O'Malley (D)	Isaac Benton (D)	Brad Winter (R)	Michael Cadigan (D)	Martin Heinrich (D)	Sally Mayer (R)	Craig Loy (R)	Don Harris (R)
2006	Ken Sanchez (D)	Debbie O'Malley (D)	Isaac Benton (D)	Brad Winter (R)	Michael Cadigan (D)	Martin Heinrich (D)	Sally Mayer (R)	Craig Loy (R)	Don Harris (R)
2007	Ken Sanchez (D)	Debbie O'Malley (D)	Isaac Benton (D)	Brad Winter (R)	Michael Cadigan (D)	Rey Garduno (D)	Sally Mayer (R)	Trudy Jones (R)	Don Harris (R)
2008	Ken Sanchez (D)	Debbie O'Malley (D)	Isaac Benton (D)	Brad Winter (R)	Michael Cadigan (D)	Rey Garduno (D)	Sally Mayer (R)	Trudy Jones (R)	Don Harris (R)
2009	Ken Sanchez (D)	Debbie O'Malley (D)	Isaac Benton (D)	Brad Winter (R)	Dan Lewis (R)	Rey Garduno (D)	Michael Cook (R)	Trudy Jones (R)	Don Harris (R)
2010	Ken Sanchez (D)	Debbie O'Malley (D)	Isaac Benton (D)	Brad Winter (R)	Dan Lewis (R)	Rey Garduno (D)	Michael Cook (R)	Trudy Jones (R)	Don Harris (R)
2011	Ken Sanchez (D)	Roxanna Meyers (R)	Isaac Benton (D)	Brad Winter (R)	Dan Lewis (R)	Rey Garduno (D)	Janice Arnold-Jones (R)	Trudy Jones (R)	Don Harris (R)
2012	Ken Sanchez (D)	Roxanna Meyers (R)	Isaac Benton (D)	Brad Winter (R)	Dan Lewis (R)	Rey Garduno (D)	Janice Arnold-Jones (R)	Trudy Jones (R)	Don Harris (R)
2013	Ken Sanchez (D)	Isaac Benton (D)	Klarissa Pena (D)	Brad Winter (R)	Dan Lewis (R)	Rey Garduno (D)	Diane Gibson (D)	Trudy Jones (R)	Don Harris (R)
2014	Ken Sanchez (D)	Isaac Benton (D)	Klarissa Pena (D)	Brad Winter (R)	Dan Lewis (R)	Rey Garduno (D)	Diane Gibson (D)	Trudy Jones (R)	Don Harris (R)
2015	Ken Sanchez (D)	Isaac Benton (D)	Klarissa Pena (D)	Brad Winter (R)	Dan Lewis (R)	Rey Garduno (D)	Diane Gibson (D)	Trudy Jones (R)	Don Harris (R)
2016	Ken Sanchez (D)	Isaac Benton (D)	Klarissa Pena (D)	Brad Winter (R)	Dan Lewis (R)	Pat Davis (D)	Diane Gibson (D)	Trudy Jones (R)	Don Harris (R)
2017	Ken Sanchez (D)	Isaac Benton (D)	Klarissa Pena (D)	Brad Winter (R)	Dan Lewis (R)	Pat Davis (D)	Diane Gibson (D)	Trudy Jones (R)	Don Harris (R)
2018	Ken Sanchez (D)	Isaac Benton (D)	Klarissa Pena (D)	Brad Winter (R)	Cynthia Borrego (D)	Pat Davis (D)	Diane Gibson (D)	Trudy Jones (R)	Don Harris (R)
2019	Ken Sanchez (D)	Isaac Benton (D)	Klarissa Pena (D)	Brad Winter (R)	Cynthia Borrego (D)	Pat Davis (D)	Diane Gibson (D)	Trudy Jones (R)	Don Harris (R)
2020	Lan Sena (D)	Isaac Benton (D)	Klarissa Pena (D)	Brook Bassan (R)	Cynthia Borrego (D)	Pat Davis (D)	Diane Gibson (D)	Trudy Jones (R)	Don Harris (R)
2021	Lan Sena (D)	Isaac Benton (D)	Klarissa Pena (D)	Brook Bassan (R)	Cynthia Borrego (D)	Pat Davis (D)	Diane Gibson (D)	Trudy Jones (R)	Don Harris (R)
2022	Louie Sánchez (D)	Isaac Benton (D)	Klarissa Pena (D)	Brook Bassan (R)	Dan Lewis (R)	Pat Davis (D)	Tammy Fiebelkorn (D)	Trudy Jones (R)	Renee Grout (R)
2023	Louie Sánchez (D)	Isaac Benton (D)	Klarissa Pena (D)	Brook Bassan (R)	Dan Lewis (R)	Pat Davis (D)	Tammy Fiebelkorn (D)	Trudy Jones (R)	Renee Grout (R)
2024	Louie Sánchez (D)	Joaquin Baca (D)	Klarissa Pena (D)	Brook Bassan (R)	Dan Lewis (R)	Nichole Rogers (D)	Tammy Fiebelkorn (D)	Dan Champine (R)	Renee Grout (R)
2025	Louie Sánchez (D)	Joaquin Baca (D)	Klarissa Pena (D)	Brook Bassan (R)	Dan Lewis (R)	Nichole Rogers (D)	Tammy Fiebelkorn (D)	Dan Champine (R)	Renee Grout (R)
