= 2004 New Mexico Senate election =

- November 2, 2004

All 42 seats in the New Mexico Senate 22 seats needed for a majority
	Majority party	Minority party
Leader	Ben Altamirano	Stuart Ingle
Party	Democratic	Republican
Leader's seat	28th - Silver City	27th - Portales
Last election	24	18
Seats before	24	18
Seats won	24	18
Seat change	Steady	Steady
Popular vote	321,048	305,000
Percentage	51.19%	48.63%
Swing	▲2.94pp	▲0.46pp
- Results: Democratic hold Republican hold
President pro tempore before election
Ben Altamirano
Democratic
Elected President pro tempore
Ben Altamirano
Democratic

The 2004 New Mexico Senate election took place as part of the biennial United States elections. New Mexico voters elected state senators in all 42 of the state senate's districts. State senators serve four-year terms in the New Mexico Senate. The election coincided with elections for other offices, including for U.S. President, U.S House, and state house.

A primary election on June 1, 2004, determined which candidates appeared on the November 2nd general election ballot.

== Results summary ==
District	Incumbent	Party	Elected senator	Party
1	William Sharer	Rep	William Sharer	Rep
2	Raymond Kysar	Rep	Steven Neville	Rep
3	John Pinto	Dem	John Pinto	Dem
4	Lidio Rainaldi	Dem	Lidio Rainaldi	Dem
5	Richard Martinez	Dem	Richard Martinez	Dem
6	Carlos Cisneros	Dem	Carlos Cisneros	Dem
7	Clinton Harden	Rep	Clinton Harden	Rep
8	Pete Campos	Dem	Pete Campos	Dem
9	Steve Komadina	Rep	Steve Komadina	Rep
10	Ramsay Gorham	Rep	John Ryan	Rep
11	Linda Lopez	Dem	Linda Lopez	Dem
12	Richard Romero	Dem	Jerry Ortiz y Pino	Dem
13	Dede Feldman	Dem	Dede Feldman	Dem
14	Manny Aragon	Dem	James Taylor	Dem
15	Diane Snyder	Rep	Diane Snyder	Rep
16	Cisco McSorley	Dem	Cisco McSorley	Dem
17	Shannon Robinson	Dem	Shannon Robinson	Dem
18	Mark Boitano	Rep	Mark Boitano	Rep
19	Sue Wilson Beffort	Rep	Sue Wilson Beffort	Rep
20	William Payne	Rep	William Payne	Rep
21	Kent Cravens	Rep	Kent Cravens	Rep
22	Leonard Tsosie	Dem	Leonard Tsosie	Dem
23	Joseph Carraro	Rep	Joseph Carraro	Rep
24	Nancy Rodriguez	Dem	Nancy Rodriguez	Dem
25	Roman Maes III	Dem	John Grubesic	Dem
26	Bernadette Sanchez	Dem	Bernadette Sanchez	Dem
27	Stuart Ingle	Rep	Stuart Ingle	Rep
28	Ben Altamirano	Dem	Ben Altamirano	Dem
29	Michael Sanchez	Dem	Michael Sanchez	Dem
30	Joseph Fidel	Dem	Joseph Fidel	Dem
31	Cynthia Nava	Dem	Cynthia Nava	Dem
32	Timothy Jennings	Dem	Timothy Jennings	Dem
33	Rod Adair	Rep	Rod Adair	Rep
34	Don Kidd	Rep	Vernon Asbill	Rep
35	John Arthur Smith	Dem	John Arthur Smith	Dem
36	Mary Jane Garcia	Dem	Mary Jane Garcia	Dem
37	Leonard Lee Rawson	Rep	Leonard Lee Rawson	Rep
38	Mary Kay Papen	Dem	Mary Kay Papen	Dem
39	Phil Griego	Dem	Phil Griego	Dem
40	Dianna Duran	Rep	Dianna Duran	Rep
41	Carroll Leavell	Rep	Carroll Leavell	Rep
42	Gay Kernan	Rep	Gay Kernan	Rep

Party	Candi- dates	Votes		Seats		
Party	Candi- dates	No.	%	No.	+/–	%
Democratic	29	321,048	51.19%	24	Steady	57.14%
Republican	30	305,000	48.63%	18	Steady	42.86%
Independent	2	1,113	0.18%	0	Steady	0.00%
Total	61	627,161	100%	42	Steady	100%

Popular vote
Democratic	51.19%
Republican	48.63%
Independent	0.18%

Senate seats
Democratic	57.14%
Republican	42.86%

=== Retiring incumbents ===
- Allen Hurt (R-District 2)
- Ramsay Gorham (R-District 10)
- Richard Romero (D-District 12)
- Manny Aragon (D-District 14)
- Don Kidd (R-District 34)

=== Incumbents defeated in the primary election ===
- Roman Maes III (D-District 25), defeated by John Grubesic (D)

== Predictions ==
Source	Ranking	As of
Rothenberg	Likely D	October 1, 2004

== Detailed results ==
Source for primary election results: Source for general election results:

=== District 1 ===
Incumbent Republican William Sharer has represented the 1st district since 2001.

New Mexico Senate 1st district general election, 2004
Party	Candidate	Votes	%
Republican	William Sharer (incumbent)	11,340	63.60%
Democratic	Alfred Glass Jr.	6,489	36.40%
Total votes		17,829	100%
Republican hold			

=== District 2 ===
Incumbent Republican Raymond Kysar has represented the 2nd district since his appointment in 2003. Hysar didn't seek re-election and fellow Republican Steven Neville won the open seat.

New Mexico Senate 2nd district general election, 2004
Party	Candidate	Votes	%
Republican	Steven Neville	14,084	100%
Total votes		14,084	100%
Republican hold			

=== District 3 ===
Incumbent Democrat John Pinto has represented the 3rd district since 1977. Democratic primary

New Mexico Senate 3rd district Democratic primary election, 2004
Party	Candidate	Votes	%
Democratic	John Pinto (incumbent)	2,357	66.87%
Democratic	Dineh Benally	1,168	33.13%
Total votes		3,525	100%

General election

New Mexico Senate 3rd district general election, 2004
Party	Candidate	Votes	%
Democratic	John Pinto (incumbent)	10,828	100%
Total votes		10,828	100%
Democratic hold			

=== District 4 ===
Incumbent Democrat Lidio Rainaldi has represented the 4th district since 2001. Democratic primary

New Mexico Senate 4th district Democratic primary election, 2004
Party	Candidate	Votes	%
Democratic	Lidio Rainaldi (incumbent)	2,065	52.38%
Democratic	Gloria Skeet	1,134	28.77%
Democratic	Johnny Thompson	743	18.85%
Total votes		3,942	100%

General election

New Mexico Senate 4th district general election, 2004
Party	Candidate	Votes	%
Democratic	Lidio Rainaldi (incumbent)	10,211	100%
Total votes		10,211	100%
Democratic hold			

=== District 5 ===
Incumbent Democrat Richard Martinez has represented the 5th district since 2001.

New Mexico Senate 5th district general election, 2004
Party	Candidate	Votes	%
Democratic	Richard Martinez (incumbent)	13,743	100%
Total votes		13,743	100%
Democratic hold			

=== District 6 ===
Incumbent Democrat Carlos Cisneros has represented the 6th district since 1985.

New Mexico Senate 6th district general election, 2004
Party	Candidate	Votes	%
Democratic	Carlos Cisneros (incumbent)	16,256	100%
Total votes		16,256	100%
Democratic hold			

=== District 7 ===
Incumbent Republican Clinton Harden has represented the 7th district since his appointment in 2003. Harden was elected to a full term. Democratic primary

New Mexico Senate 7th district Democratic primary election, 2004
Party	Candidate	Votes	%
Democratic	Robert Frost	3,029	69.82%
Democratic	Fred Sparks	1,309	30.18%
Total votes		4,338	100%

General election

New Mexico Senate 7th district general election, 2004
Party	Candidate	Votes	%
Republican	Clinton Harden (incumbent)	9,010	50.10%
Democratic	Robert Frost	8,974	49.90%
Total votes		17,984	100%
Republican hold			

=== District 8 ===
Incumbent Democrat Pete Campos has represented the 8th district since 1991.

New Mexico Senate 8th district general election, 2004
Party	Candidate	Votes	%
Democratic	Pete Campos (incumbent)	10,654	62.89%
Republican	Linda Jaramillo	6,288	37.11%
Total votes		16,942	100%
Democratic hold			

=== District 9 ===
Incumbent Republican Steve Komadina has represented the 9th district since 2001.

New Mexico Senate 9th district general election, 2004
Party	Candidate	Votes	%
Republican	Steve Komadina (incumbent)	14,688	100%
Total votes		14,688	100%
Republican hold			

=== District 10 ===
Incumbent Republican Ramsay Gorham has represented the 10th district since 1997. Gorham didn't seek re-election and fellow Republican John Ryan won the open seat. Democratic primary

New Mexico Senate 10th district Democratic primary election, 2004
Party	Candidate	Votes	%
Democratic	John Hooker	1,339	52.16%
Democratic	Victor Paul Raigoza	1,228	47.84%
Total votes		2,567	100%

General election

New Mexico Senate 10th district general election, 2004
Party	Candidate	Votes	%
Republican	John Ryan	12,651	54.34%
Democratic	John Hooker	10,632	45.66%
Total votes		23,283	100%
Republican hold			

=== District 11 ===
Incumbent Democrat Linda Lopez has represented the 11th district since 1997.

New Mexico Senate 11th district general election, 2004
Party	Candidate	Votes	%
Democratic	Linda Lopez (incumbent)	8,404	64.40%
Republican	Tom Benavides	4,645	35.60%
Total votes		13,049	100%
Democratic hold			

=== District 12 ===
Incumbent Democrat Richard Romero has represented the 12th district since 1993. Romero retired to run for Congress and fellow Democrat Jerry Ortiz y Pino won the open seat. Democratic primary

New Mexico Senate 12th district Democratic primary election, 2004
Party	Candidate	Votes	%
Democratic	Jerry Ortiz y Pino	1,920	65.02%
Democratic	Adele Baca Hundley	794	26.89%
Democratic	Reggie Garcia	239	8.09%
Total votes		2,953	100%

General election

New Mexico Senate 12th district general election, 2004
Party	Candidate	Votes	%
Democratic	Jerry Ortiz y Pino	10,760	74.10%
Republican	Gwen Poe	3,760	25.90%
Total votes		14,520	100%
Democratic hold			

=== District 13 ===
Incumbent Democrat Dede Feldman has represented the 13th district since 1997.

New Mexico Senate 13th district general election, 2004
Party	Candidate	Votes	%
Democratic	Dede Feldman (incumbent)	15,876	100%
Total votes		15,876	100%
Democratic hold			

=== District 14 ===
Incumbent Democrat Manny Aragon has represented the 14th district since 1975. Aragon didn't seek re-election and fellow Democrat James Taylor won the open seat.

New Mexico Senate 14th district general election, 2004
Party	Candidate	Votes	%
Democratic	James Taylor	6,823	54.09%
Republican	Fernando De Baca	4,677	37.08%
Independent	Kathleen Ann Sabo	890	7.06%
Independent	Alfred Bennett III	223	1.77%
Total votes		12,613	100%
Democratic hold			

=== District 15 ===
Incumbent Republican Diane Snyder has represented the 15th district since 2001

New Mexico Senate 15th district general election, 2004
Party	Candidate	Votes	%
Republican	Diane Snyder (incumbent)	11,228	52.63%
Democratic	Chris Berkheimer	10,105	47.37%
Total votes		21,333	100%
Republican hold			

=== District 16 ===
Incumbent Democrat Cisco McSorley has represented the 16th district since 1997.

New Mexico Senate 16th district general election, 2004
Party	Candidate	Votes	%
Democratic	Cisco McSorley (incumbent)	15,628	100%
Total votes		15,628	100%
Democratic hold			

=== District 17 ===
Incumbent Democrat Shannon Robinson has represented the 17th district since 1989.

New Mexico Senate 17th district general election, 2004
Party	Candidate	Votes	%
Democratic	Shannon Robinson (incumbent)	6,389	55.83%
Republican	Mary Gilbert	5,054	44.17%
Total votes		11,443	100%
Democratic hold			

=== District 18 ===
Incumbent Republican Mark Boitano has represented the 18th district since 1997.

New Mexico Senate 18th district general election, 2004
Party	Candidate	Votes	%
Republican	Mark Boitano (incumbent)	15,271	100%
Total votes		15,271	100%
Republican hold			

=== District 19 ===
Incumbent Republican Sue Wilson Beffort has represented the 19th district since 1997.

New Mexico Senate 19th district general election, 2004
Party	Candidate	Votes	%
Republican	Sue Wilson Beffort (incumbent)	15,614	100%
Total votes		15,614	100%
Republican hold			

=== District 20 ===
Incumbent Republican William Payne has represented the 20th district since 1997.

New Mexico Senate 20th district general election, 2004
Party	Candidate	Votes	%
Republican	William Payne (incumbent)	15,199	100%
Total votes		15,199	100%
Republican hold			

=== District 21 ===
Incumbent Republican Kent Cravens has represented the 21st district since 2001.

New Mexico Senate 21st district general election, 2004
Party	Candidate	Votes	%
Republican	Kent Cravens (incumbent)	18,678	100%
Total votes		18,678	100%
Republican hold			

=== District 22 ===
Incumbent Democrat Leonard Tsosie has represented the 22nd district since 1993. Democratic primary

New Mexico Senate 22nd district Democratic primary election, 2004
Party	Candidate	Votes	%
Democratic	Leonard Tsosie (incumbent)	2,366	59.81%
Democratic	Everett Chavez	1,590	40.19%
Total votes		3,956	100%

Republican primary

New Mexico Senate 22nd district Republican primary election, 2004
Party	Candidate	Votes	%
Republican	Ernest Geros	342	54.72%
Republican	Delores Garcia	283	45.28%
Total votes		625	100%

General election

New Mexico Senate 22nd district general election, 2004
Party	Candidate	Votes	%
Democratic	Leonard Tsosie (incumbent)	10,175	66.05%
Republican	Ernest Geros	5,229	33.95%
Total votes		15,404	100%
Democratic hold			

=== District 23 ===
Incumbent Republican Joseph Carraro has represented the 23rd district since 1993.

New Mexico Senate 23rd district general election, 2004
Party	Candidate	Votes	%
Republican	Joseph Carraro (incumbent)	19,614	100%
Total votes		19,614	100%
Republican hold			

=== District 24 ===
Incumbent Democrat Nancy Rodriguez has represented the 24th district since 1997.

New Mexico Senate 24th district general election, 2004
Party	Candidate	Votes	%
Democratic	Nancy Rodriguez (incumbent)	14,915	100%
Total votes		14,915	100%
Democratic hold			

=== District 25 ===
Incumbent Democrat Roman Maes III has represented the 25th district since 1985. Maes lost re-nomination to fellow Democrat John Grubesic, who went on to win the general election. Democratic primary

New Mexico Senate 25th district Democratic primary election, 2004
Party	Candidate	Votes	%
Democratic	John Grubesic	2,932	36.49%
Democratic	Roman Maes III (incumbent)	2,575	32.04%
Democratic	Letitia Montoya	1,512	18.82%
Democratic	Geraldine Salazar	1,017	12.66%
Total votes		8,036	100%

General election

New Mexico Senate 25th district general election, 2004
Party	Candidate	Votes	%
Democratic	John Grubesic	22,598	79.05%
Republican	Robert Mallin	5,988	20.95%
Total votes		28,586	100%
Democratic hold			

=== District 26 ===
Incumbent Democrat Bernadette Sanchez has represented the 26th district since 2001. Democratic primary

New Mexico Senate 26th district Democratic primary election, 2004
Party	Candidate	Votes	%
Democratic	Bernadette Sanchez (incumbent)	1,663	65.68%
Democratic	Dolores Griego	869	34.32%
Total votes		2,532	100%

General election

New Mexico Senate 26th district general election, 2004
Party	Candidate	Votes	%
Democratic	Bernadette Sanchez (incumbent)	12,702	100%
Total votes		12,702	100%
Democratic hold			

=== District 27 ===
Incumbent Republican and Minority Leader Stuart Ingle has represented the 27th district since 1985.

New Mexico Senate 27th district general election, 2004
Party	Candidate	Votes	%
Republican	Stuart Ingle (incumbent)	10,306	100%
Total votes		10,306	100%
Republican hold			

=== District 28 ===
Incumbent Democrat and President pro tempore Ben Altamirano has represented the 28th district since 1971.

New Mexico Senate 28th district general election, 2004
Party	Candidate	Votes	%
Democratic	Ben Altamirano (incumbent)	15,282	100%
Total votes		15,282	100%
Democratic hold			

=== District 29 ===
Incumbent Democrat Michael Sanchez has represented the 29th district since 1993.

New Mexico Senate 29th district general election, 2004
Party	Candidate	Votes	%
Democratic	Michael Sanchez (incumbent)	10,818	62.71%
Republican	Abran Gabaldon	6,434	37.29%
Total votes		17,252	100%
Democratic hold			

=== District 30 ===
Incumbent Democrat Joseph Fidel has represented the 30th district since 1973.

New Mexico Senate 30th district general election, 2004
Party	Candidate	Votes	%
Democratic	Joseph Fidel (incumbent)	8,471	61.71%
Republican	Gary Whittington	5,257	38.29%
Total votes		13,728	100%
Democratic hold			

=== District 31 ===
Incumbent Democrat Cynthia Nava has represented the 31st district since 1993.

New Mexico Senate 31st district general election, 2004
Party	Candidate	Votes	%
Democratic	Cynthia Nava (incumbent)	5,838	100%
Total votes		5,838	100%
Democratic hold			

=== District 32 ===
Incumbent Democrat Timothy Jennings has represented the 32nd district since 1979.

New Mexico Senate 32nd district general election, 2004
Party	Candidate	Votes	%
Democratic	Timothy Jennings (incumbent)	7,952	100%
Total votes		7,952	100%
Democratic hold			

=== District 33 ===
Incumbent Republican Rod Adair has represented the 33rd district since 1997.

New Mexico Senate New Mexico Senate 33rd district general election, 2004
Party	Candidate	Votes	%
Republican	Rod Adair (incumbent)	14,526	100%
Total votes		14,526	100%
Republican hold			

=== District 34 ===
Incumbent Republican Don Kidd has represented the 34th district since 1993. Kidd didn't seek re-election and fellow Republican Vernon Asbill won the open seat. Democratic primary

New Mexico Senate 34th district Democratic primary election, 2004
Party	Candidate	Votes	%
Democratic	Jeffrey Diamond	2,477	62.96%
Democratic	Steve West	1,457	37.04%
Total votes		3,934	100%

Republican primary

New Mexico Senate 34th district Republican primary election, 2004
Party	Candidate	Votes	%
Republican	Vernon Asbill	1,399	53.34%
Republican	Lucky Briggs	1,224	46.66%
Total votes		2,623	100%

General election

New Mexico Senate 34th district general election, 2004
Party	Candidate	Votes	%
Republican	Vernon Asbill	11,065	58.83%
Democratic	Jeffrey Diamond	7,742	41.17%
Total votes		18,807	100%
Republican hold			

=== District 35 ===
Incumbent Democrat John Arthur Smith has represented the 35th district since 1989.

New Mexico Senate 35th district general election, 2004
Party	Candidate	Votes	%
Democratic	John Arthur Smith (incumbent)	9,715	100%
Total votes		9,715	100%
Democratic hold			

=== District 36 ===
Incumbent Democrat Mary Jane Garcia has represented the 36th district since 1989.

New Mexico Senate 36th district general election, 2004
Party	Candidate	Votes	%
Democratic	Mary Jane Garcia (incumbent)	9,570	58.83%
Republican	Lee Cotter	6,698	41.17%
Total votes		16,268	100%
Democratic hold			

=== District 37 ===
Incumbent Republican Leonard Lee Rawson has represented the 37th district since 1993. Republican primary

New Mexico Senate 37th district Republican primary election, 2004
Party	Candidate	Votes	%
Republican	Leonard Lee Rawson (incumbent)	1,667	82.69%
Republican	Janie McMullan-Blue	349	17.31%
Total votes		2,016	100%

General election

New Mexico Senate 37th district general election, 2004
Party	Candidate	Votes	%
Republican	Leonard Lee Rawson (incumbent)	14,748	100%
Total votes		14,748	100%
Republican hold			

=== District 38 ===
Incumbent Democrat Mary Kay Papen has represented the 38th district since 2001.

New Mexico Senate 38th district general election, 2004
Party	Candidate	Votes	%
Democratic	Mary Kay Papen (incumbent)	10,404	67.90%
Republican	Darl Miller	4,919	32.10%
Total votes		15,323	100%
Democratic hold			

=== District 39 ===
Incumbent Democrat Phil Griego has represented the 39th district since 1997.

New Mexico Senate 39th district general election, 2004
Party	Candidate	Votes	%
Democratic	Phil Griego (incumbent)	13,094	71.54%
Republican	Al López	5,208	28.46%
Total votes		18,302	100%
Democratic hold			

=== District 40 ===
Incumbent Republican Dianna Duran has represented the 40th district since 1993.

New Mexico Senate 40th district general election, 2004
Party	Candidate	Votes	%
Republican	Dianna Duran (incumbent)	10,898	100%
Total votes		10,898	100%
Republican hold			

=== District 41 ===
Incumbent Republican Carroll Leavell has represented the 41st district since 1997.

New Mexico Senate 41st district general election, 2004
Party	Candidate	Votes	%
Republican	Carroll Leavell (incumbent)	9,042	100%
Total votes		9,042	100%
Republican hold			

=== District 42 ===
Incumbent Republican Gay Kernan has represented the 42nd district since her appointment in 2002. Kernan was elected to a full term. Republican primary

New Mexico Senate 42nd district Republican primary election, 2004
Party	Candidate	Votes	%
Republican	Gay Kernan (incumbent)	1,639	60.12%
Republican	Will Palmer	1,087	39.88%
Total votes		2,726	100%

General election

New Mexico Senate 42nd district general election, 2004
Party	Candidate	Votes	%
Republican	Gay Kernan (incumbent)	12,881	100%
Total votes		12,881	100%
Republican hold			

== See also ==
- 2004 United States elections
- 2004 United States presidential election in New Mexico
- 2004 United States House of Representatives elections in New Mexico
- 2004 New Mexico House of Representatives election
