= 2000 New Mexico Senate election =

- November 7, 2000

All 42 seats in the New Mexico Senate 22 seats needed for a majority
	Majority party	Minority party
Leader	Manny Aragon	Skip Vernon (Retired)
Party	Democratic	Republican
Leader's seat	14th - Albuquerque	15th - Albuquerque
Last election	25	17
Seats before	25	17
Seats won	24	18
Seat change	▼1	▲1
Popular vote	245,440	245,026
Percentage	48.25%	48.17%
- Results: Republican gain Democratic hold Republican hold
President pro tempore before election
Manny Aragon
Democratic
Elected President pro tempore
Richard Romero
Democratic

The 2000 New Mexico Senate election took place as part of the biennial United States elections. New Mexico voters elected state senators in all 42 of the state senate's districts. State senators serve four-year terms in the New Mexico Senate. The election coincided with elections for other offices, including U.S. president, U.S. Senate, U.S. House, and state house.

A primary election on June 6, 2000, determined which candidates appeared on the November 7 general election ballot.

== Results summary ==
District	Incumbent	Party	Elected senator	Party
1	Raymond Kysar Jr.	Rep	William Sharer	Rep
2	R. L. Stockard	Rep	Allen Hurt	Rep
3	John Pinto	Dem	John Pinto	Dem
4	Gloria Howes	Dem	Lidio Rainaldi	Dem
5	Arthur Rodarte	Dem	Richard Martinez	Dem
6	Carlos Cisneros	Dem	Carlos Cisneros	Dem
7	Patrick Lyons	Rep	Patrick Lyons	Rep
8	Pete Campos	Dem	Pete Campos	Dem
9	Pauline Eisenstadt	Dem	Steve Komadina	Rep
10	Ramsay Gorham	Rep	Ramsay Gorham	Rep
11	Linda Lopez	Dem	Linda Lopez	Dem
12	Richard Romero	Dem	Richard Romero	Dem
13	Dede Feldman	Dem	Dede Feldman	Dem
14	Manny Aragon	Dem	Manny Aragon	Dem
15	Skip Vernon	Rep	Diane Snyder	Rep
16	Cisco McSorley	Dem	Cisco McSorley	Dem
17	Shannon Robinson	Dem	Shannon Robinson	Dem
18	Mark Boitano	Rep	Mark Boitano	Rep
19	Sue Wilson	Rep	Sue Wilson	Rep
20	William Payne	Rep	William Payne	Rep
21	William Davis	Rep	Kent Cravens	Rep
22	Leonard Tsosie	Dem	Leonard Tsosie	Dem
23	Joseph Carraro	Rep	Joseph Carraro	Rep
24	Nancy Rodriguez	Dem	Nancy Rodriguez	Dem
25	Roman Maes III	Dem	Roman Maes III	Dem
26	Phillip Maloof	Dem	Bernadette Sanchez	Dem
27	Stuart Ingle	Rep	Stuart Ingle	Rep
28	Ben Altamirano	Dem	Ben Altamirano	Dem
29	Michael Sanchez	Dem	Michael Sanchez	Dem
30	Joseph Fidel	Dem	Joseph Fidel	Dem
31	Cynthia Nava	Dem	Cynthia Nava	Dem
32	Timothy Jennings	Dem	Timothy Jennings	Dem
33	Rod Adair	Rep	Rod Adair	Rep
34	Don Kidd	Rep	Don Kidd	Rep
35	John Arthur Smith	Dem	John Arthur Smith	Dem
36	Mary Jane Garcia	Dem	Mary Jane Garcia	Dem
37	Leonard Lee Rawson	Rep	Leonard Lee Rawson	Rep
38	Fernando Macias	Dem	Mary Kay Papen	Dem
39	Phil Griego	Dem	Phil Griego	Dem
40	Dianna Duran	Rep	Dianna Duran	Rep
41	Carroll Leavell	Rep	Carroll Leavell	Rep
42	Billy McKibben	Rep	Shirley Bailey	Rep

Party	Candi- dates	Votes		Seats		
Party	Candi- dates	No.	%	No.	+/–	%
Democratic	31	245,440	48.25%	24	▼1	57.14%
Republican	31	245,026	48.17%	18	▲1	42.86%
Green	1	7,638	1.50%	0	Steady	0.00%
Libertarian	2	5,534	1.09%	0	Steady	0.00%
Independent	2	4,286	0.84%	0	Steady	0.00%
Write-in	2	729	0.14%	0	Steady	0.00%
Total	69	508,653	100%	42	Steady	100%

Popular vote
Democratic	48.25%
Republican	48.17%
Green	1.50%
Libertarian	1.09%
Independent	0.84%
Write-in	0.14%

Senate seats
Democratic	57.14%
Republican	42.86%

=== Incumbents defeated in the primary election ===
- R.L. Stockard (R-District 2), defeated by Allen Hurt (R)
- Arthur Rodarte (D-District 5), defeated by Richard Martinez (D)

=== Open seats that changed parties ===
- Pauline Eisenstadt (D-District 9) did not seek re-election, seat won by Steve Komadina (R)

== Detailed results ==
Source for primary election results: Source for general election results:

=== District 1 ===
Incumbent Republican Raymond Kysar Jr. had represented the 1st district since 1989. Kysar did not seek re-election, and fellow Republican William Sharer won the open seat.

Republican primary

New Mexico Senate 1st district Republican primary election, 2000
Party	Candidate	Votes	%
Republican	William Sharer	1,655	54.57%
Republican	Sherry Galloway	1,378	45.43%
Total votes		3,033	100%

General election

New Mexico Senate 1st district general election, 2000
Party	Candidate	Votes	%
Republican	William Sharer	10,232	81.80%
Libertarian	Ronald Barrett	2,276	18.20%
Total votes		12,508	100%
Republican hold			

=== District 2 ===
Incumbent Republican R. L. Stockard had represented the 2nd district since 1997. Stockard lost re-nomination to fellow Republican Allen Hurt, who went on to win the general election.

Republican primary

New Mexico Senate 1st district Republican primary election, 2000
Party	Candidate	Votes	%
Republican	Allen Hurt	1,745	56.18%
Republican	R. L. Stockard (incumbent)	1,361	43.82%
Total votes		3,106	100%

General election

New Mexico Senate 2nd district general election, 2000
Party	Candidate	Votes	%
Republican	Allen Hurt	9,234	65.34%
Democratic	Darla Whitney-Welles	4,899	34.66%
Total votes		14,133	100%
Republican hold			

=== District 3 ===
Incumbent Democrat John Pinto had represented the 3rd district since 1977.

Democratic primary

New Mexico Senate 3rd district Democratic primary election, 2000
Party	Candidate	Votes	%
Democratic	John Pinto (incumbent)	3,125	75.36%
Democratic	Virginia Bitsilly	1,022	24.64%
Total votes		4,147	100%

General election

New Mexico Senate 3rd district general election, 2000
Party	Candidate	Votes	%
Democratic	John Pinto (incumbent)	8,080	77.64%
Republican	Jimmie Garnenez Sr.	2,327	22.36%
Total votes		10,407	100%
Democratic hold			

=== District 4 ===
Incumbent Democrat Gloria Howes had represented the 4th district since 1989. Howes did not seek re-election, and fellow Democrat Lidio Rainaldi won the open seat.

Democratic primary

New Mexico Senate 4th district Democratic primary election, 2000
Party	Candidate	Votes	%
Democratic	Lidio Rainaldi	1,802	48.34%
Democratic	R. David Pederson	1,095	29.37%
Democratic	Clara Chicharello	831	22.29%
Total votes		3,728	100%

General election

New Mexico Senate 4th district general election, 2000
Party	Candidate	Votes	%
Democratic	Lidio Rainaldi	6,862	100%
Total votes		6,862	100%
Democratic hold			

=== District 5 ===
Incumbent Democrat Arthur Rodarte had represented the 5th district since 1997. Rodarte lost re-nomination to fellow Democrat Richard Martinez, who ran unopposed in the general election.

Democratic primary

New Mexico Senate 5th district Democratic primary election, 2000
Party	Candidate	Votes	%
Democratic	Richard Martinez	4,030	50.77%
Democratic	Arthur Rodarte (incumbent)	2,976	37.50%
Democratic	David Victor Cordova	931	11.73%
Total votes		7,937	100%

General election

New Mexico Senate 5th district general election, 2000
Party	Candidate	Votes	%
Democratic	Richard Martinez	10,751	100%
Total votes		10,751	100%
Democratic hold			

=== District 6 ===
Incumbent Democrat Carlos Cisneros had represented the 6th district since 1985.

Democratic primary

New Mexico Senate 6th district Democratic primary election, 2000
Party	Candidate	Votes	%
Democratic	Carlos Cisneros (incumbent)	3,990	54.26%
Democratic	F. R. Bob Romero	3,364	45.74%
Total votes		7,354	100%

General election

New Mexico Senate 6th district general election, 2000
Party	Candidate	Votes	%
Democratic	Carlos Cisneros (incumbent)	11,745	100%
Total votes		11,745	100%
Democratic hold			

=== District 7 ===
Incumbent Republican Patrick Lyons had represented the 7th district since 1993.

New Mexico Senate 7th district general election, 2000
Party	Candidate	Votes	%
Republican	Patrick Lyons (incumbent)	10,489	68.78%
Democratic	Al Lopez	4,761	31.22%
Total votes		15,250	100%
Republican hold			

=== District 8 ===
Incumbent Democrat Pete Campos had represented the 8th district since 1991.

New Mexico Senate 8th district general election, 2000
Party	Candidate	Votes	%
Democratic	Pete Campos (incumbent)	10,796	100%
Total votes		10,796	100%
Democratic hold			

=== District 9 ===
Incumbent Democrat Pauline Eisenstadt had represented the 9th district since 1997. Eisenstadt did not seek re-election, and Republican Steve Komadina won the open seat.

New Mexico Senate 9th district general election, 2000
Party	Candidate	Votes	%
Republican	Steve Komadina	11,703	55.11%
Democratic	Brad Hays	9,532	44.89%
Total votes		21,235	100%
Republican gain from Democratic			

=== District 10 ===
Incumbent Republican Ramsay Gorham had represented the 10th district since 1997. Gorham's predecessor, Democrat Janice Paster, unsuccessfully sought a rematch with Gorham.

Democratic primary

New Mexico Senate 10th district Democratic primary election, 2000
Party	Candidate	Votes	%
Democratic	Janice Paster	2,382	80.26%
Democratic	Gary van Valin	586	19.74%
Total votes		2,968	100%

General election

New Mexico Senate 10th district general election, 2000
Party	Candidate	Votes	%
Republican	Ramsay Gorham (incumbent)	9,209	53.80%
Democratic	Janice Paster	7,907	46.20%
Total votes		17,116	100%
Republican hold			

=== District 11 ===
Incumbent Democrat Linda Lopez had represented the 11th district since 1997.

Democratic primary

New Mexico Senate 11th district Democratic primary election, 2000
Party	Candidate	Votes	%
Democratic	Linda Lopez (incumbent)	1,842	68.25%
Democratic	David Benavidez	857	31.75%
Total votes		2,699	100%

General election

New Mexico Senate 11th district general election, 2000
Party	Candidate	Votes	%
Democratic	Linda Lopez (incumbent)	6,976	68.14%
Republican	Richard Ray Sanchez	3,262	31.86%
Total votes		10,238	100%
Democratic hold			

=== District 12 ===
Incumbent Democrat Richard Romero had represented the 12th district since 1993.

New Mexico Senate 12th district general election, 2000
Party	Candidate	Votes	%
Democratic	Richard Romero (incumbent)	7,826	74.05%
Republican	Carlton Pennington	2,742	25.95%
Total votes		10,568	100%
Democratic hold			

=== District 13 ===
Incumbent Democrat Dede Feldman had represented the 13th district since 1997.

New Mexico Senate 13th district general election, 2000
Party	Candidate	Votes	%
Democratic	Dede Feldman (incumbent)	10,229	100%
Total votes		10,229	100%
Democratic hold			

=== District 14 ===
Incumbent Democrat and President pro Tempore Manny Aragon had represented the 14th district since 1975.

Democratic primary

New Mexico Senate 14th district Democratic primary election, 2000
Party	Candidate	Votes	%
Democratic	Manny Aragon (incumbent)	1,329	53.14%
Democratic	Tony Padilla	591	23.63%
Democratic	Andy Padilla	581	23.23%
Total votes		2,501	100%

Republican primary

New Mexico Senate 14th district Republican primary election, 2000
Party	Candidate	Votes	%
Republican	Bill Paiz	272	50.09%
Republican	James RR Nessle	271	49.91%
Total votes		543	100%

General election

New Mexico Senate 14th district general election, 2000
Party	Candidate	Votes	%
Democratic	Manny Aragon (incumbent)	4,573	55.38%
Republican	Bill Paiz	3,682	44.59%
Independent	Hector Correa (write-in)	3	0.04%
Total votes		8,258	100%
Democratic hold			

=== District 15 ===
Incumbent Republican and Minority Leader Skip Vernon had represented the 15th district since 1985. Vernon retired to run for Bernalillo County district attorney, and fellow Republican Diane Snyder won the open seat.

Republican primary

New Mexico Senate 15th district Republican primary election, 2000
Party	Candidate	Votes	%
Republican	Diane Snyder	1,351	52.84%
Republican	Ken Whiton	1,206	47.16%
Total votes		2,557	100%

General election

New Mexico Senate 15th district general election, 2000
Party	Candidate	Votes	%
Republican	Diane Snyder	7,958	53.50%
Democratic	Andrew Mills	6,917	46.50%
Total votes		14,875	100%
Republican hold			

=== District 16 ===
Incumbent Democrat Cisco McSorley had represented the 16th district since 1997.

Democratic primary

New Mexico Senate 16th district Democratic primary election, 2000
Party	Candidate	Votes	%
Democratic	Cisco McSorley (incumbent)	1,898	66.41%
Democratic	Carmie Lynn Toulouse	960	33.59%
Total votes		2,858	100%

General election

New Mexico Senate 16th district general election, 2000
Party	Candidate	Votes	%
Democratic	Cisco McSorley (incumbent)	11,084	100%
Total votes		11,084	100%
Democratic hold			

=== District 17 ===
Incumbent Democrat Shannon Robinson had represented the 17th district since 1989.

New Mexico Senate 17th district general election, 2000
Party	Candidate	Votes	%
Democratic	Shannon Robinson (incumbent)	5,169	59.05%
Republican	Mary Gilbert	3,584	40.95%
Total votes		8,753	100%
Democratic hold			

=== District 18 ===
Incumbent Republican Mark Boitano had represented the 18th district since 1997.

New Mexico Senate 18th district general election, 2000
Party	Candidate	Votes	%
Republican	Mark Boitano (incumbent)	10,971	100%
Total votes		10,971	100%
Republican hold			

=== District 19 ===
Incumbent Republican Sue Wilson had represented the 19th district since 1997.

New Mexico Senate 19th district general election, 2000
Party	Candidate	Votes	%
Republican	Sue Wilson (incumbent)	12,917	100%
Total votes		12,917	100%
Republican hold			

=== District 20 ===
Incumbent Republican William Payne had represented the 20th district since 1997.

New Mexico Senate 20th district general election, 2000
Party	Candidate	Votes	%
Republican	William Payne (incumbent)	12,228	100%
Total votes		12,228	100%
Republican hold			

=== District 21 ===
Incumbent Republican William Davis had represented the 21st district since 1997. Davis did not seek re-election, and fellow Republican Kent Cravens won the open seat.

Republican primary

New Mexico Senate 21st district Republican primary election, 2000
Party	Candidate	Votes	%
Republican	Kent Cravens	1,478	34.47%
Republican	Richard Murray	1,284	29.94%
Republican	Victor Marshall	812	18.94%
Republican	Mariah Davis	500	11.66%
Republican	David Quintana	214	4.99%
Total votes		4,288	100%

General election

New Mexico Senate 21st district general election, 2000
Party	Candidate	Votes	%
Republican	Kent Cravens	17,866	100%
Total votes		17,866	100%
Republican hold			

=== District 22 ===
Incumbent Democrat Leonard Tsosie had represented the 22nd district since 1993.

New Mexico Senate 22nd district general election, 2000
Party	Candidate	Votes	%
Democratic	Leonard Tsosie (incumbent)	9,229	100%
Total votes		9,229	100%
Democratic hold			

=== District 23 ===
Incumbent Republican Joseph Carraro had represented the 23rd district since 1993.

New Mexico Senate 23rd district general election, 2000
Party	Candidate	Votes	%
Republican	Joseph Carraro (incumbent)	15,571	82.70%
Libertarian	Ronald Bjornstad	3,258	17.30%
Total votes		18,829	100%
Republican hold			

=== District 24 ===
Incumbent Democrat Nancy Rodriguez had represented the 24th district since 1997.

Democratic primary

New Mexico Senate 24th district Democratic primary election, 2000
Party	Candidate	Votes	%
Democratic	Nancy Rodriguez (incumbent)	3,193	62.22%
Democratic	Rudy "Froggy" Fernandez	1,939	37.78%
Total votes		5,132	100%

General election

New Mexico Senate 24th district general election, 2000
Party	Candidate	Votes	%
Democratic	Nancy Rodriguez (incumbent)	11,075	100%
Total votes		11,075	100%
Democratic hold			

=== District 25 ===
Incumbent Democrat Roman Maes III had represented the 25th district since 1985.

Democratic primary

New Mexico Senate 25th district Democratic primary election, 2000
Party	Candidate	Votes	%
Democratic	Roman Maes III (incumbent)	3,559	52.46%
Democratic	Letitia Montoya	3,225	47.54%
Total votes		6,784	100%

General election

New Mexico Senate 25th district general election, 2000
Party	Candidate	Votes	%
Democratic	Roman Maes III (incumbent)	12,720	62.48%
Green	Ann Tyner Gleason	7,638	37.52%
Total votes		20,358	100%
Democratic hold			

=== District 26 ===
Incumbent Democrat Phillip Maloof had represented the 26th district since 1994. Maloof did not seek re-election, and fellow Democrat Bernadette Sanchez won the open seat.

Democratic primary

New Mexico Senate 26th district Democratic primary election, 2000
Party	Candidate	Votes	%
Democratic	Bernadette Sanchez	1,861	51.71%
Democratic	Joe Nestor Chavez	1,738	48.29%
Total votes		3,599	100%

General election

New Mexico Senate 26th district general election, 2000
Party	Candidate	Votes	%
Democratic	Bernadette Sanchez	9,487	63.86%
Republican	Jerry Daniele	5,368	36.14%
Total votes		14,855	100%
Democratic hold			

=== District 27 ===
Incumbent Republican Stuart Ingle had represented the 27th district since 1985.

New Mexico Senate 27th district general election, 2000
Party	Candidate	Votes	%
Republican	Stuart Ingle (incumbent)	6,221	100%
Total votes		6,221	100%
Republican hold			

=== District 28 ===
Incumbent Democrat Ben Altamirano had represented the 28th district since 1971.

New Mexico Senate 28th district general election, 2000
Party	Candidate	Votes	%
Democratic	Ben Altamirano (incumbent)	9,339	60.82%
Republican	Richard Choate	6,017	39.18%
Total votes		15,356	100%
Democratic hold			

=== District 29 ===
Incumbent Democrat Michael Sanchez had represented the 29th district since 1993.

New Mexico Senate 29th district general election, 2000
Party	Candidate	Votes	%
Democratic	Michael Sanchez (incumbent)	8,597	51.24%
Republican	David Chavez	7,541	44.94%
Independent	Alfred Bennett III	641	3.82%
Total votes		16,779	100%
Democratic hold			

=== District 30 ===
Incumbent Democrat Joseph Fidel had represented the 30th district since 1973.

New Mexico Senate 30th district general election, 2000
Party	Candidate	Votes	%
Democratic	Joseph Fidel (incumbent)	10,498	100%
Total votes		10,498	100%
Democratic hold			

=== District 31 ===
Incumbent Democrat Cynthia Nava had represented the 31st district since 1993.

New Mexico Senate 31st district general election, 2000
Party	Candidate	Votes	%
Democratic	Cynthia Nava (incumbent)	5,466	59.25%
Republican	Samuel Reyes	3,759	40.75%
Total votes		9,225	100%
Democratic hold			

=== District 32 ===
Incumbent Democrat Timothy Jennings had represented the 32nd district since 1979.

New Mexico Senate 32nd district general election, 2000
Party	Candidate	Votes	%
Democratic	Timothy Jennings (incumbent)	4,928	59.19%
Republican	Henry Zuniga	3,398	40.81%
Total votes		8,326	100%
Democratic hold			

=== District 33 ===
Incumbent Republican Rod Adair had represented the 33rd district since 1997.

New Mexico Senate New Mexico Senate 33rd district general election, 2000
Party	Candidate	Votes	%
Republican	Rod Adair (incumbent)	10,326	100%
Total votes		10,326	100%
Republican hold			

=== District 34 ===
Incumbent Republican Don Kidd had represented the 34th district since 1993.

New Mexico Senate 34th district general election, 2000
Party	Candidate	Votes	%
Republican	Don Kidd (incumbent)	9,955	100%
Total votes		9,955	100%
Republican hold			

=== District 35 ===
Incumbent Democrat John Arthur Smith had represented the 35th district since 1989.

New Mexico Senate 35th district general election, 2000
Party	Candidate	Votes	%
Democratic	John Arthur Smith (incumbent)	9,346	100%
Total votes		9,346	100%
Democratic hold			

=== District 36 ===
Incumbent Democrat Mary Jane Garcia had represented the 36th district since 1989.

Republican primary

New Mexico Senate 36th district Republican primary election, 2000
Party	Candidate	Votes	%
Republican	John Townsend III	630	52.63%
Republican	Maria Sutton	567	47.37%
Total votes		1,197	100%

General election

New Mexico Senate 36th district general election, 2000
Party	Candidate	Votes	%
Democratic	Mary Jane Garcia (incumbent)	6,876	58.51%
Republican	John Townsend III	4,875	41.49%
Total votes		11,751	100%
Democratic hold			

=== District 37 ===
Incumbent Republican Leonard Lee Rawson had represented the 37th district since 1993.

New Mexico Senate 37th district general election, 2000
Party	Candidate	Votes	%
Republican	Leonard Lee Rawson (incumbent)	9,050	71.29%
Independent	Vincent Dovydaitis Jr.	3,645	28.71%
Total votes		12,695	100%
Republican hold			

=== District 38 ===
Incumbent Democrat Fernando Macias had represented the 38th district since 1985. Macias did not seek re-election, and fellow Democrat Mary Kay Papen won the open seat.

Democratic primary

New Mexico Senate 38th district Democratic primary election, 2000
Party	Candidate	Votes	%
Democratic	Mary Kay Papen	1,319	54.30%
Democratic	E. Shirley Baca	1,110	45.70%
Total votes		2,429	100%

General election

New Mexico Senate 38th district general election, 2000
Party	Candidate	Votes	%
Democratic	Mary Kay Papen	6,560	59.24%
Republican	Narendra Gunaji	4,514	40.76%
Total votes		11,074	100%
Democratic hold			

=== District 39 ===
Incumbent Democrat Phil Griego had represented the 39th district since 1997.

Democratic primary

New Mexico Senate 39th district Democratic primary election, 2000
Party	Candidate	Votes	%
Democratic	Phil Griego (incumbent)	2,974	52.59%
Democratic	Liz Stefanics	2,681	47.41%
Total votes		5,655	100%

General election

New Mexico Senate 39th district general election, 2000
Party	Candidate	Votes	%
Democratic	Phil Griego (incumbent)	9,108	56.13%
Republican	Robert Skigen	7,118	43.87%
Total votes		16,226	100%
Democratic hold			

=== District 40 ===
Incumbent Republican Dianna Duran had represented the 40th district since 1993.

Republican primary

New Mexico Senate 40th district Republican primary election, 2000
Party	Candidate	Votes	%
Republican	Dianna Duran (incumbent)	2,584	85.42%
Republican	George Caruso	441	14.58%
Total votes		3,025	100%

General election

New Mexico Senate 40th district general election, 2000
Party	Candidate	Votes	%
Republican	Dianna Duran (incumbent)	9,186	69.12%
Democratic	Mable Frary	4,104	30.88%
Total votes		13,290	100%
Republican hold			

=== District 41 ===
Incumbent Republican Carroll Leavell had represented the 41st district since 1997.

New Mexico Senate 41st district general election, 2000
Party	Candidate	Votes	%
Republican	Carroll Leavell (incumbent)	4,574	100%
Total votes		4,574	100%
Republican hold			

=== District 42 ===
Incumbent Republican Billy McKibben had represented the 42nd district since 1981. McKibben did not seek re-election, and fellow Republican Shirley Bailey won the open seat.

New Mexico Senate 42nd district general election, 2000
Party	Candidate	Votes	%
Republican	Shirley Bailey	9,149	92.65%
Independent	John Norris (write-in)	726	7.35%
Total votes		9,875	100%
Republican hold			

== See also ==
- 2000 United States elections
- 2000 United States presidential election in New Mexico
- 2000 United States Senate election in New Mexico
- 2000 United States House of Representatives elections in New Mexico
- 2000 New Mexico House of Representatives election
