= 2008 New Mexico Senate election =

- November 4, 2008

All 42 seats in the New Mexico Senate 22 seats needed for a majority
	Majority party	Minority party
Leader	Timothy Jennings	Stuart Ingle
Party	Democratic	Republican
Leader's seat	32nd - Roswell	27th - Portales
Last election	24	18
Seats before	24	18
Seats won	27	15
Seat change	▲3	▼3
Popular vote	402,496	266,663
Percentage	60.15%	39.85%
- Results: Democratic gain Democratic hold Republican hold
President pro tempore before election
Timothy Jennings
Democratic
Elected President pro tempore
Timothy Jennings
Democratic

The 2008 New Mexico Senate election took place as part of the biennial United States elections. New Mexico voters elected state senators in all 42 of the state senate's districts. State senators serve four-year terms in the New Mexico Senate. The election coincided with elections for other offices, including for U.S. President, U.S. Senate, U.S House, and state house.

A primary election on June 3, 2008, determined which candidates appeared on the November 4th general election ballot.

== Results summary ==
District	Incumbent	Party	Elected senator	Party
1	William Sharer	Rep	William Sharer	Rep
2	Steven Neville	Rep	Steven Neville	Rep
3	John Pinto	Dem	John Pinto	Dem
4	Lidio Rainaldi	Dem	George Muñoz	Dem
5	Richard Martinez	Dem	Richard Martinez	Dem
6	Carlos Cisneros	Dem	Carlos Cisneros	Dem
7	Clinton Harden	Rep	Clinton Harden	Rep
8	Pete Campos	Dem	Pete Campos	Dem
9	Steve Komadina	Rep	John Sapien	Dem
10	John Ryan	Rep	John Ryan	Rep
11	Linda Lopez	Dem	Linda Lopez	Dem
12	Jerry Ortiz y Pino	Dem	Jerry Ortiz y Pino	Dem
13	Dede Feldman	Dem	Dede Feldman	Dem
14	James Taylor	Dem	Eric Griego	Dem
15	Diane Snyder	Rep	Tim Eichenberg	Dem
16	Cisco McSorley	Dem	Cisco McSorley	Dem
17	Shannon Robinson	Dem	Tim Keller	Dem
18	Mark Boitano	Rep	Mark Boitano	Rep
19	Sue Wilson Beffort	Rep	Sue Wilson Beffort	Rep
20	William Payne	Rep	William Payne	Rep
21	Kent Cravens	Rep	Kent Cravens	Rep
22	Lynda Lovejoy	Dem	Lynda Lovejoy	Dem
23	Joseph Carraro	Rep	Sander Rue	Rep
24	Nancy Rodriguez	Dem	Nancy Rodriguez	Dem
25	John Grubesic	Dem	Peter Wirth	Dem
26	Bernadette Sanchez	Dem	Bernadette Sanchez	Dem
27	Stuart Ingle	Rep	Stuart Ingle	Rep
28	Howie Morales	Dem	Howie Morales	Dem
29	Michael Sanchez	Dem	Michael Sanchez	Dem
30	David Ulibarri	Dem	David Ulibarri	Dem
31	Cynthia Nava	Dem	Cynthia Nava	Dem
32	Timothy Jennings	Dem	Timothy Jennings	Dem
33	Rod Adair	Rep	Rod Adair	Rep
34	Vernon Asbill	Rep	Vernon Asbill	Rep
35	John Arthur Smith	Dem	John Arthur Smith	Dem
36	Mary Jane Garcia	Dem	Mary Jane Garcia	Dem
37	Leonard Lee Rawson	Rep	Stephen Fischmann	Dem
38	Mary Kay Papen	Dem	Mary Kay Papen	Dem
39	Phil Griego	Dem	Phil Griego	Dem
40	Dianna Duran	Rep	Dianna Duran	Rep
41	Carroll Leavell	Rep	Carroll Leavell	Rep
42	Gay Kernan	Rep	Gay Kernan	Rep

Party	Candi- dates	Votes		Seats		
Party	Candi- dates	No.	%	No.	+/–	%
Democratic	31	402,496	60.15%	25	▲3	64.29%
Republican	23	266,663	39.85%	17	▼3	35.71%
Total	54	669,159	100%	42	Steady	100%

Popular vote
Democratic	60.15%
Republican	39.85%

Senate seats
Democratic	64.29%
Republican	35.71%

=== Retiring incumbents ===
- Lidio Rainaldi (D-District 4)
- Joseph Carraro (R-District 23), to run for Congress
- John Grubesic (D-District 25)

=== Incumbents defeated in the primary election ===
- James Taylor (D-District 14), defeated by Eric Griego (D)
- Shannon Robinson (D-District 17), defeated by Tim Keller (D)

=== Incumbents defeated in the general election ===
- Steve Komadina (R-District 9), defeated by John Sapien (D)
- Diane Snyder (R-District 15), defeated by Tim Eichenberg (D)
- Leonard Lee Rawson (R-District 37), defeated by Stephen Fischmann (D)

== Predictions ==
Source	Ranking	As of
Stateline	Safe D	October 15, 2008

== Detailed results ==
Source for primary election results: Source for general election results:

=== District 1 ===
Incumbent Republican William Sharer has represented the 1st district since 2001.

New Mexico Senate 1st district general election, 2008
Party	Candidate	Votes	%
Republican	William Sharer (incumbent)	14,032	100%
Total votes		14,032	100%
Republican hold			

=== District 2 ===
Incumbent Republican Steven Neville has represented the 2nd district since 2005.

New Mexico Senate 2nd district general election, 2008
Party	Candidate	Votes	%
Republican	Steven Neville (incumbent)	14,223	100%
Total votes		14,223	100%
Republican hold			

=== District 3 ===
Incumbent Democrat John Pinto has represented the 3rd district since 1977. Democratic primary

New Mexico Senate 3rd district Democratic primary election, 2008
Party	Candidate	Votes	%
Democratic	John Pinto (incumbent)	2,869	78.52%
Democratic	Willis Nez	785	21.48%
Total votes		3,654	100%

General election

New Mexico Senate 3rd district general election, 2008
Party	Candidate	Votes	%
Democratic	John Pinto (incumbent)	12,121	100%
Total votes		12,121	100%
Democratic hold			

=== District 4 ===
Incumbent Democrat Lidio Rainaldi has represented the 4th district since 2001. Rainaldi didn't seek re-election and fellow Democrat George Muñoz won the open seat. Democratic primary

New Mexico Senate 4th district Democratic primary election, 2008
Party	Candidate	Votes	%
Democratic	George Muñoz	1,933	43.19%
Democratic	Virginia Ballenger	1,547	34.56%
Democratic	Laverne Wyaco	687	15.35%
Democratic	Edward Smith	309	6.90%
Total votes		4,476	100%

General election

New Mexico Senate 4th district general election, 2008
Party	Candidate	Votes	%
Democratic	George Muñoz	10,897	75.61%
Republican	Beatrice Woodward	3,515	24.39%
Total votes		14,412	100%
Democratic hold			

=== District 5 ===
Incumbent Democrat Richard Martinez has represented the 5th district since 2001.

New Mexico Senate 5th district general election, 2008
Party	Candidate	Votes	%
Democratic	Richard Martinez (incumbent)	14,975	100%
Total votes		14,975	100%
Democratic hold			

=== District 6 ===
Incumbent Democrat Carlos Cisneros has represented the 6th district since 1985. Democratic primary

New Mexico Senate 6th district Democratic primary election, 2008
Party	Candidate	Votes	%
Democratic	Carlos Cisneros (incumbent)	3,855	52.48%
Democratic	Erminio Martinez	2,648	36.05%
Democratic	Archie Velarde	843	11.48%
Total votes		7,346	100%

General election

New Mexico Senate 6th district general election, 2008
Party	Candidate	Votes	%
Democratic	Carlos Cisneros (incumbent)	18,037	100%
Total votes		18,037	100%
Democratic hold			

=== District 7 ===
Incumbent Republican Clinton Harden has represented the 7th district since 2003.

New Mexico Senate 7th district general election, 2008
Party	Candidate	Votes	%
Republican	Clinton Harden (incumbent)	10,891	59.07%
Democratic	Thomas Jeffrey Carr	7,547	40.93%
Total votes		18,438	100%
Republican hold			

=== District 8 ===
Incumbent Democrat Pete Campos has represented the 8th district since 1991.

New Mexico Senate 8th district general election, 2008
Party	Candidate	Votes	%
Democratic	Pete Campos (incumbent)	13,254	100%
Total votes		13,254	100%
Democratic hold			

=== District 9 ===
Incumbent Republican Steve Komadina has represented the 9th district since 2001. Komadina lost re-election to Democrat John Sapien. Republican primary

New Mexico Senate 9th district Republican primary election, 2008
Party	Candidate	Votes	%
Republican	Steve Komadina (incumbent)	2,085	71.75%
Republican	J. Barry Bitzer	821	28.25%
Total votes		2,906	100%

General election

New Mexico Senate 9th district general election, 2008
Party	Candidate	Votes	%
Democratic	John Sapien	11,981	50.25%
Republican	Steve Komadina (incumbent)	11,860	49.75%
Total votes		23,841	100%
Democratic gain from Republican			

=== District 10 ===
Incumbent Republican John Ryan has represented the 10th district since 2005. Democratic primary

New Mexico Senate 10th district Democratic primary election, 2008
Party	Candidate	Votes	%
Democratic	Victor Paul Raigoza	1,991	51.78%
Democratic	Joel Davis	1,854	48.22%
Total votes		3,845	100%

Republican primary

New Mexico Senate 10th district Republican primary election, 2008
Party	Candidate	Votes	%
Republican	John Ryan (incumbent)	2,672	65.09%
Republican	Robert Kevin Sikes	1,433	34.91%
Total votes		4,105	100%

General election

New Mexico Senate 10th district general election, 2008
Party	Candidate	Votes	%
Republican	John Ryan (incumbent)	13,776	51.22%
Democratic	Victor Paul Raigoza	13,120	48.78%
Total votes		26,896	100%
Republican hold			

=== District 11 ===
Incumbent Democrat Linda Lopez has represented the 11th district since 1997. Democratic primary

New Mexico Senate 10th district Democratic primary election, 2008
Party	Candidate	Votes	%
Democratic	Linda Lopez (incumbent)	1,886	53.25%
Democratic	Michael Padilla	1,656	46.75%
Total votes		3,542	100%

General election

New Mexico Senate 11th district general election, 2008
Party	Candidate	Votes	%
Democratic	Linda Lopez (incumbent)	14,253	100%
Total votes		14,253	100%
Democratic hold			

=== District 12 ===
Incumbent Democrat Jerry Ortiz y Pino has represented the 12th district since 2005.

New Mexico Senate 12th district general election, 2008
Party	Candidate	Votes	%
Democratic	Jerry Ortiz y Pino (incumbent)	12,828	100%
Total votes		12,828	100%
Democratic hold			

=== District 13 ===
Incumbent Democrat Dede Feldman has represented the 13th district since 1997. Democratic primary

New Mexico Senate 13th district Democratic primary election, 2008
Party	Candidate	Votes	%
Democratic	Dede Feldman (incumbent)	4,282	79.08%
Democratic	Carlos Cordova	1,133	20.92%
Total votes		5,415	100%

General election

New Mexico Senate 13th district general election, 2008
Party	Candidate	Votes	%
Democratic	Dede Feldman (incumbent)	17,412	100%
Total votes		17,412	100%
Democratic hold			

=== District 14 ===
Incumbent Democrat James Taylor has represented the 14th district since 2005. Taylor lost re-nomination to fellow Democrat Eric Griego, who was unopposed in the general election. Democratic primary

New Mexico Senate 14th district Democratic primary election, 2008
Party	Candidate	Votes	%
Democratic	Eric Griego	2,111	62.36%
Democratic	James Taylor (incumbent)	1,274	37.64%
Total votes		3,385	100%

General election

New Mexico Senate 14th district general election, 2008
Party	Candidate	Votes	%
Democratic	Eric Griego	10,807	100%
Total votes		10,807	100%
Democratic hold			

=== District 15 ===
Incumbent Republican Diane Snyder has represented the 15th district since 2001. Snyder lost re-election to Democrat Tim Eichenberg. Democratic primary

New Mexico Senate 15th district Democratic primary election, 2008
Party	Candidate	Votes	%
Democratic	Tim Eichenberg	2,413	59.36%
Democratic	John Blair	1,652	40.64%
Total votes		4,065	100%

General election

New Mexico Senate 15th district general election, 2008
Party	Candidate	Votes	%
Democratic	Tim Eichenberg	12,643	56.52%
Republican	Diane Snyder (incumbent)	9,728	43.48%
Total votes		22,371	100%
Democratic gain from Republican			

=== District 16 ===
Incumbent Democrat Cisco McSorley has represented the 16th district since 1997.

New Mexico Senate 16th district general election, 2008
Party	Candidate	Votes	%
Democratic	Cisco McSorley (incumbent)	16,369	100%
Total votes		16,369	100%
Democratic hold			

=== District 17 ===
Incumbent Democrat Shannon Robinson has represented the 17th district since 1989. Robinson lost re-nomination to fellow Democrat Tim Keller, who was unopposed in the general election. Democratic primary

New Mexico Senate 17th district general election, 2008
Party	Candidate	Votes	%
Democratic	Tim Keller	1,614	65.99%
Democratic	Shannon Robinson (incumbent)	832	34.01%
Total votes		2,446	100%

General election

New Mexico Senate 17th district general election, 2008
Party	Candidate	Votes	%
Democratic	Tim Keller	9,275	100%
Total votes		9,275	100%
Democratic hold			

=== District 18 ===
Incumbent Republican Mark Boitano has represented the 18th district since 1997.

New Mexico Senate 18th district general election, 2008
Party	Candidate	Votes	%
Republican	Mark Boitano (incumbent)	13,980	100%
Total votes		13,980	100%
Republican hold			

=== District 19 ===
Incumbent Republican Sue Wilson Beffort has represented the 19th district since 1997.

New Mexico Senate 19th district general election, 2008
Party	Candidate	Votes	%
Republican	Sue Wilson Beffort (incumbent)	14,266	60.39%
Democratic	Jason Michael Burnette	9,357	39.61%
Total votes		23,623	100%
Republican hold			

=== District 20 ===
Incumbent Republican William Payne has represented the 20th district since 1997.

New Mexico Senate 20th district general election, 2008
Party	Candidate	Votes	%
Republican	William Payne (incumbent)	14,068	100%
Total votes		14,068	100%
Republican hold			

=== District 21 ===
Incumbent Republican Kent Cravens has represented the 21st district since 2001.

New Mexico Senate 21st district general election, 2008
Party	Candidate	Votes	%
Republican	Kent Cravens (incumbent)	15,638	56.96%
Democratic	Jessica Lynn Wolfe	11,818	43.04%
Total votes		27,456	100%
Republican hold			

=== District 22 ===
Incumbent Democrat Lynda Lovejoy has represented the 22nd district since her appointment in 2007 following the resignation of Leonard Tsosie. Lovejoy was elected to a full term. Democratic primary

New Mexico Senate 22nd district Democratic primary election, 2008
Party	Candidate	Votes	%
Democratic	Lynda Lovejoy (incumbent)	1,883	36.52%
Democratic	Everett Chavez	1,484	28.78%
Democratic	Joshua Madalena	1,173	22.75%
Democratic	Billy Moore	616	11.95%
Total votes		5,156	100%

General election

New Mexico Senate 22nd district general election, 2008
Party	Candidate	Votes	%
Democratic	Lynda Lovejoy (incumbent)	16,908	100%
Total votes		16,908	100%
Democratic hold			

=== District 23 ===
Incumbent Republican Joseph Carraro has represented the 23rd district since 1993. Carraro retired to run for Congress and fellow Republican Sander Rue won the open seat. Republican primary

New Mexico Senate 23rd district Republican primary election, 2008
Party	Candidate	Votes	%
Republican	Sander Rue	2,218	53.73%
Republican	David Trenton Pyne	1,910	46.27%
Total votes		4,128	100%

General election

New Mexico Senate 23rd district general election, 2008
Party	Candidate	Votes	%
Republican	Sander Rue	22,338	100%
Total votes		22,338	100%
Republican hold			

=== District 24 ===
Incumbent Democrat Nancy Rodriguez has represented the 24th district since 1997.

New Mexico Senate 24th district general election, 2008
Party	Candidate	Votes	%
Democratic	Nancy Rodriguez (incumbent)	15,852	100%
Total votes		15,852	100%
Democratic hold			

=== District 25 ===
Incumbent Democratic John Grubesic has represented the 25th district since 2005. Grubesic didn't seek re-election and Democratic State Representative Peter Wirth won the open seat.

New Mexico Senate 25th district general election, 2008
Party	Candidate	Votes	%
Democratic	Peter Wirth	24,902	100%
Total votes		24,902	100%
Democratic hold			

=== District 26 ===
Incumbent Democrat Bernadette Sanchez has represented the 26th district since 2001.

New Mexico Senate 26th district general election, 2008
Party	Candidate	Votes	%
Democratic	Bernadette Sanchez (incumbent)	13,750	75.68%
Republican	Spiro Gregory Vassilopoulos	4,419	24.32%
Total votes		18,169	100%
Democratic hold			

=== District 27 ===
Incumbent Republican Minority Leader Stuart Ingle has represented the 27th district since 1985.

New Mexico Senate 27th district general election, 2008
Party	Candidate	Votes	%
Republican	Stuart Ingle (incumbent)	9,466	100%
Total votes		9,466	100%
Republican hold			

=== District 28 ===
Incumbent Democrat Howie Morales has represented the 28th district since his appointment in 2008 following the death of Ben Altamirano. Morales was elected to a full term. Democratic primary

New Mexico Senate 28th district Democratic primary election, 2008
Party	Candidate	Votes	%
Democratic	Howie Morales (incumbent)	4,912	88.00%
Democratic	Christopher Aquino	670	12.00%
Total votes		5,582	100%

General election

New Mexico Senate 28th district general election, 2008
Party	Candidate	Votes	%
Democratic	Howie Morales (incumbent)	13,546	66.61%
Republican	Joseph Gros	6,790	33.39%
Total votes		20,336	100%
Democratic hold			

=== District 29 ===
Incumbent Democrat Michael Sanchez has represented the 29th district since 1993.

New Mexico Senate 29th district general election, 2008
Party	Candidate	Votes	%
Democratic	Michael Sanchez (incumbent)	14,633	100%
Total votes		14,633	100%
Democratic hold			

=== District 30 ===
Incumbent Democrat David Ulibarri has represented the 30th district since his appointment in 2006 following the resignation of Joseph Fidel. Ulibarri was elected to a full term. Democratic primary

New Mexico Senate 30th district Democratic primary election, 2008
Party	Candidate	Votes	%
Democratic	David Ulibarri (incumbent)	1,662	36.19%
Democratic	Clemente Sanchez	1,654	36.02%
Democratic	June Lorenzo	1,276	27.79%
Total votes		4,592	100%

General election

New Mexico Senate 30th district general election, 2008
Party	Candidate	Votes	%
Democratic	David Ulibarri (incumbent)	8,262	52.59%
Republican	Jose Silva	7,447	47.41%
Total votes		15,709	100%
Democratic hold			

=== District 31 ===
Incumbent Democrat Cynthia Nava has represented the 31st district since 1993.

New Mexico Senate 31st district general election, 2008
Party	Candidate	Votes	%
Democratic	Cynthia Nava (incumbent)	7,550	100%
Total votes		7,550	100%
Democratic hold			

=== District 32 ===
Incumbent Democrat and President pro tempore Timothy Jennings has represented the 32nd district since 1979.

New Mexico Senate 32nd district general election, 2008
Party	Candidate	Votes	%
Democratic	Timothy Jennings (incumbent)	8,721	100%
Total votes		8,721	100%
Democratic hold			

=== District 33 ===
Incumbent Republican Rod Adair has represented the 33rd district since 1997. Republican primary

New Mexico Senate New Mexico Senate 33rd district Republican primary election, 2008
Party	Candidate	Votes	%
Republican	Rod Adair (incumbent)	3,335	53.47%
Republican	Rory McMinn	2,902	46.53%
Total votes		6,237	100%

General election

New Mexico Senate New Mexico Senate 33rd district general election, 2008
Party	Candidate	Votes	%
Republican	Rod Adair (incumbent)	14,274	100%
Total votes		14,274	100%
Republican hold			

=== District 34 ===
Incumbent Republican Vernon Asbill has represented the 34th district since 2005.

New Mexico Senate 34th district general election, 2008
Party	Candidate	Votes	%
Republican	Vernon Asbill (incumbent)	14,122	100%
Total votes		14,122	100%
Republican hold			

=== District 35 ===
Incumbent Democrat John Arthur Smith has represented the 35th district since 1989.

New Mexico Senate 35th district general election, 2008
Party	Candidate	Votes	%
Democratic	John Arthur Smith (incumbent)	10,636	100%
Total votes		10,636	100%
Democratic hold			

=== District 36 ===
Incumbent Democrat Mary Jane Garcia has represented the 36th district since 1989. Democratic primary

New Mexico Senate 36th district Democratic primary election, 2008
Party	Candidate	Votes	%
Democratic	Mary Jane Garcia (incumbent)	1,960	67.75%
Democratic	Oscar Vasquez Butler	933	32.25%
Total votes		2,893	100%

General election

New Mexico Senate 36th district general election, 2008
Party	Candidate	Votes	%
Democratic	Mary Jane Garcia (incumbent)	9,411	54.88%
Republican	Lee Cotter	7,736	45.12%
Total votes		17,147	100%
Democratic hold			

=== District 37 ===
Incumbent Republican Leonard Lee Rawson has represented the 37th district since 1993. Rawson lost re-election to Democrat Stephen Fischmann.

New Mexico Senate 37th district general election, 2008
Party	Candidate	Votes	%
Democratic	Stephen Fischmann	13,229	51.13%
Republican	Leonard Lee Rawson (incumbent)	12,643	48.87%
Total votes		25,872	100%
Democratic gain from Republican			

=== District 38 ===
Incumbent Democrat Mary Kay Papen has represented the 38th district since 2001.

New Mexico Senate 38th district general election, 2008
Party	Candidate	Votes	%
Democratic	Mary Kay Papen (incumbent)	12,157	100%
Total votes		12,157	100%
Democratic hold			

=== District 39 ===
Incumbent Democrat Phil Griego has represented the 39th district since 1997.

New Mexico Senate 39th district general election, 2008
Party	Candidate	Votes	%
Democratic	Phil Griego (incumbent)	16,245	100%
Total votes		16,245	100%
Democratic hold			

=== District 40 ===
Incumbent Republican Dianna Duran has represented the 40th district since 1993.

New Mexico Senate 40th district general election, 2008
Party	Candidate	Votes	%
Republican	Dianna Duran (incumbent)	10,230	100%
Total votes		10,230	100%
Republican hold			

=== District 41 ===
Incumbent Republican Carroll Leavell has represented the 41st district since 1997.

New Mexico Senate 41st district general election, 2008
Party	Candidate	Votes	%
Republican	Carroll Leavell (incumbent)	8,702	100%
Total votes		8,702	100%
Republican hold			

=== District 42 ===
Incumbent Republican Gay Kernan has represented the th district since 2002.

New Mexico Senate 42nd district general election, 2008
Party	Candidate	Votes	%
Republican	Gay Kernan (incumbent)	12,519	100%
Total votes		12,519	100%
Republican hold			

== See also ==
- 2008 United States elections
- 2008 United States presidential election in New Mexico
- 2008 United States House of Representatives elections in New Mexico
- 2008 New Mexico House of Representatives election
