= 1996 New Mexico Senate election =

- November 5, 1996

All 42 seats in the New Mexico Senate 22 seats needed for a majority

	Majority party	Minority party
Leader	Manny Aragon
Party	Democratic	Republican
Leader since	1988
Leader's seat	District 14
Last election	27	15
Seats after	25	17
Seat change	▼2	▲2
Popular vote	267,200	228,391
Percentage	53.59%	45.81%
President pro tempore before election
Manny Aragon
Democratic
Elected President pro tempore
Manny Aragon
Democratic

The 1996 New Mexico Senate election was held on November 5, 1996, to determine which party would control the New Mexico Senate for the following four years in the 43rd New Mexico Legislature. All 42 seats in the New Mexico Senate were up for election. Prior to the election, 27 seats were held by Democrats and 15 seats were held by Republicans. The general election saw Republicans flip a two seats, thereby meaning that Democrats retained their majority in the State Senate.

== Retirements ==
=== Democrats ===
1. District 13: Tito D. Chavez retired.
2. District 16: Thomas T. Rutherford retired.
3. District 24: Edward J. Lopez retired.
4. District 41: Cary Don Reagan retired.

=== Republicans ===
1. District 2: Christine Donisthorpe retired.
2. District 19: Duncan Scott retired.
3. District 20: Michael C. Wiener retired.
4. District 33: Emmit M. Jennings retired.

== Incumbents defeated ==
=== In primary ===
==== Democrats ====
1. District 5: Emilio Naranjo lost renomination to Arthur Rodarte.
2. District 11: Tom R. Benavides lost renomination to Linda M. Lopez.
3. District 39: Liz Stefanics lost renomination to Phil Griego.

==== Republicans ====
1. District 21: Tom C. Wray lost renomination to William Davis.

=== In general ===
==== Democrats ====
1. District 10: Janice D. Paster lost re-election to Ramsay Gorham.
2. District 18: Ann J. Riley lost re-election to Mark Boitano.

==== Republicans ====
1. District 9: Virgil O. Rhodes lost re-election to Pauline Eisenstadt.

== Closest races ==
Seats where the margin of victory was under 10%:

1. District 38, 0.10%
2. District 41, 2.82% (gain)
3. District 36, 3.00%
4. District 9, 3.02% (gain)
5. District 10, 5.08% (gain)
6. District 29, 6.60%
7. District 15, 6.82%

== Results ==
=== District 1 ===
District 1 election, 1996
Party	Candidate	Votes	%
Republican	Raymond Kysar (incumbent)	11,126	100.0%
Total votes		11,126	100.0%
Republican hold			

=== District 2 ===
District 2 election, 1996
Party	Candidate	Votes	%
Republican	R. L. Stockard	7,157	55.91%
Democratic	Darla Whitney-Welles	5,644	44.09%
Total votes		12,801	100.0%
Republican hold			

=== District 3 ===
District 3 election, 1996
Party	Candidate	Votes	%
Democratic	John Pinto (incumbent)	7,981	79.31%
Republican	Gregory R. Begay	2,082	20.69%
Total votes		10,063	100.0%
Democratic hold			

=== District 4 ===
District 4 election, 1996
Party	Candidate	Votes	%
Democratic	Gloria Howes (incumbent)	6,355	100.0%
Total votes		6,355	100.0%
Democratic hold			

=== District 5 ===
District 5 election, 1996
Party	Candidate	Votes	%
Democratic	Arthur Rodarte	8,581	67.17%
Republican	Howard L. Bancroft III	3,548	27.78%
	Scattering	645	5.05%
Total votes		12,774	100.0%
Democratic hold			

=== District 6 ===
District 6 election, 1996
Party	Candidate	Votes	%
Democratic	Carlos Cisneros (incumbent)	10,677	81.99%
Independent	Daniel J. Pearlman	2,345	18.01%
Total votes		13,022	100.0%
Democratic hold			

=== District 7 ===
District 7 election, 1996
Party	Candidate	Votes	%
Republican	Patrick H. Lyons (incumbent)	8,984	59.81%
Democratic	Warren F. Frost	6,036	40.19%
Total votes		15,020	100.0%
Republican hold			

=== District 8 ===
District 8 election, 1996
Party	Candidate	Votes	%
Democratic	Pete Campos (incumbent)	11,455	100.0%
Total votes		11,455	100.0%
Democratic hold			

=== District 9 ===
District 9 election, 1996
Party	Candidate	Votes	%
Democratic	Pauline Eisenstadt	9,152	51.51%
Republican	Virgil O. Rhodes (incumbent)	8,616	48.49%
Total votes		17,768	100.0%
Democratic gain from Republican			

=== District 10 ===
District 10 election, 1996
Party	Candidate	Votes	%
Republican	Ramsay Gorham	7,692	52.54%
Democratic	Janice D. Paster (incumbent)	6,948	47.46%
Total votes		14,640	100.0%
Republican gain from Democratic			

=== District 11 ===
District 11 election, 1996
Party	Candidate	Votes	%
Democratic	Linda M. Lopez	6,467	100.0%
Total votes		6,467	100.0%
Democratic hold			

=== District 12 ===
District 12 election, 1996
Party	Candidate	Votes	%
Democratic	Richard M. Romero (incumbent)	7,845	100.0%
Total votes		7,845	100.0%
Democratic hold			

=== District 13 ===
District 13 election, 1996
Party	Candidate	Votes	%
Democratic	Dede Feldman	7,897	69.25%
Republican	Bill Turner	3,507	30.75%
Total votes		11,404	100.0%
Democratic hold			

=== District 14 ===
District 14 election, 1996
Party	Candidate	Votes	%
Democratic	Manny Aragon (incumbent)	5,341	100.0%
Total votes		5,341	100.0%
Democratic hold			

=== District 15 ===
District 15 election, 1996
Party	Candidate	Votes	%
Republican	Skip Vernon (incumbent)	8,151	53.41%
Democratic	Karen A. Durkovich	7,111	46.59%
Total votes		15,262	100.0%
Republican hold			

=== District 16 ===
District 16 election, 1996
Party	Candidate	Votes	%
Democratic	Cisco McSorley	8,602	63.70%
Republican	Daniel R. Armstrong	4,901	36.30%
Total votes		13,503	100.0%
Democratic hold			

=== District 17 ===
District 17 election, 1996
Party	Candidate	Votes	%
Democratic	Shannon Robinson (incumbent)	4,633	55.66%
Republican	Daniel Lopez	3,690	44.34%
Total votes		8,323	100.0%
Democratic hold			

=== District 18 ===
District 18 election, 1996
Party	Candidate	Votes	%
Republican	Mark Boitano	8,174	56.05%
Democratic	Ann J. Riley (incumbent)	6,408	43.95%
Total votes		14,582	100.0%
Republican gain from Democratic			

=== District 19 ===
District 19 election, 1996
Party	Candidate	Votes	%
Republican	Sue Wilson Beffort	10,010	67.15%
Democratic	Joshua R. Simms	4,896	32.85%
Total votes		14,906	100.0%
Republican hold			

=== District 20 ===
District 20 election, 1996
Party	Candidate	Votes	%
Republican	William Payne	10,060	65.28%
Democratic	Todd M. Aakhus	5,350	34.72%
Total votes		15,410	100.0%
Republican hold			

=== District 21 ===
District 21 election, 1996
Party	Candidate	Votes	%
Republican	William Davis	10,781	56.40%
Democratic	Anita Miller	8,335	43.60%
Total votes		19,116	100.0%
Republican hold			

=== District 22 ===
District 22 election, 1996
Party	Candidate	Votes	%
Democratic	Leonard Tsosie (incumbent)	8,219	100.0%
Total votes		8,219	100.0%
Democratic hold			

=== District 23 ===
District 23 election, 1996
Party	Candidate	Votes	%
Republican	Joseph Carraro (incumbent)	9,295	61.70%
Democratic	A. Mickey Soto	5,769	38.30%
Total votes		15,064	100.0%
Republican hold			

=== District 24 ===
District 24 election, 1996
Party	Candidate	Votes	%
Democratic	Nancy Rodriguez	10,015	100.0%
Total votes		10,015	100.0%
Democratic hold			

=== District 25 ===
District 25 election, 1996
Party	Candidate	Votes	%
Democratic	Roman Maes (incumbent)	13,332	69.05%
Republican	Jack M. Stamm	5,977	30.95%
Total votes		19,309	100.0%
Democratic hold			

=== District 26 ===
District 26 election, 1996
Party	Candidate	Votes	%
Democratic	Phillip Maloof (incumbent)	7,669	63.99%
Republican	Jerry T. Daniele	4,316	36.01%
Total votes		11,985	100.0%
Democratic hold			

=== District 27 ===
District 27 election, 1996
Party	Candidate	Votes	%
Republican	Stuart Ingle (incumbent)	5,579	60.54%
Democratic	Travis D. Foster	3,637	39.46%
Total votes		9,216	100.0%
Republican hold			

=== District 28 ===
District 28 election, 1996
Party	Candidate	Votes	%
Democratic	Ben D. Altamirano (incumbent)	10,994	100.0%
Total votes		10,994	100.0%
Democratic hold			

=== District 29 ===
District 29 election, 1996
Party	Candidate	Votes	%
Democratic	Michael S. Sanchez (incumbent)	7,702	53.30%
Republican	Irene J. Lee	6,747	46.70%
Total votes		14,449	100.0%
Democratic hold			

=== District 30 ===
District 30 election, 1996
Party	Candidate	Votes	%
Democratic	Joseph Fidel (incumbent)	7,929	62.70%
Republican	Michael W. Zmuda	4,716	37.30%
Total votes		12,645	100.0%
Democratic hold			

=== District 31 ===
District 31 election, 1996
Party	Candidate	Votes	%
Democratic	Cynthia Nava (incumbent)	4,965	58.79%
Republican	Samuel Reyes	3,480	41.21%
Total votes		8,445	100.0%
Democratic hold			

=== District 32 ===
District 32 election, 1996
Party	Candidate	Votes	%
Democratic	Timothy Jennings (incumbent)	5,380	62.48%
Republican	James P. Bignell	3,231	37.52%
Total votes		8,611	100.0%
Democratic hold			

=== District 33 ===
District 33 election, 1996
Party	Candidate	Votes	%
Republican	Rod Adair	10,623	100.0%
Total votes		10,623	100.0%
Republican hold			

=== District 34 ===
District 34 election, 1996
Party	Candidate	Votes	%
Republican	Don Kidd (incumbent)	10,565	100.0%
Total votes		10,565	100.0%
Republican hold			

=== District 35 ===
District 35 election, 1996
Party	Candidate	Votes	%
Democratic	John Arthur Smith (incumbent)	7,370	55.37%
Republican	Nancy C. Stovall	5,940	44.63%
Total votes		13,310	100.0%
Democratic hold			

=== District 36 ===
District 36 election, 1996
Party	Candidate	Votes	%
Democratic	Mary Jane Garcia (incumbent)	6,026	51.50%
Republican	Thomas F. Bulger	5,674	48.50%
Total votes		11,700	100.0%
Democratic hold			

=== District 37 ===
District 37 election, 1996
Party	Candidate	Votes	%
Republican	Leonard Lee Rawson (incumbent)	7,888	63.01%
Democratic	Roger Flemming	4,631	36.99%
Total votes		12,519	100.0%
Republican hold			

=== District 38 ===
District 38 election, 1996
Party	Candidate	Votes	%
Democratic	Fernando Macias (incumbent)	5,297	50.05%
Republican	Marendra N. Gunaji	5,286	49.95%
Total votes		10,583	100.0%
Democratic hold			

=== District 39 ===
District 39 election, 1996
Party	Candidate	Votes	%
Democratic	Phil Griego	8,393	57.47%
Republican	Simon Bickley	6,210	42.53%
Total votes		14,603	100.0%
Democratic hold			

=== District 40 ===
District 40 election, 1996
Party	Candidate	Votes	%
Republican	Dianna Duran (incumbent)	10,661	100.0%
Total votes		10,661	100.0%
Republican hold			

=== District 41 ===
District 41 election, 1996
Party	Candidate	Votes	%
Republican	Carroll Leavell	4,399	51.41%
Democratic	Pat Darcy	4,158	48.59%
Total votes		8,557	100.0%
Republican gain from Democratic			

=== District 42 ===
District 42 election, 1996
Party	Candidate	Votes	%
Republican	Billy McKibben (incumbent)	9,325	100.0%
Total votes		9,325	100.0%
Republican hold			
