= Senator Sanchez =

Senator Sanchez may refer to:

== Chile (Senate of the Republic) ==
- Roberto Sánchez (Chilean politician) (1879–1947)

== Mexico (Senate of the Republic) ==
- Alfonso Sánchez Anaya (1941–2026), senator for Tlaxcala in 2006–2012
- Cecilia Sánchez García (born 1959), senator for Campeche in 2018–2024
- Gerardo Sánchez García (born 1960), senator-at-large in 2012–2018
- Gustavo Sánchez Vásquez (1963–2026), senator for Baja California in 2024–2026
- Luis Sánchez Jiménez (born 1962), senator-at-large in 2012–2018
- Salvador Sánchez Vázquez (1940–2014), senator for Nayarit in 1991–1997

== Peru (Senate of the Republic) ==
- Luis Alberto Sánchez (1900–1994), senator for Lima in 1963–1968 and 1980–1992

== United States and territories ==
- Bernadette Sanchez (born 1953), New Mexico State Senate
- Clemente Sanchez (politician) (born 1958), New Mexico State Senate
- Michael S. Sanchez (born 1950), New Mexico State Senate
- Pedro C. Sanchez (1925–1987), Legislature of Guam

== Uruguay (Chamber of Senators) ==
- Alejandro Sánchez Pereira (born 1980)
