= Rainaldi =

Rainaldi is an Italian surname. Notable people with the surname include:

- Carlo Rainaldi (1611–1691), Italian Baroque architect
- Domenico Rainaldi, Italian Baroque painter
- Girolamo Rainaldi (1570–1655), Italian architect
- Lidio Rainaldi (1929–2019), American politician
