= Senator Adair (disambiguation) =

John Adair (1757–1840) is a U.S. Senator from Kentucky from 1805 to 1806.

Senator Adair may also refer to:

- J. Leroy Adair (1887–1956), Illinois State Senate
- Rod Adair (born 1953), New Mexico State Senate
