= Senator Kidd =

Senator Kidd may refer to:

- Chris Kidd (born 1979), Oklahoma State Senate
- Culver Kidd Jr. (1914–1995), Georgia State Senate
- Don Kidd (1937–2020), New Mexico State Senate
- Edward I. Kidd (1845–1902), Wisconsin State Senate
- Robert F. Kidd (1853–1930), West Virginia State Senate
