= Senator Neville =

Senator Neville may refer to:

- Steven Neville (born 1950), New Mexico State Senate
- Tim Neville, Colorado State Senate

== See also ==
- Thomas M. Neuville (born 1950), Minnesota State Senate
