= Senator Feldman =

Senator Feldman may refer to:

- Brian Feldman (politician) (born 1961), Maryland State Senate
- Dede Feldman (born 1947), New Mexico State Senate
- Matthew Feldman (1919–1994), New Jersey State Senate
