= Senator Fulfer =

Senator Fulfer may refer to:

- Colby Fulfer (fl. 2020s), Arkansas State Senate
- Gregg Fulfer (fl. 2010s–2020s), New Mexico State Senate
