= John Wirth (historian) =

American historian

- Born: John Davis Wirth; 1936; Dawson, New Mexico, U.S.
- Died: June 20, 2002 (aged 66); Toronto, Ontario, Canada
- Children: 3, including Peter
- Relatives: Tim Wirth (brother)

Academic background
- Education: Harvard University (BA); Stanford University (PhD)
- Thesis: Brazilian Economic Nationalism: Trade and Steel Under Vargas

Academic work
- Discipline: History
- Sub-discipline: Latin American studies Urbanization; New Mexico history

John Davis Wirth (1936 – June 20, 2002) was an American historian and academic who was the Gildred Professor of Latin American Studies at Stanford University. A specialist in economic history, he studied developmentalism, international trade, and the creation of the steel and petroleum industries. A deepening interest in environmentalism led to his appointment in 1994 by President Bill Clinton as one of the five members of the Joint Public Advisory Committee of the North American Commission for Environmental Cooperation.

== Early life and education ==
Wirth was born in Dawson, New Mexico. He attended high school in Denver before graduating from The Putney School in Vermont. He earned a bachelor's degree from Harvard College in 1958 and a doctorate in Latin American history in 1967 from Stanford University. His dissertation was titled "Brazilian Economic Nationalism: Trade and Steel Under Vargas." His first book, The Politics of Brazilian Development, 1930–1954, won the Bolton Prize in 1971 and his second, Minas Gerais in the Brazilian Federation, 1889–1937, won an honorable mention in 1978.

== Career ==
Wirth's included examinations of Inca and Aztec states, urban growth in Manchester and São Paulo, and Pan-American environmental politics. Wirth, who had retired from Stanford prior to his death, had most recently turned his attention to the complex relationships between Canada, the United States and Mexico. He co-founded the North American Institute in Santa Fe and served as its president.

His last book, published by the University of New Mexico Press, tells the story of the Los Alamos Ranch School, which was displaced during World War II during the development of the Manhattan Project.

== Personal life ==
Wirth was married to Nancy Meem Wirth, daughter of John Gaw Meem. Together they had three sons: Peter, Nicholas and Timothy. Peter was elected to the New Mexico Legislature in 2004. Wirth's brother, Tim, is a former congressman and senator.

He died on June 20, 2002, in Toronto, Ontario, Canada, from a heart aneurysm while delivering a lecture to the Friends of Fort York, a Canadian historical society. Upon his death, Wirth's complete papers were donated to the Stanford University Archives.

== Books ==
- Environmental management on North America's borders (co-edited with Richard Kiy). College Station, Tex.: Texas A & M University Press, 1998.
- The politics of Brazilian development 1930-1954. Stanford, Calif.: Stanford University Press, 1970
- Minas and the Nation: a study of regional power and dependency, 1889-1937. Stony Brook, N.Y. : State University of New York, 1974
- Minas Gerais in the Brazilian Federation, 1889-1937. Stanford, Calif.: Stanford University Press, 1977
- Manchester and São Paulo: problems of rapid urban growth (Co-authored with Robert L. Jones). Stanford, Calif.: Stanford University Press, 1978
- The oil business in Latin America: the early years. Washington, D.C.: Beard Books, 2001, 1985
- Latin American oil companies and the politics of energy. Lincoln: University of Nebraska Press, 1985
- State and society in Brazil: continuity and change (co-authored with Edson de Oliveira Nunes). Boulder: Westview Press, 1987
- The media, NAFTA, and the shaping of the North American community. Santa Fe, N.M.: North American Institute, 1994
- Identities in North America: the search for community (co-authored with Robert Earle). Stanford, Calif.: Stanford University Press, 1995
- Smelter smoke in North America: the politics of transborder pollution. Lawrence, Kan.: University Press of Kansas, 2000
- Los Alamos: the Ranch School years, 1917-1943 (co-authored with Linda Aldrich) Albuquerque: University of New Mexico Press, 2003
