= Steve D. Lanier =

American politician

Steve Lanier

Member of the New Mexico Senate from the 2nd district
- Incumbent
- Assumed office January 2025
- Preceded by: Steven Neville

Personal details
- Born: 1966 (age 59–60) Aztec, New Mexico, U.S.
- Party: Republican
- Education: Western New Mexico University (BA)

Steve D. Lanier (born 1966) is an American politician serving as a Republican member of the New Mexico Senate for the 2nd district, which covers the north-eastern section of San Juan County, including many towns northeast of Farmington, New Mexico.

== Early life and education ==
Born in 1966 in Aztec, New Mexico, Lanier was raised on a farm in Cedar Hill. He played football and ran track at Aztec High School. Lanier graduated from Western New Mexico University.

== Career ==
Lanier worked as a history and computer science teacher at Aztec High School for 28 years. He assumed his position at the start of the 2025 legislative session, succeeding Steven Neville.

Lanier serves on the Senate Finance committee. He has sponsored bills such as SB 18, which would make swatting a fourth degree felony in New Mexico, and HB 170, which would alter the state's current voter ID requirements. In the 2025 legislative session, Lanier was part of the 8-3 vote in the New Mexico Senate Finance Committee that tabled the Paid Family & Medical Leave Act.

Lanier announced his candidacy for governor of New Mexico on November 6, 2025, but had to withdraw from the race on March 27 of the following year due to a paperwork filing error.
