= Candace Gould =

American politician

Member of the New Mexico Senate from the 10th district
- In office 2017–2021
- Preceded by: John Ryan
- Succeeded by: Katy Duhigg

Personal details
- Party: Republican

Candace Gould is an American politician and businesswoman who served as a member of the New Mexico Senate from 2017 to 2021. Gould represented the 10th district, which includes portions of Bernalillo and Sandoval County, New Mexico.

== Background ==
The daughter of a military family, Gould moved to New Mexico as a child. She has operated a small business for 15 years and worked the executive director of the Heart Gallery of New Mexico Foundation, a non-profit organization that supports foster children. A Republican, Gould was elected to the New Mexico Senate in 2016. She took office in 2017, succeeding John Ryan.

In the November 2020 general election, Gould was defeated by Democratic nominee Katy Duhigg.
