= Tito D. Chavez =

American politician

Member of the New Mexico Senate from the 13th district
- In office 1977–1996

Personal details
- Born: July 31, 1947 (age 79) Albuquerque, New Mexico, U.S.
- Party: Democratic
- Spouse: Beatrice
- Education: University of New Mexico; University of Arizona

Tito D. Chavez (born July 31, 1947) is an American politician. He served as a Democratic member for the 13th district of the New Mexico Senate.

== Life and career ==
Chavez was born in Albuquerque, New Mexico. He attended the University of New Mexico and the University of Arizona.

Chavez was a lawyer.

Chavez served in the New Mexico Senate from 1977 to 1996, representing the 13th district.
