= Gregg Fulfer =

American politician and businessman

Member of the New Mexico State Game Commission
- Incumbent
- Assumed office June 2022
- Appointed by: Michelle Lujan Grisham

Member of the New Mexico Senate from the 41st district
- In office December 26, 2018 – January 19, 2021
- Preceded by: Carroll Leavell
- Succeeded by: David Gallegos

Personal details
- Party: Republican
- Spouse: Kim
- Children: 2
- Education: New Mexico State University (BS)

Gregg Fulfer is an American politician and businessman who served as a member of the New Mexico Senate from 2018 to 2021. Fulfer represented Eddy and Lea counties.

== Early life and education ==
Fulfer is a native of Jal, New Mexico. He earned a Bachelor of Science degree in electrical engineering from New Mexico State University.

== Career ==
Prior to entering politics, Fulfer operated Fulfer Oil and Cattle Co. for 36 years. He also operated Fulfer Electric before selling the company in 2006. Fulfer served on the Lea County Commission and New Mexico Environmental Improvement Board. He later served on the New Mexico Economic Development Board. Fulfer assumed office on December 26, 2018. He was defeated for re-election in the June 2020 Republican primary by David Gallegos.

In July 2022, Fulfer was appointed to serve as a member of the New Mexico State Game Commission by Governor Michelle Lujan Grisham.

== Personal life ==
Fulfer and his wife, Kim, have two adult children.
