= Peter Wirth (politician) =

American politician

Majority Leader of the New Mexico Senate
- Incumbent
- Assumed office January 17, 2017
- Preceded by: Michael S. Sanchez

Member of the New Mexico Senate from the 25th district
- Incumbent
- Assumed office January 2009
- Preceded by: John Grubesic

Member of the New Mexico House of Representatives from the 47th district
- In office January 2005 – January 2009
- Preceded by: Max Coll
- Succeeded by: Brian Egolf

Personal details
- Born: December 3, 1961 (age 64) Stanford, California, U.S.
- Party: Democratic
- Spouse: Carol Romero
- Relations: John Wirth (father); Tim Wirth (uncle)
- Children: 2
- Education: Stanford University (BA); University of New Mexico (JD)
- Website: Official website

Peter Wirth (born December 3, 1961) is an American attorney and politician serving as a member of the New Mexico Senate, first elected in 2009. He previously served in the New Mexico House of Representatives from 2005 to 2009.

== Early life and education ==
Wirth was born in Stanford, California, the eldest son of John Wirth, a historian and professor of Latin American studies. Wirth's uncle, Tim Wirth, served as a member of the United States Senate from Colorado. Wirth graduated from Stanford University in 1984 with a Bachelor of Arts degree in economics and Spanish. He earned his Juris Doctor from the University of New Mexico School of Law in 1990.

== Career ==
Wirth works as an attorney and professional mediator.

=== New Mexico Senate ===
On November 19, 2016 Wirth was elected as the Democratic Leader by Senate Democratic Caucus and therefore Senate Majority Leader in the New Mexico State Senate for the 53rd Legislature. He previously served as the Chair of the Senate Conservation Committee from 2013 to 2016, Vice-Chairman of the Senate Judiciary Committee from 2011 to 2012, and Vice-Chairman of the Senate Rules Committee from 2011-2012.

Wirth has repeatedly introduced a bill to lower the corporate tax rate but raise revenue by closing loopholes.

New Mexico Senate
Preceded by Michael S. Sanchez	Majority Leader of the New Mexico Senate; 2017–present	Incumbent
