= Vernon Asbill =

American politician

Member of the New Mexico Senate from the 34th district
- In office 2005–2013
- Preceded by: Don Kidd
- Succeeded by: Ron Griggs

Personal details
- Born: Vernon David Asbill; April 11, 1945 (age 81) San Angelo, Texas, U.S.
- Party: Republican
- Education: McMurry College (BA); Western New Mexico University (MBA)

Vernon D. Asbill (born April 11, 1945) is an American politician and educator who served as a member of the New Mexico Senate for the 34th district from 2005 to 2013.

== Early life and education ==
Asbill was born in San Angelo, Texas, and raised in Sterling City, Texas. He earned a Bachelor of Arts degree in education from McMurry College and a Master of Business Administration with an emphasis in education administration from Western New Mexico University.

== Career ==
Asbill worked as a teacher at Artesia High School from 1970 to 1979 and assistant principal of the school from 1979 to 1984. From 1984 to 1988, he was principal of Zia Intermediate School. He was superintendent of the Cloudcroft Municipal Schools from 1984 to 1992 and superintendent of the Carlsbad Municipal School District from 1992 to 2003. Asbill was elected to the New Mexico Senate in 2004 and assumed office in 2005. He served until 2013. During his final term in the Senate, he served as ranking member of the Senate Education Committee.
