= John Grubesic =

American politician (born 1965)

Member of the New Mexico Senate from the 25th district
- In office 2004–2008
- Preceded by: Roman Maes
- Succeeded by: Peter Wirth

Personal details
- Born: June 30, 1965 (age 61) New Mexico, U.S.
- Party: Democratic
- Spouse: Dana
- Education: Fort Lewis College, Sturm College of Law
- Occupation: attorney

John Grubesic (born June 30, 1965) is an American politician and attorney who served as a member of the New Mexico Senate, representing the 25th District as a Democrat.
