= Mary Kay Papen =

American politician (born 1932)

President pro tempore of the New Mexico Senate
- In office January 15, 2013 – January 19, 2021
- Preceded by: Timothy Jennings
- Succeeded by: Mimi Stewart

Member of the New Mexico Senate from the 38th district
- In office January 2001 – January 19, 2021
- Preceded by: Fernando Macias
- Succeeded by: Carrie Hamblen

Personal details
- Born: March 19, 1932 (age 94) El Paso, Texas, U.S.
- Party: Democratic
- Education: New Mexico State University (BA)
- Website: State Senate website

Mary Kuper "Kay" Papen (born March 19, 1932) is an American politician who served as a member of the New Mexico Senate from January 2001 to January 2021.

== Career ==
Papen was first elected to the New Mexico State Senate in 2000, joining 10 other women in the senate. She was one of three women elected to the state senate that year. Papen held her Doña Ana County senate seat for 20 years before losing reelection in 2020.

From 2013 to 2021, Papen served as president pro tempore of the New Mexico Senate and led a coalition of Republicans and conservative Democrats, despite the body's 26–16 Democratic majority.

During her time in office, Papen faced criticism for blocking legislation that would allow voters to consider an amendment that would fund early childhood programs using 1% more yearly from the state's $18 million Land Grant Permanent Fund.

In the 2020 election, Papen faced a primary challenge from Carrie Hamblen, then president of the Las Cruces Green Chamber of Commerce. In the June 2, 2020 Democratic primary, Hamblen defeated Papen.

New Mexico Senate
Preceded by Timothy Jennings	President pro tempore of the New Mexico Senate; 2013–2021	Succeeded by Mimi Stewart
