= Gay Kernan =

American politician

Member of the New Mexico Senate from the 42nd district
- In office 2002 – August 1, 2023
- Preceded by: Shirley Bailey
- Succeeded by: Steven McCutcheon II

Personal details
- Born: 1947 (age 78–79) Oklahoma City, Oklahoma
- Party: Republican
- Education: University of Mississippi (BA)

Gay G. Kernan (born 1947 in Oklahoma City, Oklahoma) is an American politician and a former Republican member of the New Mexico Senate representing District 42 beginning with her 2002 appointment by Governor of New Mexico Gary Johnson to fill the vacancy caused by the resignation of Senator Shirley Bailey.

On July 3, 2023, Kernan revealed that she would step down from the Senate effective August 1 due to health reasons.

== Education ==
Kernan earned her BA from University of Mississippi.

== Elections ==
- 2012 Kernan was unopposed for both the June 5, 2012 Republican Primary, winning with 2,907 votes and the November 6, 2012 General election, winning with 14,414 votes.
- 2004 Kernan was challenged in the June 1, 2004 Republican Primary, winning with 1,639 votes (60.1%) and was unopposed for the November 2, 2004 General election, winning with 12,881 votes.
- 2008 Kernan was unopposed for both the June 8, 2008 Republican Primary, winning with 3,334 votes and the November 4, 2008 General election, winning with 12,519 votes.
