= John Ryan (New Mexico politician) =

American politician (21st century)

Member of the New Mexico Senate from the 10th district
- In office January 2005 – January 2016
- Preceded by: Ramsay Gorham
- Succeeded by: Candace Gould

Personal details
- Born: John Christopher Ryan
- Party: Republican

John Christopher Ryan is an American politician who served as a member of the New Mexico Senate for the 10th district from January 2005 to January 2016. Ryan opted not to seek re-election in 2016 and was succeeded by Candace Gould.

== Elections ==
- 2012 Ryan was unopposed for the June 5, 2012 Republican Primary, winning with 1,872 votes and won the November 6, 2012 General election with 10,063 votes (54.3%) against former Independent Senator Joseph Carraro, who had previously served District 23.
- 2004 When District 10 Republican Senator Ramsay Gorham retired and left the seat open, Ryan was unopposed for the June 1, 2004 Republican Primary, winning with 1,207 votes and won the November 2, 2004 General election with 12,651 votes (54.3%) against Democratic nominee John Hooker.
- 2008 Ryan was challenged in the June 8, 2008 Republican Primary, winning with 2,672 votes (65.1%) and won the November 4, 2008 General election with 13,776 votes (51.2%) against Democratic nominee Victor Raigoza, who had run in 2004 but lost the 2004 Democratic Primary to Hooker.
