= Phillip Maloof =

American businessman and politician (born 1967)

Philip Maloof

Member of the New Mexico Senate from the 26th district
- In office January 18, 1994 – January 16, 2001
- Preceded by: Martin Chávez
- Succeeded by: Bernadette Sanchez

Personal details
- Born: May 16, 1967 (age 59)
- Party: Democratic
- Education: University of New Mexico (B.A.)

Phillip J. Maloof (born May 16, 1967) is an American businessman and politician who served as a Democratic member of the New Mexico Senate from 1994 to 2001.

== Early life ==
Phillip J. Maloof was born May 16, 1967, and is the son of George Maloof, a prominent businessman. He graduated from the University of New Mexico in 1996 with his bachelor's degree in university studies. After graduating, he worked in his family's business.

== New Mexico Senate ==
In 1993, after State Senator Martin Chávez was elected mayor of Albuquerque, the Bernalillo County Commission appointed Maloof to serve out the remaining year of Chávez's term. Maloof was sworn in on January 18, 1994. He was re-elected in 1996 over Republican nominee Jerry Daniele, a general contractor, with 64 percent of the vote. In 2000, Maloof declined to seek another term, citing his need to return to his family's business.

== 1998 congressional campaigns ==
Following the death of Republican Congressman Steve Schiff on March 25, 1998, Maloof ran in the special election to succeed him in the 1st district. He was nominated by the Democratic Party at a nominating convention, and also ran in the regular election. In the Democratic primary for the full term, Maloof faced retired U.S. Air Force Colonel Gary Van Valin. He won the June 2 primary election in a landslide, receiving 75 percent of the vote to Van Valin's 25 percent.

In the general election, he was challenged by Republican Heather Wilson, a former cabinet official in Governor Gary Johnson's administration; Green Party nominee Robert Anderson, a professor at the University of New Mexico; and Libertarian Bruce Bush. Maloof campaigned on his "anti-crime and anti-tax credentials," pointing to his push for a "three strikes" law in the state, and relied on his personal wealth to out-spend Wilson. However, Maloof narrowly lost to Wilson, receiving 39 percent of the vote to her 44 percent, while Anderson won 14 percent. Maloof faced Wilson and Anderson again in the general election, and lost by a similar margin, receiving 42 percent of the vote to Wilson's 48 pecent and Anderson's 10 percent.
