= Pauline Eisenstadt =

American politician (1939–2024)

Member of the New Mexico House of Representatives for District 44
- In office 1985–1993

Member of the New Mexico Senate for District 9
- In office 1997–2000
- Succeeded by: Steve Komadina

Personal details
- Born: 31 December 1939 New York City
- Died: 1 March 2024 (aged 84) New Mexico
- Party: Democratic
- Spouse: Mel Eisenstadt (d. 2019)
- Education: University of Florida; University of Arizona

Pauline Doreen Bauman Eisenstadt (December 31, 1939 – March 1, 2024) was an American politician. She was the first woman to serve in both houses of the New Mexico Legislature.

== Early life ==
Eisenstadt was born in New York City and raised in Miami. Eisenstadt was a descendant of Holocaust survivors who had fled Poland in the 1930s. She received a bachelor's degree from the University of Florida in 1960 and a master's degree at the University of Arizona in 1964.

== Career ==
In New Mexico, Eisenstadt helped start a consumer group called Energy Consumers of New Mexico in 1977. Eisenstadt was the first woman to serve her Rio Rancho constituency in both houses of the New Mexico Legislature. Eisenstadt was in the New Mexico House of Representatives representing District 44 (1985–1993) and in the New Mexico Senate representing District 9 (1997–2000).

Eisenstadt advocated to improve prenatal care especially for Native Americans.

== Death ==
Eisenstadt died on March 1, 2024, at the age of 84. She is survived by her two sons.
