= Steven Neville =

American politician

Member of the New Mexico Senate from the 2nd district
- In office January 2005 – December 31, 2024
- Preceded by: Raymond Kysar
- Succeeded by: Steve D. Lanier

Personal details
- Born: June 30, 1950 (age 76) Santa Fe, New Mexico
- Party: Republican
- Education: New Mexico State University
- Website: spneville.com

Steven P. Neville (born June 30, 1950 in Santa Fe, New Mexico) is an American politician who served as a Republican member of the New Mexico Senate from 2005 to 2025. Neville announced his retirement in February 2024, and did not run for re-election for the legislature. Neville's successor as the senator for District 2 was Republican Steve D. Lanier, effective at the start of the 2025 legislative session.

== Education ==
Neville earned his BS in agronomy and genetics, and his MS in agricultural economics and animal science from New Mexico State University.

== Elections ==
- 2012: Neville was unopposed for both the June 5, 2012 Republican Primary, winning with 2,988 votes and the November 6, 2012 General election, winning with 14,168 votes.
- 2008: Neville was unopposed for both the June 8, 2008 Republican Primary, winning with 2,857 votes and the November 4, 2008 General election, winning with 14,223 votes.
- 2004: When District 2 Republican Senator Raymond Kysar left the Legislature and left the seat open, Neville was unopposed for both the June 1, 2004 Republican Primary, winning with 1,878 votes and the November 2, 2004 General election, winning with 14,084 votes.
