= Richard M. Romero =

American politician

Richard Romero

Member of the New Mexico Senate
- In office 1992–2004

Superintendent of Albuquerque Public Schools
- In office 1985–1987

Personal details
- Born: July 21, 1944 (age 82) Oakland, California, U.S.
- Party: Democratic
- Education: University of Albuquerque (BA); New Mexico State University (MA)

Military service
- Branch/service: United States Air Force

Richard M. Romero (born July 21, 1944) is an American educator and politician who served as a member of the New Mexico Senate from 1992 to 2004.

== Early life and education ==
Born in Oakland, California, Romero received in bachelor's degree from the University of Albuquerque and his master's degree from New Mexico State University.

== Career ==
After serving in the United States Air Force, Romero was a high school principal and financial planner in Albuquerque, New Mexico. From 1985 to 1987, Romero was superintendent of Albuquerque Public Schools. From 1992 to 2004, Romero served in the New Mexico State Senate as a Democrat. Romero served as president pro tempore of the New Mexico Senate in 2001.
