= Richard Martinez (politician) =

American politician, attorney, and judge

Member of the New Mexico Senate from the 5th district
- In office 2001 – January 19, 2021
- Succeeded by: Leo Jaramillo

Personal details
- Born: March 7, 1953 (age 73) Española, New Mexico, U.S.
- Party: Democratic
- Occupation: Retired magistrate judge

Richard C. Martinez (born March 7, 1953) is an American politician, attorney, and retired judge who served as a member of the New Mexico Senate from 2001 to 2021.

In the 2020 Democratic primary, Martinez was defeated by Rio Arriba County Commissioner Leo Jaramillo, who was supported by progressives and criticized Martinez for his moderate voting record.
