= Roman Maes =

American attorney

Member of the New Mexico Senate from the 25th district
- In office 1985–2004
- Succeeded by: John Grubesic

Personal details
- Born: Roman M. Maes III; 1941 (age 84–85) Santa Fe, New Mexico, U.S.
- Party: Democratic
- Education: New Mexico Highlands University (BA); University of Denver (JD)

Roman M. Maes III (born 1941) is an American attorney, politician, and lobbyist who served as a member of the New Mexico Senate from 1985 to 2004.

== Early life and education ==
Maes was born and raised in Santa Fe, New Mexico. He earned a Bachelor of Arts degree from New Mexico Highlands University and a Juris Doctor from the Sturm College of Law at the University of Denver.

== Career ==
A member of the Democratic Party, Maes was elected in 1984 and assumed office in 1985. During his tenure in the Senate, Maes became a close ally of Governor Bill Richardson. In 2004, Maes was defeated for re-election by in the Democratic primary by John Grubesic. After his primary defeat, Maes resigned from the Senate.

After resigning from the Senate, Maes registered as a lobbyist, where he his clients included Microsoft, Picuris Pueblo, the New Mexico Investment Council, Qwest Corporation, and the CHRISTUS St. Vincent Regional Medical Center. In 2008, Maes was appointed to the New Mexico State Transportation Commission by Governor Bill Richardson.
