= Kent Cravens =

American politician

Member of the New Mexico Senate from the 21st district
- In office January 2001 – September 29, 2011
- Succeeded by: Lisa Curtis

Personal details
- Born: January 25, 1960 (age 66) Albuquerque, New Mexico, U.S.
- Party: Republican
- Children: 3

Kent L. Cravens (born January 25, 1960) is an American politician and businessman who served as a member of the New Mexico Senate from January 2001 to September 29, 2011.

== Early life and education ==
Cravens was born and raised in Albuquerque, New Mexico. He attended the New Mexico Military Institute for two years before graduating from Manzano High School in 1978.

== Career ==
From 1989 to 1997, Cravens owned Premier Foods Incorporated. After his sister-in-law was killed in a drunk driving incident in 1992, Cravens began lobbying the New Mexico Legislature to enact stricter DWI laws. In 1999, he founded Alphagraphics Print Shop. He has also worked in the real estate industry.

In 1998, Cravens became the vice chair of the Bernalillo County, New Mexico Republican Party. Cravens was elected to the New Mexico Senate in November 2000 and assumed office in January 2001. Cravens represented the 21st district for 10 years, later serving as the ranking member of the Senate Rules Committee. Cravens resigned from his seat on September 29, 2011, and took a job with the New Mexico Oil and Gas Association as director of governmental affairs. In 2016, Cravens became the CEO of the Greater Albuquerque Association of Realtors.

== Personal life ==
Cravens and his wife, Melanie, have two daughters and one son.
