= H. Diane Snyder =

American politician

Member of the New Mexico Senate from the 15th district
- In office January 2001 – January 2009
- Succeeded by: Tim Eichenberg

Personal details
- Party: Republican

H. Diane Snyder is a former a Republican member of the New Mexico Senate, serving District 15 in Albuquerque. She was first elected in 2000 and re-elected in 2004, but lost her seat in 2008.
