= Cynthia Nava =

American politician

Member of the New Mexico Senate from the 31st district
- In office 1992–2012

Personal details
- Born: June 23, 1952 (age 74) Doña Ana, New Mexico
- Party: Democratic
- Spouse: Divorced
- Education: Western Illinois University (BS); Eastern Illinois University (MA)
- Profession: Educator

Cynthia L. Nava (born June 23, 1952) is an American former politician who was a Democratic member of the New Mexico Senate. She represented the 31st District from 1992 to 2012.
