= Joseph Carraro =

American politician

Member of the New Mexico Senate from the 23rd district
- In office 1993–2009

Member of the New Mexico Senate from the 26th district
- In office 1985–1989

Personal details
- Born: New York City, New York, US
- Party: Independent (from 2008)
- Education: University of New Mexico (BA (Political Science, English), MBA); University of New Mexico

Joseph J. Carraro is an American politician. He represented District 26 in the New Mexico State Senate from 1985 to 1989. After the 1990 redistricting of the New Mexico Legislature, his neighborhood was in another district. He was elected to represent the 23rd district in 1993, and served in that capacity until 2009. He was formerly a member of the Republican party until he became an independent in 2008.

== Early life and education ==
Carraro was born in New York City, New York State, in 1944. He attended the University of New Mexico, where he received a Bachelor of Arts degree and an MBA.

He worked as a financial analyst and stock broker at Merrill Lynch from 1970 to 1974.

== Career ==
Carraro ran for the Republican nomination for the 2006 United States Senate election in New Mexico. He came in 2nd place with 31% of the vote.

In 2012, Carraro used the slogan "The Average Joe" in an unsuccessful campaign against John Ryan in a bid for a New Mexico Senate seat.
