= Phil Griego =

American politician (1948–2026)

Member of the New Mexico Senate from the 39th district
- In office 1997 – March 2015
- Preceded by: Liz Stefanics
- Succeeded by: Ted Barela

Personal details
- Born: August 5, 1948
- Died: January 2026 (aged 77)
- Party: Democratic
- Education: College of Santa Fe, School of Law
- Profession: CEO American Surety Title, rancher

Phil A. Griego (August 5, 1948 – January 2026) was an American Democratic politician who served as a member of the New Mexico Senate, representing the 39th District from 1997 until his resignation in March 2015.

Griego was convicted of corruption in 2017. Griego's death at the age of 77 was announced in the New Mexico Senate on January 23, 2026.
