= William Payne (New Mexico politician) =

American politician from New Mexico (born 1951)

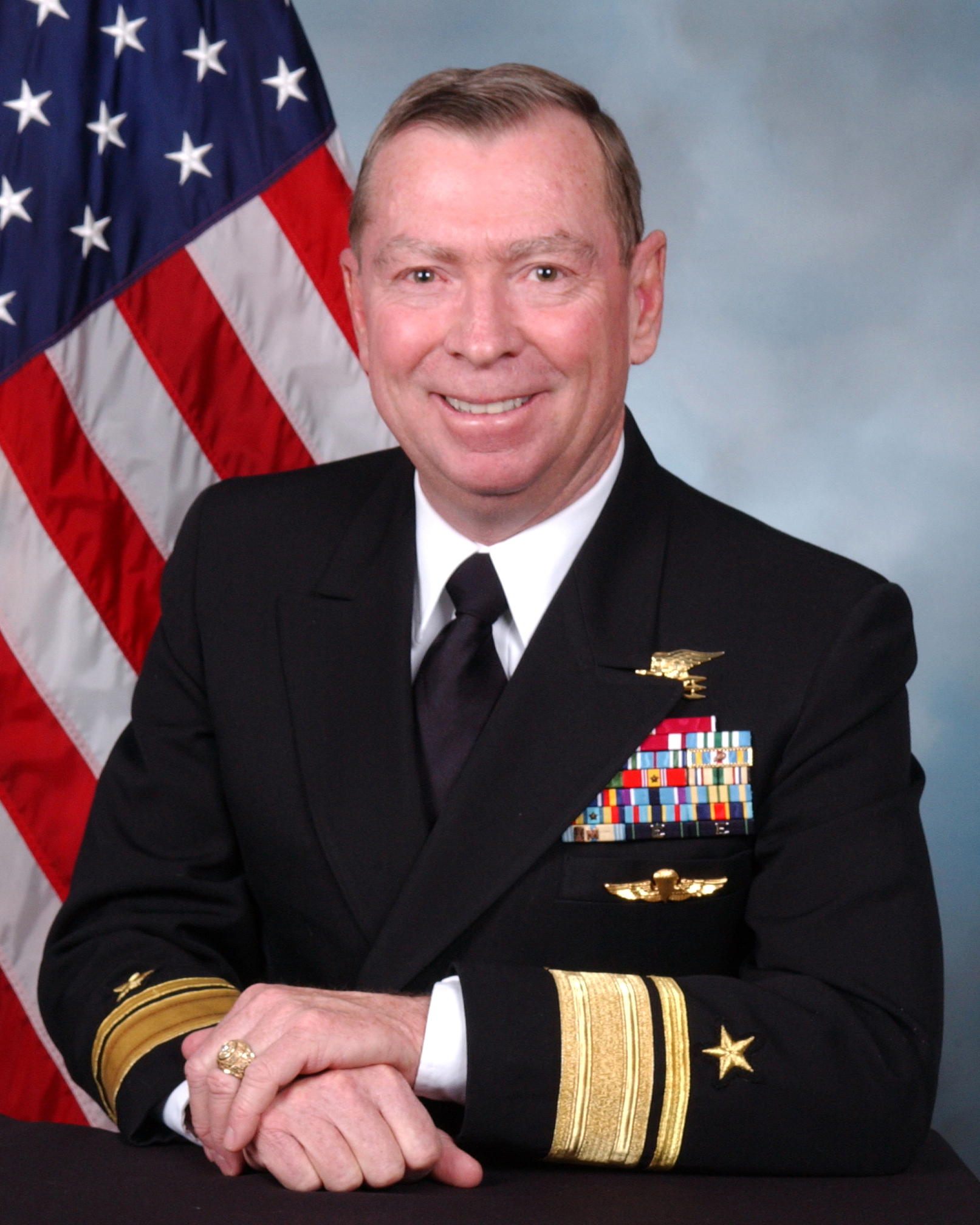

Member of the New Mexico Senate from the 20th district
- In office 1997–2021
- Preceded by: Michael C. Wiener
- Succeeded by: Martin Hickey

Personal details
- Born: William Holland Payne; July 18, 1951 (age 75) Albuquerque, New Mexico, U.S.
- Party: Republican
- Spouse: Deborah
- Education: University of New Mexico (BA, JD); Georgetown University (MA)

Military service
- Branch/service: United States Navy
- Years of service: 1975–2009
- Rank: Rear Admiral

For the American university president, see William H. Payne.

William Holland Payne (born July 18, 1951) is an American politician, attorney, and retired United States Navy Rear admiral.He served as a member of the New Mexico Senate from 1997 to 2021.

== Early life and education ==
Payne was born in Albuquerque, New Mexico. He earned a Bachelor of Arts and Juris Doctor from the University of New Mexico and a Master of Arts from Georgetown University.

== Career ==
=== Military service ===
Upon commissioning as an ensign in February 1976, he reported to Basic Underwater Demolition/SEAL (BUD/S) training in Coronado, California. After six months of training, Payne graduated with BUD/S class 89. Following completion of six month probationary period, he received the 1130 designator as a naval special warfare officer, entitled to wear the Special Warfare insignia. He served with Underwater Demolition Team 11 and SEAL Team One. His last active duty assignment was as operations officer for Naval Special Warfare Unit 1, Subic Bay, Republic of the Philippines. Payne eventually rose to the rank of rear admiral while in the United States Navy Reserve.

=== Politics and government ===
Elected to the New Mexico Senate in 1997, Payne also served as the Republican whip. Payne was a member of the American Legislative Exchange Council and served as New Mexico state leader in 2012.

In 2020, Payne announced that he would not be a candidate for re-election. He was succeeded by Democrat Martin Hickey.

In 2021, Governor Michelle Lujan Grisham appointed Payne to the University of New Mexico Board of Regents.
