= Cisco McSorley =

American politician

- McSorley in 2014

Member of the New Mexico Senate from the 16th district
- In office 1997 – January 8, 2019
- Succeeded by: Antoinette Sedillo Lopez

Member of the New Mexico House of Representatives
- In office 1984–1996

Personal details
- Born: July 8, 1950 (age 76) Albuquerque, New Mexico, U.S.
- Party: Democratic
- Spouse: Joanne Kuestner
- Education: University of New Mexico (BA, JD)

Cisco A. McSorley (born July 8, 1950) is an American attorney and politician who served as a member of the New Mexico Senate for the 16th district from 1997 to 2019. He was previously member of the New Mexico House of Representatives from 1984 to 1996.

== Education ==
McSorley was born and raised in Albuquerque, New Mexico and attended St. Pius X High School. He graduated from the University of New Mexico with a bachelor's degree in 1974 and from the University of New Mexico School of Law with a Juris Doctor in 1979.

== Career ==
After earning his bachelor's degree, McSorley worked as a teacher in Quito, Ecuador. He has practiced law since 1979. McSorley was elected to the New Mexico House of Representatives in 1984, serving until 1996. He was then elected to the New Mexico Senate, serving until his resignation in 2019. He was succeeded by former congressional candidate Antoinette Sedillo Lopez. After his resignation, McSorley was appointed by Governor Michelle Lujan Grisham to serve as the director of the New Mexico Corrections Department's Probation and Parole Division.
