= Joseph Fidel =

American politician

Joseph A. Fidel

Member of the New Mexico Senate from the 30th district
- In office 1973–2006

Personal details
- Born: October 14, 1923 Bibo, New Mexico, U.S.
- Died: May 13, 2015 (aged 91) Grants, New Mexico, U.S.
- Party: Democratic

Joseph A. Fidel (October 14, 1923 – May 13, 2015) was an American politician and businessman who served as a member of the New Mexico State Senate from 1973 to 2006.

== Early life ==
Fidel was born in Bibo, New Mexico, the son of a Lebanese immigrant, Abdoo Habeeb Fadel (later Anglicized as A.H. Fidel).

== Career ==
Fidel was the owner of a realty company. In 2009, the Cibola Beacon named Fidel as Person of the Decade. Fidel served as assessor of Valencia County, New Mexico. He also served on the Grants, New Mexico city council and the school board. Fidel served as a member of the New Mexico Senate from 1973 to 2006.

== Death ==
Fidel died in Grants, New Mexico at the age of 91.
