= Raymond Kysar =

American politician

Member of the New Mexico Senate for the 2nd district
- In office 1989–2005

Personal details
- Born: February 15, 1931 (age 95) Hays, Kansas, United States
- Party: Republican
- Spouse: Patsy Sue Smoot
- Profession: construction, insurance, ranching, real estate

Raymond Lynn Kysar, Jr. (born February 15, 1931) was an American politician who was a Republican member of the New Mexico State Senate from 1989 to 2005. He attended New Mexico State University and worked in the construction, insurance, ranching, and real estate industries. He was inducted into the New Mexico State University College of Business Hall of Fame in 1999.
