= Leonard Tsosie =

American politician

Member of the New Mexico Senate from the 22nd district
- In office January 1, 1993 – January 22, 2007
- Preceded by: James Caudell
- Succeeded by: Lynda Lovejoy

Personal details
- Born: August 19, 1955 (age 70)
- Party: Democratic

Leonard Tsosie (born August 19, 1955) is an American politician who served in the New Mexico Senate from the 22nd district from 1993 to 2007.
