= John Pinto (politician) =

Navajo educator and politician (1924–2019)

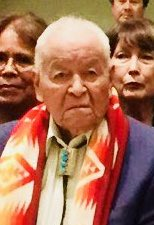

Member of the New Mexico Senate from the 3rd district
- In office 1977 – May 24, 2019
- Succeeded by: Shannon Pinto

Personal details
- Born: December 15, 1924 Lupton, Arizona, U.S.
- Died: May 24, 2019 (aged 94) Gallup, New Mexico, U.S.
- Party: Democratic
- Relations: Shannon Pinto (granddaughter)
- Education: University of New Mexico (BS, MA)

Military service
- Branch/service: United States Marine Corps
- Battles/wars: World War II

John Pinto (December 15, 1924 – May 24, 2019) was an American politician. He served as a Democratic member of the New Mexico Senate from 1977 until his death in 2019.

== Early life ==
Pinto was born in Lupton, Arizona, on the Navajo Nation. He earned a Bachelor of Science and Master of Arts degree from the University of New Mexico.

== Career ==
Pinto served in the United States Marine Corps during World War II and was a Navajo code talker. After leaving the military, Pinto was a teacher and organizer for the National Education Association. Elected to the New Mexico Senate in 1977, Pinto represented the 3rd district, which includes the Four Corners-area and spans much of western San Juan County, as well as a portion of western McKinley County. Much of the district is made up of the Navajo Nation and includes Shiprock, Sheep Springs, and part of Gallup. At 94, he was the longest-serving member in the Senate.

== Personal life ==
He died in office in Gallup, New Mexico, on May 24, 2019, at the age of 94. He was succeeded in office by his granddaughter, Shannon Pinto.
