= Manny Aragon =

American politician

Manny M. Aragon (born March 22, 1947) is an American politician who was formerly a member of the New Mexico State Senate, serving in that capacity from 1975 to 2004.

== Life ==
Manny M. Aragon was born to Charlotte and Mel Aragon.

== Career ==
Aragon served in the New Mexico Senate from 1975 to 2004 as a Democrat representing the Valencia and Bernalillo counties, District Fourteen.

Following the New Mexico State Penitentiary riot in 1980, Aragon assisted and comforted survivors.

In 1988, he was elected president pro tempore of the State Senate. He remained in that position until 2001.

In 2001, he served as the second Hispanic chairman of the Council of State Governments (CSG).

Aragon then served as president of New Mexico Highlands University.

== Later life ==
In 2009, as a private citizen, he was found guilty of three counts of conspiracy to defraud $4.4 million from the State of New Mexico during the construction of a new Court House. He was released in December 2013 after serving four and a half years in prison.

Aragon has two children.
