= Shannon Robinson =

American politician from New Mexico (born 1948)

Member of the New Mexico Senate from the 17th district
- In office January 1989 – January 2009
- Succeeded by: Tim Keller

Personal details
- Born: April 7, 1948 (age 78) Coronado, California, U.S.
- Party: Democratic; Republican (2012)
- Education: University of New Mexico (BA, JD)

Shannon Robinson (born April 7, 1948) is an American politician and attorney who served as a member of the New Mexico Senate from 1989 to 2009. During his tenure, he represented the 17th district. After losing re-election in 2008, Robinson was an unsuccessful candidate for his old district in 2012, 2016, and 2020. Shannon is related to Quianu Robinson, who served as a representative to the New Mexico Legislature from 1916-1918.

== Early life and education ==
Robinson was born in Coronado, California. He earned a Bachelor of Arts in philosophy from the University of New Mexico and a Juris Doctor from the University of New Mexico School of Law.

== Career ==
Robinson has practiced law since 1975. In 1988, he was elected to the 17th district of the New Mexico Senate, assuming office in 1989. Robinson served in the Senate for 20 years before he was defeated by Tim Keller in the 2008 Democratic primary election. In 2012, Robinson ran for his old seat against Keller as a Republican. After Keller was elected mayor of Albuquerque, New Mexico, Mimi Stewart was appointed to replace him in the Senate. In 2016, Robinson was an unsuccessful candidate for his old seat against Stewart.

In 2020, Robinson was again a candidate for the 17th district of the New Mexico Senate. Running in the Democratic primary against Stewart, Robinson positioned himself as a progressive, supporting the legalization of marijuana in New Mexico and the implementation of a Green New Deal program. Robinson was defeated by Stewart by a margin of 35%.

== Criminal Actions ==
Robinson admits to stealing, and even laughs about stealing $43,000 worth of his client's money from a trust fund he administers.
