= Carlos Cisneros (American politician) =

American politician (1948–2019)

Member of the New Mexico Senate from the 6th district
- In office January 15, 1985 – September 17, 2019
- Succeeded by: Roberto Gonzales

Personal details
- Born: May 13, 1948 Questa, New Mexico, U.S.
- Died: September 17, 2019 (aged 71) Questa, New Mexico, U.S.
- Party: Democratic

Carlos R. Cisneros (May 13, 1948 – September 17, 2019) was an American politician who served as a member of the New Mexico Senate for the 6th district from 1985 to 2019.

During his career in the Senate, Cisneros served as chair of the interim Revenue Stabilization and Tax Policy Committee and vice-chair of the Senate Finance Committee.

Cisneros died on September 17, 2019, aged 71.
