= Sue Wilson Beffort =

American politician

Member of the New Mexico Senate from the 19th district
- In office 1997–2016
- Preceded by: Duncan Scott
- Succeeded by: James P. White

Personal details
- Born: July 16, 1946 (age 80)
- Party: Republican
- Spouse: Steven R. Beffort
- Education: Southern Methodist University
- Website: Former Legislator of NM

Sue F. Wilson Beffort (born July 16, 1946) is an American Republican politician who served in the New Mexico State Senate from 1997 to 2016.

She was also the Republican nominee for Lt. Governor as the running mate of John Dendahl in 2006. Wilson Beffort has a bachelor's degree from Southern Methodist University. Her late husband, Steve Beffort, served as General Services Secretary under Republican Governor Gary Johnson.

Wilson Beffort listed her occupation on the official New Mexico Legislature website as Employment Consultant. She joined the New Mexico State Senate in 1997 representing the 19th district. The district covered a swath of small communities in Bernalillo, Sandoval, Santa Fe, and Torrance Counties. She resigned from the senate on 29 July 2016.

== Lieutenant Governor race ==
In 2006, Wilson Beffort was the Republican nominee for Lt. Governor of New Mexico. She ran as the running mate of John Dendahl after the elected gubernatorial candidate for governor was replaced by the state party. On June 17, 2006, Dr. J.R. Damron, who won the primary election to become the Republican nominee for the gubernatorial election, was pressured into resigning as the Republican candidate for Governor of New Mexico by Republican Party chairman Allen Weh and former chairman John Dendahl . Weh engaged in the effort against Damron because of supposed decreased name recognition. John Dendahl was appointed as the Republican candidate for Governor by Weh and the Republican party's Central Committee. Dendahl kept Wilson Beffort as his running mate. (Wilson Beffort had won the Republican primary in June 2006.) Dendahl and Wilson Beffort lost the election to Democrats Bill Richardson and Diane Denish.

== Breed specific legislation ==
In the January 2012 New Mexico Legislative session, Wilson Beffort angered dog lovers as well as the local humane society by proposing breed specific legislation (BSL). She advocated tightening the dangerous dog act by designating all pit bulls as dangerous dogs. The result of such legislation, if passed, would be that a dog could be killed as a suspect in a dog attack rather than requiring law enforcement to investigate whether or not the animal committed the attack, as the law currently read. Protests by concerned citizens, and ultimately by the Republican Governor (Susana Martinez) took the proposed legislation out of the realm of consideration. In response to Wilfort Beffort's 2012 bill, during the 2013 Legislature, Representative Yvette Herrell, R-Alamogordo proposed House Bill 63 that sought to prohibit municipalities and counties from enacting breed-specific regulations. The bill passed the state House, but later died in the Senate (where Wilson Beffort was still in office) when the bill ran out of time.

== Removal from ballot and 2012 re-election ==
In March 2012, the New Mexico Secretary of State Dianna Duran considered cutting Wilson Beffort's name from the election ballot, because Wilson Beffort's nominating forms were completed incorrectly. By March 26, 2012, Duran allowed Wilson Beffort to remain on the ballot, along with seven others who had errors on their applications to run for office. A subsequent lawsuit by Rep. Thomas Garcia (D-Ocaté) was lost, so Wilson Beffort was allowed to remain on the ballot. She ran unopposed in the June 5, 2012 Republican primary. No Democratic candidates filed to run in the general election of November 6, 2012.
