= Linda M. Lopez =

American politician (born 1964)

Linda Lopez

Member of the New Mexico Senate from the 11th district
- Incumbent
- Assumed office 1997
- Preceded by: Tom R. Benavides

Personal details
- Born: March 13, 1964 (age 62) Albuquerque, New Mexico, U.S.
- Party: Democratic
- Children: 2
- Education: College of Santa Fe (BBA, MBA)

Linda M. Lopez (born March 13, 1964) is an American politician and businesswoman serving as a member of the New Mexico Senate from the 11th district. Lopez has also served as the chair of the Bernalillo County Democratic Party since 2003.

== Early life and education ==
Lopez was born in Albuquerque, New Mexico. She earned a bachelor's and master's degree in business administration from the College of Santa Fe. While in the legislature, she attended University of New Mexico School of Law but dropped out when her mother fell ill.

== Career ==
Lopez previously worked in the human resources department at and Sandia National Laboratories and Albuquerque's Presbyterian Hospital. She owns a consulting firm based in Albuquerque.

=== New Mexico Senate ===
Lopez was first elected to the New Mexico Senate in 1996, representing a district that includes the southwest portion of Albuquerque, New Mexico. She has served since 1997 and is the longtime chair of the Senate Rules Committee. She was also the Chairman of the Bernalillo County Democratic Party from 2003 to 2004. She was an unsuccessful candidate for the Democratic nomination for Lieutenant Governor of New Mexico in 2010, coming fourth out of five candidates.

Lopez ran for the Democratic nomination for governor in the 2014 New Mexico gubernatorial election. She came in last place in the Democratic primary election: state Attorney General Gary King won the nomination with about 35% of the vote, Santa Fe Mayor Alan Webber received about 23%, Lawrence Rael received about 20%, Howie Morales received about 14%, and Lopez received about 8%.

In the Senate, Lopez has supported renewable energy mandates and a moratorium on fracking. She supported allowing unaffiliated voters to participate in primary elections, increased funding for early childhood education and other early childhood services, and the use of emergency powers to combat the COVID-19 pandemic in New Mexico. Lopez voted in favor of medical marijuana in New Mexico and stated that, "With proper oversight and structure, I will support legalizing recreational marijuana." She has supported legislation to mandate the wearing of body-worn cameras by almost all state and local law enforcement officers in New Mexico. A supporter of abortion rights, Lopez sponsored legislation to remove from New Mexico's statute books the state's 1969 anti-abortion law, which had been largely unenforceable at the time because of Roe v. Wade (1973); the proposal failed in a 24–18 vote in the state Senate.

Lopez has sponsored legislation in 2019 to create a task force to design a monument at the site of the Battle of Glorieta Pass, an 1862 American Civil War battle in which Union forces beat back a Confederate Army advance.

== Personal life ==
Lopez is Roman Catholic. She is divorced and has one son and a daughter.

On January 3, 2023, a suspect fired over a dozen gunshots at Lopez's home, three of which went through Lopez's 10-year-old daughter's bedroom. No injuries were reported. Solomon Peña, an unsuccessful Republican candidate for state representative, was later arrested in connection with the shooting, along with several other shootings that targeted Democratic politicians in Albuquerque.
