= Bernadette Sanchez =

American politician

Member of the New Mexico Senate from the 26th district
- In office 2001–2013
- Preceded by: Phillip Maloof
- Succeeded by: Jacob Candelaria

Personal details
- Born: May 20, 1953 (age 73)
- Party: Democratic
- Profession: School counselor

Bernadette M. Sanchez (born May 20, 1953) is an American politician and a Democratic former member of the New Mexico Senate, representing the 26th District since 2001. She did not seek re-election in 2012 and was succeeded by Democrat Jacob Candelaria in 2013.
