= Stuart Ingle =

American politician

Minority Leader of the New Mexico Senate
- In office January 2001 – January 19, 2021
- Preceded by: Skip Vernon
- Succeeded by: Gregory A. Baca

Member of the New Mexico Senate from the 27th district
- In office January 1985 – October 25, 2023
- Succeeded by: Greg Nibert

Personal details
- Born: Cress Stuart Ingle; December 27, 1947 (age 78) Clovis, New Mexico, U.S.
- Party: Republican
- Education: Oklahoma State University, Stillwater (BS)

Cress Stuart Ingle (born December 27, 1947) is a former Republican member of the New Mexico Senate, representing the 27th District from 1985 to 2023. He served as minority leader for twenty years.

Ingle announced his retirement from the Senate in October 2023.

New Mexico Senate
Preceded by Skip Vernon	Minority Leader of the New Mexico Senate; 2001–2021	Succeeded by Gregory A. Baca
