= Lidio Rainaldi =

American politician (1929–2019)

Member of the New Mexico Senate from the 4th district
- In office 2001–2008

Personal details
- Born: March 12, 1929 Gamerco, New Mexico, U.S.
- Died: December 21, 2019 (aged 90) Gallup, New Mexico, U.S.
- Party: Democratic
- Occupation: magistrate

Lidio G. Rainaldi (March 12, 1929 – December 21, 2019) was a Democratic member of the New Mexico Senate. He represented the 4th District from 2001 to 2008. He died on December 21, 2019, aged 90.
