= John Arthur Smith =

American politician (1942–2024)

Member of the New Mexico Senate from the 35th district
- In office 1989–2020
- Succeeded by: Crystal Diamond

Personal details
- Born: July 7, 1941
- Died: October 7, 2024 (aged 83) Deming, New Mexico, United States
- Party: Democratic
- Education: University of New Mexico
- Occupation: Real estate appraiser

John Arthur Smith (July 7, 1941 – October 7, 2024) was an American politician who served as a member of the New Mexico Senate, representing the 35th District from 1989 to 2021.

In 2002, he sought to represent New Mexico's second congressional district when veteran congressman Joe Skeen announced that he was retiring. He defeated Las Cruces mayor Ruben Smith in the Democratic primary, but ultimately lost to Republican Steve Pearce 56 to 44 percent.

== Career ==
Smith chaired the Senate Finance Committee. He had been nicknamed "Dr. No" for fiscal conservatism, breaking with his party to refuse funding for many spending programs. Critics have called Smith "the primary obstacle to more substantial investment in early childhood education" for his refusal to allow a vote on whether to withdraw 1% more each year from the state's $18 billion Land Grant Permanent Fund to fund early childhood programs.

Smith faced opposition in the 2020 Democratic primary from Neomi Martinez-Parra, a special education teacher and former New Mexico Democratic Party vice chair. In the July 2, 2020, primary, Smith lost to Martinez-Parra.

== Death ==
Smith died at his home in Deming on October 7, 2024, at the age of 83.
