= Nancy Rodriguez (politician) =

American politician

Member of the New Mexico Senate from the 24th district
- In office 1996 – December 31, 2024
- Succeeded by: Linda Trujillo

Personal details
- Born: March 18, 1953 (age 73)
- Party: Democratic
- Occupation: consultant

Nancy E. Rodriguez (born March 18, 1953) is an American politician who served as a Democratic member of the New Mexico Senate from the 24th district from 1996 to 2024.

Rodriguez did not standing for re-election in the 2024 New Mexico State Senate election.
