= Carroll Leavell =

American politician (1936–2023)

Carroll H. Leavell

Member of the New Mexico Senate from the 41st district
- In office January 1997 – December 3, 2018
- Preceded by: Billy McKibben
- Succeeded by: Gregg Fulfer

Personal details
- Born: October 23, 1936 Clovis, New Mexico, U.S.
- Died: June 26, 2023 (aged 86)
- Party: Republican
- Education: Eastern New Mexico University

Carroll Leavell (October 23, 1936 – June 26, 2023) was an American politician who was a Republican member of the New Mexico Senate representing District 41 from January 1997 to his retirement in December 2018.

== Biography ==
Leavell earned his BA from Eastern New Mexico University. He died on June 26, 2023, at the age of 86.

== Elections ==
- 1996: When District 41 Republican Senator Billy McKibben left the Legislature and left the seat open, Leavell was unopposed for the June 4, 1996 Republican primary, winning with 530 votes and won the November 5 general election against Democratic nominee Pat Darcy.
- 2000: Leavell was unopposed for both the 2000 Republican primary, winning with 606 votes and the November 2 general election, winning with 2,749 votes.
- 2004: He was again unopposed for both the June 1, 2004 Republican primary, winning with 1,309 votes and the November 2 general election, winning with 9,042 votes.
- 2008: He was not challenged by anybody for both the June 8, 2008 Republican primary, winning with 1,619 votes and the November 4 general election, winning with 8,702 votes.
- 2012: Leavell faced no opposition for both the June 5, 2012 Republican primary, winning with 1,303 votes and the November 6 general election, winning with 8,413 votes.
- 2016: He again faced no challengers for both the June 7, 2016 Republican primary, garnering 1,741 votes and the November 8 general election, where he won with 9,006 votes. These were his last contests.
