= Michael S. Sanchez =

American politician

Michael Sanchez

Majority Leader of the New Mexico Senate
- In office January 2005 – December 31, 2016
- Preceded by: Manny Aragón
- Succeeded by: Peter Wirth

Member of the New Mexico Senate from the 29th district
- In office January 1, 1993 – December 31, 2016
- Succeeded by: Gregory A. Baca

Personal details
- Born: August 3, 1950 (age 75) Belen, New Mexico, U.S.
- Party: Democratic
- Spouse: Lynn Sanchez
- Education: Iowa Western Community College (attended); University of New Mexico (BA, JD)

Michael S. Sanchez (born August 3, 1950) is an American attorney and politician who served in the New Mexico Senate from 1993 to 2016, representing the 29th District (Valencia and Bernalillo Counties). He was defeated in his bid for re-election in 2016.

== Early life and education ==
Sanchez was born in Belen, New Mexico to Gil and Priscilla Sanchez. He is the youngest of four children, including Raymond G. Sanchez, an attorney who served in the New Mexico House of Representatives. Sanchez attended Belen High School and moved to Clarinda, Iowa to attend Iowa Western Community College, where he played baseball and basketball. Sanchez finished school at University of New Mexico. Sanchez then earned a Juris Doctor from the University of New Mexico School of Law.

== Career ==
After graduating from law school, Sanchez was admitted to the State Bar of New Mexico.

Before serving as a State Senator, Sanchez served as the county chairman of the Democratic Party in Valencia County. Sanchez was first elected to the State Senate in 1992.

During his years of service, Sanchez focused on creating better jobs, education and protecting working families. One of his notable legislative accomplishments was the creation of the New Mexico Lottery Scholarship, which has provided thousands of New Mexico high school students with financial assistance to attend college. The Lottery Scholarship was enacted in 1996.

Sanchez served as the Majority Leader of the New Mexico State Senate.

== Personal life ==
Sanchez married Lynn (Trembly) Sanchez in 1969. They have two sons and a daughter.

New Mexico Senate
| Preceded by Manny Aragón | Majority Leader of the New Mexico Senate; 2005–2016 | Succeeded by Peter Wirth |
