= Mary Jane Garcia =

American politician (1936–2024)

Member of the New Mexico Senate from the 36th district
- In office 1988–2012
- Succeeded by: Lee S. Cotter (Republican)

Personal details
- Born: December 24, 1936 Doña Ana, New Mexico, U.S.
- Died: January 5, 2024 (aged 87)
- Party: Democratic
- Education: City College of San Francisco, New Mexico State University
- Occupation: Businesswoman

Mary Jane M. Garcia (December 24, 1936 – January 5, 2024) was an American politician, Democratic member of the New Mexico Senate. She represented the 36th District from 1988 to 2012.

== Biography ==
In 1936 Mary Jane Garcia was born in Doña Ana, New Mexico. Garcia is related to the original founders that settled Doña Ana village circa 1840. In 1966, as a Red Cross volunteer at the Third Field Army Hospital during the Vietnam War, Garcia developed her call to public service. After time spent abroad, Garcia returned to her native roots and began coursework in an anthropology degree program at New Mexico State University. Garcia earned a BA in anthropology in 1983 and an MA in anthropology in 1985. Upon completion of her master's degree in 1985, Mary Jane Garcia published a thesis titled: "An Ethno History of Doña Ana" which became the first documented history of Doña Ana Village. In 1988 Mary Jane Garcia won a bid to the New Mexico state Senate to represent Senate District 36. Garcia was later a businesswoman. She died on January 5, 2024, at the age of 87.

== News coverage ==
- NEA announces Sen. Garcia to receive Reg Weaver Human and Civil Rights Award
- A column was published in the Albuquerque Journal newspaper Sunday July 11, 2010.
- On Sunday December 31, 2000, the Santa Fe New Mexican newspaper reports: Sen. Garcia receives the Executive Director's Award for distinguished achievement in assuring humane treatment of animals. Senator Garcia passed legislation making extreme animal cruelty a felony offense.
- Cockfighting group wants to 'dig up dirt' about three people pushing for law
- An article was published in the USA Today, March 12, 2007.
- Despite serving on the Senate's Ethics Subcommittee Senator Garcia was criticized for using her public position to protect her bar's interests when cited for serving minors and serving intoxicated patrons.
- In 2006 Garcia criticized Governor Bill Richardson for enacting tougher penalties for serving minors and intoxicated persons. On May 25, 2007, Garcia's own bar, Victoria's Lounge, was cited for serving intoxicated persons. Several weeks later Garcia held a meeting in Mesilla, to criticize Regulation and Licensing Department officials.

Garcia was criticized for creating an appearance of impropriety as a result of the citation.

=== Death of Angel Jimenez ===
On July 12, 2010, the Las Cruces Sun-News ran an article entitled "Garcia: Campaign to blame for death." In light of extreme child abuse of 5-year-old Angel Jimenez that resulted in death, Sen. Garcia made the following comment: "Everyone's running for office right now. I don't know who's running the district attorney's office, the sheriff's office. Everyone's running around campaigning for office." The Sun-News article states that Garcia is campaigning for current Lieutenant Governor Diane Denish (D), who is running for governor against current Doña Ana District Attorney, Susana Martinez (R).

County officials (including D.A. Martinez) were quick to respond to Garcia's comments. Martinez stated "...that a criminal case did not come into the district attorney's office in reference to this child and a child abuse investigation, prior to her recent admission to the hospital." She also stated "We did not receive a criminal case for review or prosecution prior to that date."

County Sheriff Todd Garrison was quoted in the article: "As far as campaigning, I haven't done a darn thing ... I think I put four signs up," Garrison said. "That didn't take but 15 minutes, and my brother did that."

=== Investigation of Governor Bill Richardson ===
In December 2008, news of an investigation into Bill Richardson's political contributions started to make national news. The news of the federal investigation into Richardson's GRIP (Governor Richardson's Investment Partnership) was reported on as early as August 28, 2008, by New Mexico political reporter Heath Haussamen.

In light of this investigation, Bill Richardson withdrew his nomination as Secretary of Commerce. Sen. Garcia commented on his withdrawal, and her comments were published in the January 6, 2009, edition of the Las Cruces Sun-News. She commented that Richardson's withdrawal "the most shocking thing I've ever heard," and continued by saying "[she] didn't know about any investigation going on." Garcia also stated she thought "...there was something mentioned early on in the media, but it wasn't anything substantive. ... I haven't been aware of any investigation."

Sen. Garcia's comments contrast Senator John Smith's (D-Deming) which were,"[We] weren't surprised" at the withdrawal.
