= Pete Campos =

American politician and educator

Member of the New Mexico Senate from the 8th district
- Incumbent
- Assumed office 1991

Personal details
- Born: 1954 (age 71–72)
- Party: Democratic
- Education: University of New Mexico (BA), (EdD); New Mexico Highlands University (MA)
- Profession: Educator

Pete Campos (born 1954) is an American politician and educator serving as a Democratic member of the New Mexico Senate, representing the 8th District since 1991. Campos also serves as President of Luna Community College in Las Vegas, New Mexico.

Campos previously served as Mayor of Santa Rosa, New Mexico, which serves as the county seat for Guadalupe County, from 1986 until he was elected to the New Mexico Senate in 1990.
