= Ben D. Altamirano =

American politician (1930–2007)

Ben Altamirano

Member of the New Mexico Senate from the 28th district
- In office 1971–2007
- Succeeded by: Howie Morales

Personal details
- Born: Ben D. Altamirano; October 17, 1930 Silver City, New Mexico, U.S.
- Died: December 27, 2007 (aged 77)
- Party: Democratic
- Education: Western New Mexico University

Military service
- Branch/service: United States Army
- Battles/wars: World War II

Ben D. Altamirano (October 17, 1930 – December 27, 2007) was an American politician and businessman who served as a member of the New Mexico Senate from 1971 until his death in 2007.

== Early life and education ==
Altamirano was born in Silver City, New Mexico in 1930. He enlisted in the United States Army in 1946 and served with the European occupation forces after World War II. After his stint in the Army, he attended Western New Mexico University from 1948-1951.

== Career ==
Altamirano began his political career on the Silver City Town Council, where he served for 10 years. He then served for four years on the Grant County Commission.

In 1970, Altamirano was elected to the New Mexico Senate, representing District 28. He took office in 1971 and served until his death. At the time of his death, Senator Altamirano was the longest-serving senator in the history of the State of New Mexico.

Altamirano ran for lieutenant governor in 1994. He was one of four candidates in the Democratic primary and lost the primary to Patricia Madrid, who lost that November.

Altamirano served as chairman of the powerful Finance Committee for 17 years before being selected by his colleagues to serve as President Pro Tempore in 2003.

== Personal life ==
Altamirano owned several grocery stores for 40 years and was married to Nina Melendrez. They had two sons and a daughter, and also helped raise their nieces and nephew.

=== Death ===
Altamirano died from a heart attack on December 27, 2007. He was 77. He had suffered from heart ailments since 1981 and had recently undergone surgery. He was buried in Memory Lane Cemetery in Silver City, New Mexico. He was survived by his wife, his three children, and other family members. On January 9, 2008, Governor Bill Richardson appointed Grant County Clerk Howie Morales to succeed Altamirano.
