= Mark Boitano =

American politician

Member of the New Mexico Senate from the 18th district
- In office January 1997 – January 2013
- Succeeded by: Lisa Torraco

Personal details
- Born: July 19, 1953 (age 73) San Francisco, California, U.S.
- Party: Republican
- Relations: Brian Boitano (brother)
- Education: Regents College (BS)

Mark L. Boitano (born July 19, 1953) is an American politician and real estate agent who served as a member of the New Mexico Senate for the 18th district from 1997 to 2012.

== Early life and education ==
Boitano was born in San Francisco and graduated from Bellarmine College Preparatory in San Jose, California. He earned a Bachelor of Science degree in political science from Regents College of the University of the State of New York (now Excelsior University), in 1989.

== Career ==
Boitano was elected to the New Mexico Senate in 1996 and assumed office in 1997. Boitano did not seek re-election in 2012 and left office in January 2013. During his tenure, Boitano also served as ranking member of the Senate Corporations and Transportation Committee. Since 1992, Boitano has worked as a real estate broker.

== Personal life ==
Boitano's brother, Brian Boitano, is a retired Olympic figure skater.
