= Rod Adair =

American politician

Member of the New Mexico Senate from the 33rd district
- In office January 21, 1997 – January 15, 2013
- Preceded by: Emmit Jennings
- Succeeded by: William Burt

Personal details
- Born: November 19, 1953 (age 72) Hagerman, New Mexico, U.S.
- Party: Republican
- Spouse: Dana
- Children: 2
- Education: Eastern New Mexico University (BA); Campbell University (MA)

Military service
- Branch/service: United States Army
- Years of service: 1976–1996

Rod Adair (born November 19, 1953) is an American politician who served as a member of the New Mexico Senate from the 33rd district from 1997 to 2013.

== Early life and education ==
Adair was born in Hagerman, New Mexico, on November 19, 1953, and graduated from Hagerman High School. He earned a Bachelor of Arts degree in political science from Eastern New Mexico University in 1975 and a Master of Arts in government from Campbell University in 1985.

== Career ==
Adair served in the United States Army from 1976 to 1996 and was stationed in Korea and 15 South American countries. He ended his career as a professor of military science at the New Mexico Military Institute in Roswell. Adair was elected to the New Mexico Senate in 1996 and assumed office in 1997. Also in 1996, Adair founded New Mexico Demographic Research.

Initially a candidate for re-election in 2012, Adair withdrew from the race after facing a primary challenge from William Burt. Adair has since worked as the editor of the New Mexico Political Journal. Adair has also written op-ed columns about New Mexico politics for the Albuquerque Journal and worked as an election manager and aide in the office of Secretary of State Dianna Duran.

== Personal life ==
Adair and his wife, Dana, have two children. Dana is an elementary school teacher.
