= Timothy Jennings =

American politician

Timothy Z. Jennings

Member of the New Mexico Senate from the 32nd district
- In office 1978–2012
- Succeeded by: Cliff Pirtle

Personal details
- Born: September 4, 1950 (age 76) Roswell, New Mexico, U.S.
- Party: Democratic
- Education: New Mexico Military Institute (AS); Creighton University (BS)

Timothy Zeph Jennings (born September 4, 1950) is an American politician currently serving as Mayor of Roswell, New Mexico, having been elected in 2022. He served as a member of the New Mexico Senate for the 32nd district from 1978 to 2012.

== Early life and education ==
Jennings was born in Roswell, New Mexico, in 1950. He graduated from the New Mexico Military Institute in 1968 and earned a Bachelor of Science degree in business administration from Creighton University in 1972.

== Career ==
Jennings served as majority whip from 1992 through 1996, and is a former county commissioner. Governor Susana Martinez heavily opposed him in the 2012 election and he was defeated by Republican Cliff Pirtle. Jennings is a friend of Republican National Committee member Harvey Yates Jr., who withdrew his support from Martinez after the 2012 election. After leaving the legislature, Jennings became a lobbyist in the healthcare industry.

== See also ==
- List of mayors of Roswell, New Mexico
