= Dede Feldman =

American politician

Member of the New Mexico Senate from the 13th district
- In office 1997 – January 2013
- Succeeded by: Bill O'Neill

Personal details
- Born: March 10, 1947 (age 79) West Chester, Pennsylvania, U.S.
- Party: Democratic
- Spouse: Mark
- Children: one
- Education: University of Pennsylvania
- Profession: Business owner, adjunct professor, journalist

Dede Feldman (born March 10, 1947, in West Chester, Pennsylvania) is a Democratic former member of the New Mexico Senate, representing the 13th District from 1997 to 2013. She did not seek reelection in 2012.
