= Don Kidd =

American politician (1937–2020)

Member of the New Mexico Senate for the 34th district
- In office 1993–2005

Personal details
- Born: October 10, 1937 Crowell, Texas, United States
- Died: August 27, 2020 (aged 82) Carlsbad, New Mexico
- Party: Republican
- Spouse: Sarrah
- Profession: banker

Don Kidd (October 10, 1937 – August 27, 2020) was an American politician who served as a Republican member of the New Mexico State Senate from 1993 to 2005. He died on August 27, 2020, at his home in Carlsbad, New Mexico, at the age of 82. The cause of his death was not disclosed. Kidd attended Southern Methodist University and worked as a banker, eventually becoming the president and CEO of Western Commerce Bank.
