= 2012 New Mexico Senate election =

- November 6, 2012

All 42 seats in the New Mexico Senate 22 seats needed for a majority
	Majority party	Minority party
Leader	Timothy Jennings (lost re-election)	Stuart Ingle
Party	Democratic	Republican
Leader's seat	32nd - Roswell	27th - Portales
Last election	27	15
Seats before	28	14 (Note: Republican Kent Cravens resigned his seat on September 29, 2011. Democrat Lisa Curtis was appointed to fill the balance of his term.)
Seats won	25	17
Seat change	▼3	▲3
Popular vote	380,509	273,676
Percentage	57.13%	41.09%
- Democratic gain Republican gain Democratic hold Republican hold 50–60% 60–70% 70–80% >90% 50–60% 60–70% 70–80% >90%
President pro tempore before election
Timothy Jennings
Democratic
Elected President pro tempore
Mary Kay Papen
Democratic

The 2012 New Mexico Senate election took place as part of the biennial United States elections. New Mexico voters elected state senators in all 42 of the state senate's districts. State senators serve four-year terms in the New Mexico Senate. The election coincided with elections for other offices, including for U.S. President, U.S. Senate, U.S House, and state house.

A primary election on June 5, 2012, determined which candidates appeared on the November 6th general election ballot.

== Predictions ==
Source	Ranking	As of
Governing	Likely D	October 24, 2012

== Results summary ==
District	Incumbent	Party	Elected senator	Party
1	William Sharer	Rep	William Sharer	Rep
2	Steven Neville	Rep	Steven Neville	Rep
3	John Pinto	Dem	John Pinto	Dem
4	George Muñoz	Dem	George Muñoz	Dem
5	Richard Martinez	Dem	Richard Martinez	Dem
6	Carlos Cisneros	Dem	Carlos Cisneros	Dem
7	Clinton Harden	Rep	Pat Woods	Rep
8	Pete Campos	Dem	Pete Campos	Dem
9	John Sapien	Dem	John Sapien	Dem
10	John Ryan	Rep	John Ryan	Rep
11	Linda Lopez	Dem	Linda Lopez	Dem
12	Jerry Ortiz y Pino	Dem	Jerry Ortiz y Pino	Dem
12	Eric Griego (Note: Redistricted from the 14th district.)	Dem	Jerry Ortiz y Pino	Dem
13	Dede Feldman	Dem	Bill O'Neill	Dem
14	New Seat		Michael Padilla	Dem
15	Tim Eichenberg	Dem	Daniel Ivey-Soto	Dem
16	Cisco McSorley	Dem	Cisco McSorley	Dem
17	Tim Keller	Dem	Tim Keller	Dem
18	Mark Boitano	Rep	Lisa Torraco	Rep
19	Sue Wilson Beffort	Rep	Sue Wilson Beffort	Rep
20	William Payne	Rep	William Payne	Rep
21	Lisa Curtis	Dem	Mark Moores	Rep
22	Lynda Lovejoy	Dem	Benny Shendo	Dem
23	Sander Rue	Rep	Sander Rue	Rep
24	Nancy Rodriguez	Dem	Nancy Rodriguez	Dem
25	Peter Wirth	Dem	Peter Wirth	Dem
26	Bernadette Sanchez	Dem	Jacob Candelaria	Dem
27	Stuart Ingle	Rep	Stuart Ingle	Rep
28	Howie Morales	Dem	Howie Morales	Dem
29	Michael Sanchez	Dem	Michael Sanchez	Dem
30	David Ulibarri	Dem	Clemente Sanchez	Dem
31	Cynthia Nava	Dem	Joe Cervantes	Dem
32	Timothy Jennings	Dem	Cliff Pirtle	Rep
33	Rod Adair	Rep	William Burt	Rep
33	William Burt (Note: Redistricted from the 40th district.)	Rep	William Burt	Rep
34	Vernon Asbill	Rep	Ron Griggs	Rep
35	John Arthur Smith	Dem	John Arthur Smith	Dem
36	Mary Jane Garcia	Dem	Lee Cotter	Rep
37	Stephen Fischmann	Dem	William Soules	Dem
38	Mary Kay Papen	Dem	Mary Kay Papen	Dem
39	Phil Griego	Dem	Phil Griego	Dem
40	New Seat		Craig Brandt	Rep
41	Carroll Leavell	Rep	Carroll Leavell	Rep
42	Gay Kernan	Rep	Gay Kernan	Rep

Party	Candi- dates	Votes		Seats		
Party	Candi- dates	No.	%	No.	+/–	%
Democratic	34	380,509	57.13%	25	▼3	59.52%
Republican	27	273,676	41.09%	17	▲3	40.48%
Independent	2	11,899	1.79%	0	Steady	0.00%
Total	63	666,084	100%	42	Steady	100%

Popular vote
Democratic	57.13%
Republican	41.09%
Independent	1.79%

Senate seats
Democratic	59.52%
Republican	40.48%

=== Retiring incumbents ===
- Clinton Harden (R-District 7)
- Eric Griego (D-District 12) (Note: Redistricted from the 14th district.)
- Dede Feldman (D-District 13)
- Tim Eichenberg (D-District 15)
- Mark Boitano (R-District 18)
- Bernadette Sanchez (D-District 26)
- Cynthia Nava (D-District 31)
- Rod Adair (R-District 33)
- Vernon Asbill (R-District 34)
- Stephen Fischmann (D-District 37)

=== Incumbents defeated in the primary election ===
- Lynda Lovejoy (D-District 22), defeated by Benny Shendo (D)
- David Ulibarri (D-District 30), defeated by Clemente Sanchez (D)

=== Incumbents defeated in the general election ===
- Lisa Curtis (D-District 21), defeated by Mark Moores (R)
- Timothy Jennings (D-District 32), defeated by Cliff Pirtle (R)
- Mary Jane Garcia (D-District 36), defeated by Lee Cotter (R)

== Detailed results ==
Source for primary election results: Source for general election results:

=== District 1 ===
Incumbent Republican William Sharer has represented the 1st district since 2001.

New Mexico Senate 1st district general election, 2012
Party	Candidate	Votes	%
Republican	William Sharer (incumbent)	11,212	70.76%
Democratic	Matt Dodson	4,633	29.24%
Total votes		15,845	100%
Republican hold			

=== District 2 ===
Incumbent Republican Steven Neville has represented the 2nd district since 2005.

New Mexico Senate 2nd district general election, 2012
Party	Candidate	Votes	%
Republican	Steven Neville (incumbent)	14,168	100%
Total votes		14,168	100%
Republican hold			

=== District 3 ===
Incumbent Democrat John Pinto has represented the 3rd district since 1977. Democratic primary

New Mexico Senate 3rd district Democratic primary election, 2012
Party	Candidate	Votes	%
Democratic	John Pinto (incumbent)	2,709	72.01%
Democratic	Matthew Tso	1,053	27.99%
Total votes		3,762	100%

General election

New Mexico Senate 3rd district general election, 2012
Party	Candidate	Votes	%
Democratic	John Pinto (incumbent)	12,578	100%
Total votes		12,578	100%
Democratic hold			

=== District 4 ===
Incumbent Democrat George Muñoz has represented the 4th district since 2009. Democratic primary

New Mexico Senate 4th district Democratic primary election, 2012
Party	Candidate	Votes	%
Democratic	George Muñoz (incumbent)	2,614	56.31%
Democratic	Genevieve Jackson	1,708	36.79%
Democratic	Charles Rountree	320	6.89%
Total votes		4,642	100%

General election

New Mexico Senate 4th district general election, 2012
Party	Candidate	Votes	%
Democratic	George Muñoz (incumbent)	11,673	100%
Total votes		11,673	100%
Democratic hold			

=== District 5 ===
Incumbent Democrat Richard Martinez has represented the 5th district since 2001. Democratic primary

New Mexico Senate 5th district Democratic primary election, 2012
Party	Candidate	Votes	%
Democratic	Richard Martinez (incumbent)	4,721	57.62%
Democratic	Alfredo Montoya	3,473	42.38%
Total votes		8,194	100%

General election

New Mexico Senate 5th district general election, 2012
Party	Candidate	Votes	%
Democratic	Richard Martinez (incumbent)	15,255	100%
Total votes		15,255	100%
Democratic hold			

=== District 6 ===
Incumbent Democrat Carlos Cisneros has represented the 6th district since 1985.

New Mexico Senate 6th district general election, 2012
Party	Candidate	Votes	%
Democratic	Carlos Cisneros (incumbent)	17,613	100%
Total votes		17,613	100%
Democratic hold			

=== District 7 ===
Incumbent Republican Clinton Harden has represented the 7th district since 2003. Harden didn't seek re-election and fellow Republican Pat Woods won the open seat. Republican primary

New Mexico Senate 7th district Republican primary election, 2012
Party	Candidate	Votes	%
Republican	Pat Woods	2,296	51.97%
Republican	Angela Spears	1,997	45.20%
Republican	Mark Myers	125	2.83%
Total votes		4,418	100%

General election

New Mexico Senate 7th district general election, 2012
Party	Candidate	Votes	%
Republican	Pat Woods	12,595	100%
Total votes		12,595	100%
Republican hold			

=== District 8 ===
Incumbent Democrat Pete Campos has represented the 8th district since 1991. State Representative Thomas Garcis unsuccessfully challenged Campos for the Democratic nomination. Democratic primary

New Mexico Senate 8th district Democratic primary election, 2012
Party	Candidate	Votes	%
Democratic	Pete Campos (incumbent)	5,376	62.06%
Democratic	Thomas Garcia	3,286	37.94%
Total votes		8,662	100%

General election

New Mexico Senate 8th district general election, 2012
Party	Candidate	Votes	%
Democratic	Pete Campos (incumbent)	15,820	100%
Total votes		15,820	100%
Democratic hold			

=== District 9 ===
Incumbent Democrat John Sapien has represented the 9th district since 2009. Democratic primary

New Mexico Senate 9th district Democratic primary election, 2012
Party	Candidate	Votes	%
Democratic	John Sapien (incumbent)	2,270	55.31%
Democratic	Benjamin Hayden Rodefer	1,834	44.69%
Total votes		4,104	100%

General election

New Mexico Senate 9th district general election, 2012
Party	Candidate	Votes	%
Democratic	John Sapien (incumbent)	11,654	50.35%
Republican	David Doyle	11,492	49.65%
Total votes		23,146	100%
Democratic hold			

=== District 10 ===
Incumbent Republican John Ryan has represented the 10th district since 2005.

New Mexico Senate 10th district general election, 2012
Party	Candidate	Votes	%
Republican	John Ryan (incumbent)	10,063	54.29%
Independent	Joseph Carraro	8,474	45.71%
Total votes		18,537	100%
Republican hold			

=== District 11 ===
Incumbent Democrat Linda Lopez has represented the 11th district since 1997.

New Mexico Senate 11th district general election, 2012
Party	Candidate	Votes	%
Democratic	Linda Lopez (incumbent)	8,346	100%
Total votes		8,346	100%
Democratic hold			

=== District 12 ===
The new 12th district includes the homes of incumbent Democrats Jerry Ortiz y Pino, who has represented the 12th district since 2005, and Eric Griego, who has represented the 14th district since 2009. Griego retired to run for Congress while Ortiz y Pino was re-elected here.

New Mexico Senate 12th district general election, 2012
Party	Candidate	Votes	%
Democratic	Jerry Ortiz y Pino (incumbent)	13,341	100%
Total votes		13,341	100%
Democratic hold			

=== District 13 ===
Incumbent Democrat Dede Feldman has represented the 13th district since 1997. Feldman didn't seek re-election and fellow Democrat Bill O'Neill won the open seat. Democratic primary

New Mexico Senate 13th district Democratic primary election, 2012
Party	Candidate	Votes	%
Democratic	Bill O'Neill	2,620	52.98%
Democratic	Carlos Cordova	1,362	27.54%
Democratic	Chris Catechis	963	19.47%
Total votes		4,945	100%

General election

New Mexico Senate 13th district general election, 2012
Party	Candidate	Votes	%
Democratic	Bill O'Neill	15,516	100%
Total votes		15,516	100%
Democratic hold			

=== District 14 ===
The new 14th district is based in southwestern Bernalillo County and includes much of South Valley. The district has no incumbent. Democrat Michael Padilla won the open seat. Democratic primary

New Mexico Senate 14th district Democratic primary election, 2012
Party	Candidate	Votes	%
Democratic	Michael Padilla	1,065	40.54%
Democratic	Eleanor Chavez	798	30.38%
Democratic	James Taylor	764	29.08%
Total votes		2,627	100%

General election

New Mexico Senate 14th district general election, 2012
Party	Candidate	Votes	%
Democratic	Michael Padilla	8,258	70.68%
Independent	Robert Schiller	3,425	29.32%
Total votes		11,683	100%
Democratic win (new seat)			

=== District 15 ===
Incumbent Democrat Tim Eichenberg has represented the 15th district since 2009. Eichenberg didn't seek re-election and fellow Democrat Daniel Ivey-Soto won the open seat.

New Mexico Senate 15th district general election, 2012
Party	Candidate	Votes	%
Democratic	Daniel Ivey-Soto	10,927	52.89%
Republican	Diane Snyder	9,733	47.11%
Total votes		20,660	100%
Democratic hold			

=== District 16 ===
Incumbent Democrat Cisco McSorley has represented the 16th district since 1997.

New Mexico Senate 16th district general election, 2012
Party	Candidate	Votes	%
Democratic	Cisco McSorley (incumbent)	16,636	100%
Total votes		16,636	100%
Democratic hold			

=== District 17 ===
Incumbent Democrat Tim Keller has represented the 17th district since 2009.

New Mexico Senate 17th district general election, 2012
Party	Candidate	Votes	%
Democratic	Tim Keller (incumbent)	7,481	64.84%
Republican	Shannon Robinson	4,057	35.16%
Total votes		11,538	100%
Democratic hold			

=== District 18 ===
Incumbent Republican Mark Boitano has represented the 18th district since 1997. Boitano didn't seek re-election and fellow Republican Lisa Torraco won the open seat. Republican primary

New Mexico Senate 18th district Republican primary election, 2012
Party	Candidate	Votes	%
Republican	Lisa Torraco	2,045	61.04%
Republican	Gerges Scott	1,305	38.96%
Total votes		3,350	100%

General election

New Mexico Senate 18th district general election, 2012
Party	Candidate	Votes	%
Republican	Lisa Torraco	12,092	51.81%
Democratic	Bill Tallman	11,248	48.19%
Total votes		23,340	100%
Republican hold			

=== District 19 ===
Incumbent Republican Sue Wilson Beffort has represented the 19th district since 1997.

New Mexico Senate 19th district general election, 2012
Party	Candidate	Votes	%
Republican	Sue Wilson Beffort (incumbent)	17,546	100%
Total votes		17,546	100%
Republican hold			

=== District 20 ===
Incumbent Republican William Payne has represented the 20th district since 1997.

New Mexico Senate 20th district general election, 2012
Party	Candidate	Votes	%
Republican	William Payne (incumbent)	13,626	56.13%
Democratic	Cornelia Lange	10,651	43.87%
Total votes		24,277	100%
Republican hold			

=== District 21 ===
Incumbent Democrat Lisa Curtis has represented the 21st district since her appointment in 2012 following the resignation of Republican Kent Cravens. Curtis lost re-election to Republican Mark Moores. Republican primary

New Mexico Senate 21st district Republican primary election, 2012
Party	Candidate	Votes	%
Republican	Mark Moores	2,020	49.88%
Republican	Robert Doughty III	1,186	29.28%
Republican	Nancy Cooper	844	20.84%
Total votes		4,050	100%

General election

New Mexico Senate 21st district general election, 2012
Party	Candidate	Votes	%
Republican	Mark Moores	14,067	56.64%
Democratic	Lisa Curtis (incumbent)	10,768	43.36%
Total votes		24,835	100%
Republican gain from Democratic			

=== District 22 ===
Incumbent Democrat Lynda Lovejoy has represented the 22nd district since 2007. Lovejoy lost re-nomination to fellow Democrat Benny Shendo, who was unopposed in the general election. Democratic primary

New Mexico Senate 22nd district Democratic primary election, 2012
Party	Candidate	Votes	%
Democratic	Benny Shendo	1,989	40.88%
Democratic	Lynda Lovejoy (incumbent)	1,776	36.50%
Democratic	Joshua Madalena	752	15.45%
Democratic	Anthony Begay	349	7.17%
Total votes		4,866	100%

General election

New Mexico Senate 22nd district general election, 2012
Party	Candidate	Votes	%
Democratic	Benny Shendo	12,051	100%
Total votes		12,051	100%
Democratic hold			

=== District 23 ===
Incumbent Republican Sander Rue has represented the 23rd district since 2009.

New Mexico Senate 23rd district general election, 2012
Party	Candidate	Votes	%
Republican	Sander Rue (incumbent)	14,327	100%
Total votes		14,327	100%
Republican hold			

=== District 24 ===
Incumbent Democrat Nancy Rodriguez has represented the 24th district since 1997.

New Mexico Senate 24th district general election, 2012
Party	Candidate	Votes	%
Democratic	Nancy Rodriguez (incumbent)	15,568	100%
Total votes		15,568	100%
Democratic hold			

=== District 25 ===
Incumbent Democrat Peter Wirth has represented the 25th district since 2009.

New Mexico Senate 25th district general election, 2012
Party	Candidate	Votes	%
Democratic	Peter Wirth (incumbent)	26,128	100%
Total votes		26,128	100%
Democratic hold			

=== District 26 ===
Incumbent Democrat Bernadette Sanchez has represented the 26th district since 2001. Sanchez didn't seek re-election and fellow Democrat Jacob Candelaria won the open seat. Democratic primary

New Mexico Senate 26th district general election, 2012
Party	Candidate	Votes	%
Democratic	Jacob Candelaria	1,835	68.91%
Democratic	Carlos Jose Villanueva	828	31.09%
Total votes		2,663	100%

General election

New Mexico Senate 26th district general election, 2012
Party	Candidate	Votes	%
Democratic	Jacob Candelaria	11,463	100%
Total votes		11,463	100%
Democratic hold			

=== District 27 ===
Incumbent Republican Minority Leader Stuart Ingle has represented the 27th district since 1985.

New Mexico Senate 27th district general election, 2012
Party	Candidate	Votes	%
Republican	Stuart Ingle (incumbent)	12,088	100%
Total votes		12,088	100%
Republican hold			

=== District 28 ===
Incumbent Democrat Howie Morales has represented the 28th district since 2009.

New Mexico Senate 28th district general election, 2012
Party	Candidate	Votes	%
Democratic	Howie Morales (incumbent)	15,702	100%
Total votes		15,702	100%
Democratic hold			

=== District 29 ===
Incumbent Democrat and Majority Leader Michael Sanchez has represented the 29th district since 1993.

New Mexico Senate 29th district general election, 2012
Party	Candidate	Votes	%
Democratic	Michael Sanchez (incumbent)	9,001	55.43%
Republican	David Chavez	7,237	44.57%
Total votes		16,238	100%
Democratic hold			

=== District 30 ===
Incumbent Democrat David Ulibarri has represented the 30th district since 2006. Ulibari lost re-nomination to fellow Democrat Clemente Sanchez, who went on to win the general election. Democratic primary

New Mexico Senate 30th district Democratic primary election, 2012
Party	Candidate	Votes	%
Democratic	Clemente Sanchez	1,235	31.08%
Democratic	Maxine Velasquez	1,226	30.85%
Democratic	David Ulibarri (incumbent)	889	22.37%
Democratic	Randolph Marshall Collins	624	15.70%
Total votes		3,974	100%

General election

New Mexico Senate 30th district general election, 2012
Party	Candidate	Votes	%
Democratic	Clemente Sanchez	8,844	53.03%
Republican	Vickie Perea	7,833	46.97%
Total votes		16,677	100%
Democratic hold			

=== District 31 ===
Incumbent Democrat Cynthia Nava has represented the 31st district since 1993. Nava didn't seek re-election and fellow Democrat Joe Cervantes won the open seat. Democratic primary

New Mexico Senate 31st district Democratic primary election, 2012
Party	Candidate	Votes	%
Democratic	Joe Cervantes	960	61.46%
Democratic	Jesus Ruben Segura	602	38.54%
Total votes		1,562	100%

General election

New Mexico Senate 31st district general election, 2012
Party	Candidate	Votes	%
Democratic	Joe Cervantes	7,513	68.26%
Republican	Brett Preston	3,493	31.74%
Total votes		11,006	100%
Democratic hold			

=== District 32 ===
Incumbent Democrat and President Pro Tempore Timothy Jennings has represented the 32nd district since 1979. Jennings lost re-election to Republican Cliff Pirtle. Republican primary

New Mexico Senate 32nd district Republican primary election, 2012
Party	Candidate	Votes	%
Republican	Cliff Pirtle	1,018	50.22%
Republican	Chad Hammill	1,009	49.78%
Total votes		2,027	100%

General election

New Mexico Senate 32nd district general election, 2012
Party	Candidate	Votes	%
Republican	Cliff Pirtle	5,930	52.26%
Democratic	Timothy Jennings (incumbent)	5,418	47.74%
Total votes		11,348	100%
Republican gain from Democratic			

=== District 33 ===
The new 33rd district includes the homes of incumbent Republicans Rod Adair, who has represented the 33rd district since 1997, and William Burt, who has represented the 40th district since 2011. Adair didn't seek re-election and Burt was re-elected here.

New Mexico Senate New Mexico Senate 33rd district general election, 2012
Party	Candidate	Votes	%
Republican	William Burt (incumbent)	12,292	65.31%
Democratic	Stephanie Dubois	6,530	34.69%
Total votes		18,822	100%
Republican hold			

=== District 34 ===
Incumbent Republican Vernon Asbill has represented the 34th district since 2005. Asbill didn't seek re-election and fellow Republican Ron Griggs won the open seat. Republican primary

New Mexico Senate 34th district Republican primary election, 2012
Party	Candidate	Votes	%
Republican	Ron Griggs	1,783	57.53%
Republican	Sarah Dion Kidd-Johnson	1,316	42.47%
Total votes		3,099	100%

General election

New Mexico Senate 34th district general election, 2012
Party	Candidate	Votes	%
Republican	Ron Griggs	9,647	67.67%
Democratic	Ellen Wedum	4,610	32.33%
Total votes		14,257	100%
Republican hold			

=== District 35 ===
Incumbent Democrat John Arthur Smith has represented the 35th district since 1989. Democratic primary

New Mexico Senate 35th district Democratic primary election, 2012
Party	Candidate	Votes	%
Democratic	John Arthur Smith (incumbent)	2,031	56.00%
Democratic	Larry Martinez	1,596	44.00%
Total votes		3,627	100%

General election

New Mexico Senate 35th district general election, 2012
Party	Candidate	Votes	%
Democratic	John Arthur Smith (incumbent)	10,446	60.97%
Republican	Russell Allen	6,688	39.03%
Total votes		17,134	100%
Democratic hold			

=== District 36 ===
Incumbent Democrat Mary Jane Garcia has represented the 36th district since 1989. Garcia lost re-election to Republican Lee Cotter. Democratic primary

New Mexico Senate 36th district Democratic primary election, 2012
Party	Candidate	Votes	%
Democratic	Mary Jane Garcia (incumbent)	1,355	57.98%
Democratic	Oscar Vasquez Butler	982	42.02%
Total votes		2,337	100%

General election

New Mexico Senate 36th district general election, 2012
Party	Candidate	Votes	%
Republican	Lee Cotter	9,146	53.89%
Democratic	Mary Jane Garcia (incumbent)	7,826	46.11%
Total votes		16,972	100%
Republican gain from Democratic			

=== District 37 ===
Incumbent Democrat Stephen Fischmann has represented the 37th district since 2009. Fischmann didn't seek re-election and fellow Democrat William Soules won the open seat.

New Mexico Senate 37th district general election, 2012
Party	Candidate	Votes	%
Democratic	William Soules	9,330	52.16%
Republican	Cathey Jo Alberson	8,557	47.84%
Total votes		17,887	100%
Democratic hold			

=== District 38 ===
Incumbent Democrat Mary Kay Papen has represented the 38th district since 2001.

New Mexico Senate 38th district general election, 2012
Party	Candidate	Votes	%
Democratic	Mary Kay Papen (incumbent)	9,464	66.43%
Republican	Neal Hooks	4,783	33.57%
Total votes		14,247	100%
Democratic hold			

=== District 39 ===
Incumbent Democrat Phil Griego has represented the 39th district since 1997. Democratic primary

New Mexico Senate 39th district Democratic primary election, 2012
Party	Candidate	Votes	%
Democratic	Phil Griego (incumbent)	1,884	43.55%
Democratic	Jack Sullivan	1,434	33.15%
Democratic	Nicole Castellano	1,008	23.30%
Total votes		4,326	100%

General election

New Mexico Senate 39th district general election, 2012
Party	Candidate	Votes	%
Democratic	Phil Griego (incumbent)	10,148	55.32%
Republican	Aubrey Dunn Jr.	8,195	44.68%
Total votes		18,343	100%
Democratic hold			

=== District 40 ===
The new 40th district is based in southwestern Sandoval County and includes much of Rio Rancho. The district has no incumbent. Republican Craig Brandt won the open seat. Republican primary

New Mexico Senate 40th district general election, 2012
Party	Candidate	Votes	%
Republican	Craig Brandt	1,363	62.18%
Republican	R. Morgan Braden	829	37.82%
Total votes		2,192	100%

General election

New Mexico Senate 40th district general election, 2012
Party	Candidate	Votes	%
Republican	Craig Brandt	9,982	55.30%
Democratic	Linda Allison	8,069	44.70%
Total votes		18,051	100%
Republican win (new seat)			

=== District 41 ===
Incumbent Republican Carroll Leavell has represented the 41st district since 1997.

New Mexico Senate 41st district general election, 2012
Party	Candidate	Votes	%
Republican	Carroll Leavell (incumbent)	8,413	100%
Total votes		8,413	100%
Republican hold			

=== District 42 ===
Incumbent Republican Gay Kernan has represented the th district since 2002.

New Mexico Senate 42nd district general election, 2012
Party	Candidate	Votes	%
Republican	Gay Kernan (incumbent)	14,414	100%
Total votes		14,414	100%
Republican hold			

== See also ==
- 2012 United States elections
- 2012 United States presidential election in New Mexico
- 2012 United States House of Representatives elections in New Mexico
- 2012 New Mexico House of Representatives election
