= 2016 New Mexico Senate election =

- November 8, 2016

All 42 seats in the New Mexico Senate 22 seats needed for a majority
	Majority party	Minority party
Leader	Mary Kay Papen	Stuart Ingle
Party	Democratic	Republican
Leader's seat	38th - Las Cruces	27th - Portales
Last election	25	17
Seats before	24 (Note: Democrat Phil Griego resigned his seat in March 2015. Republican Ted Barela was appointed to finish the balance of his term.)	18
Seats won	26	16
Seat change	▲2	▼2
Popular vote	399,912	271,028
Percentage	59.60%	40.40%
- Democratic gain Republican gain Democratic hold Republican hold 50–60% 60–70% >90% 50–60% 60–70% >90%
President pro tempore before election
Mary Kay Papen
Democratic
Elected President pro tempore
Mary Kay Papen
Democratic

The 2016 New Mexico Senate elections took place as part of the biennial United States elections. New Mexico voters elected state senators in all 42 of the state senate's districts. State senators serve four-year terms in the New Mexico Senate. The election coincided with elections for other offices, including for President, U.S House, and state house.

A primary election on June 7, 2016, determined which candidates appeared on the November 8th general election ballot.

== Results ==
District	Incumbent	Party	Elected senator	Party
1	William Sharer	Rep	William Sharer	Rep
2	Steven Neville	Rep	Steven Neville (Note: Unopposed in the November general election.)	Rep
3	John Pinto	Dem	John Pinto	Dem
4	George Muñoz	Dem	George Muñoz	Dem
5	Richard Martinez	Dem	Richard Martinez	Dem
6	Carlos Cisneros	Dem	Carlos Cisneros	Dem
7	Pat Woods	Rep	Pat Woods	Rep
8	Pete Campos	Dem	Pete Campos	Dem
9	John Sapien	Dem	John Sapien	Dem
10	John Ryan	Rep	Candace Gould	Rep
11	Linda Lopez	Dem	Linda Lopez	Dem
12	Jerry Ortiz y Pino	Dem	Jerry Ortiz y Pino	Dem
13	Bill O'Neill	Dem	Bill O'Neill	Dem
14	Michael Padilla	Dem	Michael Padilla	Dem
15	Daniel Ivey-Soto	Dem	Daniel Ivey-Soto	Dem
16	Cisco McSorley	Dem	Cisco McSorley	Dem
17	Mimi Stewart	Dem	Mimi Stewart	Dem
18	Lisa Torraco	Rep	Bill Tallman	Dem
19	James White	Rep	James White	Rep
20	William Payne	Rep	William Payne	Rep
21	Mark Moores	Rep	Mark Moores	Rep
22	Benny Shendo	Dem	Benny Shendo	Dem
23	Sander Rue	Rep	Sander Rue	Rep
24	Nancy Rodriguez	Dem	Nancy Rodriguez	Dem
25	Peter Wirth	Dem	Peter Wirth	Dem
26	Jacob Candelaria	Dem	Jacob Candelaria	Dem
27	Stuart Ingle	Rep	Stuart Ingle	Rep
28	Howie Morales	Dem	Howie Morales	Dem
29	Michael Sanchez	Dem	Gregory Baca	Rep
30	Clemente Sanchez	Dem	Clemente Sanchez	Dem
31	Joe Cervantes	Dem	Joe Cervantes	Dem
32	Cliff Pirtle	Rep	Cliff Pirtle	Rep
33	William Burt	Rep	William Burt	Rep
34	Ron Griggs	Rep	Ron Griggs	Rep
35	John Arthur Smith	Dem	John Arthur Smith	Dem
36	Lee Cotter	Rep	Jeff Steinborn	Dem
37	William Soules	Dem	William Soules	Dem
38	Mary Kay Papen	Dem	Mary Kay Papen	Dem
39	Ted Barela	Rep	Liz Stefanics	Dem
40	Craig Brandt	Rep	Craig Brandt	Rep
41	Carroll Leavell	Rep	Carroll Leavell	Rep
42	Gay Kernan	Rep	Gay Kernan	Rep

Party	Candi- dates	Votes		Seats		
Party	Candi- dates	No.	%	No.	+/–	%
Democratic	33	399,912	59.60%	26	▲2	61.90%
Republican	24	271,028	40.40%	16	▼2	38.10%
Total	57	670,940	100%	42	Steady	100%

Popular vote
Democratic	59.60%
Republican	40.40%

Senate seats
Democratic	61.90%
Republican	38.10%

== Retiring incumbents ==
- John Ryan (R-District 10)

== Defeated incumbents ==
- Lisa Torraco (R-District 13), defeated by Bill Tallman (D)
- Michael Sanchez (D-District 29), defeated by Gregory Baca (R)
- Lee Cotter (R-District 36), defeated by Jeff Steinborn (D)
- Ted Barela (R-District 39), defeated by Liz Stefanics (D)

== Predictions ==
Source	Ranking	As of
Governing	Lean D	October 12, 2016

== Detailed results ==
Source for primary election results: Source for general election results:

=== District 1 ===
Incumbent Republican William Sharer has represented the 1st district since 2001. Democratic primary

New Mexico Senate 1st District Democratic primary election, 2016
Party	Candidate	Votes	%
Democratic	Rebecca Morgan	984	64.23%
Democratic	Matt Dodson	548	35.77%
Total votes		1,532	100%

General election

New Mexico Senate 1st District general election, 2016
Party	Candidate	Votes	%
Republican	William Sharer (incumbent)	11,170	69.80%
Democratic	Rebecca Morgan	4,834	30.20%
Total votes		16,004	100%
Republican hold			

=== District 2 ===
Incumbent Republican Steven Neville has represented the 2nd district since 2005.

New Mexico Senate 2nd District general election, 2016
Party	Candidate	Votes	%
Republican	Steven Neville (incumbent)	15,057	100%
Total votes		15,057	100%
Republican hold			

=== District 3 ===
Incumbent Democrat John Pinto has represented the 3rd district since 20.

New Mexico Senate 3rd District general election, 2016
Party	Candidate	Votes	%
Democratic	John Pinto (incumbent)	12,519	100%
Total votes		12,519	100%
Democratic hold			

=== District 4 ===
Incumbent Democrat George Muñoz has represented the 4th district since 2009. Democratic primary

New Mexico Senate 4th District Democratic primary election, 2016
Party	Candidate	Votes	%
Democratic	George Muñoz (incumbent)	3,475	63.90%
Democratic	Felisha Adams	1,150	21.15%
Democratic	Jordon Johnson	813	14.95%
Total votes		5,438	100%

General election

New Mexico Senate 4th District general election, 2016
Party	Candidate	Votes	%
Democratic	George Muñoz (incumbent)	12,029	100%
Total votes		12,029	100%
Democratic hold			

=== District 5 ===
Incumbent Democrat Richard Martinez has represented the th district since 2001.

New Mexico Senate 5th District general election, 2016
Party	Candidate	Votes	%
Democratic	Richard Martinez (incumbent)	15,535	100%
Total votes		15,535	100%
Democratic hold			

=== District 6 ===
Incumbent Democrat Carlos Cisneros has represented the 6th district since 20.

New Mexico Senate 6th District general election, 2016
Party	Candidate	Votes	%
Democratic	Carlos Cisneros (incumbent)	17,697	100%
Total votes		17,697	100%
Democratic hold			

=== District 7 ===
Incumbent Republican Pat Woods has represented the 7th district since 2012.

New Mexico Senate 7th District general election, 2016
Party	Candidate	Votes	%
Republican	Pat Woods (incumbent)	12,778	100%
Total votes		12,778	100%
Republican hold			

=== District 8 ===
Incumbent Democrat Pete Campos has represented the 8th district since 1991.

New Mexico Senate 8th District general election, 2016
Party	Candidate	Votes	%
Democratic	Pete Campos (incumbent)	14,258	100%
Total votes		14,258	100%
Democratic hold			

=== District 9 ===
Incumbent Democrat John Sapien has represented the 9th district since 2009. Democratic primary

New Mexico Senate 9th District Democratic primary election, 2016
Party	Candidate	Votes	%
Democratic	John Sapien (incumbent)	3,878	61.56%
Democratic	Jodilynn Ortiz	2,422	38.44%
Total votes		6,300	100%

General election

New Mexico Senate 9th District general election, 2016
Party	Candidate	Votes	%
Democratic	John Sapien (incumbent)	12,724	50.38%
Republican	Diego Espinoza	12,534	49.62%
Total votes		25,258	100%
Democratic hold			

=== District 10 ===
Incumbent Republican John Ryan has represented the 10th district since 2005. Ryan didn't seek re-election. Fellow Republican Candace Gould narrowly won the open seat.

New Mexico Senate 10th District general election, 2016
Party	Candidate	Votes	%
Republican	Candace Gould	10,530	50.92%
Democratic	David Simon	10,151	49.08%
Total votes		20,681	100%
Republican hold			

=== District 11 ===
Incumbent Democrat Linda Lopez has represented the 11th district since 1997.

New Mexico Senate 11th District general election, 2016
Party	Candidate	Votes	%
Democratic	Linda Lopez (incumbent)	8,776	100%
Total votes		8,776	100%
Democratic hold			

=== District 12 ===
Incumbent Democrat Jerry Ortiz y Pino has represented the 12th district since 2005.

New Mexico Senate 12th District general election, 2016
Party	Candidate	Votes	%
Democratic	Jerry Ortiz y Pino (incumbent)	12,922	100%
Total votes		12,922	100%
Democratic hold			

=== District 13 ===
Incumbent Democrat Bill O'Neill has represented the 13th district since 2013.

New Mexico Senate 13th District general election, 2016
Party	Candidate	Votes	%
Democratic	Bill O'Neill (incumbent)	14,089	65.89%
Republican	A. Blair Dunn	7,294	34.11%
Total votes		21,383	100%
Democratic hold			

=== District 14 ===
Incumbent Democrat Michael Padilla has represented the 14th district since 2013.

New Mexico Senate 14th District general election, 2016
Party	Candidate	Votes	%
Democratic	Michael Padilla (incumbent)	9,668	100%
Total votes		9,668	100%
Democratic hold			

=== District 15 ===
Incumbent Democrat Daniel Ivey-Soto has represented the 15th district since 2013.

New Mexico Senate 15th District general election, 2016
Party	Candidate	Votes	%
Democratic	Daniel Ivey-Soto (incumbent)	11,321	55.76%
Republican	Eric Burton	8,981	44.24%
Total votes		20,302	100%
Democratic hold			

=== District 16 ===
Incumbent Democrat Cisco McSorley has represented the 16th district since 20.

New Mexico Senate 16th District general election, 2016
Party	Candidate	Votes	%
Democratic	Cisco McSorley (incumbent)	16,721	100%
Total votes		16,721	100%
Democratic hold			

=== District 17 ===
Incumbent Democrat Mimi Stewart has represented the 17th district since her appointment in 2015. Stewart was elected to a full term. Democratic primary

New Mexico Senate 17th District Democratic primary election, 2016
Party	Candidate	Votes	%
Democratic	Mimi Stewart (incumbent)	1,745	58.58%
Democratic	Shannon Robinson	1,234	41.42%
Total votes		2,979	100%

General election

New Mexico Senate 17th District general election, 2016
Party	Candidate	Votes	%
Democratic	Mimi Stewart (incumbent)	8,456	100%
Total votes		8,456	100%
Democratic hold			

=== District 18 ===
Incumbent Republican Lisa Torraco has represented the 18th district since 2013. She lost re-election to Democrat Bill Tallman.

New Mexico Senate 18th District general election, 2016
Party	Candidate	Votes	%
Democratic	Bill Tallman	12,203	50.95%
Republican	Lisa Torraco (incumbent)	11,750	49.05%
Total votes		23,953	100%
Democratic gain from Republican			

=== District 19 ===
Incumbent Republican James White has represented the 19th district since his appointment in 2016. Republican primary

New Mexico Senate 19th District Republican primary election, 2016
Party	Candidate	Votes	%
Republican	James White (incumbent)	2,431	51.43%
Republican	Anthony Linn Thornton	1,408	29.79%
Republican	James Roger Wilder	480	10.15%
Republican	Herb Gadberry	408	8.63%
Total votes		4,727	100%

General election

New Mexico Senate 19th District general election, 2016
Party	Candidate	Votes	%
Republican	James White (incumbent)	14,905	61.29%
Democratic	Harold Murphree	9,415	38.71%
Total votes		24,320	100%
Republican hold			

=== District 20 ===
Incumbent Republican William Payne has represented the 20th district since 1997.

New Mexico Senate 20th District general election, 2016
Party	Candidate	Votes	%
Republican	William Payne (incumbent)	16,893	100%
Total votes		16,893	100%
Republican hold			

=== District 21 ===
Incumbent Republican Mark Moores has represented the 21st district since 2013.

New Mexico Senate 21st District general election, 2016
Party	Candidate	Votes	%
Republican	Mark Moores (incumbent)	14,164	56.09%
Democratic	Gregory Frazier	11,087	43.91%
Total votes		25,251	100%
Republican hold			

=== District 22 ===
Incumbent Democrat Benny Shendo has represented the 22nd district since 2013. Democratic primary

New Mexico Senate 22nd District Democratic primary election, 2016
Party	Candidate	Votes	%
Democratic	Benny Shendo (incumbent)	3,554	63.17%
Democratic	Sandra Jeff	2,072	36.83%
Total votes		5,626	100%

General election

New Mexico Senate 22nd District general election, 2016
Party	Candidate	Votes	%
Democratic	Benny Shendo (incumbent)	12,472	100%
Total votes		12,472	100%
Democratic hold			

=== District 23 ===
Incumbent Republican Sander Rue has represented the 23rd district since 2009. Democratic primary

New Mexico Senate 23rd District Democratic primary election, 2016
Party	Candidate	Votes	%
Democratic	Joy Garratt	2,392	51.40%
Democratic	Joe Chavez	2,262	48.60%
Total votes		4,654	100%

General election

New Mexico Senate 23rd District general election, 2016
Party	Candidate	Votes	%
Republican	Sander Rue (incumbent)	11,794	51.74%
Democratic	Joy Garratt	11,001	48.26%
Total votes		22,795	100%
Republican hold			

=== District 24 ===
Incumbent Democrat Nancy Rodriguez has represented the 24th district since 1996.

New Mexico Senate 24th District general election, 2016
Party	Candidate	Votes	%
Democratic	Nancy Rodriguez (incumbent)	16,155	100%
Total votes		16,155	100%
Democratic hold			

=== District 25 ===
Incumbent Democratic Majority Leader Peter Wirth has represented the 25th district since 2009.

New Mexico Senate 25th District general election, 2016
Party	Candidate	Votes	%
Democratic	Peter Wirth (incumbent)	26,958	100%
Total votes		26,958	100%
Democratic hold			

=== District 26 ===
Incumbent Democrat Jacob Candelaria has represented the 26th district since 2013.

New Mexico Senate 26th District general election, 2016
Party	Candidate	Votes	%
Democratic	Jacob Candelaria (incumbent)	11,330	100%
Total votes		11,330	100%
Democratic hold			

=== District 27 ===
Incumbent Republican Minority Leader Stuart Ingle has represented the 27th district since 1985.

New Mexico Senate 27th District general election, 2016
Party	Candidate	Votes	%
Republican	Stuart Ingle (incumbent)	12,589	100%
Total votes		12,589	100%
Republican hold			

=== District 28 ===
Incumbent Democrat Howie Morales has represented the 28th district since 20.

New Mexico Senate 28th District general election, 2016
Party	Candidate	Votes	%
Democratic	Howie Morales (incumbent)	15,063	100%
Total votes		15,063	100%
Democratic hold			

=== District 29 ===
Incumbent Democrat Michael Sanchez has represented the 29th district since 1993. He lost re-election to Republican Gregory Baca.

New Mexico Senate 29th District general election, 2016
Party	Candidate	Votes	%
Republican	Gregory Baca	8,965	54.96%
Democratic	Michael Sanchez (incumbent)	7,348	45.04%
Total votes		16,313	100%
Republican gain from Democratic			

=== District 30 ===
Incumbent Democrat Clemente Sanchez has represented the 30th district since 2013.

New Mexico Senate 30th District general election, 2016
Party	Candidate	Votes	%
Democratic	Clemente Sanchez (incumbent)	11,973	100%
Total votes		11,973	100%
Democratic hold			

=== District 31 ===
Incumbent Democrat Joe Cervantes has represented the 31st district since 2012.

New Mexico Senate 31st District general election, 2016
Party	Candidate	Votes	%
Democratic	Joe Cervantes (incumbent)	9,443	100%
Total votes		9,443	100%
Democratic hold			

=== District 32 ===
Incumbent Republican Cliff Pirtle has represented the 32nd district since 2013.

New Mexico Senate 32nd District general election, 2016
Party	Candidate	Votes	%
Republican	Cliff Pirtle (incumbent)	8,480	100%
Total votes		8,480	100%
Republican hold			

=== District 33 ===
Incumbent Republican William Burt has represented the 33rd district and its predecessors since 2011.

New Mexico Senate New Mexico Senate 33rd District general election, 2016
Party	Candidate	Votes	%
Republican	William Burt (incumbent)	14,648	100%
Total votes		14,648	100%
Republican hold			

=== District 34 ===
Incumbent Republican Ron Griggs has represented the 34th district since 2012.

New Mexico Senate 34th District general election, 2016
Party	Candidate	Votes	%
Republican	Ron Griggs (incumbent)	11,542	100%
Total votes		11,542	100%
Republican hold			

=== District 35 ===
Incumbent Democrat John Arthur Smith has represented the 35th district since 1989.

New Mexico Senate 35th District general election, 2016
Party	Candidate	Votes	%
Democratic	John Arthur Smith (incumbent)	12,502	100%
Total votes		12,502	100%
Democratic hold			

=== District 36 ===
Incumbent Republican Lee Cotter has represented the 36th district since 2013. He lost re-election to Democrat Jeff Steinborn. Democratic primary

New Mexico Senate 36th District Democratic primary election, 2016
Party	Candidate	Votes	%
Democratic	Jeff Steinborn	2,952	65.48%
Democratic	Oscar Vasquez Butler	1,556	34.52%
Total votes		4,508	100%

General election

New Mexico Senate 36th District general election, 2016
Party	Candidate	Votes	%
Democratic	Jeff Steinborn	10,579	59.64%
Republican	Lee Cotter (incumbent)	7,158	40.36%
Total votes		17,737	100%
Democratic gain from Republican			

=== District 37 ===
Incumbent Democrat William Soules has represented the 37th district since 2013.

New Mexico Senate 37th District general election, 2016
Party	Candidate	Votes	%
Democratic	William Soules (incumbent)	11,374	55.47%
Republican	Cecelia Levatino	9,131	44.53%
Total votes		20,505	100%
Democratic hold			

=== District 38 ===
Incumbent Democrat President Pro Tempore Mary Kay Papen has represented the 38th district since 2001.

New Mexico Senate 38th District general election, 2016
Party	Candidate	Votes	%
Democratic	Mary Kay Papen (incumbent)	9,588	67.04%
Republican	Charles Wendler	4,713	32.96%
Total votes		14,301	100%
Democratic hold			

=== District 39 ===
Incumbent Republican Ted Barela has represented the 39th district since his appointment on April 3, 2015. He ran for re-election to a full term, but he was defeated for re-election by Democrat Liz Stefanics. Democratic primary

New Mexico Senate 39th District Democratic primary election, 2016
Party	Candidate	Votes	%
Democratic	Liz Stefanics	2,377	38.38%
Democratic	Mike Dale Anaya	1,398	22.57%
Democratic	Ambrose Castellano	1,298	20.96%
Democratic	Hugh Ley	1,120	18.08%
Total votes		6,193	100%

General election

New Mexico Senate 39th District general election, 2016
Party	Candidate	Votes	%
Democratic	Liz Stefanics	9,622	50.99%
Republican	Ted Barela (incumbent)	9,250	49.01%
Total votes		18,872	100%
Democratic gain from Republican			

=== District 40 ===
Incumbent Republican Craig Brandt has represented the 40th district since 2013.

New Mexico Senate 40th District general election, 2016
Party	Candidate	Votes	%
Republican	Craig Brandt (incumbent)	12,490	55.29%
Democratic	Linda Sanchez Allison	10,099	44.71%
Total votes		22,589	100%
Republican hold			

=== District 41 ===
Incumbent Republican Carroll Leavell has represented the 41st district since 1997.

New Mexico Senate 41st District general election, 2016
Party	Candidate	Votes	%
Republican	Carroll Leavell (incumbent)	9,006	100%
Total votes		9,006	100%
Republican hold			

=== District 42 ===
Incumbent Republican Gay Kernan has represented the th district since 2002.

New Mexico Senate 42nd District general election, 2016
Party	Candidate	Votes	%
Republican	Gay Kernan (incumbent)	15,206	100%
Total votes		15,206	100%
Republican hold			

== See also ==
- 2016 New Mexico elections
- 2016 United States elections
- 2016 United States presidential election in New Mexico
- 2016 United States House of Representatives elections in New Mexico
- 2016 New Mexico House of Representatives election
