= List of New Mexico State University people =

This is a list of notable people affiliated with New Mexico State University.

== Faculty and staff ==
- Reta Beebe - professor emeritus in the Astronomy Department, best known for participation in the Voyager mission
- David Boje - author; current NMSU endowed Bank of America professor of management
- Garrey Carruthers - former NMSU president and dean of College of Business; former governor of New Mexico
- James Cuffey - former professor in astronomy, known for photoelectric photometry
- Frank Harary - mathematician, specialized in graph theory
- Lou Henson - former NMSU basketball head coach
- Brandon Hobson - author; National Book Award finalist
- Delano Lewis - founding director of New Mexico State University's International Relations Institute
- Mark Medoff - playwright, screenwriter, film and theatre director, actor, and professor
- Antonya Nelson - English professor at NMSU; author
- Cyrus Nowrasteh - screenwriter and director
- Gerald W. Thomas - NMSU president emeritus, 1970–1984
- Edward O. Thorp - mathematician best known for writing the book Beat the Dealer and co-inventing the first wearable computer; associate professor of Mathematics 1961–65
- Clyde Tombaugh - astronomer best known for his discovery of Pluto; former professor of astronomy
- Frank Alan Ward - Distinguished Professor in the College of Agriculture, Consumer, and Environmental Science; 2022 DARE Hall of Fame Award; Colorado State University: Lifetime Achievement Award, 2022
- James McAteer - NMSU Deputy Provost, and Professor of Astrophysics

== Alumni ==
=== Science, medicine, and technology ===
- Arlan Andrews - mechanical engineer and science fiction author
- Joy Lim Arthur - first woman engineer at White Sands Missile Range
- John A. D. Cooper - physician and educator
- Alan Hale - astronomer famous for discovering the Hale-Bopp Comet
- Bill Inmon - computer scientist, recognized as the father of the data warehouse
- Paul W. Klipsch - audio pioneer; founder of Klipsch and Associates; namesake of the Klipsch School of Electrical and Computer Engineering at NMSU
- Jaron Lanier - writer, computer scientist, composer, and virtual reality pioneer
- Kathy Lueders - engineer, NASA associate administrator of Human Exploration and Operations (HEO)
- Rose Marie Pangborn - scientist, pioneer in the sensory analysis of food
- Stuart Pimm - theoretical ecologist and conservation biologist
- Harold Reitsema - astronomer, part of the teams that discovered Larissa and Telesto
- Mark W. Spong - roboticist; dean of Erik Jonsson School of Engineering & Computer Science at the University of Texas at Dallas
- Paul Carpenter Standley - botanist
- Sarah Stewart - research scientist, pioneer in the field of viral oncology, co-discovered the first polyomavirus

=== Law, politics, military and government ===
- Norma Bixby - member of the Montana House of Representatives
- Donald Bratton - politician
- William Burt - Republican member of the New Mexico Senate
- Brian Colón - former New Mexico State Auditor and former chairman of the Democratic Party of New Mexico, current attorney
- Michael L. Connor - United States deputy secretary of the Interior
- David Coss - US politician and former mayor of Santa Fe, New Mexico
- Lee Cotter - Republican member of the New Mexico Senate
- Candy Ezzell - Republican member of the New Mexico House of Representatives
- Edgar Franklin Foreman, Jr. - motivational speaker in Dallas who served one term in the United States House of Representatives
- Gregory J. Fouratt - former United States attorney for the District of New Mexico
- Chuck Franco - game warden, police officer, undersheriff, current First Gentleman of New Mexico
- Mary Helen Garcia - Democratic member of the New Mexico House of Representatives
- Mary Jane Garcia - former member of the New Mexico Senate
- Ron Griggs - politician
- David Campos Guaderrama - United States district judge for the United States District Court for the Western District of Texas
- Gary King - attorney general of New Mexico
- Greg Lopez - U.S. representative from Colorado
- Lester Lyles - former Air Force general, chairman of the board for USAA
- Patrick H. Lyons - politician from New Mexico
- John McEneny - politician
- Ken Miyagishima - mayor of Las Cruces, New Mexico
- Howie Morales - Democratic member of the New Mexico Senate
- Steven Neville - Republican member of the New Mexico Senate
- Steve Pearce - US representative for New Mexico
- Renee Schulte - Iowa state representative
- William Sharer - Republican member of the New Mexico Senate
- Roosevelt Skerrit - prime minister of Dominica; attended but graduated from Mississippi
- William Soules - Democratic member of the New Mexico Senate
- James Edward Wharton - United States Army brigadier general, killed in action during World War II
- Pat Woods - Republican member of the New Mexico Senate
- Bob Wooley - Republican member of the New Mexico House of Representatives
- Aneva J. Yazzie - CEO of Navajo Housing Authority

=== Business ===
- Kevin Johnson - CEO of Starbucks Corporation
- Dave Lopez - telecommunications executive

=== Academia, arts, and literature ===
- Lee K. Abbott - writer; professor emeritus of English at Ohio State University
- Subhankar Banerjee - photographer, author and activist
- Denise Chavez - author, playwright and stage director
- Upile Chisala - poet
- Leroy Quintana - poet, Vietnam veteran
- Larry Torres - linguist and lecturer on Southwestern culture
- Martin Guevara Urbina - writer, professor, and researcher; as a sociologist and criminologist, works on Latina and Latino issues in the United States

=== Athletics ===
- Willie Adams - former NFL defensive end
- Andre Anderson - former CFL defensive tackle for the BC Lions
- Pervis Atkins - NFL running back, played for the Los Angeles Rams, Washington Redskins and Oakland Raiders
- Leo Barker - NFL linebacker, played for the Cincinnati Bengals
- Greg Bearman - CFL defensive back
- Rich Beem - professional golfer with a three PGA Tour wins including 2002 PGA Championship
- Jim Bostic - NBA forward
- Randy Brown - NBA guard
- Bart Bryant - professional golfer with three PGA Tour wins
- Tom Byrum - professional golfer with one PGA Tour win
- Joe Campbell - NFL defensive end, played for the New Orleans Saints, Oakland Raiders and Tampa Bay Buccaneers
- Steve Colter - NBA guard
- Charlie Criss - NBA guard
- Andy Dorris - NFL defensive end, played for the St. Louis Cardinals, New Orleans Saints, Seattle Seahawks and Houston Oilers
- Andre Francis - former FL defensive back
- Bob Gaiters - NFL running back, played for the NY Giants, San Francisco 49ers and Denver Broncos
- Roy Gerela - NFL placekicker, played for the Houston Oilers, Pittsburgh Steelers and San Diego Chargers
- Jim Germany - CFL running back, played for the Edmonton Eskimos, was an All-Star and part of 5 Grey Cup championship teams
- Jonte Green - NFL cornerback for the Detroit Lions
- Duriel Harris - NFL wide receiver, played for the Miami Dolphins
- Steve Haskins - professional golfer with two Web.com Tour wins
- Lou Henson - former coach of New Mexico State and University of Illinois men's basketball
- Davon House - NFL defensive back for the Green Bay Packers
- Bobby Humphrey - NFL wide receiver, played for the NY Jets and Denver Broncos
- Martin Iti - basketball player
- Bob Jackson - former NFL running back
- Charley Johnson - NFL quarterback, played for the St. Louis Cardinals, Houston Oilers and Denver Broncos; full professor of Chemical Engineering at NMSU; member of the Denver Broncos Ring of Honor
- Walter Johnson - NFL defensive lineman, played for the Cleveland Browns and Cincinnati Bengals; three-time Pro Bowl (1967, 1968, 1969); member of the College Football Hall of Fame
- LaTraia Jones - football coach; former player at University of Wyoming
- Reggie Jordan - NBA guard
- Sam Lacey - NBA center
- Billy Ray Locklin - former CFL defensive lineman
- Kerry Locklin - college football coach
- Denvis Manns - football running back, famous for rushing for 1,000 yards in four consecutive seasons in college
- Samy Natera Jr. - Mexican baseball player in the Los Angeles Angels organization
- Kyle Nelson - NFL long snapper
- Michael New - former basketball player and coach of the Milton Keynes Lions
- Jerry Nuzum - NFL running back, played for the Pittsburgh Steelers
- Cliff Olander - gridiron football quarterback
- J. R. Patton - stock car racing driver
- Buck Pierce - CFL quarterback, played for the BC Lions and Winnipeg Blue Bombers
- Joe Pisarcik - NFL quarterback, played for the New York Giants and Philadelphia Eagles; best remembered for his role in a 1978 play that has since been referred to as "The Fumble" by NY Giants fans and "The Miracle at the Meadowlands" by Philadelphia Eagles fans
- Ron Porterfield - Major League Baseball athletic trainer
- Tony Sanchez - head football coach at UNLV
- Joe Schmiesing - former NFL defensive lineman, played for the St. Louis Cardinals
- Siddeeq Shabazz - Canadian Football League linebacker
- Alena Sharp - professional golfer on the LPGA Tour
- Pascal Siakam - NBA forward, NBA championship in 2019 with Toronto Raptors
- Jannah Sonnenschein (born 1996) - Dutch-Mozambican swimmer
- Danny Villanueva - NFL placekicker, played for the Los Angeles Rams and Dallas Cowboys; media entertainment entrepreneur
- Gary Ward - former baseball coach for Oklahoma State University and New Mexico State University
- Walt Williams - NFL cornerback, played for the Detroit Lions, Minnesota Vikings and Chicago Bears
- John Williamson - NBA guard
- Tony Wragge - former NFL offensive lineman for various teams
- Fredd Young - NFL linebacker; played for the Seattle Seahawks and Indianapolis Colts; four-time Pro Bowler (1984, 1985, 1986, 1987); two-time All-Pro (1984, 1987); member of the Seattle Seahawks 35th anniversary team
- Jahmar Young (born 1986) - basketball player in the Israeli National League

=== Entertainment, film, news and television ===
- Scott Bailey - actor
- Baxter Black - cowboy poet; radio and television commentator
- Kira Davis - film producer
- William Frankfather - actor
- Barbara Funkhouser - journalist, first woman to serve as editor of the El Paso Times (1980–1986)
- Franc Luz - movie and television actor
- Alvy Ray Smith - co-founder of Pixar
- Brittany Toll - Miss New Mexico 2011

=== Other ===
- Jorge A. Rojas - general authority of The Church of Jesus Christ of Latter-day Saints (LDS Church)
- Clara Belle Williams (1885–1994) - first African-American graduate of the university (English, 1937)
