= List of University of New Mexico faculty =

This is a list of past and present faculty members at the University of New Mexico.

- Sophie Bledsoe Aberle
- Nasir Ahmed, inventor of the discrete cosine transform
- Rudolfo Anaya, author of Bless Me, Ultima; professor of English
- Edward Angel
- George Anselevicius
- Timothy App
- Archie J. Bahm
- Arthur Bankhurst
- James R. Barker
- Bob Barney, professor and Olympic scholar
- Keith H. Basso
- Norman Bay
- Carol Bergé
- Louie Croft Boyd, nursing
- James Brown, biology professor; coined the term "macroecology"; member of the National Academy of Sciences
- Bainbridge Bunting
- Joan Bybee
- Gregory Cajete
- Eric Charnov
- Lena Clauve
- Van Deren Coke
- Michael Conniff
- David Correia
- William Croft
- Helen Damico
- David King Dunaway
- Lois Duncan
- Bradley Ellingboe
- Christie G. Enke
- Bill Evans
- Robert E. Fleming, professor emeritus of English known for his work related to the literary criticism of Ernest Hemingway; co-edited (with Robert W. Lewis) an edition of Hemingway's Under Kilimanjaro
- Stephanie Forrest
- Christian G. Fritz
- Murray Gell-Mann, 1994, professor of physics; winner of 1969 Nobel Prize in Physics for his work on the theory of elementary particles
- Byrd Gibbens, English professor
- Laura E. Gómez
- María Dolores Gonzáles, associate professor of Elementary Education
- Robert E. Haebel, Naval Reserve Officers Training Corps instructor decorated with the Bronze Star Medal and Purple Heart for combat during the Korean War and Vietnam War and promoted to United States Marine Corps major general commanding the 3rd Marine Division
- Frederick Hammersley
- Fred R. Harris (1930–2024), professor of political science and former Democratic U.S. senator from Oklahoma (1964–1976)
- Carl S. Hawkins
- Florence Hawley
- Richard Hayes
- Jane E. Henney
- M. Miriam Herrera
- Reuben Hersh
- Frank C. Hibben, anthropology professor noted for locating artifacts of Paleo-Indians
- Tony Hillerman, author of detective novels, professor of journalism
- James D. Hollan
- Paul Andrew Hutton
- Mari-Luci Jaramillo
- Raymond Jonson
- Rebecca W. Keller
- Clyde Kluckhohn
- Enrique Lamadrid, professor emeritus of the Department of Spanish and Portuguese, Chicano Hispano Mexicano Studies
- Louise Lamphere
- Lincoln LaPaz
- Larry Lavender
- Luke Fleet Lester
- L. Luis Lopez
- Steven Loza
- Ian Maddieson
- Edward Mazria
- Mark McKnight
- Geoffrey Miller
- Cleve Moler
- David Montejano
- Cristopher Moore
- Kęstutis Nakas
- Beaumont Newhall
- Anne Noggle
- Diana Northup, geomicrobiologist
- Stuart Novins
- Chris Offutt
- Alfonso Ortiz, Native-American cultural anthropologist
- Adrian Oțoiu
- Michaele Pride-Wells, architect
- Bill Redmond
- Herbert H. Reynolds
- Everett Rogers
- Jay Rubenstein
- Jeffrey Burton Russell
- Roger Sanders
- Suellyn Scarnecchia
- Tony F. Schneider, professor of naval science awarded two Navy Crosses and three Distinguished Flying Crosses flying dive bombers during the Battle of Midway, Solomon Islands campaign, Battle of Iwo Jima, Battle of Okinawa, and bombing raids over Japan
- Zachary Sharp
- Raychael Stine
- David E. Stuart
- Joseph Tainter
- Cristina Takacs-Vesbach, Antarctic researcher, microbial ecologist
- Iain Thomson, professor of Philosophy; received the UNM College of Arts and Sciences' Gunter Starkey Teaching Award UNM Gunter Starkey Award for Teaching Excellence and a National Endowment for the Humanities Research Fellowship; featured in Tao Ruspoli's film Being in the World
- Mauricio Tohen, Distinguished Professor, and chairman of the Department of Psychiatry & Behavioral Sciences
- Larry Torres, former associate professor of Foreign Languages and head of the Fine Arts and Culture Department
- Michael Trujillo, physician and director of the Indian Health Service
- Marilyn Tyler, director of Opera Studies 1983–2011; sung with many of the world's best orchestras and opera companies
- Kevin K. Washburn
- Wirt H. Wills
- Terry Yates, biology and pathology professor; credited with discovering the source of the hantavirus in 1993
- Joni J. Young
- Robert W. Young
