= Senator Griego =

Senator Griego may refer to:

- Eric Griego (born 1966), New Mexico State Senate
- Phil Griego (born 1948), New Mexico State Senate
