= Senator Barela =

Senator Barela may refer to:

- Casimiro Barela (1847–1920), Colorado State Senate
- Ted Barela (2000s–2010s), New Mexico State Senate
