= Clinton Harden =

American politician (1947–2025)

Member of the New Mexico Senate from the 7th district
- In office 2003–2012
- Preceded by: Patrick Lyons
- Succeeded by: Pat Woods

Personal details
- Born: Clinton Dewey Harden Jr. April 12, 1947 Belen, New Mexico, U.S.
- Died: October 18, 2025 (aged 78) Clovis, New Mexico, U.S.
- Party: Republican
- Spouse: Kathrine Hope Rexroat (m. 1968)
- Occupation: Business administrator

Clinton Dewey Harden Jr. (April 12, 1947 – October 18, 2025) was an American politician. He was a Republican member of the New Mexico Senate from 2002 to 2012. An alumnus of the United States Naval Academy and the University of Utah, he was a business administrator.

== Life and career ==
Harden was born on April 12, 1947. He played college football for the Utah Utes and Navy Midshipmen.

Prior to serving in the New Mexico Senate, Harden served as the state's Secretary of Labor under Governor Gary Johnson. He chose not to run for reelection to the state senate following the end of his term in 2012.

Harden died on October 18, 2025, at the age of 78.
