= James Taylor (New Mexico politician) =

American politician from New Mexico

Member of the New Mexico Senate from the 14th district
- In office January 1, 2005 – January 1, 2009
- Preceded by: Manny Aragon
- Succeeded by: Eric Griego

Member of the New Mexico House of Representatives from the 12th district
- In office January 1, 1995 – January 1, 2005
- Succeeded by: Ernest Chavez

Personal details
- Born: February 5, 1966 (age 60)
- Party: Democratic
- Education: University of Virginia
- Profession: Educator, business owner

James G. Taylor (born February 5, 1966) is an American politician who served as a member of the New Mexico House of Representatives for the 12th district from 1994 through 2004 and New Mexico Senate for the 14th district from 2004 to 2008.

== Career ==
Taylor was elected to the New Mexico House of Representatives in 1994. In 2004, Taylor was appointed to the New Mexico Senate. In 2008 he was defeated for re-election in the Democratic primary by Eric Griego, a member of the Albuquerque City Council. After losing the primary, he filed a lawsuit to overturn the results of the election. In 2012, Taylor ran for his old seat. He placed third in the Democratic primary after Eleanor Chavez and eventual winner Michael Padilla.

== Electoral history ==
=== 2012 ===
New Mexico Senate 14th district Democratic primary election, 2012
Party	Candidate	Votes	%
Democratic	Michael Padilla	1,065	40.54%
Democratic	Eleanor Chavez	798	30.38%
Democratic	James Taylor	764	29.08%
Total votes		2,627	100%

=== 2008 ===
New Mexico Senate 14th district Democratic primary election, 2008
Party	Candidate	Votes	%
Democratic	Eric Griego	2,111	62.36%
Democratic	James Taylor (incumbent)	1,274	37.64%
Total votes		3,385	100%

=== 2004 ===
New Mexico Senate 14th district general election, 2004
Party	Candidate	Votes	%
Democratic	James Taylor	6,823	54.09%
Republican	Fernando De Baca	4,677	37.08%
Independent	Kathleen Ann Sabo	890	7.06%
Independent	Alfred Bennett III	223	1.77%
Total votes		12,613	100%
Democratic hold			
