= Georgene Louis =

American politician

Member of the New Mexico House of Representatives from the 26th district
- In office January 15, 2013 – January 1, 2023
- Preceded by: Al Park
- Succeeded by: Eleanor Chávez

Personal details
- Born: 1978 (age 47–48) Acoma Pueblo, New Mexico, U.S.
- Party: Democratic
- Education: University of New Mexico (BA, JD)
- Website: Government website

Georgene Louis (born 1978) is an American attorney and politician who served as a member of the New Mexico House of Representatives for the 26th district from 2013 to 2023.

== Early life and education ==
Louis was born and raised in the Acoma Pueblo. She earned a bachelor's degree and Juris Doctor from the University of New Mexico.

== Career ==
Louis has worked in the field of tribal law. She participated in a seven-month candidate training called Emerge New Mexico. Five of its alumni were elected to office in New Mexico in 2012. In 2015, Louis was one of five Native American legislators serving in the New Mexico House of Representatives.

Louis represented District 26, which includes part of West Albuquerque and is predominantly Latino. The district has a population of around 30,000 people, of whom 4% are Native American.

She was the chair of the House State Government, Elections, and Indian Affairs committees and was also a member of the Judiciary and Rules & Order of Business Committees. She was re-elected to a fifth term in 2020.

Louis is the general counsel of the Pueblo of Tesuque. On January 4, 2021, Louis announced her candidacy for the 2021 New Mexico's 1st congressional district special election. At the Democratic committee selection, she lost to fellow representative Melanie Stansbury.

After completing her existing term as representative for District 26, Louis elected not to run for re-election.

== Personal life ==
Louis had her daughter when she was a sophomore in high school. As of 2021, they lived in Albuquerque, New Mexico.

On February 14, 2022, Louis was booked into a Santa Fe County jail on an Aggravated DWI charge, in addition to being charged with "speeding, driving without insurance and failing to show proof of registration." In June 2022, Louis pleaded no contest to one charge of DWI. The other charges were dropped. She was sentenced to 24 hours of community service. Additionally, Louis also must comply with drug and alcohol screening, attend an education program on DWI laws, and install an ignition interlock device in her vehicle.

On April 4, 2022, New Mexico's State Ethics Commission ruled that Louis broke the New Mexico's Governmental Conduct Act by informing the arresting officer that she was a Legislator, and showing him her Government vehicle plates and that this was an attempt to obtain preferential treatment from a police officer. She agreed to pay $250, equivalent to a civil fine, in order to prevent answering the charge in court.

== Honors ==
- Inaugural Achievement Award, Indian Law Section, State Bar of New Mexico, 2013 (cite for this and following entries)
- Emerging Democratic Woman of the Year, Emerge New Mexico, 2013
- Toll Fellow, Council of State Governments, 2013
- 40 Under Forty Honoree, Albuquerque Business First, 2013
- Award Nominee, American Council of Young Political Leaders, 2013

== See also ==
- List of Native American politicians
- Native American women in politics

New Mexico House of Representatives
Preceded by Al Park	Member of the New Mexico House from the 26th district 2013–2023	Succeeded by Eleanor Chavez
