= Patricia Roybal Caballero =

American politician

Member of the New Mexico House of Representatives from the 13th district
- Incumbent
- Assumed office January 15, 2013
- Preceded by: Eleanor Chávez

Personal details
- Born: 1949 or 1950 (age 75–76)
- Party: Democratic
- Spouse: R. Carlos Caballero
- Children: 2
- Education: University of Colorado Boulder (BA); University of New Mexico (MPA, MURP)
- Website: Government website

Patricia A. Roybal Caballero (born 1949/1950) is an American politician serving as a member of the New Mexico House of Representatives from the 13th district. Elected in 2012, she assumed office on January 15, 2013.

== Education ==
Roybal Caballero earned a Bachelor of Arts degree from the University of Colorado Boulder and a dual Master of Public Administration–Master of Community and Regional Planning from the University of New Mexico.

== Career ==
Roybal Caballero is a member of Piro-Manso-Tiwa tribal faction and belongs to the Guadalupe Pueblo in New Mexico. She is one of two Native American women elected to the state legislature in 2012.

== Personal life ==
Roybal Caballero is married to R. Carlos Caballero, the New Mexico public education commissioner for the 1st district. She has two sons.

== Elections ==
2012

When District 13 incumbent Democratic representative Eleanor Chávez ran for the New Mexico Senate and left the seat open, Roybal Caballero was unopposed for the June 5, 2012 Democratic primary, winning with 834 votes, She won the November 6, 2012 general election with 4,452 votes (71.5%) against Republican nominee Jose Orozco.

2021

After the resignation of Deb Haaland, who resigned after being nominated by Joe Biden to become the United States Secretary of the Interior, Roybal Caballero announced her candidacy for congress from New Mexico's 1st congressional district. At the Democratic committee selection, she came in last place earning only one vote; fellow representative Melanie Stansbury would go on to win the nomination.

== See also ==
- List of Native American politicians
- Native American women in politics

New Mexico House of Representatives
Preceded by Eleanor Chavez	Member of the New Mexico House from the 13th district 2013–present	Incumbent
