= Candy Ezzell =

American politician (born 1953)

Member of the New Mexico House of Representatives from the 58th district
- In office January 2005 – December 31, 2024
- Preceded by: Pauline Ponce
- Succeeded by: Angelita Mejia

Member of the New Mexico Senate from the 32nd district
- Incumbent
- Assumed office January 1, 2025
- Preceded by: Cliff Pirtle

Personal details
- Born: November 26, 1953 (age 72) Artesia, New Mexico, U.S.
- Party: Republican
- Education: Eastern New Mexico University; New Mexico State University

Candy Spence Ezzell (born November 26, 1953) is an American politician who has served as a Republican member New Mexico Legislature since 2005. She represented the 58th district in the New Mexico House of Representatives from 2005 to 2024, and has represented the 32nd district in the New Mexico Senate since 2025.

== Education ==
Ezzell attended Eastern New Mexico University and New Mexico State University.

== Elections ==
- 2012 Ezzell and returning 2006 Democratic challenger Pablo Martinez were both unopposed for their June 5, 2012, primaries, setting up a rematch; Ezzell won the November 6, 2012, general election with 3,888 votes (62%) against Martinez.
- 2004 To challenge District 58 incumbent Democratic Representative Pauline Ponce, Ezzell was unopposed for the June 1, 2004, Republican Primary, winning with 271 votes and won the three-way November 2, 2004, general election with 3,632 votes (54.6%) against Representative Ponce and Libertarian candidate George Peterson.
- 2006 Ezzell was unopposed for the June 6, 2006, Republican Primary, winning with 591 votes and won the November 7, 2006, general election with 2,619 votes (54.1%) against Democratic nominee Pablo Martinez.
- 2008 Ezzell and returning 2004 opponent George Peterson, running as a Democrat, were both unopposed for their June 8, 2008, primaries, setting up a rematch; Ezzell won the November 4, 2008, general election with 4,208 votes (61.6%) against Peterson.
- 2010 Ezzell was unopposed for the June 1, 2010, Republican Primary, winning with 925 votes and won the November 2, 2010, general election with 3,036 votes (64.9%) against Democratic nominee Michael Trujillo.
