= Eleanor Chávez =

American politician

Member of the New Mexico House of Representatives
- Incumbent
- Assumed office January 1, 2023
- Preceded by: Georgene Louis
- Constituency: 26th district
- In office 2009–2013
- Succeeded by: Patricia Roybal Caballero
- Constituency: 13th district

Member of the New Mexico Public Education Commission
- In office 2014–2016

Personal details
- Born: June 30, 1953 (age 73) Las Cruces, New Mexico, U.S.
- Party: Democratic
- Education: University of Washington (BA, MSW)

Eleanor Chávez (born July 30, 1953) is an American politician serving as a member of the New Mexico House of Representatives for the 26th district. She previously represented the 13th district in the House from 2009 to 2013.

== Early life and education ==
Chávez was born in Las Cruces, New Mexico. She earned a Bachelor of Arts from the University of Washington and a Master of Social Work from the University of Washington School of Social Work.

== Career ==
After earning her master's degree, Chávez returned to New Mexico, where she worked as a community organizer. From 1997 to 2008, she was the director of the National Union of Hospital and Health Care Employee. In 2008, she was elected to the New Mexico House of Representatives for the 13th district. In 2012, she opted not to seek re-election and instead run for the New Mexico Senate. In the 2012 Democratic primary, Chávez placed second after incumbent Michael Padilla.

In 2014, Chávez was elected to the New Mexico Public Education Commission. She declined to seek re-election in 2016. After leaving office, Chávez resumed working for the National Union of Hospital and Health Care Employee as chapter director. In 2022, she was again elected to the New Mexico House of Representatives.
