= Zachary Sharp =

American geochemist

Zachary D. Sharp is an American stable isotope geochemist. He is credited with the development of laser-based technology for measuring oxygen isotopes in silicates and oxides. His contributions include laser analyses of meteorites, paleoclimate reconstruction by oxygen and hydrogen isotope ratios, and analysis of isotopic composition of volcanoes, fossils, and forensic samples.

He received a PhD from the University of Michigan in 1987, under the supervision of Eric J. Essene, followed by postdoctoral work at the Carnegie Institution for Science Geophysical Laboratory. From 1989 to 1998 he worked as a senior research scientist at the Institut de Mineralogie at the University of Lausanne. Since 2002, he has been on faculty at the Department of Earth and Planetary Sciences at the University of New Mexico.

Sharp received the title of Regents' Professor in 2008. He is a recipient of the Alexander von Humboldt Prize in Earth sciences. He is an associate editor of the American Journal of Science.
