= Jacob Candelaria =

American politician and attorney

- Candelaria in 2014

Member of the New Mexico Senate from the 26th district
- In office 2013 – October 19, 2022
- Preceded by: Bernadette Sanchez
- Succeeded by: Moe Maestas

Personal details
- Born: Jacob Rodney Candelaria; 1986 or 1987 (age 39–40) Albuquerque, New Mexico, U.S.
- Party: Democratic (until 2021); Independent (2021–present)
- Spouse: Kory Tillery
- Education: Princeton University (AB); University of New Mexico (JD)

Jacob Rodney Candelaria (born 1987) is an American politician and attorney who served as a member of the New Mexico Senate for the 26th district from 2013 to 2022. First elected in 2012 as a Democrat, he later left the party in 2021 to become an independent.

On December 6, 2021, Candelaria announced that he was changing his party affiliation from "Democrat" to "Decline to State".

Candelaria was the first openly gay man elected to the New Mexico Legislature.

== Early life and career ==
Candelaria was born in Albuquerque, and brought up by his grandmother Elodia Gloria Candelaria. Candelaria attended St. Pius X High School, and went on to earn an A.B. from the Woodrow Wilson School of Public and International Affairs at Princeton University in 2009 after completing a 102-page long senior thesis, titled "Contemporary Venezuelan Oil Policy: An Institutional Analysis", under the supervision of Stanley Katz. At Princeton, Candelaria was a member of The Ivy Club and St. Anthony Hall.

== Career ==
Candelaria returned to Albuquerque after graduating from Princeton, working for Think New Mexico, the New Mexico Legislative Finance Committee and Ben Luján, the speaker of the New Mexico House of Representatives. In August 2011, he was appointed president and CEO of Equality New Mexico, the state's largest gay rights organization.

Candelaria is the owner and managing partner of his own law firm, Candelaria Law LLC., which opened in October 2019. Candelaria's law firm focuses in the areas of civil rights, workers compensation, criminal defense, cannabis law, and complex civil litigation. Candelaria Law LLC counts New Mexico Top Organics-Ultra Health LLC, New Mexico's largest vertically integrated cannabis company, among its clients.

=== New Mexico Senate ===
On March 5, 2012, Candelaria announced his candidacy for the New Mexico Senate, seeking the Democratic nomination in the 26th district. He was initially one of four Democrats to have filed for the seat, including incumbent Sen. Bernadette Sanchez. However, Sanchez abandoned her re-election bid on March 23, citing a desire to concentrate on her health. Three days later, Steve D. Gallegos, a former Albuquerque City Councilman and Bernalillo County Commissioner, dropped his bid for the seat and endorsed Candelaria.

The Democratic primary election held on June 5, 2012, was therefore a two-way fight between Candelaria and opponent Carlos Jose Villanueva. Candelaria took 69% of the vote, winning 1,835 votes to Villanueva's 828.

In 2017, Candelaria sponsored legislation to ban Gay conversion therapy in New Mexico. The legislation passed both the state House and Senate with substantial bi-partisan margins. The bill was ultimately signed into law by Republican Governor Susana Martinez.

Candelaria was the lead sponsor and chief legislative architect of the 2019 New Mexico Energy Transition Act. The ETA amended New Mexico's renewable energy portfolio standards to require that all investor owned utilities and rural electric collaboratives transition to one-hundred percent renewable electricity generation by 2045.

The ETA also authorized the Public Service Company of New Mexico or PNM, the state's largest investor owned utility, to issue securitized bonds to retire the utility's remaining assets in the San Juan Generating Station, a coal fire plant, and its affiliated coal mine. The law appropriates savings that result from lower interest rates on a utility's securitized bonds into three state administered funds for economic development, worker re training, and environmental remediation in communities effected by the closure of the San Juan Generating Station.

On October 24, 2020, Candelaria denounced an anti-lockdown protest held at the New Mexico Capitol Building in a television appearance. Following this, he received a number of anonymous threats via phone calls, with one including homophobic slurs and another saying that “we’re going to get you out one way or another", according to Candelaria. In response to these threats, Candelaria left his Albuquerque apartment and sought police protection.

Candelaria announced on December 6, 2021, that he was switching his party affiliation from "Democrat" to "Decline to State" following dissatisfaction with the "extreme partisanship" of the Democratic controlled redistricting process in New Mexico.

During the 2022 regular session of the New Mexico Legislature, Candelaria successfully added an amendment to a piece of omnibus criminal justice reform legislation passed that year and later signed into law by Governor Michelle Lujan Grisham which prohibits the use of the Gay Panic Defense in criminal cases in the state.

Candelaria retired from the Senate on October 19, 2022.

In his retirement letter to Maggie Toulouse Oliver, the New Mexico Secretary of State, Candelaria said that he could no longer balance the demands of his private law practice, and a desire to start a family with his husband, with volunteer service in the Senate. New Mexico is the last U.S. State with a volunteer Legislature. Members receive a per-diem for days they are in session or attending legislative interim committee meetings, but are not paid a salary or other benefits.

== Personal life ==
Candelaria is openly gay. He is the first gay man to serve in the New Mexico Legislature and only the second LGBT person, after state Senator Liz Stefanics.

Candelaria's campaign won the support of the Gay & Lesbian Victory Fund.

== See also ==
- Third-party members of state legislatures of the United States
- List of first minority male lawyers and judges in New Mexico
