= Edward Angel =

American computer scientist and educator

Edward Stanley Angel
- Born: January 6, 1944 (age 82); Brooklyn, New York, U.S.
- Education: California Institute of Technology (B.S., 1964); University of Southern California (M.S., 1966; Ph.D., 1968)
- Known for: Interactive Computer Graphics (textbook); ARTS Lab, University of New Mexico
- Awards: Senior Fulbright Lectureship (1981); ACM SIGGRAPH Distinguished Educator Award (2022); ACM SIGGRAPH Academy (2022)
- Scientific career
- Fields: Computer graphics, scientific visualization, image processing
- Workplaces: University of Southern California; University of California, Berkeley; University of Rochester; University of New Mexico
- Thesis: Dynamic Programming and Partial Differential Equations (1968)
- Doctoral advisor: Richard E. Bellman

Edward Stanley Angel (born January 6, 1944) is an American computer scientist and educator. He is professor emeritus of computer science at the University of New Mexico (UNM), where he taught from 1978 until his retirement in 2007. He is the author of the textbook Interactive Computer Graphics: A Top-Down Approach, which has gone through eight editions, and other books on OpenGL and WebGL. He was the founding director of UNM's Art, Research, Technology and Science Laboratory (ARTS Lab). In 2022 he received the ACM SIGGRAPH Distinguished Educator Award and was inducted into the ACM SIGGRAPH Academy.

== Early life and education ==
Angel was born in Brooklyn, New York. He received a B.S. in engineering from the California Institute of Technology in 1964, and an M.S. (1966) and Ph.D. (1968) in electrical engineering from the University of Southern California. His doctoral dissertation, Dynamic Programming and Partial Differential Equations, was supervised by Richard E. Bellman.

== Career ==
After his doctorate, Angel held positions at USC and the University of California, Berkeley before joining the University of Rochester in 1973, where from 1975 to 1978 he held a joint appointment in electrical engineering and in obstetrics and gynecology. He moved to the University of New Mexico in 1978, became a full professor in 1980, and chaired the Department of Computer Science from 1985 to 1988. He also directed the Arts Technology Center in UNM's College of Fine Arts (2001–2007) and held a professorship in media arts. His visiting appointments included a Senior Fulbright-Hays lectureship at the Indian Institute of Science in Bangalore (1981–1982) and a year at Imperial College London (1988–1989).

=== Research ===
Angel's early research, beginning with his doctoral work under Bellman, concerned dynamic programming and its application to partial differential equations, the subject of a 1972 monograph the two co-authored. His later work covered image processing, computer graphics and scientific visualization.

=== ARTS Lab ===
In 2003 Angel launched the ARTS Lab (Art, Research, Technology and Science Laboratory) at UNM, an interdisciplinary center drawing on New Mexico's art, technology and culture and giving equal weight to teaching, research and economic development. He was its founding director, serving as director until 2009.

=== Teaching and outreach ===
Angel is known for a top-down approach to teaching computer graphics. By 2000 his textbook had been adopted by more than 200 schools, and he has taught over 100 professional courses worldwide, including courses on OpenGL and WebGL programming at SIGGRAPH conferences between 2006 and 2021. He taught an early Coursera massive open online course in computer graphics, and contributed chapters on teaching OpenGL and WebGL to OpenGL Insights and WebGL Insights. He was involved in creating New Mexico Computer Science for All, a program that trains teachers across the state to integrate computer science into their classes. He has led or co-led National Science Foundation-funded projects on arts-based economic development and computational thinking in New Mexico schools. He has also served on several boards related to film, media, computing education and startups in New Mexico and South Carolina.

== Awards and honors ==
- Senior Fulbright Lectureship (1981)
- First UNM Presidential Teaching Fellow (1993)
- Prize for Inter-American Informatics, Institute for Advanced Studies of the Organization of American States (2006)
- Exemplary Service Award, UNM School of Engineering Alumni Leadership Board (2019)
- ACM SIGGRAPH Distinguished Educator Award (2022)
- ACM SIGGRAPH Academy (2022)

== Selected books ==
- Angel, Edward; Bellman, Richard (1972). Dynamic Programming and Partial Differential Equations. Mathematics in Science and Engineering. Vol. 88. New York: Academic Press. ISBN 0-12-057950-2.
- Computer Graphics: A Comprehensive Introduction. Integrated Computer Systems Publishing, 1983.
- Computer Graphics. Addison-Wesley, 1990.
- OpenGL: A Primer. Addison-Wesley, 2001; 3rd ed. 2008.
- Interactive Computer Graphics: A Top-Down Approach. Addison-Wesley, 1st ed. 1997. The 7th (2015) and 8th (2020) editions use WebGL; the 8th is co-authored with Dave Shreiner.
- Angel, Edward; Shreiner, Dave (2020). Interactive Computer Graphics: A Top-Down Approach with WebGL (8th ed.). Pearson. ISBN 978-0-13-521716-0.

== Personal life ==
Angel lives in Santa Fe, New Mexico, with his wife, Rose Mary Molnar.
