= Rebecca W. Keller =

American author and scientist

Rebecca W. Keller 'is an American author and scientist. She incorporated Gravitas Publications Inc in 2003 to develop and publish core sciences curriculum under the Real Science-4-Kids imprint. She has authored and published Real Science-4-Kids student texts, teacher manuals, and student laboratory workbooks in chemistry, biology and physics to serve kindergarten through ninth grade, available through mainstream and home school book distributors.

== Education ==
1985 BS Chemistry, New Mexico Institute of Mining and Technology, Socorro, NM
1992 PhD Biophysical Chemistry, University of New Mexico, Albuquerque, NM
1994–1998 Post-Doc Molecular Biology, University of New Mexico, Albuquerque, NM
1998–1999 Post-Doc Molecular Biology, University of California Berkeley, Berkeley CA

== Career ==
A former research assistant professor at the University of New Mexico in Albuquerque, Dr. Rebecca W. Keller worked in the molecular biology field. Her background in biophysics, molecular biology and neuroscience led her to prepare labs and curriculum for her children and neighbors. As a homeschool mom, she developed Real Science-4-Kids to be a comprehensive science curriculum that taught solid science concepts in a manner understandable for youngsters.

In 2001, she began to develop a formalized training program to equip non-science teachers (usually other moms) to feel comfortable with the material. Today Real Science-4-Kids is being taught by homeschoolers in 50 states as well as Australia, New Zealand, Canada, Europe, India, Japan and Korea. Keller's team continues to develop and test new products. The Real Science-4-Kids curriculum line has now grown to service private and public school systems as well as the homeschool community.

Gravitas textbooks are used as homeschool texts in all 50 states and in six foreign countries, winning a 2020 Readers award from Practical Homeschooling magazine in the category of science-middle school. Gravitas also received the 2019 Best Homeschool and Curriculum Resources Award from How to Homeschool. They are also a Well-Trained Mind Top Recommendation recipient.

Dr. Keller's scientific and educational philosophy can be summarized in her own words as follows: "If we can teach kids how to think critically and evaluate data and viewpoints and philosophies from all directions, they can learn how to tell the difference between a valid and scientifically sound argument and an invalid and scientifically flawed argument. I will always be an advocate of opposing viewpoints: opposing data, opposing perspectives, opposing philosophies, etc. Not because I think all viewpoints are true or valid, but because without the exercise of evaluating all viewpoints, we don’t understand why something is true or false. For science specifically, if we can help kids learn how to evaluate data then we don’t have to censor or worry about what information or false information crosses their path."

=== Related work and service ===
- Columbia, South Carolina January 23, 2006

Was invited by Senator Mike Fair to testify before the Education Oversight Committee in favor of language to allow students to “critically evaluate” all scientific data.

- Santa Fe, New Mexico August 29, 2003

Member of the Framework Committee and Writing Team for revision of the 2003 New Mexico Science Standards. Presented before Education Department in favor of the revised New Mexico State Science Standards.

- Socorro, New Mexico 1995–2001

Judge and Chairman, Junior Microbiology Division, New Mexico State Science Fair

== Publications ==
=== Books–textbooks written ===
1. Real Science-4-Kids, Kogs-4-Kids, Chemistry Level I Connects to The Arts, Gravitas Publications, Inc. 2008. ISBN 978-0-9799459-5-3
2. Real Science-4-Kids, Kogs-4-Kids, Chemistry Level I Connects to Language, Gravitas Publications, Inc. 2008. ISBN 978-0-9799459-1-5
3. Real Science-4-Kids, Kogs-4-Kids, Chemistry Level I Connects to Technology, Gravitas Publications, Inc. 2008. ISBN 978-0-9799459-8-4
4. Real Science-4-Kids, Kogs-4-Kids, Chemistry Level I Connects to History, Gravitas Publications, Inc. 2008. ISBN 978-0-9799459-6-0
5. Real Science-4-Kids, Kogs-4-Kids, Chemistry Level I Connects to Philosophy, Gravitas Publications, Inc. 2008. ISBN 978-0-9799459-7-7
6. Real Science-4-Kids, Kogs-4-Kids, Chemistry Level I Connects to Critical Thinking, Gravitas Publications, Inc. 2008. ISBN 978-0-9799459-3-9
7. Real Science-4-Kids Biology Pre-Level I, Gravitas Publications, Inc. 2008. ISBN 978-0-9799459-0-8
8. Real Science-4-Kids Biology Pre-Level I Laboratory Workbook, Gravitas Publications, Inc. 2008. ISBN 978-0-9799459-1-5
9. Real Science-4-Kids Biology Pre- Level I Teacher's Manual, Gravitas Publications, Inc. 2008. ISBN 978-0-9799459-2-2
10. Real Science-4-Kids Biology Level I, Gravitas Publications, Inc. 2007. ISBN 978-0-9749149-2-3
11. Real Science-4-Kids Biology Level I Laboratory Workbook, Gravitas Publications, Inc. 2007.ISBN 9780974914930
12. Real Science-4-Kids Biology Level I Teacher's Manual, Gravitas Publications, Inc. 2007. ISBN 978-0-9749149-9-2
13. Real Science-4-Kids Physics Level I, Gravitas Publications, Inc. 2007. ISBN 978-0-9749149-4-7
14. Real Science-4-Kids Physics Level I Laboratory Workbook, Gravitas Publications, Inc. 2007. ISBN 978-0-9749149-5-4
15. Real Science-4-Kids Physics Level I Teacher's Manual, Gravitas Publications, Inc. 2007. ISBN 978-0-9749149-7-8
16. Real Science-4-Kids Chemistry Pre-Level I, Gravitas Publications, Inc. 2007. ISBN 978-0-9765097-0-7
17. Real Science-4-Kids Chemistry Pre-Level I Laboratory Workbook, Gravitas Publications, Inc. 2007. ISBN 978-0-9765097-1-4
18. Real Science-4-Kids Chemistry Pre- Level I Teacher's Manual, Gravitas Publications, Inc. 2007. ISBN 978-0-9765097-2-1
19. Real Science-4-Kids Chemistry Level I, Gravitas Publications, Inc. 2006. ISBN 978-0-9749149-0-9
20. Real Science-4-Kids Chemistry Level I Laboratory Workbook, Gravitas Publications, Inc. 2006. ISBN 978-0-9749149-1-6
21. Real Science-4-Kids Chemistry Level I Teacher's Manual, Gravitas Publications, Inc. 2006. ISBN 978-0-9749149-8-5
22. Real Science-4-Kids Level I Combined Teacher's Manual, Gravitas Publications, Inc. 2006. ISBN 978-0-9749149-6-1
1. Real Science-4-Kids Focus On Elementary Astronomy, Gravitas Publications, Inc. 2019. ISBN 978-1-941181-63-8
2. Real Science-4-Kids Focus On Elementary Astronomy, Laboratory Workbook, Gravitas Publications, Inc. 2019. ISBN 978-1-941181-31-7
3. Real Science-4-Kids Focus On Elementary Astronomy, Teacher's Manual, Gravitas Publications, Inc. 2019. ISBN 978-1-941181-32-4
4. Real Science-4-Kids Focus On Middle School Astronomy, Gravitas Publications, Inc. 2019. ISBN 978-1-941181-68-3
5. Real Science-4-Kids Focus On Middle School Astronomy, Laboratory Workbook, Gravitas Publications, Inc. 2019.ISBN 978-1-941181-46-1
6. Real Science-4-Kids Focus On Middle School Astronomy, Teacher's Manual, Gravitas Publications, Inc. 2019. ISBN 978-1-941181-47-8
7. Real Science-4-Kids Focus On Elementary Biology, Gravitas Publications, Inc. 2019. ISBN 978-1-941181-64-5
8. Real Science-4-Kids Focus On Elementary Biology, Laboratory Workbook, Gravitas Publications, Inc. 2019. ISBN 978-1-941181-34-8
9. Real Science-4-Kids Focus On Elementary Biology, Teacher's Manual, Gravitas Publications, Inc. 2019. ISBN 978-1-941181-35-5
10. Real Science-4-Kids Focus On Middle School Biology, Gravitas Publications, Inc. 2019. ISBN 978-1-941181-69-0
11. Real Science-4-Kids Focus On Middle School Biology, Laboratory Workbook, Gravitas Publications, Inc. 2019.ISBN 978-1-941181-49-2
12. Real Science-4-Kids Focus On Middle School Biology, Teacher's Manual, Gravitas Publications, Inc. 2019. ISBN 978-1-941181-50-8
13. Real Science-4-Kids Focus On Elementary Geology, Gravitas Publications, Inc. 2019. ISBN 978-1-941181-66-9
14. Real Science-4-Kids Focus On Elementary Geology, Laboratory Workbook, Gravitas Publications, Inc. 2019. ISBN 978-1-941181-40-9
15. Real Science-4-Kids Focus On Elementary Geology, Teacher's Manual, Gravitas Publications, Inc. 2019. ISBN 978-1-941181-41-6
16. Real Science-4-Kids Focus On Middle School Geology, Gravitas Publications, Inc. 2019. ISBN 978-1-941181-71-3
17. Real Science-4-Kids Focus On Middle School Geology, Laboratory Workbook, Gravitas Publications, Inc. 2019.ISBN 978-1-941181-55-3
18. Real Science-4-Kids Focus On Middle School Geology, Teacher's Manual, Gravitas Publications, Inc. 2019. ISBN 978-1-941181-56-0
19. Real Science-4-Kids Focus On Elementary Physics, Gravitas Publications, Inc. 2019. ISBN 978-1-941181-67-6
20. Real Science-4-Kids Focus On Elementary Physics, Laboratory Workbook, Gravitas Publications, Inc. 2019. ISBN 978-1-941181-43-0
21. Real Science-4-Kids Focus On Elementary Physics, Teacher's Manual, Gravitas Publications, Inc. 2019. ISBN 978-1-941181-44-7
22. Real Science-4-Kids Focus On Middle School Physics, Gravitas Publications, Inc. 2019. ISBN 978-1-941181-72-0
23. Real Science-4-Kids Focus On Middle School Physics, Laboratory Workbook, Gravitas Publications, Inc. 2019. ISBN 978-1-941181-73-7
24. Real Science-4-Kids Focus On Middle School Physics, Teacher's Manual, Gravitas Publications, Inc. 2019. ISBN 978-1-941181-74-4
25. Real Science-4-Kids Focus On Elementary Chemistry, Gravitas Publications, Inc. 2019. ISBN 978-1-941181-65-2
26. Real Science-4-Kids Focus On Elementary Chemistry, Laboratory Workbook, Gravitas Publications, Inc. 2019. ISBN 978-1-941181-37-9
27. Real Science-4-Kids Focus On Elementary Chemistry, Teacher's Manual, Gravitas Publications, Inc. 2019. ISBN 978-1-941181-38-6
28. Real Science-4-Kids Focus On Middle School Chemistry, Gravitas Publications, Inc. 2019. ISBN 978-1-941181-65-2
29. Real Science-4-Kids Focus On Middle School Chemistry, Laboratory Workbook, Gravitas Publications, Inc. 2019. ISBN 978-1-941181-37-9
30. Real Science-4-Kids Focus On Middle School Chemistry, Teacher's Manual, Gravitas Publications, Inc. 2019. ISBN 978-1-941181-38-6
1. Real Science-4-Kids Exploring the Building Blocks of Science, Book K Activity Book, Gravitas Publications, Inc. ISBN 978-1-941181-25-6
2. Real Science-4-Kids Exploring the Building Blocks of Science, Book 1 Textbook, Gravitas Publications, Inc. ISBN 978-1-936114-30-6
3. Real Science-4-Kids Exploring the Building Blocks of Science, Book 1 Lab Notebook, Gravitas Publications, Inc. ISBN 978-1-936114-31-3
4. Real Science-4-Kids Exploring the Building Blocks of Science, Book 1 Teacher Manual, Gravitas Publications, Inc. ISBN 978-1-936114-32-0
5. Real Science-4-Kids Exploring the Building Blocks of Science, Book 2 Textbook, Gravitas Publications, Inc. ISBN 978-1-936114-34-4
6. Real Science-4-Kids Exploring the Building Blocks of Science, Book 2 Lab Notebook, Gravitas Publications, Inc. ISBN 978-1-936114-35-1
7. Real Science-4-Kids Exploring the Building Blocks of Science, Book 2 Teacher Manual, Gravitas Publications, Inc. ISBN 978-1-936114-36-8
8. Real Science-4-Kids Exploring the Building Blocks of Science, Book 3 Textbook, Gravitas Publications, Inc. ISBN 978-1-941181-01-0
9. Real Science-4-Kids Exploring the Building Blocks of Science, Book 3 Lab Notebook, Gravitas Publications, Inc. ISBN 978-1-941181-02-7
10. Real Science-4-Kids Exploring the Building Blocks of Science, Book 3 Teacher Manual, Gravitas Publications, Inc. ISBN 978-1-941181-03-4
11. Real Science-4-Kids Exploring the Building Blocks of Science, Book 4 Textbook, Gravitas Publications, Inc. ISBN 978-1-941181-05-8
12. Real Science-4-Kids Exploring the Building Blocks of Science, Book 4 Lab Notebook, Gravitas Publications, Inc. ISBN 978-1-941181-06-5
13. Real Science-4-Kids Exploring the Building Blocks of Science, Book 4 Teacher Manual, Gravitas Publications, Inc. ISBN 978-1-941181-07-2
14. Real Science-4-Kids Exploring the Building Blocks of Science, Book 5 Textbook, Gravitas Publications, Inc. ISBN 978-1-941181-09-6
15. Real Science-4-Kids Exploring the Building Blocks of Science, Book 5 Lab Notebook, Gravitas Publications, Inc. ISBN 978-1-941181-10-2
16. Real Science-4-Kids Exploring the Building Blocks of Science, Book 5 Teacher Manual, Gravitas Publications, Inc. ISBN 978-1-941181-11-9
17. Real Science-4-Kids Exploring the Building Blocks of Science, Book 6 Textbook, Gravitas Publications, Inc. ISBN 978-1-941181-13-3
18. Real Science-4-Kids Exploring the Building Blocks of Science, Book 6 Lab Notebook, Gravitas Publications, Inc. ISBN 978-1-941181-14-0
19. Real Science-4-Kids Exploring the Building Blocks of Science, Book 6 Teacher Manual, Gravitas Publications, Inc. ISBN 978-1-941181-15-7
20. Real Science-4-Kids Exploring the Building Blocks of Science, Book 7 Textbook, Gravitas Publications, Inc. ISBN 978-1-941181-17-1
21. Real Science-4-Kids Exploring the Building Blocks of Science, Book 7 Lab Notebook, Gravitas Publications, Inc. ISBN 978-1-941181-18-8
22. Real Science-4-Kids Exploring the Building Blocks of Science, Book 7 Teacher Manual, Gravitas Publications, Inc. ISBN 978-1-941181-19-5

=== Articles–scientific journals ===
- Bustamante, Carlos; Vesenka, James; Tang, Chun Lin; Rees, William; Guthold, Martin; Keller, Rebecca (1992-01-14). "Circular DNA molecules imaged in air by scanning force microscopy". Biochemistry. 31 (1). American Chemical Society (ACS): 22–26. doi:10.1021/bi00116a005. ISSN 0006-2960. PMID 1310032.
- Keller, D.; Bustamante, C.; Keller, R. W. (1989-07-01). "Imaging of single uncoated DNA molecules by scanning tunneling microscopy". Proceedings of the National Academy of Sciences. 86 (14): 5356–5360. Bibcode:1989PNAS...86.5356K. doi:10.1073/pnas.86.14.5356. ISSN 0027-8424. PMC 297621. PMID 2748591.
- Keller, Rebecca W.; Dunlap, David D.; Bustamante, Carlos; Keller, David J.; Garcia, Ricardo G.; et al. (1990). "Scanning tunneling microscopy images of metal-coated bacteriophages and uncoated, double-stranded DNA". Journal of Vacuum Science & Technology A: Vacuum, Surfaces, and Films. 8 (1). American Vacuum Society: 706–712. Bibcode:1990JVSTA...8..706K. doi:10.1116/1.576988. ISSN 0734-2101.
- Keller, Rebecca W.; Bear, D.; Bustamante, C. (1991). "A method for imaging E. coli. RNA polymerase holoenzyme with the scanning tunneling microscope in an aqueous environment". Journal of Vacuum Science & Technology B: Microelectronics and Nanometer Structures. 9 (2). American Vacuum Society: 1291–1299. Bibcode:1991JVSTB...9.1291K. doi:10.1116/1.585224. ISSN 0734-211X.
- Keller, Rebecca W.; Keller, David J.; Bear, David; Vasenka, Jamie; Bustamante, Carlos (1992). "Electrodeposition procedure of E. coli RNA polymerase onto gold and deposition of E. coli RNA polymerase onto mica for observation with scanning force microscopy". Ultramicroscopy. 42–44. Elsevier BV: 1173–1180. doi:10.1016/0304-3991(92)90420-o. ISSN 0304-3991. PMID 1413255.
- Keller, Rebecca W.; Kühn, Uwe; Aragón, Mateo; Bornikova, Larissa; Wahle, Elmar; Bear, David G. (2000). "The nuclear poly(A) binding protein, PABP2, forms an oligomeric particle covering the length of the poly(A) tail". Journal of Molecular Biology. 297 (3). Elsevier BV: 569–583. doi:10.1006/jmbi.2000.3572. ISSN 0022-2836. PMID 10731412.
- Postow, Lisa; Ullsperger, Chris; Keller, Rebecca W.; Bustamante, Carlos; Vologodskii, Alexander V.; Cozzarelli, Nicholas R. (2000-10-30). "Positive Torsional Strain Causes the Formation of a Four-way Junction at Replication Forks". Journal of Biological Chemistry. 276 (4). American Society for Biochemistry & Molecular Biology (ASBMB): 2790–2796. doi:10.1074/jbc.m006736200. ISSN 0021-9258. PMID 11056156.
- Rees, W.; Keller, R.; Vesenka, J.; Yang, G; Bustamante, C (1993-06-11). "Evidence of DNA bending in transcription complexes imaged by scanning force microscopy". Science. 260 (5114). American Association for the Advancement of Science (AAAS): 1646–1649. Bibcode:1993Sci...260.1646R. doi:10.1126/science.8503010. ISSN 0036-8075. PMID 8503010.
