= Lisa Curtis =

American politician

Lisa K. Curtis

Member of the New Mexico Senate from the 21st district
- In office 2012 – January 2013
- Preceded by: Kent Cravens
- Succeeded by: Mark Moores

Personal details
- Party: Democratic
- Children: 4
- Education: University of New Mexico (BA, JD)

Lisa K. Curtis is an American politician and attorney who served as a member of the New Mexico Senate from 2012 to 2013. Curtis was appointed to the Senate after the resignation of Kent Cravens. She was defeated in her bid for a full term by Mark Moores and left office in January 2013.

== Education ==
Curtis earned a Bachelor of Arts degree from the University of New Mexico and a Juris Doctor from the University of New Mexico School of Law.

== Career ==
Since graduating from law school in 1993, Curtis has worked as a malpractice attorney in Albuquerque, New Mexico. She is a managing partner of Curtis and Co. In 2012, Curtis was appointed to the New Mexico Senate by then-Governor Susana Martinez after the resignation of Kent Cravens. In November 2013, Curtis was defeated for election to a full term by Republican nominee Mark Moores.

== Personal life ==
Curtis and her husband, Bob, have four children.
