= Larry Torres =

American foreign languages educator

- Born: 1954; Arroyo Seco, New Mexico, USA
- Occupation: Associate professor

Larry Torres is an American writer and educator who was an associate professor of foreign languages at the University of New Mexico in Taos, New Mexico. He has taught Russian, French, Spanish, English, bilingual education and ancient languages. In 2003, he was the head of the university's Fine Arts and Culture Department. He is also a founding member of the Governor's School for International Studies in Tennessee.

Torres is the author of Six Nuevomexicano Folk Dramas for Advent Season and has contributed to a number of other works. He is regularly recognized for his expertise in the culture and folklore of northern New Mexico.

In May 2019, Torres announced his retirement from teaching.

== Early life ==
Larry Torres is the second of eight children born to parents who, themselves, never completed high school.

== Awards and recognitions ==
Torres has received a number of awards for his work in the field of education. He was a recipient of the Walt Disney Corporation's Outstanding National Foreign Language Teacher of the Year Award in 1992. In 1993, he received the National Educator Award. He was also a recipient of the Golden Apple Award for which he received a scholarship and sabbatical to continue his research.

Torres has been named Outstanding New Mexican of the Year twice. Torres was given the Camino Real Award as one of 15 Outstanding New Mexicans for 1996.

In 1998, his radio talk show Cafecito y Cultura won first place for best public service from the Associated Press and in 1999 his radio show Paso a Paso won a first place for best documentary on the airwaves, also by the Associated Press of New Mexico.

In 2003, Torres received a grant through the United States Department of Agriculture (USDA) to work with New Mexico State University in the development of material for the teaching of first generation Hispanic students at the university level. Its focus is on cultural sensitivity training and enhancement.

== Public appearances ==
In 2005, he appeared on the television show Good Morning America and in 2008 on NBC's The Today Show to discuss the Taos Hum. He has also appeared on The Tonight Show with Jay Leno and the national radio show America Tonight.

== Works ==
=== Books ===
- Núñez, Guillermina; Torres, Larry (1992). Yo seigo de Taosi: ensayos culturales Nuevo Mexicanos (in Spanish). El Crepúsculo, Inc. ISBN 978-0963291400.
- Torres, Larry (1999). Six Nuevomexicano Folk Dramas for the Advent Season. University of New Mexico Press. ISBN 978-0-8263-1963-0.
- Torres, Larry (2010). Cruising the Camino Real. El Hermitano Press. ISBN 978-0984282609.
- Torres, Larry (2010). In the Footsteps of the Hermit. El Hermitano Press. ISBN 978-0984282616.
- Torres, Larry (2021). The Children of the Blue Nun. Outskirts Press. ISBN 978-1977239990.
- Torres, Larry (n.d.). Habla Usted Spanglish. IAJ Press. ISBN 978-0983495055.

=== Podcasts ===
- Torres, Larry (2012). In the Footsteps of the Hermit (multiple podcasts). Cultural Perspectives. New Mexico State University, Media Productions.

=== Articles ===
- "Habla Usted Spamglish?" weekly column in The Taos News.
- "Growing up Spanglish" weekly column in The Santa Fe New Mexican.
- Four entries in the Hispanic American Religious Culture.
- Multiple entries in the Sacred Places of Taos.
