= Cliff Pirtle =

American politician

Member of the New Mexico Senate from the 32nd district
- In office January 1, 2013 – December 31, 2024
- Preceded by: Timothy Jennings
- Succeeded by: Candy Ezzell

Personal details
- Born: 1985 or 1986 (age 40–41)
- Party: Republican
- Website: cliffpirtle.com

Cliff R. Pirtle (born 1985/1986) is an American politician who served as a Republican member of the New Mexico Senate, representing district 32 from January 1, 2013 to December 31, 2024.

== Controversy ==
On March 12, 2023, Santa Fe, NM, police officers were dispatched to home that Cliff R. Pirtle rented in Santa Fe during the 2023 legislative session. Officers responded to a domestic dispute between Cliff and his wife Aysia Pirtle. The disturbance between them began when Ms. Pirtle caught her husband in bed with a New Mexico Senate employee.

== Education and career ==
Pirtle graduated from Roswell High School.

In December 2020, in the aftermath of the 2020 presidential election, Pirtle supported an audit of the election. Pirtle claimed it was unclear whether Biden won the presidency.

== Elections ==
- 2012: To challenge District 32 incumbent Democratic Senator Timothy Jennings, Pirtle ran in the June 5, 2012 Republican Primary, winning by 9 votes with 1,018 votes (50.2%) and won the November 6, 2012 General election with 5,930 votes (52.3%) against Senator Jennings, who had served in the seat since 1979.
- 2024: Pirtle chose not to seek re-election. Candy Ezzell succeeded him as the district 32 senator.
