= Mark Moores =

American politician (born 1970)

Member of the New Mexico Senate from the 21st district
- In office January 1, 2013 – December 31, 2024
- Preceded by: Lisa Curtis
- Succeeded by: Nicole Tobiassen

Personal details
- Born: Mark David Moores; April 28, 1970 (age 56) Bethesda, Maryland, U.S.
- Party: Republican
- Spouse: Lisa Moores
- Children: 4
- Education: University of New Mexico (BA, MBA)

Mark David Moores (born April 28, 1970) is an American businessman and politician who served as a member of the New Mexico Senate for the 21st district from 2013 to 2024. He was the Republican nominee for the 2021 New Mexico's 1st congressional district special election, which he lost to Democrat Melanie Stansbury.

== Early life and education ==
Moores was born and raised in the suburbs of Washington, D.C. His mother, who is of Hispano descent, is originally from Española, New Mexico and Moores spent summers and holidays in northern New Mexico. After graduating from Walt Whitman High School, Moores moved to New Mexico to attend the University of New Mexico, where he was awarded a scholarship to play football for the Lobos. He earned a Bachelor of Arts degree in political science and later an MBA from the Anderson School of Management.

== Career ==
=== Early career ===
Moores was the chief of staff for Lieutenant Governor Walter Dwight Bradley and a field representative for Congressman Steven Schiff. From 2006 to 2017, Moores was the executive director of the New Mexico Dental Association, where he was responsible for managing free dental clinics across New Mexico.

=== New Mexico Senate ===
In 2012, Moores ran in the three-way Republican primary for the 21st district of the New Mexico Senate, winning with 2,020 votes (50%). He won the November 6, 2012 general election with 14,067 votes (56.6%) against incumbent Democratic senator Lisa Curtis, who had been appointed to fill the vacancy when Kent Cravens resigned. In 2016, Moores defeated Democratic nominee Gregory B. Frazier with 15,164 votes (56.09%).

=== 2021 congressional election ===
In March 2021, Moores announced his candidacy for the 2021 New Mexico's 1st congressional district special election. He earned the Republican party's nomination at the committee selection on March 27, 2021. He faced State Representative Melanie Stansbury and former Public Lands Commissioner Aubrey Dunn Jr. in the June 1 election.

Moores lost to Stansbury in the special election.

== Personal life ==
Moores and his wife, Lisa Moores, have four children and three grandchildren.
