= Ted Barela =

American politician

Member of the New Mexico Senate from the 39th district
- In office April 3, 2015 – January 2017
- Preceded by: Phil Griego
- Succeeded by: Liz Stefanics

Mayor of Estancia, New Mexico
- In office 2008–2013

Personal details
- Born: Estancia, New Mexico
- Party: Republican
- Spouse: Janice
- Children: 3

Ted Barela is an American Republican politician formerly serving in the New Mexico Senate. He was appointed by Governor Susana Martinez in 2015 to replace Phil Griego, who resigned. Barela previously served as mayor of Estancia, New Mexico, from 2008 until 2013.

== Personal life ==
Barela and his wife, Janice, have three children: Jonathan, Alyssa, and Sharalynn; and six grandchildren: Quintin, Abigail, JC, Hattie, Gracelynn and Zander.
