= Liz Stefanics =

American politician

Member of the New Mexico Senate from the 39th district
- Incumbent
- Assumed office January 2017
- Preceded by: Ted Barela
- In office January 1993 – December 1996
- Succeeded by: Phil Griego

Member of the Santa Fe County Commission from the 5th district
- In office January 1, 2009 – January 2017
- Preceded by: Jack Sullivan

Personal details
- Born: November 9, 1950 (age 75) Dayton, Ohio
- Party: Democratic
- Domestic partner: Linda Siegle

Elizabeth T. Stefanics (born November 9, 1950) is an American politician from New Mexico, currently serving in the New Mexico Senate and previously on the Santa Fe County Commission. She was the first openly LGBT member of the New Mexico legislature, serving a single four-year term that began in January 1993. Stefanics is a progressive senator.

== Early life and career ==
Stefanics was born and raised in Dayton, Ohio but moved to New Mexico to teach at the University of New Mexico in 1982. The daughter of an airplane mechanic and a secretary, she earned three college degrees. She graduated with a bachelor's degree from Eastern Kentucky University, before doing a masters in resource management at the University of Wisconsin and earning a doctorate in administration and law from the University of Minnesota. In addition, she has done post-doctoral work at the University of New Mexico in public administration and health care. She spent more than ten years as the executive director of Open Hands, a charity serving the elderly, disabled and poor, before it shutdown from a lack of funds and substantial debt. Before that, she was executive director of New Mexico AIDS Services.

== Professional career ==
=== State Senate ===
In 1992, Stefanics ran for the New Mexico Senate in the 39th district, a mostly rural district covering parts of six counties in northern New Mexico. She won the seat and took office in January 1993. During her four years in the senate, she co-chaired the Health and Human Services Interim Committee.

In her race for re-election in 1996, she faced a primary challenge from Phil Griego, a former member of Santa Fe City Council. She lost the primary election by a margin of 54 votes and Griego went on to win the seat.

In 1998, she ran for a seat on the newly created Public Regulation Commission from the 3rd district. In the primary election held on June 2, 1998, she faced fellow Democrat Jerome Block. The race was extremely close and Stefanics originally appeared to have won but final results, which included a number of originally uncounted ballots from Rio Arriba County, showed Block winning by approximately 0.2%. He went on to win the general election handily.

In 2000, she mounted a rematch against Griego, aiming to win back the seat she'd previously held in the state senate. She lost the primary by 53% to 47%.

Nearly 15 years after losing to Greigo, Stefanics announced in September 2015 that she would run again for the state senate in the 39th district.

During the 2025 legislative session, Stefanics served as the chair of the Senate Conservation committee.

=== Executive appointments ===
Stefanics spent several years as the director of the New Mexico Health Policy Commission, a post to which she was appointed by Governor Bill Richardson. She had previously spent three years as deputy secretary of the state Human Services Department.

=== County Commission ===
In 2008, Stefanics mounted a bid for the Santa Fe County Commission from the 5th district, which covers Eldorado and the Community College District south of the city. She won the Democratic primary election convincingly, garnering 52% of the vote in a five-way race. She was unopposed in the general election and took office on January 1, 2009. Stefanics was up for re-election in 2012 but drew no opponents in either the primary or general elections. She can not run again due to term limits.

== Personal life ==
Stefanics is a lesbian and was the first openly gay person to serve in the New Mexico Legislature. She has spent almost two decades with her partner, Linda Siegle, a former chairman of the Santa Fe Community College Board of Trustees. Her campaigns have often won the support of the Gay & Lesbian Victory Fund.

On August 23, 2013, Stefanics and Siegle became the first same-sex couple in Santa Fe County to receive a marriage license as issued by the county clerk.
