= John Sapien =

American politician

Member of the New Mexico Senate from the 9th district
- In office 2009 – January 19, 2021
- Preceded by: Steven A. Komadina
- Succeeded by: Brenda McKenna

Personal details
- Born: June 4, 1970 (age 56) Albuquerque, New Mexico, U.S.
- Party: Democratic
- Children: 3
- Education: University of New Mexico (BBA)

John M. Sapien (born June 4, 1970) is an American politician who served as a member of the New Mexico Senate from 2009 to 2021.

== Early life and education ==
Born in Albuquerque, New Mexico, Sapien graduated Bernalillo High School in 1988. He earned a Bachelor of Business Administration from the University of New Mexico in 1992.

== Career ==
Sapien has been the chairman of the Senate Education Committee since 2013 and is chairman of the Legislative Education Study Committee. Sapien interned for Senator Jeff Bingaman. Sapien's father, Bill, served as a Sandoval County commissioner.
