= Sander Rue =

American politician

Member of the New Mexico Senate from the 23rd district
- In office January 2009 – January 19, 2021
- Preceded by: Joseph Carraro
- Succeeded by: Harold Pope Jr.

Personal details
- Born: February 6, 1954 (age 72) Missoula, Montana, U.S.
- Party: Republican
- Education: University of New Mexico (BBA)

Sander Rue (born February 6, 1954) is an American politician who served as a member of the New Mexico Senate from January 2009 to January 2021.

== Education ==
Rue earned a Bachelor of Business Administration from the University of New Mexico.

== Elections ==
- In 2020, Rue was defeated by Democratic nominee Harold Pope Jr.
- 2012: Rue was unopposed for both the June 5, 2012 Republican Primary, winning with 1,894 votes and the November 6, 2012 General election with 14,327 votes.
- 2002: When House District 23 incumbent Republican Representative Robert Burpo ran for Governor of New Mexico, Rue ran in the three-way 2002 Republican Primary but lost to Eric Youngbird (their totals are reversed), who went on to win the November 5, 2002 General election against Democratic nominee Jim Southard.
- 2008: When Senate District 23 Independent Senator Joseph Carraro retired and left the seat open, Rue ran in the June 8, 2008 Republican Primary, winning with 2,218 votes (53.7%) and was unopposed for the November 4, 2008 General election, winning with 22,238 votes.
