= Eric Griego =

American politician (born 1966)

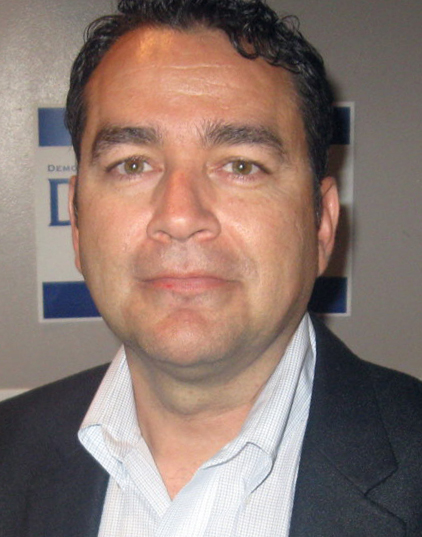

Member of the New Mexico Senate from the 14th district
- In office 2009–2013
- Preceded by: James G. Taylor
- Succeeded by: Michael Padilla

Member of the Albuquerque City Council from the 3rd district
- In office January 1, 1999 – December 31, 2004
- Preceded by: Adell Baca-Hundley
- Succeeded by: Isaac Benton

Personal details
- Born: January 22, 1966 (age 60) Albuquerque, New Mexico, U.S.
- Party: Democratic
- Education: New Mexico State University (BA); University of Maryland (MPA)

Eric G. Griego (born January 22, 1966) is an American politician from the state of New Mexico. A member of the Democratic Party, he served in the New Mexico Senate, representing the 14th district, from 2009 to 2013. He began his political career elected as a councilman to the Albuquerque City Council, serving 1999 to 2004.

Griego sought the Democratic nomination in the 2012 Congressional election, losing to future Governor Michelle Lujan Grisham in the three-candidate primary.

== Early life and education ==
Griego was born in 1966 and raised in a Catholic family in Albuquerque, New Mexico. After attending local schools, Griego completed a Bachelor of Arts degree in Journalism and Government at New Mexico State University in 1989 and a Master of Public Administration in Public Management at the University of Maryland in 1991.

== Career ==
Griego worked as an international economist for the Department of Labor, and as a specialist in Latin American labor issues. He also served as Assistant Cabinet Secretary, New Mexico Economic Development Department, 2005–2007. He has served as executive director, New Mexico Voices for Children, 2009–2012.

He became more active in politics, and in 1999 he was elected as a Democrat to the Albuquerque City Council, serving until 2004. In 2008 he was elected to the New Mexico State Senate, serving until early 2013.

In 2012 Griego ran in the Democratic primary for the nomination to the US House of Representatives seat from New Mexico's 1st congressional district. It was a three-way race, won by Michelle Lujan Grisham. She also won the general election. She has since been elected as governor of the state. In 2016, Griego became the New Mexico director of the Working Families Party.

In 2023, Griego obtained a fellowship with the Fulbright Program.

== Personal life ==
Griego and his x-wife, Kim, have 2 children.

On January 20, 2013, his brother Greg, sister-in-law Sarah, and three of their ten children were found shot to death in their home in the south valley of Albuquerque, New Mexico. Greg and Sarah's son Nehemiah, 15 years old at the time, was convicted of the murders.
