= Lisa Torraco =

American politician

Member of the New Mexico Senate from the 18th district
- In office January 15, 2013 – January 15, 2017
- Preceded by: Mark Boitano
- Succeeded by: Bill Tallman

Personal details
- Born: April 30, 1962 (age 64)
- Party: Republican
- Education: University of New Mexico (BA, JD)
- Website: lisatorraco.com

Lisa A. Torraco (born April 30, 1962) is an American attorney and politician who served as a Republican member of the New Mexico Senate from January 15, 2013 to January 15, 2017.

== Education ==
Lisa Torraco earned a Bachelor of Arts degree in economics from the University of New Mexico in 1988 and a Juris Doctor from the University of New Mexico School of Law in 1991.

== Career ==
She began her legal career as a prosecutor at the Second Judicial District Attorney's office and gained respect as a young prosecutor, and was awarded New Prosecutor of the Year in 1993.

Torraco founded Torraco law in 2006 after finishing ten years teaching at the University of New Mexico School of Law in the District Attorney Clinical law program. Torraco practices law throughout the state of New Mexico in both state and federal court.

=== Elections ===
- 2012 When District 18 Republican Senator Mark Boitano retired and left the seat open, Torraco ran in the June 5, 2012 Republican Primary, winning with 2,045 votes (61%) and won the November 6, 2012 General election with 12,092 votes (51.8%) against Democratic nominee Bill Tallman.
- A leader in Criminal Justice, Torraco quickly rose to leadership position, being the only conservative Republican to hold a committee chair position on the Criminal Justice Reform Subcommittee.
- Torraco's work in voter reforms earned her accolades from both sides of the aisle, streamlining voter registration and voter access for military and overseas voters.
- Torraco was defeated in the 2016 election by the Democratic nominee Bill Tallman.
