= Lee Cotter =

American politician

Member of the New Mexico Senate from the 36th district
- In office January 15, 2013 – January 2017
- Preceded by: Mary Jane Garcia
- Succeeded by: Jeff Steinborn

Personal details
- Party: Republican
- Education: New Mexico State University; University of Arizona

Lee S. Cotter is an American politician and a Republican member of the New Mexico Senate representing District 36 since January 15, 2013.

== Education ==
Cotter earned his BS in civil engineering from New Mexico State University and his MBA from the University of Arizona.

== Elections ==
- 2012 Challenging incumbent District 36 Democratic Senator Mary Jane Garcia a third time, Cotter and Senator Garcia won their June 5, 2012 primaries; Cotter won the November 6, 2012 General election with 9,146 votes (53.9%) against Senator Garcia.
- 2004 To initially challenge Senator Garcia, Cotter was unopposed for the June 1, 2004 Republican Primary, winning with 658 votes but lost the November 2, 2004 General election to Senator Garcia.
- 2008 Cotter and Senator Garcia won their June 8, 2008 primaries, setting up a rematch; Cotter lost the November 4, 2008 General election to Senator Garcia.
