= Howie Morales =

American politician (born 1973)

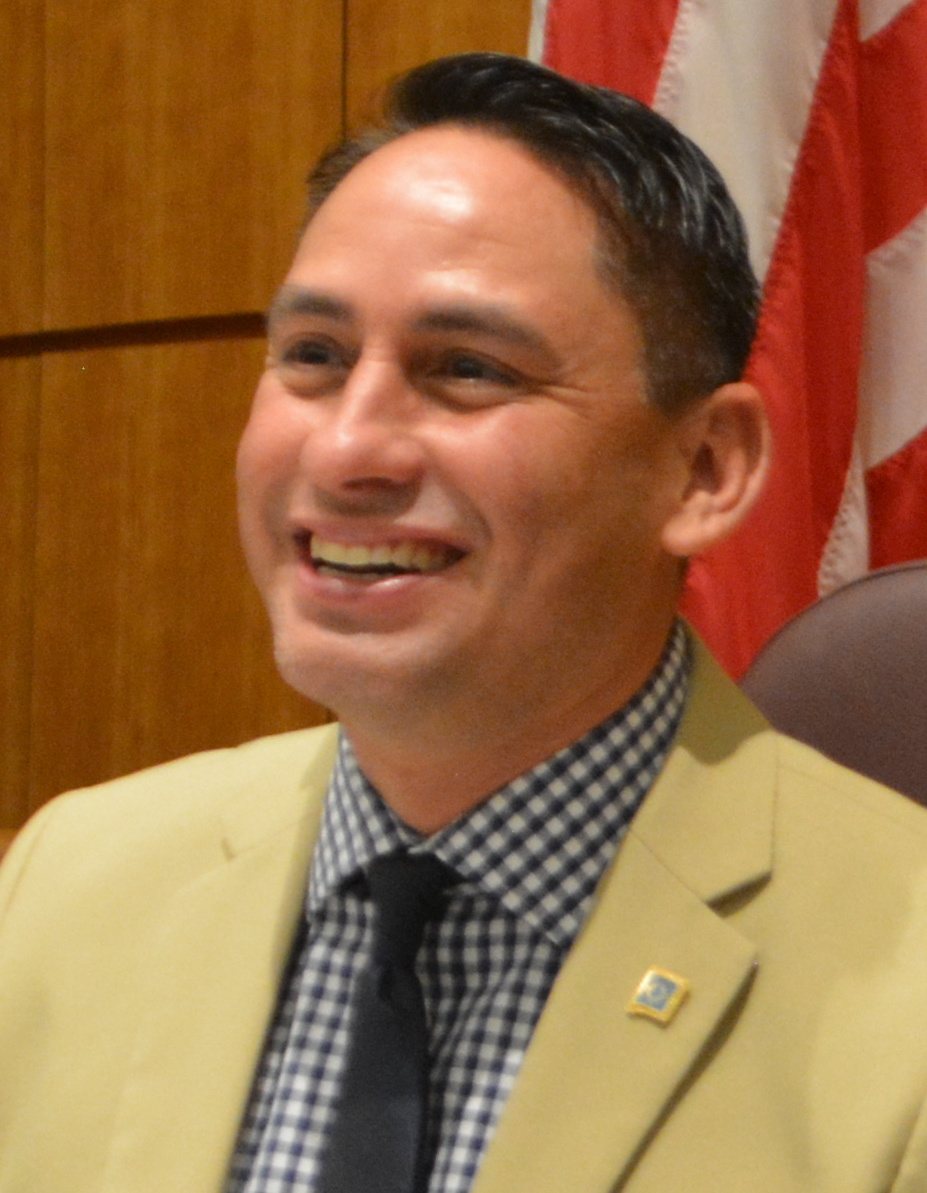
- Morales in 2019

30th Lieutenant Governor of New Mexico
- Incumbent
- Assumed office January 1, 2019
- Governor: Michelle Lujan Grisham
- Preceded by: John Sanchez

Member of the New Mexico Senate from the 28th district
- In office January 9, 2008 – January 1, 2019
- Preceded by: Ben D. Altamirano
- Succeeded by: Gabriel Ramos

Personal details
- Born: January 5, 1973 (age 53) Silver City, New Mexico, U.S.
- Party: Democratic
- Spouse: Teresa Arizaga (divorced)
- Education: Western New Mexico University (BS, MA); New Mexico State University (PhD)

Henry C. "Howie" Morales (born January 5, 1973) is an American politician and educator who has served as the 30th Lieutenant Governor of New Mexico since 2019. A member of the Democratic Party, he previously served as the New Mexico State Senator from the 28th district, which includes Catron County, Grant County and Socorro County, from 2008 until 2019.

== Early life and education ==
Morales was raised in Silver City, New Mexico. His father was a copper miner and his mother was a school education assistant. Morales worked as a shoe salesman to help support his family.

Morales earned a Bachelor of Science and Master of Arts in bilingual special education from Western New Mexico University. In 2007, he earned his Doctor of Philosophy in curriculum and instruction (with an emphasis of computer learning technologies and management and leadership) from New Mexico State University.

== Career ==
=== Early career ===
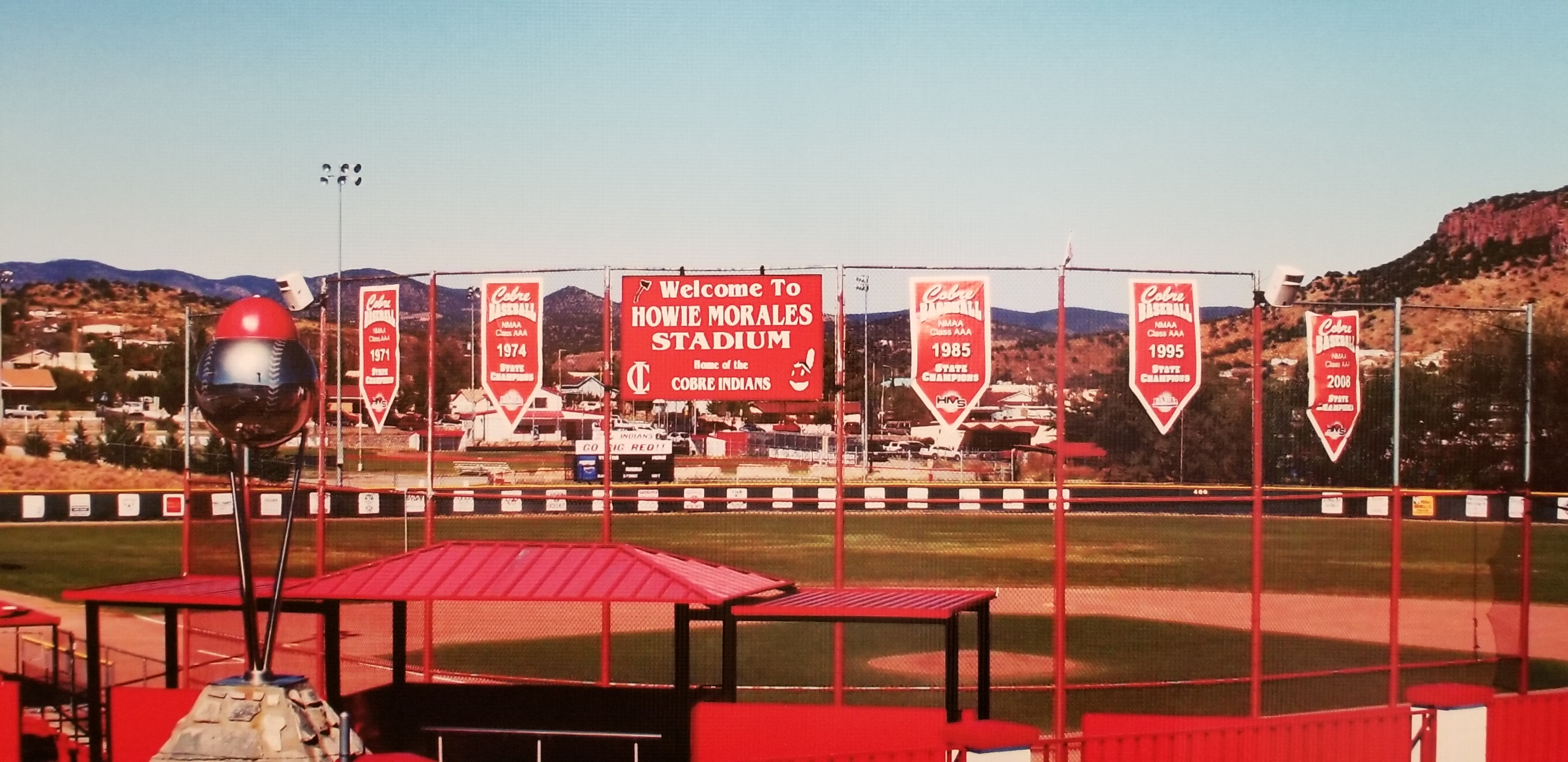
Howie Morales Stadium, Bayard, New Mexico

Morales was an educator at Grant County public schools before entering politics. From 1995 to 2000, Morales was a special education teacher in Silver City; from 2000 to 2005, he was the special education and transition coordinator for the Cobre School District. Morales was later an educator/administrator at Gila Regional Medical Center. Morales is a long-serving volunteer with Big Brothers/Big Sisters of Grant County.

Morales was inducted into the New Mexico High School Baseball Coaches Hall of Fame in December 2017 in recognition of his successful career as a high school baseball coach. Morales was a baseball coach at Silver High School and Cobre High School in Grant County, including being the youngest head coach in New Mexico to reach 200 wins. Morales retired in 2009 with a 203–49 coaching record. Morales' team won a state title in 2008, and he coached his team as state runners-up in 2002, 2007, and 2009. He was also part of seven district championships and seven regional championships as a head coach. A baseball stadium in Bayard, New Mexico is named in his honor.

Morales was a county clerk for Grant County. Elected in 2004, he served in that role from 2005 to 2008.

=== New Mexico Senate ===
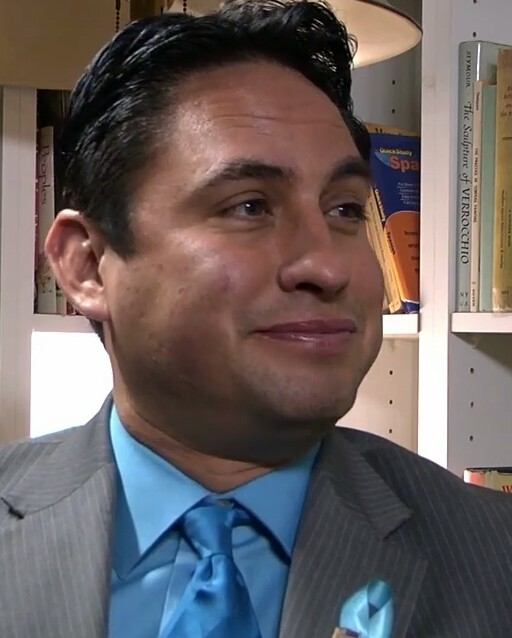
Morales in 2014

On December 27, 2007, New Mexico State Senator Ben D. Altamirano died of a heart attack. On January 9, 2008, Governor Bill Richardson appointed Morales to the vacant position that Altamirano held since 1971, on the recommendation of the Altamirano family. Morales ran for the office that he was appointed to in the 2008 general elections and defeated Republican Joseph Gros, 9,561 to 4,019, to retain his seat. He was reelected in 2012. Morales became a hospital administrator after joining the Senate.

In October 2013, Morales announced he would run for governor in the 2014 New Mexico gubernatorial election. Morales lost the five-way 2014 Democratic primary election, coming in fourth place: state Attorney General Gary King won the nomination with about 35% of the vote, Santa Fe Mayor Alan Webber received about 23%, Lawrence Rael received about 20%, Morales received about 14%, and Linda M. Lopez received about 8%.

During his 11-year career in the New Mexico Senate, Morales was a member of the Legislative Finance Committee. Morales sponsored legislation to create a universal, state-level single-payer healthcare system for New Mexico. Morales was an outspoken critic of the Martinez administration's education policies that emphasized standardized testing, and he opposed use of the PARCC assessment. He spoke out frequently against cuts to public education. Morales criticized the introduction of a teacher evaluation system that relied heavily on student performance on the new standardized test (PARCC) in the state's public schools, and he questioned the methodology of the A-to-F school grading system instituted by the Martinez administration. In 2018 Morales sponsored legislation to substantially increase the tax on cigarettes, vaping and tobacco products in order to generate $89 million additional for public schools. Legislation introduced by Morales in 2017 sought to create a new cabinet-level Early Childhood Services Department with oversight of already-existing early childhood education programs like home visiting and pre-kindergarten that were scattered through various state agencies. In 2019, Gov. Lujan Grisham and the New Mexico Legislature created the Early Childhood Education and Care Department. The Department officially launched on July 1, 2020. On environmental policy, Morales staunchly opposed controversial federal plans to divert the Gila River in western New Mexico, often described as the last wild river in the West, and he pushed for alternatives to wholesale diversion.

=== Lieutenant governor of New Mexico ===
==== Election ====
In December 2017, Morales announced his candidacy for the office of the Lieutenant Governor of New Mexico. Under the slogan "New Day for New Mexico," Morales called for policies to create more jobs and economic growth, stronger classrooms and student achievement, and strong protections of air, water and land. He was endorsed by the Santa Fe New Mexican.

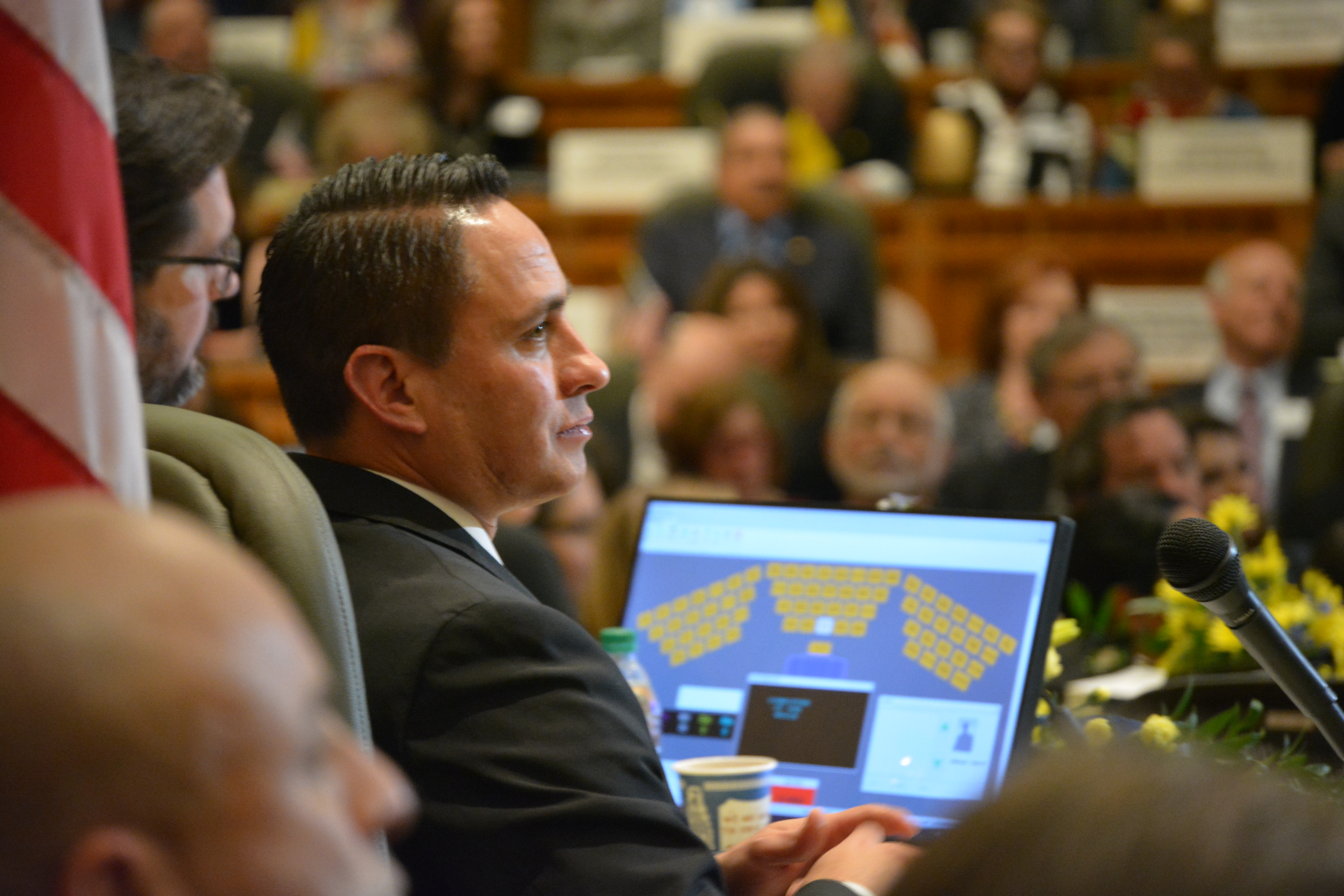
Lt. Governor Howie Morales Presiding in the Senate

On June 5, 2018, Morales defeated former Majority Leader of the New Mexico House of Representatives Rick Miera and Doña Ana County Commissioner Billy Garrett in the Democratic primary contest. Morales received 47.1% of the vote, and won all but three counties.

In the November 6, 2018 general election, the Michelle Lujan Grisham/Morales ticket won election as governor and lieutenant governor, respectively, winning 57.2% of the vote and defeating the Republican ticket of Steve Pearce and Michelle Garcia Holmes.

In November 2022, Morales was re-elected with Governor Michelle Lujan Grisham.

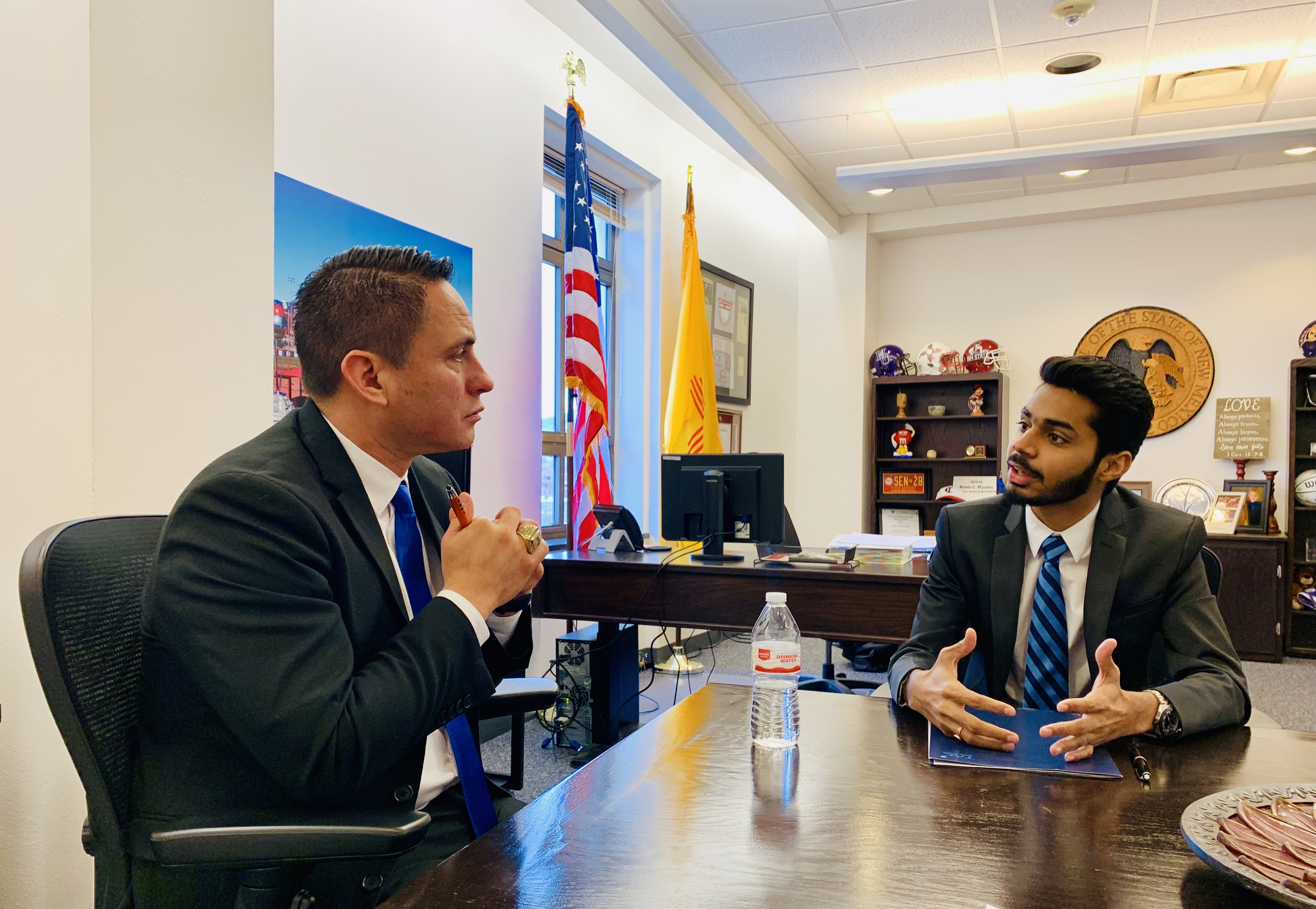
Morales with Trishneet Arora, February 2019

==== Tenure ====
As Lieutenant Governor, Howie Morales presides in meetings of the New Mexico Senate. In January 2019, Governor Lujan Grisham asked Morales to lead the state New Mexico Public Education Department (PED) for the first few weeks of the new administration until a permanent secretary was named.

During that period, Lujan Grisham issued two executive orders eliminating future use of the PARCC standardized test. Karen Trujillo, an educator and researcher, was named secretary at the end of January 2019. Morales promoted Lujan Grisham's education policy.

During his time in office, Howie Morales has championed more investments in quality afterschool learning and early childhood education in New Mexico.

Morales participates in the national Council of State Governments, serving as a co-chair of its Fiscal Health Subcommittee tasked with exploring policies that support resilient state budgets and the fiscal status and operations of states to ensure state governments are financially prepared for unexpected crises in the future.

In 2020, Morales was a fellow of the Hunt-Kean Leadership program, which brings together senior-level political leaders who have the knowledge, skill, and desire to be effective, equity-minded education policymakers at the state level. He continues to regularly participate in their panels and discussions on early childhood education policy.

Throughout his terms in office, Morales participated in meetings and policy discussions of the National Lieutenant Governors Association (NLGA). Morales was active in the Democratic Lieutenant Governors Association (DLGA) to help support fellow Democratic lieutenant governors across the nation, serving on the organization's Executive Committee in 2023.

In November 2023, Morales convened the first annual New Mexico Safe School Summit (NMS3), a multi-agency effort focused on school safety. The Summit featured a broad discussion of how to better protect New Mexico students and schools, Pre-K/Elementary to higher education, and how to empower and train communities to create safe school environments conducive to more learning.

== See also ==
- Demographics of the Democratic Party (United States) — Hispanic and Latino Americans
- List of minority governors and lieutenant governors in the United States

Political offices
Preceded by John Sanchez	Lieutenant Governor of New Mexico; 2019–present	Incumbent
Party political offices
Preceded by Deb Haaland	Democratic nominee for Lieutenant Governor of New Mexico; 2018, 2022	Succeeded by Maggie Toulouse Oliver; Withdrew
