= Ron Griggs =

American politician (born 1952)

Member of the New Mexico Senate from the 34th district
- In office December 11, 2012 – December 31, 2024
- Preceded by: Vernon Asbill
- Succeeded by: James G. Townsend

Personal details
- Born: 1952 (age 73–74) Portales, New Mexico, U.S.
- Party: Republican
- Education: New Mexico State University Alamogordo; New Mexico State University

Ron Griggs is an American politician who served as a Republican member of the New Mexico Senate, representing district 34 from 2012 to 2024. He was elected to the seat in the November 6, 2012 general election but was appointed by Governor Susana Martinez to fill the vacancy caused by the resignation of Vernon Asbill, effective December 11, 2012. Griggs was previously Mayor of Alamogordo and owner of the Alamogordo Title Company.

== Education ==
Griggs attended New Mexico State University Alamogordo and earned his BBA from New Mexico State University.

== Elections ==
=== 2012 ===
When District 34 Senator Vernon Asbill retired and left the seat open, Griggs ran in the June 5, 2012 Republican Primary, winning with 1,783 votes (57.5%) and won the November 6, 2012 General election with 9,647 votes (67.7%) against Democratic nominee Ellen Wedum, who had previously run for a New Mexico House of Representatives seat in 2006, 2008, and 2010.

=== 2016 ===
Griggs announced he would run for reelection on February 29, 2016. In his reelection announcement, Griggs emphasized job creation and his success in obtaining capital funding for roads, public infrastructure, and other projects in his district.
