= Michael Padilla =

American politician (born 1972)

Member of the New Mexico Senate from the 14th district
- Incumbent
- Assumed office January 15, 2013
- Preceded by: Eric Griego

Personal details
- Born: June 13, 1972 (age 54) Albuquerque, New Mexico, U.S.
- Party: Democratic
- Education: University of New Mexico; University of Phoenix
- Profession: Business owner
- Website: votepadilla.com

Michael Padilla (born June 13, 1972) is an American politician who served as a Democratic member of the New Mexico Senate representing District 14 since January 15, 2013. Padilla is the Senate Majority Whip.

== Early life and education ==
Padilla grew up in Los Padillas, a rural farming community that his family helped settle over 150 years ago, and is located inside of the district he represents. He is the youngest of five children. Padilla and his siblings grew up in the All Faiths Receiving Home for Homeless Children and with various family members because his parents were unable to raise them.

Padilla graduated from the University of New Mexico and University of Phoenix.

== Career ==
Before beginning his legislative career, Padilla had been involved in the Democratic Party of New Mexico as a precinct chairman, ward chairman, county central member, and state central committee member. He also served on numerous boards and commissions prior to becoming a senator, including Youth Development Incorporated, Special Olympics New Mexico, Junior Achievement of New Mexico, Association of Commerce and Industry of New Mexico, and the New Mexico Workforce Development Board.

Padilla founded Altivus CRM Solutions, a contact center and consulting firm, which specializes in building call centers and providing a number of operational consulting services. He says the company has created over 3,000 jobs in the past sixteen years. Padilla still serves as chairman and CEO of the company.

Padilla also overhauled the 311 Citizen Contact Center concept at the City of Albuquerque. Mayor Martin Chavez said Padilla "just did a marvelous job, he put the best call center together in the country." However, a 2007 investigation by the city determined Padilla repeatedly asked an employee out on dates and made sexist comments to other women.

Padilla's primary focuses as a legislator are early childhood education, jobs and economic growth, water management and conservation, science and technology deployment, and child safety and protective services. Padilla serves on nine legislative committees. He is the vice chair of the interim Science, Technology, and Telecommunications Committee and is the Senate Majority Whip.

Padilla introduced the "Hunger-Free Students' Bill of Rights Act" during the 2017 regular legislative session, which prohibits any kind of humiliation, discrimination, or punishment of children whose parents did not pay the school lunch fees. The bill was signed into law by Governor Susana Martinez. Padilla explained that when he was child, he had to scrub the floor and work in the school kitchen to compensate the school for his parents' debts. He claimed he was shocked that children were still being humiliated in school cafeterias 30 years later. According to him, the new laws shift all responsibility to the parents who did not pay and will protect children from "lunch-shaming" in New Mexico schools.

Padilla announced he was running in 2018 for the lieutenant governor position being vacated by John Sanchez, who was term-limited.

=== Sexual harassment allegations ===
In 2010, a group of 911 center employees sued the City of Albuquerque in federal court, alleging that Padilla, who at the time was tasked with improving the center's operations, sexually harassed employees and created a hostile work environment. Other suits were filed claiming violation of civil rights, discrimination, and retaliation.

Padilla allegedly told women in his office that "it may be 2007 out there, but in my house it is the 1950s and women stay home, make tortillas and have babies." After they complained, the women said they were retaliated against and demoted. The plaintiffs also argued the city was negligent by not uncovering other sexual harassment allegations against Padilla at former workplaces.

According to The Albuquerque Journal, two women settled for $149,000. A third won a federal civil rights lawsuit that cost the city $102,200 for legal fees and counseling for the woman. Padilla maintained that he was innocent and said he had been "railroaded" by the employees.

Sexual harassment claims against Padilla became an issue in the 2012 Democratic Primary when one of his opponents sent a mailer to voters that references Padilla's "sordid history."

Padilla's Democratic senate colleagues voted to remove him from his leadership position as minority whip due to the allegations, although he remained a member of the senate.

== Elections ==
- 2016 Padilla had no opposition in the general election and received 9,668 votes.
- 2012 Redistricted to District 14, and with incumbent Senator Eric Griego leaving the Legislature and leaving the seat open, Padilla ran in the three-way June 5, 2012 Democratic Primary, winning with 1,065 votes (40.4%) ahead of Representative Eleanor Chavez and former Senator James Taylor; Padilla won the November 6, 2012 General election with 8,258 votes (70.7%) against Independent nominee Robert Schiller.
