= Pat Woods (politician) =

American politician

Member of the New Mexico Senate from the 7th district
- Incumbent
- Assumed office October 25, 2012
- Preceded by: Clinton Harden

Personal details
- Born: 1948 or 1949 (age 76–77)
- Party: Republican
- Education: New Mexico State University
- Website: woods4senate.com

John Patrick "Pat" Woods (born 1948 or 1949) is an American politician and a Republican member of the New Mexico Senate representing District 7. He was appointed on October 25, 2012 by Governor of New Mexico Susana Martinez to fill the vacancy caused by the resignation of Senator Clinton Harden.

== Education ==
Woods earned his BS in agricultural economics and business administration from New Mexico State University.

== Elections ==
- 2012 When District 7 incumbent Republican Senator Harden retired and left the seat open, Woods ran in the three-way June 5, 2012 Republican Primary, winning with 2,296 votes (52%) and was unopposed for the November 6, 2012 General election, winning with 12,595 votes.

== Controversy ==
In August 2020, a rally held at Albuquerque claiming to honor the far-right militia group New Mexico Civil Guard was attended by some Republicans. Woods described the rally as a "GOP grand opening event, paying special tribute to NM law enforcement and the New Mexico Civil Guard."
