= 2024 New Mexico Senate election =

- November 5, 2024

All 42 seats in the New Mexico Senate 22 seats needed for a majority
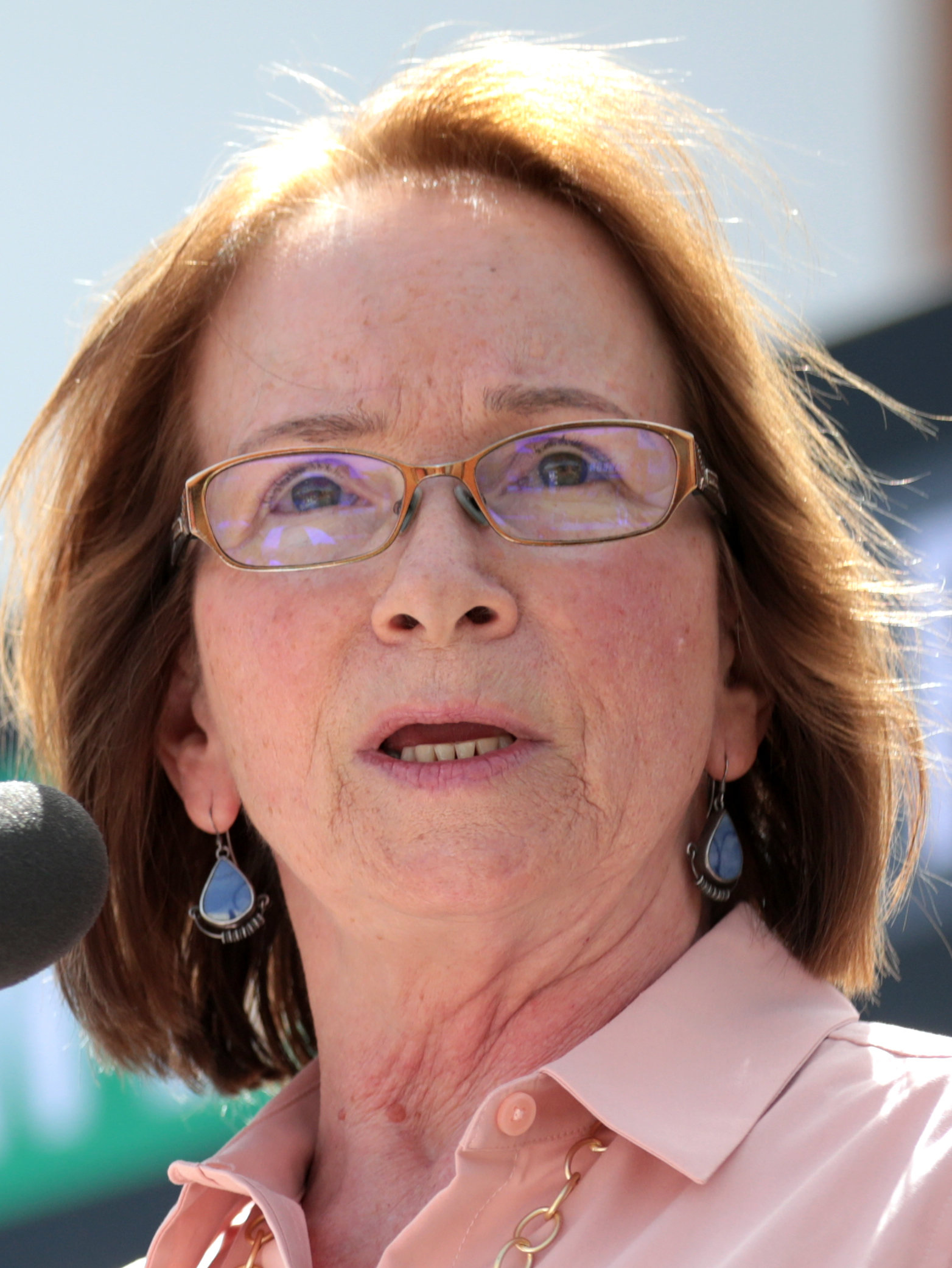

	Majority party	Minority party
Leader	Mimi Stewart	Gregory Baca (Retired)
Party	Democratic	Republican
Leader's seat	17th - Albuquerque	29th - Belen
Seats before	27	15
Seats won	26	16
Seat change	▼1	▲1
Popular vote	448,818	317,141
Percentage	58.60%	41.40%
- Democratic gain Republican gain Democratic hold Republican hold Republican: 50–60% 70–80% >90% Democratic: 50–60% 60–70% >90%
President pro tempore before election
Mimi Stewart
Democratic
Elected President pro tempore
Mimi Stewart
Democratic

The 2024 New Mexico Senate elections were held on November 5, 2024, alongside the 2024 United States elections.

A primary election on June 4, 2024 determined which candidates appeared on the November 3 general election ballot.

== Results ==
District	Incumbent	Party	Elected senator	Party
1	William Sharer	Rep	William Sharer (Note: Unopposed in the November general election.)	Rep
2	Steven Neville	Rep	Steve Lanier	Rep
3	Shannon Pinto	Dem	Shannon Pinto	Dem
4	George Muñoz	Dem	George Muñoz	Dem
5	Leo Jaramillo	Dem	Leo Jaramillo	Dem
6	Roberto Gonzales	Dem	Roberto Gonzales	Dem
7	Pat Woods	Rep	Pat Woods	Rep
8	Pete Campos	Dem	Pete Campos	Dem
9	Brenda McKenna	Dem	Cindy Nava	Dem
10	Katy Duhigg	Dem	Katy Duhigg	Dem
11	Linda Lopez	Dem	Linda Lopez	Dem
12	New Seat		Jay Block	Rep
13	Bill O'Neill	Dem	Debbie O'Malley	Dem
13	Jerry Ortiz y Pino (Note: Redistricted from the 12th district.)	Dem	Debbie O'Malley	Dem
14	Michael Padilla	Dem	Michael Padilla	Dem
15	Daniel Ivey-Soto	Dem	Heather Berghmans	Dem
16	Antoinette Sedillo Lopez	Dem	Antoinette Sedillo Lopez	Dem
17	Mimi Stewart	Dem	Mimi Stewart	Dem
18	Bill Tallman	Dem	Natalie Figueroa	Dem
19	Gregg Schmedes	Rep	Ant Thornton	Rep
20	Martin Hickey	Dem	Martin Hickey	Dem
21	Mark Moores	Rep	Nicole Tobiassen	Rep
22	Benny Shendo	Dem	Benny Shendo	Dem
23	Harold Pope Jr.	Dem	Harold Pope Jr.	Dem
24	Nancy Rodriguez	Dem	Linda Trujillo	Dem
25	Peter Wirth	Dem	Peter Wirth	Dem
26	Moe Maestas	Dem	Moe Maestas	Dem
27	Greg Nibert	Rep	Pat Boone	Rep
28	Siah Correa Hemphill	Dem	Gabriel Ramos	Rep
29	Gregory Baca	Rep	Joshua Sanchez	Rep
29	Joshua Sanchez (Note: Redistricted from the 30th district)	Rep	Joshua Sanchez	Rep
30	New Seat		Angel Charley	Dem
31	Joe Cervantes	Dem	Joe Cervantes	Dem
32	Cliff Pirtle	Rep	Candy Ezzell	Rep
33	William Burt	Rep	Nick Paul	Rep
34	Ron Griggs	Rep	Jim Townsend	Rep
35	Crystal Brantley	Rep	Crystal Brantley	Rep
36	Jeff Steinborn	Dem	Jeff Steinborn	Dem
37	William Soules	Dem	William Soules	Dem
38	Carrie Hamblen	Dem	Carrie Hamblen	Dem
39	Liz Stefanics	Dem	Liz Stefanics	Dem
40	Craig Brandt	Rep	Craig Brandt	Rep
41	David Gallegos	Rep	David Gallegos	Rep
42	Steven McCutcheon II	Rep	Larry Scott	Rep

Party	Candi- dates	Votes		Seats		
Party	Candi- dates	No.	%	No.	+/–	%
Democratic	33	448,818	58.60%	26	▼1	61.90%
Republican	24	317,141	41.40%	16	▲1	38.10%
Total	57	765,959	100%	42	Steady	100%

Popular vote
Democratic	58.60%
Republican	41.40%

Senate seats
Democratic	61.90%
Republican	38.10%

== Retirements ==
Thirteen incumbent senators (eight Republicans and five Democrats) chose to not seek reelection.

=== Democrats ===
1. District 9: Brenda McKenna retired.
2. District 12: Jerry Ortiz y Pino retired.
3. District 18: Bill Tallman retired.
4. District 24: Nancy Rodriguez retired.
5. District 28: Siah Correa Hemphill retired.

=== Republicans ===
1. District 2: Steven Neville retired.
2. District 19: Gregg Schmedes retired.
3. District 21: Mark Moores retired.
4. District 27: Stuart Ingle retired.
5. District 29: Gregory Baca retired.
6. District 32: Cliff Pirtle retired.
7. District 33: William Burt retired.
8. District 34: Ron Griggs retired.

== Incumbents defeated ==
=== In primary election ===
Four incumbent senators, two Democrats and two Republicans, were defeated in the June 4 primary election.

==== Democrats ====
1. District 13: Bill O'Neill lost renomination to Debbie O'Malley.
2. District 15: Daniel Ivey-Soto lost renomination to Heather Berghmans.

==== Republicans ====
1. District 27: Greg Nibert lost nomination to a full term to Pat Boone.
2. District 42: Steve McCutcheon II lost nomination to a full term to Larry Scott.

== Predictions ==
Source	Ranking	As of
CNalysis	Solid D	April 11, 2024

== Detailed results ==
Source for primary election results: Source for general election results:

=== District 1 ===
Incumbent Republican William Sharer has represented the 1st district since 2001.

New Mexico Senate 1st District general election, 2024
Party	Candidate	Votes	%
Republican	William Sharer (incumbent)	14,505	100%
Total votes		14,505	100%
Republican hold			

=== District 2 ===
Incumbent Republican Steven Neville has represented the 2nd district since 2005. Neville isn't seeking re-election.

New Mexico Senate 2nd District general election, 2024
Party	Candidate	Votes	%
Republican	Steve Lanier	16,832	78.47%
Democratic	Songtree Pioche	4,617	21.53%
Total votes		21,449	100%
Republican hold			

=== District 3 ===
Incumbent Democrat Shannon Pinto has represented the 3rd district since 2019. Democratic primary

New Mexico Senate 3rd District Democratic primary election, 2024
Party	Candidate	Votes	%
Democratic	Shannon Pinto (incumbent)	2,291	62.89%
Democratic	Sherylene Yazzie	1,352	37.11%
Total votes		3,643	100%

General election

New Mexico Senate 3rd District general election, 2024
Party	Candidate	Votes	%
Democratic	Shannon Pinto (incumbent)	13,968	100%
Total votes		13,968	100%
Democratic hold			

=== District 4 ===
Incumbent Democrat George Muñoz has represented the 4th district since 2009. Democratic primary

New Mexico Senate 4th District Democratic primary election, 2024
Party	Candidate	Votes	%
Democratic	George Muñoz (incumbent)	3,291	78.28%
Democratic	Keith Hillock	913	21.72%
Total votes		4,204	100%

General election

New Mexico Senate 4th District general election, 2024
Party	Candidate	Votes	%
Democratic	George Muñoz (incumbent)	13,091	100%
Total votes		13,091	100%
Democratic hold			

=== District 5 ===
Incumbent Democrat Leo Jaramillo has represented the 5th district since 2021.

New Mexico Senate 5th District general election, 2024
Party	Candidate	Votes	%
Democratic	Leo Jaramillo (incumbent)	16,183	100%
Total votes		16,183	100%
Democratic hold			

=== District 6 ===
Incumbent Democrat Roberto Gonzales has represented the 6th district since 2019.

New Mexico Senate 6th District general election, 2024
Party	Candidate	Votes	%
Democratic	Roberto Gonzales (incumbent)	18,958	100%
Total votes		18,958	100%
Democratic hold			

=== District 7 ===
Incumbent Republican Pat Woods has represented the 7th district since 2012.

New Mexico Senate 7th District general election, 2024
Party	Candidate	Votes	%
Republican	Pat Woods (incumbent)	13,722	100%
Total votes		13,722	100%
Republican hold			

=== District 8 ===
Incumbent Democrat Pete Campos has represented the 8th district since 1991. Democratic primary

New Mexico Senate 8th District Democratic primary election, 2024
Party	Candidate	Votes	%
Democratic	Pete Campos (incumbent)	3,542	54.61%
Democratic	G. Michael Lopez	2,944	45.39%
Total votes		6,486	100%

General election

New Mexico Senate 8th District general election, 2024
Party	Candidate	Votes	%
Democratic	Pete Campos (incumbent)	15,016	100%
Total votes		15,016	100%
Democratic hold			

=== District 9 ===
Incumbent Democrat Brenda McKenna has represented the 9th district since 2021. McKenna isn't seeking re-election. Democratic primary

New Mexico Senate 9th District Democratic primary election, 2024
Party	Candidate	Votes	%
Democratic	Cindy Nava	2,664	54.45%
Democratic	Heather Balas	2,229	45.55%
Total votes		4,893	100%

Republican primary

New Mexico Senate 9th District Republican primary election, 2024
Party	Candidate	Votes	%
Republican	Audrey Trujillo	1,533	58.20%
Republican	Frida Susan Vasquez	1,101	41.80%
Total votes		2,634	100%

General election

New Mexico Senate 9th District general election, 2024
Party	Candidate	Votes	%
Democratic	Cindy Nava	15,588	55.85%
Republican	Audrey Trujillo	12,320	44.15%
Total votes		27,908	100%
Democratic hold			

=== District 10 ===
Incumbent Democrat Katy Duhigg has represented the 10th district since 2021.

New Mexico Senate 10th District general election, 2024
Party	Candidate	Votes	%
Democratic	Katy Duhigg (incumbent)	15,846	57.57%
Republican	Rudy Mora	11,678	42.43%
Total votes		27,524	100%
Democratic hold			

=== District 11 ===
Incumbent Democrat Linda Lopez has represented the 11th district since 1997. Democratic primary

New Mexico Senate 11th District Democratic primary election, 2024
Party	Candidate	Votes	%
Democratic	Linda Lopez (incumbent)	1,447	81.34%
Democratic	Richard Carrion	332	18.66%
Total votes		1,779	100%

General election

New Mexico Senate 11th District general election, 2024
Party	Candidate	Votes	%
Democratic	Linda Lopez (incumbent)	9,665	100%
Total votes		9,665	100%
Democratic hold			

=== District 12 ===
The new 12th district includes parts of northern Bernalillo County and southern Sandoval County. The district has no incumbent. Republican primary

New Mexico Senate 12th District Republican primary election, 2024
Party	Candidate	Votes	%
Republican	Jay Block	1,929	67.95%
Republican	Candace Gould	910	32.05%
Total votes		2,839	100%

General election

New Mexico Senate 12th District general election, 2024
Party	Candidate	Votes	%
Republican	Jay Block	13,643	52.42%
Democratic	Phillip Ramirez	12,382	47.58%
Total votes		26,025	100%
Republican win (new seat)			

=== District 13 ===
The new 13th district includes the homes of incumbent Democrats Bill O'Neill, who has represented the 13th district since 2013, and Jerry Ortiz y Pino, who has represented the 12th district since 2005. Ortiz y Pino did not seek re-election. O'Neill lost re-nomination to fellow Republican Debbie O'Malley. Democratic primary

New Mexico Senate 13th District Democratic primary election, 2024
Party	Candidate	Votes	%
Democratic	Debbie O'Malley	2,300	51.95%
Democratic	Bill O'Neill (incumbent)	2,127	48.05%
Total votes		4,427	100%

General election

New Mexico Senate 13th District general election, 2024
Party	Candidate	Votes	%
Democratic	Debbie O'Malley	14,921	100%
Total votes		14,921	100%
Democratic hold			

=== District 14 ===
Incumbent Democrat Michael Padilla has represented the 14th district since 2013.

New Mexico Senate 14th District general election, 2024
Party	Candidate	Votes	%
Democratic	Michael Padilla (incumbent)	11,349	100%
Total votes		11,349	100%
Democratic hold			

=== District 15 ===
Incumbent Democrat Daniel Ivey-Soto has represented the 15th district since 2013. Democratic primary

New Mexico Senate 15th District Democratic primary election, 2024
Party	Candidate	Votes	%
Democratic	Heather Berghmans	2,970	79.97%
Democratic	Daniel Ivey-Soto (incumbent)	744	20.03%
Total votes		3,714	100%

General election

New Mexico Senate 15th District general election, 2024
Party	Candidate	Votes	%
Democratic	Heather Berghmans	12,920	60.68%
Republican	Craig Degenhardt	8,371	39.32%
Total votes		21,291	100%
Democratic hold			

=== District 16 ===
Incumbent Democrat Antoinette Sedillo Lopez has represented the 16th district since 2019.

New Mexico Senate 16th District general election, 2024
Party	Candidate	Votes	%
Democratic	Antoinette Sedillo Lopez (incumbent)	18,219	100%
Total votes		18,219	100%
Democratic hold			

=== District 17 ===
Incumbent Democrat Mimi Stewart has represented the 17th district since 2015.

New Mexico Senate 17th District general election, 2024
Party	Candidate	Votes	%
Democratic	Mimi Stewart (incumbent)	9,117	100%
Total votes		9,117	100%
Democratic hold			

=== District 18 ===
Incumbent Democrat Bill Tallman has represented the 18th district since 2017. Tallman isn't seeking re-election.

New Mexico Senate 18th District general election, 2024
Party	Candidate	Votes	%
Democratic	Natalie Figueroa	15,131	58.04%
Republican	Kurstin Johnson	10,938	41.96%
Total votes		26,069	100%
Democratic hold			

=== District 19 ===
Incumbent Republican Gregg Schmedes has represented the 19th district since 2021. Schemedes isn't seeking re-election.

New Mexico Senate 19th District general election, 2024
Party	Candidate	Votes	%
Republican	Ant Thornton	17,400	57.02%
Democratic	William Burton Scott	13,115	42.98%
Total votes		30,515	100%
Republican hold			

=== District 20 ===
Incumbent Democrat Martin Hickey has represented the 20th district since 2021.

New Mexico Senate 20th District general election, 2024
Party	Candidate	Votes	%
Democratic	Martin Hickey (incumbent)	14,222	57.53%
Republican	Wayne Yevoli	10,497	42.47%
Total votes		24,719	100%
Democratic hold			

=== District 21 ===
Incumbent Republican Mark Moores has represented the 21st district since 2013. Moores isn't seeking re-election. Democratic primary

New Mexico Senate 21st District Democratic primary election, 2024
Party	Candidate	Votes	%
Democratic	Athena Ann Christodoulou	2,827	76.10%
Democratic	Philip Snedeker	888	23.90%
Total votes		3,715	100%

Republican primary

New Mexico Senate 21st District Republican primary election, 2024
Party	Candidate	Votes	%
Republican	Nicole Tobiassen	1,832	43.95%
Republican	Michael Wiener	1,269	30.45%
Republican	John Morton	1,067	25.60%
Total votes		4,168	100%

General election

New Mexico Senate 21st District general election, 2024
Party	Candidate	Votes	%
Republican	Nicole Tobiassen	15,719	52.81%
Democratic	Athena Ann Christodoulou	14,048	47.19%
Total votes		29,767	100%
Republican hold			

=== District 22 ===
Incumbent Democrat Benny Shendo has represented the 22nd district since 2013.

New Mexico Senate 22nd District general election, 2024
Party	Candidate	Votes	%
Democratic	Benny Shendo (incumbent)	13,989	100%
Total votes		13,989	100%
Democratic hold			

=== District 23 ===
Incumbent Democrat Harold Pope Jr. has represented the 23rd district since 2021. Republican primary

New Mexico Senate 23rd District Republican primary election, 2024
Party	Candidate	Votes	%
Republican	Terry Lynne Aragon	1,018	58.01%
Republican	Manuel "Manny' Gonzales III	737	41.99%
Total votes		1,755	100%

General election

New Mexico Senate 23rd District general election, 2024
Party	Candidate	Votes	%
Democratic	Harold Pope Jr. (incumbent)	13,267	53.38%
Republican	Terry Lynne Aragon	11,586	46.62%
Total votes		24,853	100%
Democratic hold			

=== District 24 ===
Incumbent Democrat Nancy Rodriguez has represented the 24th district since 1996. Rodriguez isn't seeking re-election. Democratic primary

New Mexico Senate 24th District Democratic primary election, 2024
Party	Candidate	Votes	%
Democratic	Linda Trujillo	3,704	61.87%
Democratic	Anna Hansen	1,357	22.67%
Democratic	Veronica Ray Krupnick	926	15.47%
Total votes		5,987	100%

General election

New Mexico Senate 24th District general election, 2024
Party	Candidate	Votes	%
Democratic	Linda Trujillo	18,058	100%
Total votes		18,058	100%
Democratic hold			

=== District 25 ===
Incumbent Democrat and Majority Leader Peter Wirth has represented the 25th district since 2009.

New Mexico Senate 25th District general election, 2024
Party	Candidate	Votes	%
Democratic	Peter Wirth (incumbent)	28,249	100%
Total votes		28,249	100%
Democratic hold			

=== District 26 ===
Incumbent Democrat Moe Maestas has represented the 26th district since his appointment in 2022. Democratic primary

New Mexico Senate 26th District Democratic primary election, 2024
Party	Candidate	Votes	%
Democratic	Moe Maestas (incumbent)	2,029	59.22%
Democratic	Julie Radoslovich	1,397	40.78%
Total votes		3,426	100%

General election

New Mexico Senate 26th District general election, 2024
Party	Candidate	Votes	%
Democratic	Moe Maestas (incumbent)	13,716	100%
Total votes		13,716	100%
Democratic hold			

=== District 27 ===
Incumbent Republican Greg Nibert has represented the 27th district since his appointment in 2024. Nibert lost re-nomination to fellow Republican Patrick Boone IV. Republican primary

New Mexico Senate 27th District Republican primary election, 2024
Party	Candidate	Votes	%
Republican	Pat Boone	2,444	43.22%
Republican	Greg Nibert (incumbent)	2,341	41.40%
Republican	Larry Marker	870	15.38%
Total votes		5,655	100%

General election

New Mexico Senate 27th District general election, 2024
Party	Candidate	Votes	%
Republican	Pat Boone	16,093	100%
Total votes		16,093	100%
Republican hold			

=== District 28 ===
Incumbent Democrat Siah Correa Hemphill has represented the 28th district since 2021. Correa Hemphill withdrew after the primary.

New Mexico Senate 28th District general election, 2024
Party	Candidate	Votes	%
Republican	Gabriel Ramos	11,386	55.42%
Democratic	Chris Ponce	9,159	44.58%
Total votes		20,545	100%
Republican gain from Democratic			

=== District 29 ===
The new 29th district includes the home of incumbent Republican and Minority Leader Gregory Baca, who has represented the 29th district since 2017, and incumbent Republican Joshua Sanchez, who has represented the 30th district since 2021. Baca isn't seeking re-election.

New Mexico Senate 29th District general election, 2024
Party	Candidate	Votes	%
Republican	Joshua Sanchez (incumbent)	13,605	59.30%
Democratic	Tina Garcia	9,337	40.70%
Total votes		22,942	100%
Republican hold			

=== District 30 ===
The new 30th district includes parts of Cibola, Socorro, Valencia, and Bernalillo counties and has no incumbent. Democratic primary

New Mexico Senate 30th District Democratic primary election, 2024
Party	Candidate	Votes	%
Democratic	Angel Charley	1,934	63.31%
Democratic	Clemente Sanchez	1,121	36.69%
Total votes		3,055	100%

General election

New Mexico Senate 30th District general election, 2024
Party	Candidate	Votes	%
Democratic	Angel Charley	11,756	100%
Total votes		11,756	100%
Democratic win (new seat)			

=== District 31 ===
Incumbent Democrat Joe Cervantes has represented the 31st district since 2012.

New Mexico Senate 31st District general election, 2024
Party	Candidate	Votes	%
Democratic	Joe Cervantes (incumbent)	8,853	100%
Total votes		8,853	100%
Democratic hold			

=== District 32 ===
Incumbent Republican Cliff Pirtle has represented the 32nd district since 2013. Pirtle isn't seeking re-election. Republican primary

New Mexico Senate 32nd District Republican primary election, 2024
Party	Candidate	Votes	%
Republican	Candy Ezzell	1,931	57.90%
Republican	Chad Hamill	1,404	42.10%
Total votes		3,335	100%

General election

New Mexico Senate 32nd District general election, 2024
Party	Candidate	Votes	%
Republican	Candy Ezzell	12,484	100%
Total votes		12,484	100%
Republican hold			

=== District 33 ===
Incumbent Republican William Burt has represented the 33rd district and its predecessors since 2011. Burt isn't seeking re-election. Republican primary

New Mexico Senate 33rd District Republican primary election, 2024
Party	Candidate	Votes	%
Republican	Nick Paul	2,644	50.29%
Republican	Lynn Crawford	1,560	29.67%
Republican	Rhonda Beth Romack	1,054	20.05%
Total votes		5,258	100%

General election

New Mexico Senate New Mexico Senate 33rd District general election, 2024
Party	Candidate	Votes	%
Republican	Nick Paul	16,258	100%
Total votes		16,258	100%
Republican hold			

=== District 34 ===
Incumbent Republican Ron Griggs has represented the 34th district since 2012. Griggs isn't seeking re-election.

New Mexico Senate 34th District general election, 2024
Party	Candidate	Votes	%
Republican	Jim Townsend	14,062	100%
Total votes		14,062	100%
Republican hold			

=== District 35 ===
Incumbent Republican Crystal Brantley has represented the 35th district since 2021.

New Mexico Senate 35th District general election, 2024
Party	Candidate	Votes	%
Republican	Crystal Brantley (incumbent)	17,820	100%
Total votes		17,820	100%
Republican hold			

=== District 36 ===
Incumbent Democrat Jeff Steinborn has represented the 36th district since 2017.

New Mexico Senate 36th District general election, 2024
Party	Candidate	Votes	%
Democratic	Jeff Steinborn (incumbent)	11,154	55.92%
Republican	David Tofsted	8,792	44.08%
Total votes		19,946	100%
Democratic hold			

=== District 37 ===
Incumbent Democrat William Soules has represented the 37th district since 2013.

New Mexico Senate 37th District general election, 2024
Party	Candidate	Votes	%
Democratic	William Soules (incumbent)	15,693	100%
Total votes		15,693	100%
Democratic hold			

=== District 38 ===
Incumbent Democrat Carrie Hamblen has represented the 38th district since 2021.

New Mexico Senate 38th District general election, 2024
Party	Candidate	Votes	%
Democratic	Carrie Hamblen (incumbent)	8,643	50.88%
Republican	Samantha Barncastle Salopek	8,345	49.12%
Total votes		16,988	100%
Democratic hold			

=== District 39 ===
Incumbent Democrat Liz Stefanics has represented the 39th district since 2017.

New Mexico Senate 39th District general election, 2024
Party	Candidate	Votes	%
Democratic	Liz Stefanics (incumbent)	16,371	100%
Total votes		16,371	100%
Democratic hold			

=== District 40 ===
Incumbent Republican Craig Brandt has represented the 40th district since 2013.

New Mexico Senate 40th District general election, 2024
Party	Candidate	Votes	%
Republican	Craig Brandt (incumbent)	14,345	54.01%
Democratic	Amina Everett	12,217	45.99%
Total votes		26,562	100%
Republican hold			

=== District 41 ===
Incumbent Republican David Gallegos has represented the 41st district since 2021.

New Mexico Senate 41st District general election, 2024
Party	Candidate	Votes	%
Republican	David Gallegos (incumbent)	11,157	100%
Total votes		11,157	100%
Republican hold			

=== District 42 ===
Incumbent Republican Steve McCutcheon II has represented the 42nd district since his appointment in 2023. McCutcheon lost re-nomination to fellow Republican Larry Scott. Republican primary

New Mexico Senate 42nd District Republican primary election, 2024
Party	Candidate	Votes	%
Republican	Larry Scott	3,226	61.02%
Republican	Steve McCutcheon II (incumbent)	2,061	38.98%
Total votes		5,287	100%

General election

New Mexico Senate 42nd District general election, 2024
Party	Candidate	Votes	%
Republican	Larry Scott	15,583	100%
Total votes		15,583	100%
Republican hold			
