= 2020 New Mexico Senate election =

- November 3, 2020

All 42 seats in the New Mexico Senate 22 seats needed for a majority
	Majority party	Minority party
Leader	Mary Kay Papen (Lost re-nomination)	Stuart Ingle
Party	Democratic	Republican
Leader's seat	38th - Las Cruces	27th - Portales
Seats before	26	16
Seats won	27	15
Seat change	▲1	▼1
Popular vote	444,518	404,488
Percentage	51.6%	47.0%
- Democratic gain Republican gain Democratic hold Republican hold 50–60% 60–70% 70–80% 80–90% >90% 50–60% 60–70% 70–80% >90%
President pro tempore before election
Mary Kay Papen
Democratic
Elected President pro tempore
Mimi Stewart
Democratic

The 2020 New Mexico Senate elections took place as part of the biennial United States elections. New Mexico voters elected state senators in all 42 of the state senate's districts. State senators serve four-year terms in the New Mexico Senate.

A primary election on June 2, 2020, determined which candidates will appear on the November 3 general election ballot.

== Results ==
District	Incumbent	Party	Elected senator	Party
1	William Sharer	Rep	William Sharer (Note: Unopposed in the November general election.)	Rep
2	Steven Neville	Rep	Steven Neville	Rep
3	Shannon Pinto	Dem	Shannon Pinto	Dem
4	George Muñoz	Dem	George Muñoz	Dem
5	Richard Martinez	Dem	Leo Jaramillo	Dem
6	Roberto Gonzales	Dem	Roberto Gonzales	Dem
7	Pat Woods	Rep	Pat Woods	Rep
8	Pete Campos	Dem	Pete Campos	Dem
9	John Sapien	Dem	Brenda McKenna	Dem
10	Candace Gould	Rep	Katy Duhigg	Dem
11	Linda Lopez	Dem	Linda Lopez	Dem
12	Jerry Ortiz y Pino	Dem	Jerry Ortiz y Pino	Dem
13	Bill O'Neill	Dem	Bill O'Neill	Dem
14	Michael Padilla	Dem	Michael Padilla	Dem
15	Daniel Ivey-Soto	Dem	Daniel Ivey-Soto	Dem
16	Antoinette Sedillo Lopez	Dem	Antoinette Sedillo Lopez	Dem
17	Mimi Stewart	Dem	Mimi Stewart	Dem
18	Bill Tallman	Dem	Bill Tallman	Dem
19	James White	Rep	Gregg Schmedes	Rep
20	William Payne	Rep	Martin Hickey	Dem
21	Mark Moores	Rep	Mark Moores	Rep
22	Benny Shendo	Dem	Benny Shendo	Dem
23	Sander Rue	Rep	Harold Pope Jr.	Dem
24	Nancy Rodriguez	Dem	Nancy Rodriguez	Dem
25	Peter Wirth	Dem	Peter Wirth	Dem
26	Jacob Candelaria	Dem	Jacob Candelaria	Dem
27	Stuart Ingle	Rep	Stuart Ingle	Rep
28	Gabriel Ramos	Dem	Siah Correa Hemphill	Dem
29	Gregory A. Baca	Rep	Gregory A. Baca	Rep
30	Clemente Sanchez	Dem	Joshua A. Sanchez	Rep
31	Joe Cervantes	Dem	Joe Cervantes	Dem
32	Cliff Pirtle	Rep	Cliff Pirtle	Rep
33	William Burt	Rep	William Burt	Rep
34	Ron Griggs	Rep	Ron Griggs	Rep
35	John Arthur Smith	Dem	Crystal Diamond	Rep
36	Jeff Steinborn	Dem	Jeff Steinborn	Dem
37	William Soules	Dem	William Soules	Dem
38	Mary Kay Papen	Dem	Carrie Hamblen	Dem
39	Liz Stefanics	Dem	Liz Stefanics	Dem
40	Craig Brandt	Rep	Craig Brandt	Rep
41	Gregg Fulfer	Rep	David Gallegos	Rep
42	Gay Kernan	Rep	Gay Kernan	Rep

=== Closest races ===
Seats where the margin of victory was under 10%:

1. District 28, 0.6%
2. District 30, 2.2% gain
3. District 29, 2.2%
4. District 23, 4.2% gain
5. District 10, 4.8% gain
6. District 21, 7.6%
7. District 9, 7.8%
8. District 20, 7.8% gain

== Retiring incumbents ==
Two incumbent senators (one Republican and one Democrat) chose to not seek reelection.

1. John Sapien (D), District 9
2. William Payne (R), District 20

== Defeated incumbents ==
=== In primary ===
Seven incumbent senators (five Democrats and two Republicans) sought reelection but were defeated in the June 2 primary. The Democrats defeated in the primary were part of a conservative faction that were targeted by progressive groups for voting with Republicans to defeat certain bills including legalizing marijuana or to pass bills limiting abortion rights. Two of the challengers who unseated the incumbents went on to lose the general election: Pamela Cordova in the 30th and Neomi Martinez-Parra in the 35th.

1. Richard Martinez (D), District 5
2. James White (R), District 19
3. Gabriel Ramos (D), District 28
4. Clemente Sanchez (D), District 30
5. John Arthur Smith (D), District 35
6. Mary Kay Papen (D), District 38
7. Gregg Fulfer (R), District 41

=== In general election ===
Two incumbent senators, both Republicans, won their respective primaries but were defeated in the November 3 general election by their Democratic opponent.

1. Candace Gould (R), District 10
2. Sander Rue (R), District 23

== Predictions ==
Source	Ranking	As of
The Cook Political Report	Safe D	October 21, 2020

== Detailed results ==
Source for primary election results: Source for general election results:

=== District 1 ===
Incumbent Republican William Sharer has represented the 1st district since 2001.

New Mexico Senate 1st District general election, 2020
Party	Candidate	Votes	%
Republican	William Sharer (incumbent)	14,506	100%
Total votes		14,506	100%
Republican hold			

=== District 2 ===
Incumbent Republican Steven Neville has represented the 2nd district since 2005.

New Mexico Senate 2nd District general election, 2020
Party	Candidate	Votes	%
Republican	Steven Neville (incumbent)	16,631	100%
Total votes		16,631	100%
Republican hold			

=== District 3 ===
Incumbent Democrat Shannon Pinto has represented the 3rd district since her appointment on July 25, 2019, after the death of Democrat John Pinto (her grandfather). She was elected to a full term. Democratic primary

New Mexico Senate 3rd District Democratic primary election, 2020
Party	Candidate	Votes	%
Democratic	Shannon Pinto (incumbent)	3,902	80.3%
Democratic	Shawn Nelson	959	19.7%
Total votes		4,861	100%

General election

New Mexico Senate 3rd District general election, 2020
Party	Candidate	Votes	%
Democratic	Shannon Pinto (incumbent)	11,932	67.4%
Republican	Arthur Allison	5,767	32.6%
Total votes		17,699	100%
Democratic hold			

=== District 4 ===
Incumbent Democrat George Muñoz has represented the 4th district since 2009. Democratic primary

New Mexico Senate 4th District Democratic primary election, 2020
Party	Candidate	Votes	%
Democratic	George Muñoz (incumbent)	3,274	58.3%
Democratic	Noreen Kelly	2,344	41.7%
Total votes		5,618	100%

General election

New Mexico Senate 4th District general election, 2020
Party	Candidate	Votes	%
Democratic	George Muñoz (incumbent)	11,931	67.8%
Republican	Angela Olive	5,660	32.2%
Total votes		17,591	100%
Democratic hold			

=== District 5 ===
Incumbent Democrat Richard Martinez has represented the 5th district since 2001. Martinez lost re-nomination to fellow Democrat Leo Jaramillo, who went on to win the general election. Democratic primary

New Mexico Senate 5th District Democratic primary election, 2020
Party	Candidate	Votes	%
Democratic	Leo Jaramillo	6,153	60.6%
Democratic	Richard Martinez (incumbent)	3,996	39.4%
Total votes		10,149	100%

General election

New Mexico Senate 5th District general election, 2020
Party	Candidate	Votes	%
Democratic	Leo Jaramillo	15,649	68.5%
Republican	Diamantina Storment	6,132	26.8%
Libertarian	Lee Weinland	1,075	4.7%
Total votes		22,856	100%
Democratic hold			

=== District 6 ===
Incumbent Democrat Roberto Gonzales has represented the 6th district since his appointment to the seat on December 20, 2019, after the death of Democrat Carlos Cisneros.

New Mexico Senate 6th District general election, 2020
Party	Candidate	Votes	%
Democratic	Roberto Gonzales (incumbent)	19,328	100%
Total votes		19,328	100%
Democratic hold			

=== District 7 ===
Incumbent Republican Pat Woods has represented the 7th district since 2012.

New Mexico Senate 7th District general election, 2020
Party	Candidate	Votes	%
Republican	Pat Woods (incumbent)	14,240	100%
Total votes		14,240	100%
Republican hold			

=== District 8 ===
Incumbent Democrat Pete Campos has represented the 8th district since 1991. Democratic primary

New Mexico Senate 8th District Democratic primary election, 2020
Party	Candidate	Votes	%
Democratic	Pete Campos (incumbent)	7,164	69.8%
Democratic	Connie Jimenez Trujillo	3,098	30.2%
Total votes		10,262	100%

General election

New Mexico Senate 8th District general election, 2020
Party	Candidate	Votes	%
Democratic	Pete Campos (incumbent)	13,438	64.9%
Republican	Melissa Fryzel	7,264	35.1%
Total votes		20,702	100%
Democratic hold			

=== District 9 ===
Incumbent Democrat John Sapien has represented the 9th district since 2009. Sapien retired and was succeeded by fellow Democrat Brenda McKenna. Democratic primary

New Mexico Senate 9th District Democratic primary election, 2020
Party	Candidate	Votes	%
Democratic	Brenda McKenna	4,177	49.9%
Democratic	Ben Rodefer	2,151	25.7%
Democratic	Kevin David Lucero	2,049	24.5%
Total votes		8,377	100%

Republican primary

New Mexico Senate 9th District Republican primary election, 2020
Party	Candidate	Votes	%
Republican	John Clark	2,833	55.1%
Republican	Bridget Condon	1,646	32.0%
Republican	Tania Dennis	659	12.8%
Total votes		5,138	100%

General election

New Mexico Senate 9th District general election, 2020
Party	Candidate	Votes	%
Democratic	Brenda McKenna	16,090	53.9%
Republican	John Clark	13,743	46.1%
Total votes		29,833	100%
Democratic hold			

=== District 10 ===
Incumbent Republican Candace Gould has represented the 10th district since 2017. Gould lost re-election to Democrat Katy Duhigg. Democratic primary

New Mexico Senate 10th District Democratic primary election, 2020
Party	Candidate	Votes	%
Democratic	Katy Duhigg	4,064	67.3%
Democratic	Alan Hill	1,974	32.7%
Total votes		6,038	100%

General election

New Mexico Senate 10th District general election, 2020
Party	Candidate	Votes	%
Democratic	Katy Duhigg	13,417	52.4%
Republican	Candace Gould (incumbent)	12,176	47.6%
Total votes		25,593	100%
Democratic gain from Republican			

=== District 11 ===
Incumbent Democrat Linda Lopez has represented the 11th district since 1997.

New Mexico Senate 11th District general election, 2020
Party	Candidate	Votes	%
Democratic	Linda Lopez (incumbent)	9,162	69.4%
Republican	Marylinda Price	4,041	30.6%
Total votes		13,203	100%
Democratic hold			

=== District 12 ===
Incumbent Democrat Jerry Ortiz y Pino has represented the 12th district since 2005.

New Mexico Senate 12th District general election, 2020
Party	Candidate	Votes	%
Democratic	Jerry Ortiz y Pino (incumbent)	13,910	77.4%
Republican	Lisa Meyer-Hagen	4,063	22.6%
Total votes		17,973	100%
Democratic hold			

=== District 13 ===
Incumbent Democrat Bill O'Neill has represented the 13th district since 2013.

New Mexico Senate 13th District general election, 2020
Party	Candidate	Votes	%
Democratic	Bill O'Neill (incumbent)	15,504	62.6%
Republican	Michaela Chavez	8,436	34.1%
Libertarian	Frederick Snoy II	824	3.3%
Total votes		24,764	100%
Democratic hold			

=== District 14 ===
Incumbent Democrat Michael Padilla has represented the 14th district since 2013.

New Mexico Senate 14th District general election, 2020
Party	Candidate	Votes	%
Democratic	Michael Padilla (incumbent)	10,083	65.8%
Republican	Mary Kay Ingham	5,250	34.2%
Total votes		15,333	100%
Democratic hold			

=== District 15 ===
Incumbent Democrat Daniel Ivey-Soto has represented the 15th district since 2013.

New Mexico Senate 15th District general election, 2020
Party	Candidate	Votes	%
Democratic	Daniel Ivey-Soto (incumbent)	13,744	60.0%
Republican	Sandra Rausch	9,167	40.0%
Total votes		22,911	100%
Democratic hold			

=== District 16 ===
Incumbent Democrat and former congressional candidate Antoinette Sedillo Lopez has represented the 16th district since her appointment on January 14, 2019, after Democrat Cisco McSorley was named head of the Probation and Parole Division of the New Mexico Corrections Department.

New Mexico Senate 16th District general election, 2020
Party	Candidate	Votes	%
Democratic	Antoinette Sedillo Lopez (incumbent)	18,303	78.1%
Republican	Chelsea Flanders	5,147	21.9%
Total votes		23,450	100%
Democratic hold			

=== District 17 ===
Incumbent Democrat Mimi Stewart has represented the 17th district since 2015. Democratic primary

New Mexico Senate 17th District Democratic primary election, 2020
Party	Candidate	Votes	%
Democratic	Mimi Stewart (incumbent)	2,247	67.5%
Democratic	Shannon Robinson	1,083	32.5%
Total votes		3,330	100%

General election

New Mexico Senate 17th District general election, 2020
Party	Candidate	Votes	%
Democratic	Mimi Stewart (incumbent)	8,686	65.7%
Republican	Rodney Deskin	4,531	34.3%
Total votes		13,217	100%
Democratic hold			

=== District 18 ===
Incumbent Democrat Bill Tallman has represented the 18th district since 2017.

New Mexico Senate 18th District general election, 2020
Party	Candidate	Votes	%
Democratic	Bill Tallman (incumbent)	14,598	55.0%
Republican	Ryan Alexandra Chavez	11,955	45.0%
Libertarian	Michael Cordova	0	0.0
Total votes		26,553	100%
Democratic hold			

=== District 19 ===
Incumbent Republican James White has represented the 19th district since 2016. White lost re-nomination to fellow Republican Gregg Schmedes, who went on to win the general election. Republican primary

New Mexico Senate 19th District Republican primary election, 2020
Party	Candidate	Votes	%
Republican	Gregg Schmedes	3,733	54.3%
Republican	James White (incumbent)	3,148	45.7%
Total votes		6,881	100%

General election

New Mexico Senate 19th District general election, 2020
Party	Candidate	Votes	%
Republican	Gregg Schmedes	15,536	53.8%
Democratic	Claudia Risner	12,108	41.9%
Libertarian	John McDivitt	1,243	4.3%
Total votes		28,887	100%
Republican hold			

=== District 20 ===
Incumbent Republican William Payne has represented the 20th district since 1997. Payne retired and Democrat Martin Hickey won the open seat. Republican primary

New Mexico Senate 20th District Republican primary election, 2020
Party	Candidate	Votes	%
Republican	John Morton	3,072	55.9%
Republican	Karin Foster	2,426	44.1%
Total votes		5,498	100%

Democratic primary

New Mexico Senate 20th District Democratic primary election, 2020
Party	Candidate	Votes	%
Democratic	Martin Hickey	2,249	32.2%
Democratic	Rebecca Stair	2,102	30.1%
Democratic	Idalia Lechuga-Tena	1,532	21.9%
Democratic	Nancy Savage	1,099	15.7%
Total votes		6,982	100%

General election

New Mexico Senate 20th District general election, 2020
Party	Candidate	Votes	%
Democratic	Martin Hickey	14,931	53.9%
Republican	John Morton	12,752	46.1%
Total votes		27,683	100%
Democratic gain from Republican			

=== District 21 ===
Incumbent Republican Mark Moores has represented the 21st district since 2013.

New Mexico Senate 21st District general election, 2020
Party	Candidate	Votes	%
Republican	Mark Moores (incumbent)	15,425	53.3%
Democratic	Athena Ann Christodoulou	13,509	46.7%
Total votes		28,934	100%
Republican hold			

=== District 22 ===
Incumbent Democrat Benny Shendo has represented the 22nd district since 2013.

New Mexico Senate 22nd District general election, 2020
Party	Candidate	Votes	%
Democratic	Benny Shendo (incumbent)	13,201	66.4%
Republican	Susan Aguayo	6,666	33.6%
Total votes		19,867	100%
Democratic hold			

=== District 23 ===
Incumbent Republican Sander Rue has represented the 23rd district since 2009. Rue lost re-election to Democrat Harold Pope Jr.

New Mexico Senate 23rd District general election, 2020
Party	Candidate	Votes	%
Democratic	Harold Pope Jr.	15,345	52.1%
Republican	Sander Rue (incumbent)	14,130	47.9%
Total votes		29,475	100%
Democratic gain from Republican			

=== District 24 ===
Incumbent Democrat Nancy Rodriguez has represented the 24th district since 1996.

New Mexico Senate 24th District general election, 2020
Party	Candidate	Votes	%
Democratic	Nancy Rodriguez (incumbent)	18,927	80.0%
Republican	Leighton Cornish	3,977	16.8%
Libertarian	Scott Milenski	765	3.2%
Total votes		23,669	100%
Democratic hold			

=== District 25 ===
Incumbent Democratic Majority Leader Peter Wirth has represented the 25th district since 2009.

New Mexico Senate 25th District general election, 2020
Party	Candidate	Votes	%
Democratic	Peter Wirth (incumbent)	30,305	82.4%
Republican	Ricardo Vargas	6,477	17.6%
Total votes		36,782	100%
Democratic hold			

=== District 26 ===
Incumbent Democrat Jacob Candelaria has represented the 26th district since 2013.

New Mexico Senate 26th District general election, 2020
Party	Candidate	Votes	%
Democratic	Jacob Candelaria (incumbent)	12,191	65.8%
Republican	Manuel Lardizabal	6,344	34.2%
Total votes		18,535	100%
Democratic hold			

=== District 27 ===
Incumbent Republican Minority Leader Stuart Ingle has represented the 27th district since 1985.

New Mexico Senate 27th District general election, 2020
Party	Candidate	Votes	%
Republican	Stuart Ingle (incumbent)	13,834	100%
Total votes		13,834	100%
Republican hold			

=== District 28 ===
Incumbent Democrat Gabriel Ramos has represented the 28th district since his appointment on January 15, 2019, after Democrat Howie Morales resigned to become Lieutenant Governor of New Mexico. Ramos lost re-nomination to fellow Democrat Siah Correa Hemphill, who wnet on to win the general election. Democratic primary

New Mexico Senate 28th District Democratic primary election, 2020
Party	Candidate	Votes	%
Democratic	Siah Correa Hemphill	4,809	61.8%
Democratic	Gabriel Ramos (incumbent)	2,970	38.2%
Total votes		7,779	100%

General election

New Mexico Senate 28th District general election, 2020
Party	Candidate	Votes	%
Democratic	Siah Correa Hemphill	11,599	50.8%
Republican	James Williams	11,213	49.2%
Total votes		22,812	100%
Democratic hold			

=== District 29 ===
Incumbent Republican Gregory Baca has represented the 29th district since 2017.

New Mexico Senate 29th District general election, 2020
Party	Candidate	Votes	%
Republican	Gregory Baca (incumbent)	9,598	51.1%
Democratic	Paul Baca	9,193	48.9%
Total votes		18,791	100%
Republican hold			

=== District 30 ===
Incumbent Democrat Clemente Sanchez has represented the 30th district since 2013. Sanchez lost re-nomination to fellow Democrat Pamela Cordova. Cordova lost the general election to Republican Joshua Sanchez. Democratic primary

New Mexico Senate 30th District Democratic primary election, 2020
Party	Candidate	Votes	%
Democratic	Pamela Cordova	3,438	61.3%
Democratic	Clemente Sanchez (incumbent)	2,173	38.7%
Total votes		5,611	100%

Republican primary

New Mexico Senate 30th District Republican primary election, 2020
Party	Candidate	Votes	%
Republican	Joshua Sanchez	2,400	64.8%
Republican	Kelly Zunie	1,306	35.2%
Total votes		3,706	100%

General election

New Mexico Senate 30th District general election, 2020
Party	Candidate	Votes	%
Republican	Joshua Sanchez	10,055	51.1%
Democratic	Pamela Cordova	9,610	48.9%
Total votes		19,665	100%
Republican gain from Democratic			

=== District 31 ===
Incumbent Democrat Joe Cervantes has represented the 31st district since 2012. Democratic primary

New Mexico Senate 31st District Democratic primary election, 2020
Party	Candidate	Votes	%
Democratic	Joe Cervantes (incumbent)	1,372	55.5%
Democratic	Melissa Ontiveros	705	28.5%
Democratic	Arturo Terrazas	394	15.9%
Total votes		2,471	100%

General election

New Mexico Senate 31st District general election, 2020
Party	Candidate	Votes	%
Democratic	Joe Cervantes (incumbent)	9,907	66.0%
Republican	John Roberts	5,108	34.0%
Total votes		15,015	100%
Democratic hold			

=== District 32 ===
Incumbent Republican Cliff Pirtle has represented the 32nd district since 2013.

New Mexico Senate 32nd District general election, 2020
Party	Candidate	Votes	%
Republican	Cliff Pirtle (incumbent)	9,503	100%
Total votes		9,503	100%
Republican hold			

=== District 33 ===
Incumbent Republican William Burt has represented the 33rd district and its predecessors since 2011. Republican primary

New Mexico Senate 33rd District Republican primary election, 2020
Party	Candidate	Votes	%
Republican	William Burt (incumbent)	3,877	56.0%
Republican	Christopher Hensley	3,045	44.0%
Total votes		6,922	100%

General election

New Mexico Senate New Mexico Senate 33rd District general election, 2020
Party	Candidate	Votes	%
Republican	William Burt (incumbent)	14,697	69.0%
Democratic	Denise Lang-Browne	6,601	31.0%
Total votes		21,298	100%
Republican hold			

=== District 34 ===
Incumbent Republican Ron Griggs has represented the 34th district since 2012.

New Mexico Senate 34th District general election, 2020
Party	Candidate	Votes	%
Republican	Ron Griggs (incumbent)	12,351	70.0%
Democratic	Darren Murray Kugler	5,286	30.0%
Total votes		17,637	100%
Republican hold			

=== District 35 ===
Incumbent Democrat John Arthur Smith has represented the 35th district since 1989. Smith lost re-nomination to fellow Democrat Neomi Martinez-Parra. Martinez-Parra lost the general election to Republican Crystal Diamond. Democratic primary

New Mexico Senate 35th District Democratic primary election, 2020
Party	Candidate	Votes	%
Democratic	Neomi Martinez-Parra	2,795	54.9%
Democratic	John Arthur Smith (incumbent)	2,295	45.1%
Total votes		5,090	100%

General election

New Mexico Senate 35th District general election, 2020
Party	Candidate	Votes	%
Republican	Crystal Diamond	11,255	58.1%
Democratic	Neomi Martinez-Parra	8,131	41.9%
Total votes		19,386	100%
Republican gain from Democratic			

=== District 36 ===
Incumbent Democrat Jeff Steinborn has represented the 36th district since 2017. Republican primary

New Mexico Senate 36th District Republican primary election, 2020
Party	Candidate	Votes	%
Republican	Kimberly Skaggs	1,587	61.8%
Republican	Roger Baker II	979	38.2%
Total votes		2,566	100%

General election

New Mexico Senate 36th District general election, 2020
Party	Candidate	Votes	%
Democratic	Jeff Steinborn (incumbent)	11,263	56.3%
Republican	Kimberly Skaggs	8,755	43.7%
Total votes		20,018	100%
Democratic hold			

=== District 37 ===
Incumbent Democrat William Soules has represented the 37th district since 2013.

New Mexico Senate 37th District general election, 2020
Party	Candidate	Votes	%
Democratic	William Soules (incumbent)	14,713	56.8%
Republican	David Gallus	11,195	43.2%
Total votes		25,908	100%
Democratic hold			

=== District 38 ===
Incumbent Democrat Mary Kay Papen has represented the 38th district since 2001. Papen lost re-nomination to fellow Democrat Carrie Hamblen, who went on to win the general election. Democratic primary

New Mexico Senate 38th District Democratic primary election, 2020
Party	Candidate	Votes	%
Democratic	Carrie Hamblen	1,743	49.1%
Democratic	Mary Kay Papen (incumbent)	1,541	43.4%
Democratic	Tracy Perry	265	7.5%
Total votes		3,549	100%

General election

New Mexico Senate 38th District general election, 2020
Party	Candidate	Votes	%
Democratic	Carrie Hamblen	9,640	62.5%
Republican	Charles Wendler	5,788	37.5%
Total votes		15,428	100%
Democratic hold			

=== District 39 ===
Incumbent Democrat Liz Stefanics has represented the 39th district since 2017. Republican primary

New Mexico Senate 39th District Republican primary election, 2020
Party	Candidate	Votes	%
Republican	Joseph Tiano	2,122	51.2%
Republican	Susan Vescovo	2,021	48.8%
Total votes		4,143	100%

General election

New Mexico Senate 39th District general election, 2020
Party	Candidate	Votes	%
Democratic	Liz Stefanics (incumbent)	12,283	55.5%
Republican	Joseph Tiano	9,831	44.5%
Total votes		22,114	100%
Democratic hold			

=== District 40 ===
Incumbent Republican Craig Brandt has represented the 40th district since 2013.

New Mexico Senate 40th District general election, 2020
Party	Candidate	Votes	%
Republican	Craig Brandt (incumbent)	20,204	100%
Total votes		20,204	100%
Republican hold			

=== District 41 ===
Incumbent Republican Gregg Fulfer has represented the 41st district since his appointment on December 26, 2018. Fulfer lost re-nomination to fellow Republican David Gallegos, who went on to win the general election. Republican primary

New Mexico Senate 41st District Republican primary election, 2020
Party	Candidate	Votes	%
Republican	David Gallegos	1,911	53.3%
Republican	Gregg Fulfer (incumbent)	1,678	46.7%
Total votes		3,589	100%

General election

New Mexico Senate 41st District general election, 2020
Party	Candidate	Votes	%
Republican	David Gallegos	11,333	100%
Total votes		11,333	100%
Republican hold			

=== District 42 ===
Incumbent Republican Gay Kernan has represented the th district since 2002.

New Mexico Senate 42nd District general election, 2020
Party	Candidate	Votes	%
Republican	Gay Kernan (incumbent)	17,848	100%
Total votes		17,848	100%
Republican hold			

== See also ==
- 2020 New Mexico elections
- 2020 United States elections
- 2020 United States Senate election in New Mexico
- 2020 United States House of Representatives elections in New Mexico
- 2020 New Mexico House of Representatives election
