= Senator Ulibarri =

Senator Ulibarri may refer to:

- David Ulibarri (fl. 2000s–2010s), New Mexico State Senate
- Jessie Ulibarri (fl. 2010s), Colorado State Senate
