= Senator Paul (disambiguation) =

Rand Paul (born 1963) is a United States Senator from Kentucky.

Senator Paul may also refer to:

- Alexander Paul (1875–1954), Wisconsin State Senate
- Allen Paul (politician) (born 1945), Indiana State Senate
- George Howard Paul (1826–1890), Wisconsin State Senate
- John Paul (judge) (1839–1901), Virginia State Senate
- John Paul (pioneer) (1758–1830), Ohio State Senate and Indiana State Senate
- John Paul Jr. (judge) (1883–1964), Virginia State Senate
- Nick Paul (politician) (fl. 2020s), New Mexico State Senate
- Rusty Paul (born 1952), Georgia State Senate

== See also ==
- James Paull (West Virginia politician) (1901–1983), West Virginia State Senate
