= Rex Wilson =

Rex Wilson may refer to:

- Rex Wilson (runner)
- Rex Wilson (director)
- Rex Wilson (politician)
- Rex Wilson (Home and Away)
