= Senator Baca =

Senator Baca may refer to:

- Gregory A. Baca (born 1971), New Mexico State Senate
- Joe Baca (born 1947), California State Senate
- Polly Baca (born 1941), Colorado State Senate
