= Angel Charley =

American politician

Member of the New Mexico Senate from the 30th district
- Incumbent
- Assumed office January 1, 2025
- Preceded by: Joshua A. Sanchez

Personal details
- Party: Democratic
- Website: www.angelfornm.com

Angel Charley is an American politician who was elected to serve as a member of the New Mexico Senate in the 2024 election.

== Career ==
Angel Charley is of Native American descent. She was a member of an Albuquerque commission. Charley was leader of the Coalition to Stop Violence Against Native Women. In 2024 she was elected to a majority female legislature.

== Personal life ==
Angel Charley is married and has had three children with her husband.
