= Senator McCutcheon =

Senator McCutcheon may refer to:

- John T. McCutcheon (politician) (1892–1971), Washington State Senate
- Steven McCutcheon II (fl. 2020s), New Mexico State Senate
