= Senator Munoz =

Senator Munoz or Muñoz may refer to:

- Antonio Munoz (American politician) (born 1964), Illinois State Senate
- George Muñoz (politician) (fl. 2000s–2010s), New Mexico State Senate
