= Natalie Figueroa =

Natalie Figueroa may refer to:

- Natalie Figueroa (politician), American politician from New Mexico
- Natalie Figueroa (character), from the comedy drama series Orange Is the New Black, played by Alysia Reiner
