= Pat Boone (politician) =

American politician from New Mexico

Member of the New Mexico Senate from the 27th district
- Incumbent
- Assumed office January 1, 2025
- Preceded by: Greg Nibert

Personal details
- Party: Republican
- Website: senatorpatboone.com

Patrick (Pat) Boone IV is an American politician who was elected to serve as a member of the New Mexico Senate in the 2024 election. His district contains the counties of Chaves, Curry, De Baca, Lea and Roosevelt. Boone is a rancher in Roosevelt County, New Mexico.
