= Debbie O'Malley =

American politician from New Mexico

Member of the New Mexico Senate from the 13th district
- Incumbent
- Assumed office January 1, 2025
- Preceded by: Bill O'Neill

Personal details
- Party: Democratic
- Website: www.debbiefornmsenate.com

Micaelita "Debbie" O'Malley is an American politician who was elected to serve as a member of the New Mexico Senate in the 2024 election.

O'Malley was Associate Chief of Staff for Policy for the city of Albuquerque, New Mexico. She is a former Bernalillo County Commissioner and Albuquerque City Councilor.
