= Elaine Sena Cortez =

American politician

Member of the New Mexico House of Representatives from the 62nd district
- Incumbent
- Assumed office January 1, 2025
- Preceded by: Larry R. Scott

Personal details
- Born: Roswell, New Mexico, U.S.
- Party: Republican
- Website: www.elainefornm.com

Elaine Sena Cortez is an American politician serving as a member of the New Mexico House of Representatives for the 62nd district.

== Biography ==
Elaine Sena Cortez was born in Roswell was raised in Hobbs, New Mexico. She is the Executive Director of MyPower, Inc., the largest youth development program in Lea County. She also serves as a professor at the University of the Southwest and Eastern New Mexico University. In 2024, she was elected to the New Mexico House of Representatives, which was a majority female house.
