= Greg Nibert =

American politician (born 1958)

Member of the New Mexico House of Representatives from the 59th district
- In office January 1, 2017 – January 5, 2024
- Preceded by: Nora Espinoza
- Succeeded by: Jared Hembree

Member of the New Mexico Senate from the 27th district
- In office January 5, 2024 – December 31, 2024
- Preceded by: Stuart Ingle
- Succeeded by: Pat Boone

Personal details
- Born: January 3, 1958 (age 68) Roswell, New Mexico
- Party: Republican

Greg Nibert (born January 3, 1958) is an American politician who has served in the New Mexico Legislature. He served in the New Mexico House of Representatives, representing the 59th district from 2017 to 2024, and the New Mexico Senate, representing the 27th district in 2024.

In January 2024, Nibert was appointed to the Senate to replace resigned senator Stuart Ingle.

In 2025, Nilbert was appointed by Gov. Michelle Lujan Grisham to serve on the Public Regulation Commission, an independent state agency that sets utility prices.
