= Nick Paul (politician) =

American politician from New Mexico

Member of the New Mexico Senate from the 33rd district
- In office January 1, 2025 – October 14, 2025
- Preceded by: William Burt
- Succeeded by: Rex Wilson

Personal details
- Born: Albuquerque, New Mexico
- Party: Republican
- Website: www.nickpaulfornm.com

Nicholas (Nick) Allan Paul is an American politician who was elected to serve as a member of the New Mexico Senate in the 2024 election. Paul was a Alamogordo City Commissioner. He resigned from the New Mexico Senate in October 2025 due to health concerns.
