= Cindy Nava =

Mexican-American politician

Member of the New Mexico Senate from the 9th district
- Incumbent
- Assumed office January 1, 2025
- Preceded by: Brenda McKenna

Personal details
- Born: Chihuahua, Mexico
- Party: Democratic
- Education: Santa Fe Community College (AS); University of New Mexico (BA, MS)

Cindy Nava is a Mexican-born American politician who was elected to serve as a member of the New Mexico Senate in the 2024 election. She assumed office on January 1, 2025.

== Early life and education ==
Born in Chihuahua, Mexico, Nava came to the United States with her family as a child. She is a recipient of the Deferred Action for Childhood Arrivals (DACA) program. Raised in Santa Fe and Albuquerque, New Mexico, Nava earned an associate degree in education from Santa Fe Community College, followed by a Bachelor of Arts degree in political science and a Master of Science in educational leadership and policy from the University of New Mexico.

== Career ==
Prior to seeking elected office, Nava worked as an aide in the New Mexico Legislature. She served in the office of then-Congressman Ben Ray Luján and worked on Luján's 2020 Senate campaign. From 2022 to 2024, Nava served as a senior policy advisor in the United States Department of Housing and Urban Development, one of the first DACA recipients to receive a presidential appointment.

In 2024, Nava resigned from HUD and returned to New Mexico to launch a campaign for the New Mexico Senate. Nava won the Democratic primary and defeated Audrey Trujillo in the general election.
