= Stephen Dodson =

American politician

Member-elect of the New Mexico House of Representatives from the 59th district
- Assuming office January 2027
- Succeeding: Mark Murphy

Personal details
- Party: Republican

Stephen Dodson is an American politician. A member of the Republican Party, he is the member-elect for the 59th district of the New Mexico House of Representatives.
