= Mark Murphy (politician) =

American businessman and politician (born 1959)

Member of the New Mexico House of Representatives from the 59th district
- Incumbent
- Assumed office January 16, 2025
- Preceded by: Jared Hembree
- Succeeded by: Stephen Dodson (elect)

Personal details
- Born: Mark Bertram Murphy; December 14, 1959 (age 66)
- Party: Republican
- Education: New Mexico Institute of Mining and Technology (BS)

Mark B. Murphy (born December 14, 1959) is an American businessman, oil producer, and politician currently serving as a member of the New Mexico House of Representatives, representing District 59. Murphy, a Republican, was appointed to the seat by the Chaves County Board of Commissioners on January 16, 2025, to complete the term of Jared Hembree, who resigned due to health issues.

== Political career ==
In April 2026, Murphy abruptly withdrew from seeking renomination, filing his withdrawal on the last day to do so. Some criticized Murphy's delayed withdrawal, stating that it intentionally left the field open for Roswell businessman Stephen Dodson to run unopposed in the primary.
