= David Ulibarri =

American politician

Member of the New Mexico Senate from the 30th district
- In office 2006–2012
- Succeeded by: Clemente Sanchez

Personal details
- Party: Democratic

David Ulibarri is an American politician who served as a member of the New Mexico Senate from 2006 to 2012. A Democrat, he represented the 30th district.
