= Ant Thornton =

American politician

Member of the New Mexico Senate from the 19th district
- Incumbent
- Assumed office January 1, 2025
- Preceded by: Gregg Schmedes

Personal details
- Born: Fairfield, California, U.S.
- Party: Republican
- Education: University of Colorado Boulder; Stanford University; Purdue University
- Website: antthorntonfornm.com

Anthony L. Thornton is an American politician who was elected to serve as a member of the New Mexico Senate in the 2024 election.

Thornton ran for Lieutenant Governor of New Mexico in the 2022 New Mexico gubernatorial election. Thornton is a retired aerospace engineer who spent 27 years at Sandia National Labs, where he became their first Black director.

Party political offices
Preceded by Michelle Garcia Holmes	Republican nominee for Lieutenant Governor of New Mexico; 2022	Succeeded by David Gallegos
