= Jared Hembree =

American politician

Member of the New Mexico House of Representatives from the 59th district
- In office January 14, 2024 – January 11, 2025
- Preceded by: Greg Nibert
- Succeeded by: Mark Murphy

Personal details
- Party: Republican

Jared Hembree is an American politician who served as a Republican member of the New Mexico House of Representatives from the 59th district between 2024 and 2025. He was appointed by the Chaves County Board of Commissioners to fill the seat vacated by Greg Nibert. He resigned in January 2025 due to health concerns. Mark Murphy was subsequently appointed to complete the remainder of his term.

Prior to being appointed to the New Mexico House of Representatives, Hembree worked as the board president of the Independent Petroleum Association of New Mexico.
