= Bill Tallman =

American politician

Member of the New Mexico Senate from the 18th district
- In office January 1, 2017 – December 31, 2024
- Preceded by: Lisa Torraco
- Succeeded by: Natalie Figueroa

Personal details
- Born: 1940 or 1941 (age 85–86)
- Party: Democratic
- Education: Syracuse University (BA); University of Cincinnati (MPA)

Bill G. Tallman (born 1940/1941) is an American politician who served as a member of the New Mexico Senate from 2017 to 2024. He represented the 18th district, having previously served as deputy city manager of Santa Fe, New Mexico.

== Education ==
Tallman earned a Bachelor of Arts from Syracuse University in 1968 and a Master of Public Administration from the University of Cincinnati in 1972.

== Career ==
Tallman has worked as the City Manager of Moline, Illinois, New Castle, Pennsylvania, and Norwich, Connecticut. He also served as Town Manager of Smithfield, Rhode Island. After relocating to New Mexico to become Deputy City Manager of Santa Fe, he remained in the area and ran for a seat in the New Mexico Senate. A Democrat, Tallman represented the 18th district, which includes a portion of Albuquerque, New Mexico.
