= Jerry Ortiz y Pino =

American politician (born 1942)

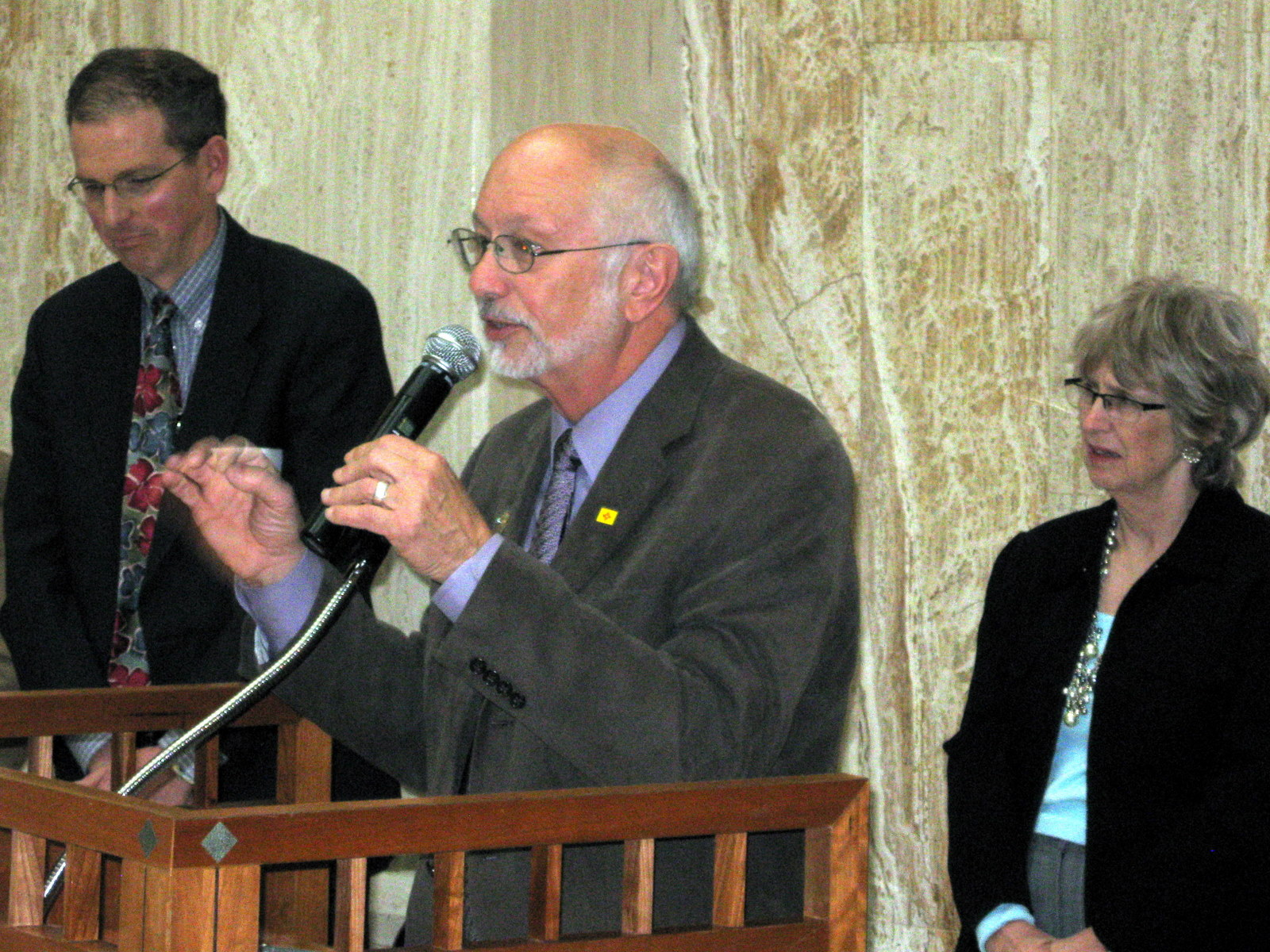
- Ortiz y Pino in 2011

Member of the New Mexico Senate from the 12th district
- In office 2005 – December 31, 2024
- Preceded by: Richard M. Romero
- Succeeded by: Jay C. Block

Personal details
- Born: August 27, 1942 (age 83) Santa Fe, New Mexico, U.S.
- Party: Democratic
- Spouse: Donna Bruzzese
- Education: University of New Mexico (BA); Tulane University (MSW)
- Profession: Social worker

Gerald P. "Jerry" Ortiz y Pino (born August 27, 1942) is an American politician and social worker who served as a member of the New Mexico Senate, where he has represented the 12th district from 2005 to 2024.

== Early life and education ==
Ortiz y Pino was born and raised in Santa Fe, New Mexico. He is one of six siblings. He earned a Bachelor of Arts degree in Latin American studies from the University of New Mexico, followed by a Master of Social Work from Tulane University.

== Political career ==
Ortiz y Pino succeeded Richard M. Romero, a fellow Democrat who ran unsuccessfully for Congress and Mayor of Albuquerque in 2009. Ortiz y Pino ran unopposed in 2008, 2012, 2016. He also wrote a recurring column which appeared in the Weekly Alibi, an alternative publication in the Albuquerque.

Ortiz y Pino has advocated for the legalization of cannabis in New Mexico. Ortiz y Pino is a supporter of Bernie Sanders, and endorsed the senator during the 2016 and 2020 Democratic Party primaries.

In 2024, Ortiz y Pino voted against establishing an Office of Housing within the executive to coordinate housing policies across state entities and develop comprehensive plans to increase housing supply.
