= Clemente Sanchez (politician) =

American politician

Member of the New Mexico Senate from the 30th district
- In office January 15, 2013 – 2021
- Preceded by: David Ulibarri
- Succeeded by: Joshua A. Sanchez

Personal details
- Born: June 24, 1958 (age 68) Cubero, New Mexico, U.S.
- Party: Democratic
- Education: Eastern New Mexico University (BBA); New Mexico Highlands University (MBA)

Clemente Sanchez (born June 24, 1958) is an American politician and businessman who served as a member of the New Mexico Senate for the 30th district from January 15, 2013, to 2021. Clemente is the CEO and president of the Bank of New Mexico, a subsidiary of Triumph Bancorp.

== Early life and education ==
Sanchez was born in Cubero, New Mexico. He earned his BBA in accounting from Eastern New Mexico University and his MBA from New Mexico Highlands University.

== Career ==
In 1991, Sanchez became director of the New Mexico State University Grants Small Business Development Center.

In May 2007, Sanchez began working at the Bank of New Mexico as chief executive. In September 2015, it was announced that Sanchez would become CEO of the bank. As part of taking the position, he announced that he would be retiring as director of the New Mexico State University-Grants Small Business Development Center.

== Elections ==
In 2008, incumbent Senator Joseph Fidel retired and left the seat open. Sanchez ran in the three-way June 8, 2008 Democratic Primary but lost by 5 votes to David Ulibarri, who went on to win the seat in the November 4, 2008 General election.

In 2012, Sanchez challenged District 30 incumbent Democratic Senator David Ulibarri in the four-way June 5, 2012 Democratic Primary, winning by 11 votes with 1,237 votes (31.1%) and won the November 6, 2012 General election with 8,844 votes (53%) against Republican nominee Vickie Perea, who was appointed to the New Mexico House of Representatives in 2013 to replace Stephen Easley.

In 2017, Sanchez won the district again in an uncontested race. In 2020, Sanchez was defeated in the Democratic primary by retired teacher Pamela Cordova, who was seen as a progressive alternative to Sanchez. In the 2020 general election, Cordova was defeated by Republican nominee Joshua A. Sanchez.
