= Daniel Ivey-Soto =

American politician

Member of the New Mexico Senate from the 15th district
- In office January 1, 2013 – December 31, 2024
- Preceded by: Tim Eichenberg
- Succeeded by: Heather Berghmans

Personal details
- Party: Democratic
- Profession: Entrepreneur, Association Executive

Daniel A. Ivey-Soto is an American politician who served as a Democratic member of the New Mexico Senate, representing District 15 from 2013 to 2024. Daniel A. Ivey-Soto, JD, MBA, MA-Ed was known for his attention to detail in lawmaking and for his knowledge of parliamentary procedure. Before taking office in the New Mexico Senate in 2012, he was Associate Deputy Secretary of State of New Mexico for Election, Ethics, and Legal. He was the New Mexico State Elections Director 2007-2008. He served as a member parliamentarian for the New Mexico State Senate.

Ivey-Soto's reputation for picking apart legislation led colleagues to turn his name into a verb. (' “They Ivey-Sotoed my bill”, legislators will say, never with happiness.') In addition to his part-time work as a non-salary senator, he was the Executive Director of a group representing the state's 33 county clerks.

== Early life ==
Daniel A. Ivey-Soto was born in Arcadia, CA in 1966 to parents Clara Ivey Soto and Olin Marion Ivey, Jr. Olin Ivey, Jr., a missionary with the Methodist church, met Clara Soto in Cuba. They married there and left Cuba, where Clara’s father was a political prisoner, in 1960 for the United States, settling for a few years in Brooklyn, NY, where Olin Ivey, Jr. was the Pastor at Emmanuel Methodist Church in Brooklyn. Due to postings by the Methodist Church, the family lived in California, Illinois, and Georgia as well as Mexico and Costa Rica. The family returned to Claremont, CA in 1977. Clara Ivey Soto was an educator who retired from Pomona College in 2007 and died in 2022.

== Education and background ==
JD, University of New Mexico School of Law, 1996

MBA, University of New Mexico, Robert O. Anderson School of Management, 1998

MA-Education, Claremont Graduate University, 1991

BA, Political Science, California State Polytechnic University, 1988

AA, Spanish, Citrus College, 1986

Ivey-Soto was President of the National Hispanic Caucus of State Legislators for the 2019-2021 term.

He holds credentials (PRP and CP-T, respectively) as a parliamentarian from two organizations: the National Association of Parliamentarians (NAP) and the American Institute of Parliamentarians (AIP). He is past vice president of AIP, past president of the AIP Educational Foundation; past president of the American College of Parliamentary Lawyers; past Board member, past District 6 Director, and past legal advisor of NAP; past president of the New Mexico State Association of Parliamentarians; and trustee of the National Association of Parliamentarians Educational Foundation.

== Legislative accomplishments ==
First term highlights:

- SB140 (2014) allowed the developer of Winrock Town Center to restructure existing tax increment districts.
- SB158 (2014) allowed New Mexico high school students to take college classes and get high school and college credits simultaneously.
- SB136 (2014) updated child abuse laws to ensure prosecution of those who do not report child abuse.
- SJR16 (2014) was a constitutional amendment -- approved by a majority of the people in the 2014 general election as Constitutional Amendment 4 – that allowed judges seeking retention to be treated the same as other general election candidates.
- SB299 (2013) modernized many aspects of marriage laws, many of which had not been updated since the 1800s.

Second term highlights:

- SB45 (2017) allowed for termination of parental rights when a child is conceived from forced sexual conduct.
- HB113 (2017) As part of the Department of Information Technology’s three year plan, this bill incorporated a statewide broadband network using educational institutions as aggregation points, leveraging Federal E-Rate dollars to extend internet access to all parts of the state.
- SB19 (2019) provided transparency and oversight to the court administered guardianship process in response to a series of investigative reports by the Albuquerque Journal which highlighted abuses of the elderly and other vulnerable persons.
- HB433 (2019) required Home Inspectors, who enter private residences and make recommendations on the largest asset most people own, to be licensed and undergo a criminal background check.
- SB227 (2019) protects people from discrimination in the workplace based on sexual orientation and gender identity by removing the minimum threshold of employees that were previously required in a business before such discrimination would be unlawful under the New Mexico Human Rights Act.
- SB137 (2020) established a statutory policy that state occupational and professional licensure will be awarded to qualified applicants regardless of federal immigration status as permitted by the federal code.
- HB292 (2020) mandated that the co-pay for any formulary or medically necessary prescription for insulin shall not exceed $25.00.

== Political career ==
- 1996: When House District 18 Representative Cisco McSorley ran for the New Mexico Senate, Ivey-Soto ran in the four-way June 4, 1996 Democratic Primary but lost to Gail Beam; Beam went on to win the three-way November 5, 1996 General election.
- 2012: Incumbent District 15 Democratic Senator Tim Eichenberg was unopposed for the June 5, 2012 Democratic Primary; when Senator Eichenberg withdrew, Ivey-Soto replaced him on the November 6, 2012 General election ballot, winning with 10,927 votes (52.9%) against Republican nominee H. Diane Snyder.
- 2016: Ivey-Soto was challenged by Republican Eric Burton, a lawyer and business owner, for Senate District 15. Ivey-Soto won with 11,321 votes (55.76%)
- 2020: Ivey-Soto was challenged by Republican Sandra B. Rausch for Senate District 15. Ivey-Soto won with 13,831 votes (60.06%)

In 2022, Ivey-Soto sought to remove automatic voter registration from a voting rights bill that Democratic New Mexico legislators were working on. Ivey-Soto argued that it was intrusive to automatically register voters. Ivey-Soto was also opposed to an Election Day holiday. Ivey-Soto was defeated in the primary race in June 2024. Earlier in 2024 the state Democratic Party severed ties with him over sexual harassment and assault allegations.
