= Gregory A. Baca =

American politician and attorney

Greg Baca

Minority Leader of the New Mexico Senate
- In office January 19, 2021 – December 31, 2024
- Preceded by: Stuart Ingle
- Succeeded by: William Sharer

Member of the New Mexico Senate from the 29th district
- In office January 1, 2017 – December 31, 2024
- Preceded by: Michael S. Sanchez
- Succeeded by: Joshua A. Sanchez

Personal details
- Born: May 14, 1971 (age 55) Belen, New Mexico, U.S.
- Party: Republican
- Education: University of Phoenix (BS); University of New Mexico (JD)
- Website: Campaign website

Military service
- Allegiance: United States
- Branch/service: United States Navy
- Battles/wars: Operation Desert Storm

Gregory A. Baca (born May 14, 1971) is an American attorney and politician who served as a member of the New Mexico Senate from 2017 to 2024.

== Early life and education ==
Born and raised in Belen, New Mexico, Baca graduated from Belen High School in 1989. He enlisted in the United States Navy and served in the Gulf War. He earned his BS in business administration from the University of Phoenix and his JD from the University of New Mexico School of Law.

== Career ==
While serving in the United States Navy, Baca was a nuclear operator on the USS Nimitz.

Baca operates his own legal practice in Los Lunas, New Mexico, where he specializes in real estate, bankruptcy, business, and probate law.

Baca was elected to the New Mexico Senate in 2016, defeating Democratic Majority Leader Michael S. Sanchez.

Baca was re-elected in 2020, defeating Paul Baca. He did not seek a third term in 2024.

New Mexico Senate
Preceded by Stuart Ingle	Minority Leader of the New Mexico Senate; 2021–2024	Succeeded by William Sharer
