= Siah Correa Hemphill =

American politician

Member of the New Mexico Senate from the 28th district
- In office December 31, 2020 – December 31, 2024
- Preceded by: Gabriel Ramos
- Succeeded by: Gabriel Ramos

Personal details
- Born: Siah Correa
- Party: Democratic
- Spouse: Jay Hemphill
- Children: 4
- Education: Western New Mexico University (BA, MA)

Siah Correa Hemphill is an American politician, educator, and school psychologist who served as a member of the New Mexico Senate from the 28th district. Elected in 2020, she assumed office after the resignation of her predecessor in December 2020.

== Early life and education ==
Hemphill was born and raised in Grant County, New Mexico. She earned a Bachelor of Arts degree in elementary education and Master of Arts in school psychology from Western New Mexico University.

== Career ==
Prior to entering politics, Hemphill worked as an educator for 25 years. In October 2019, Hemphill announced her intention to challenge moderate incumbent Democrat Gabriel Ramos in the 2020 election. Hemphill defeated Ramos in the primary, and defeated Republican nominee James Williams in the November general election.

== Personal life ==
Hemphill and her husband, Jay Hemphill, have four children. One of Hemphill's sons was born with a genetic disorder and several disabilities.
