= Steven McCutcheon II =

American politician

Member of the New Mexico Senate from the 42nd district
- In office September 15, 2023 – December 31, 2024
- Preceded by: Gay Kernan
- Succeeded by: Larry R. Scott

Personal details
- Born: Carlsbad, New Mexico, U.S.
- Party: Republican
- Website: stevenforsd42.com

Steven McCutcheon II is an American politician who served as a Republican member of the New Mexico Senate, representing District 42 from September 15, 2023 to December 31, 2024.

== Elections ==
Senator McCutcheon was appointed by Governor Michelle Lujan Grisham to the district in southeastern New Mexico vacated in 2023 when Senator Gay Kernan retired. McCutcheon ran for re-election in 2024 but was defeated in the Republican primary by Larry R. Scott, who went on to win the general election for the seat. McCutcheon's term concluded on December 31, 2024.
