= Rex Wilson (politician) =

Member of the New Mexico Senate

Member of the New Mexico Senate from the 33rd District
- Incumbent
- Assumed office January 8, 2026
- Preceded by: Nicholas Paul

Lincoln County Commissioner
- In office 1997–2003

Personal details
- Party: Republican

Rex Wilson is an American politician and member of the New Mexico Senate.

== Biography ==
Prior to becoming a state senator, Wilson worked as a healthcare administrator for 18 years, and previously served as the County Commissioner for Lincoln County from 1997 to 2003.

On January 8, 2026, he was appointed to the New Mexico Senate by Governor Michelle Grisham.
