= Shannon Pinto =

American politician

Shannon D. Pinto

Member of the New Mexico Senate from the 3rd district
- Incumbent
- Assumed office July 25, 2019
- Nominated by: Michelle Lujan Grisham
- Preceded by: John Pinto

Personal details
- Born: Tohatchi, New Mexico, U.S.
- Party: Democratic
- Relations: John Pinto (grandfather)
- Education: Southwestern Indian Polytechnic Institute (AS); University of New Mexico (BBA)

Shannon D. Pinto is an American politician serving as a member of the New Mexico Senate. A member of the Democratic Party, Pinto represents the 3rd district, which includes Shiprock, New Mexico and part of Navajo Nation.

== Early life and education ==
A member of Navajo Nation, Pinto was born and raised in Tohatchi, New Mexico. She earned an Associate's degree in Business from the Southwestern Indian Polytechnic Institute and a Bachelor of Business Administration from the University of New Mexico.

== Career ==
After the death of her grandfather, John Pinto, Shannon was appointed by Governor Michelle Lujan Grisham to fill his vacant seat in the New Mexico Senate. The elder Pinto had served in the Senate from 1977 until 2019, when he died at the age of 94. The district, Senate District 3, is largely rural and predominantly Native American; it stretches from Gallup to Shiprock.

She took office on July 25, 2019.

== See also ==
- List of Native American politicians
- Native American women in politics
