= Southwestern Indian Polytechnic Institute =

Tribal community college in New Mexico, US

Coordinates: 35.1747°N 106.6658°W

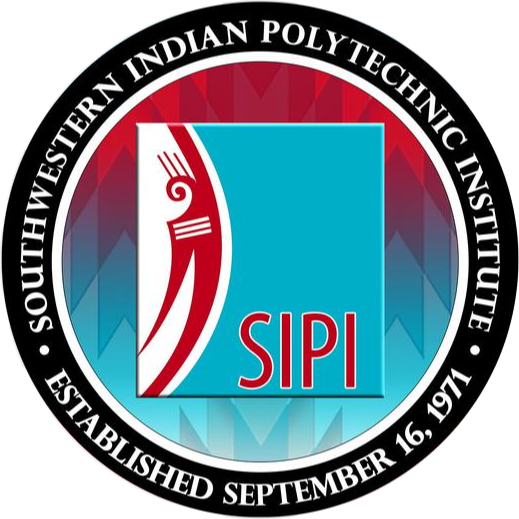
- Type: Public tribal land-grant community college
- Established: 1971
- Parent institution: Bureau of Indian Affairs
- Academic affiliations: Space-grant
- President: Tamarah Pfeiffer
- Undergraduates: 233 (all undergraduate) (2024)
- Location: Albuquerque postal address, New Mexico, United States
- Campus: urban/suburban reserve
- Website: sipi.edu
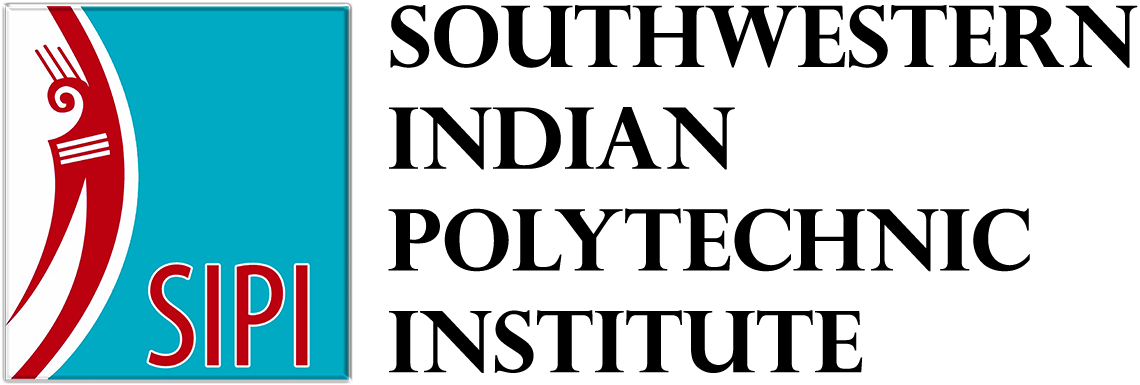

Southwestern Indian Polytechnic Institute (SIPI) is a public tribal land-grant community college in unincorporated Bernalillo County, New Mexico, with an Albuquerque postal address. It is federally operated by the Bureau of Indian Affairs and funded through the Bureau of Indian Education, both agencies within the United States Department of the Interior. More than 120 different Indian Tribes are represented in SIPI's student body.

== History ==
The Southwestern Indian Polytechnic Institute was conceived by the All Indian Pueblo Council, who envisioned a post-secondary school that could serve the Native American community. Collective efforts with tribal leaders, public officials, and interested citizens resulted in the school's founding in 1971; dedication ceremonies were held on August 21, 1971. September 16, 1971, was the first day of classes. It operated initially on an "open-entry, open-exit system" of individualized training. It was funded by the Bureau of Indian Education, within the Bureau of Indian Affairs.

In 1974, SIPI was awarded a citation for Excellence of Service. By 1975, SIPI was accredited at the Certificate Level by the North Central Association of Colleges and Schools.

In 1994, the college was designated as a land-grant college, together with 31 other tribal colleges.

It lost its accreditation in July 2010 and had been designated a "candidate" by the Higher Learning Commission. On March 12, 2014 SIPI was awarded "Initial Accreditation" by the Higher Learning Commission.

A statement on the college's webpage says the following: "Current accreditation status: SIPI is currently accredited by the Higher Learning Commission (HLC). In 2018, the HLC Commission informed SIPI that it was re-accredited upholding its degree and certification programs as a result of the prior year comprehensive evaluation. SIPI successfully demonstrated that it met established standards. In September 2023, SIPI will have a comprehensive review conducted by an on-site review team as part of the regular reaffirmation cycle."

== Campus ==
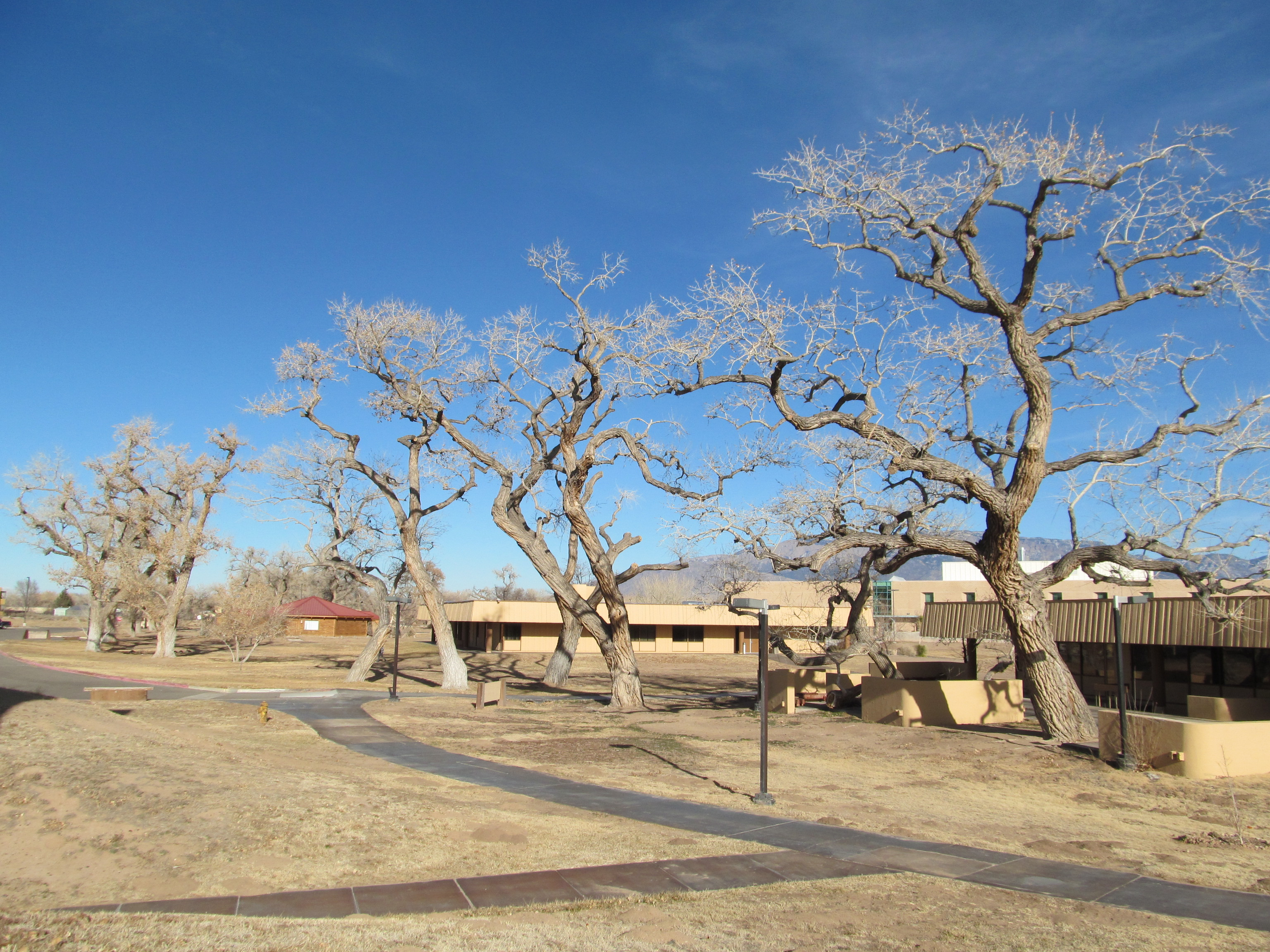
Southwestern Indian Polytechnic Institute in 2012

SIPI is in unincorporated Bernalillo County, New Mexico, with an Albuquerque postal address. It is adjacent to northwest Albuquerque.

SIPI is located on approximately 164 acres (66 ha) of land. SIPI is located in the center of New Mexico’s agricultural and high-tech corridors (Los Alamos and Sandia National Laboratories, and Intel Corporation), major universities and the largest technical force within a 500-mile radius. SIPI's state-of the-art Science and Technology Center includes 12 research and teaching laboratories, 10 classrooms, two distance learning rooms, a 500-seat auditorium, faculty offices and conference rooms.

== Partnerships ==
SIPI has agreements with the University of New Mexico, New Mexico State University, and New Mexico Highlands University to ensure better recruitment, transfer, and retention rates for Native Americans so that students may easily transfer to four-year and graduate programs. The college has also established agreements with regional public institutions outside of New Mexico.

SIPI is a member of the American Indian Higher Education Consortium (AIHEC), which is a community of tribally and federally chartered institutions working to strengthen tribal nations. SIPI was created to serve higher education needs of American Indians. SIPI generally serves geographically isolated populations who do not have ready access to higher education.

The institute lost its accreditation from the Higher Learning Commission in July 2010. On March 12, 2014, SIPI was awarded "Initial Accreditation" by the Higher Learning Commission and is once again accredited by the agency.

== See also ==
- Haskell Indian Nations University
