= Nicole Tobiassen =

American politician

Member of the New Mexico Senate from the 21st district
- Incumbent
- Assumed office January 1, 2025
- Preceded by: Mark Moores

Personal details
- Born: Clearwater, Florida, U.S.
- Party: Republican
- Children: 2
- Education: St. Petersburg College (AA); University of South Florida (BA)

Nicole L. Tobiassen is an American politician who was elected to the New Mexico Senate for the 21st district. She assumed office on January 1, 2025.

== Early life and education ==
Tobiassen was born in Michigan City, Indiana, and raised in Clearwater, Florida. She earned an honors associate degree from St. Petersburg College and a Bachelor of Arts degree in history from the University of South Florida.

== Career ==
Outside of politics, Tobiassen works as a business coach and owns a business coaching firm. She was previously a corporate sales manager at Enterprise Rent-A-Car.
