= Craig Brandt =

American politician

Member of the New Mexico Senate from the 40th district
- Incumbent
- Assumed office January 15, 2013
- Preceded by: William Burt

Personal details
- Born: August 28, 1968 (age 57) Quincy, California, U.S.
- Party: Republican
- Education: Oklahoma Baptist University (BA)
- Website: craigbrandt.com

Craig W. Brandt (born August 28, 1968) is an American politician and a Republican member of the New Mexico Senate representing District 40 since January 15, 2013.

== Education ==
Brandt earned his BA from Oklahoma Baptist University.

== Elections ==
Before his election to the New Mexico state Senate, Brandt served on the Rio Rancho School Board.

- 2012: With District 40 incumbent Republican Senator William Burt redistricted to District 33, Brandt ran in the June 5, 2012, Republican Primary, winning with 1,363 votes (62.2%) and won the November 6, 2012, General election with 9,982 votes (55.3%) against Democratic nominee Linda Allison.
