= Heather Berghmans =

American politician

Member of the New Mexico Senate from the 15th district
- Incumbent
- Assumed office January 1, 2025
- Preceded by: Daniel Ivey-Soto

Personal details
- Party: Democratic

Heather Berghmans is an American politician who was elected as a member of the New Mexico Senate for the 15th district in 2024. A member of the Democratic Party, she defeated incumbent Daniel Ivey-Soto in the primary.
