= Bill O'Neill (New Mexico politician) =

American politician (1956–2025)

- O'Neill in 2014

Member of the New Mexico Senate from the 13th district
- In office January 15, 2013 – December 31, 2024
- Preceded by: Dede Feldman
- Succeeded by: Debbie O'Malley

Member of the New Mexico House of Representatives from the 15th district
- In office January 2009 – December 2012
- Preceded by: Teresa Zanetti
- Succeeded by: Emily Kane

Personal details
- Born: February 20, 1956
- Died: March 31, 2025 (aged 69)
- Party: Democratic
- Education: Cornell University
- Website: billoneillfornm.com

William Baldwin O'Neill (February 20, 1956 – March 31, 2025) was an American politician and a Democratic member of the New Mexico Senate representing District 13 from 2013 to 2024. O'Neill served consecutively in the New Mexico Legislature from January 2009 until December 2012 in the New Mexico House of Representatives District 15 seat. He ran for re-election in 2024, but was defeated in the Democratic primary.

== Background ==
O'Neill was born on February 20, 1956. He attended Cornell University, where he was a member of the Quill and Dagger society.

O'Neill died of prostate cancer on March 31, 2025, at the age of 69.

== Elections ==
- 2012 When Senate District 13 Democratic Senator Dede Feldman retired and left the seat open, O'Neill ran in the three-way June 5, 2012, Democratic Primary, winning with 2,620 votes (52.9%) and was unopposed for the November 6, 2012, General election, winning with 15,516 votes.
- 2002 When House District 15 incumbent Democratic Representative John Sanchez ran for Governor of New Mexico and left the seat open, O'Neill ran in the three-way 2002 Democratic Primary but lost to Steven Archibeque, who lost the November 5, 2002, General election to Republican nominee Teresa Zanetti.
- 2004 To challenge Representative Zanetti, O'Neill was unopposed for the June 1, 2004, Democratic Primary, winning with 1,472 votes but lost the November 2, 2004, General election to Representative Zanetti.
- 2008 O'Neill and Representative Zanetti were both unopposed for their June 8, 2008, primaries, setting up a rematch; O'Neill won the November 4, 2008, General election with 7,532 votes (52.1%) against Representative Zanetti.
- 2010 O'Neill was unopposed for the June 1, 2010, Democratic Primary, winning with 1,522 votes and the November 2, 2010, General election, winning with 5,545 votes (50.8%) against Republican nominee Justin Horwitz.
