= Larry R. Scott =

American businessman, engineer, and politician

Member of the New Mexico House of Representatives from the 62nd district
- In office January 1, 2015 – December 31, 2024
- Preceded by: Donald Bratton
- Succeeded by: Elaine Sena Cortez

Member of the New Mexico Senate from the 42nd district
- Incumbent
- Assumed office January 1, 2025
- Preceded by: Steven McCutcheon II

Personal details
- Born: March 24, 1952 (age 74)
- Party: Republican
- Education: University of Texas at Austin (BS)

Larry Ray Scott (born March 24, 1952) is an American businessman, engineer, and politician who has served as a Republican member of the New Mexico Legislature since 2015. He served as a member of the New Mexico House of Representatives, representing the 62nd district from 2015 to 2024, and as a member of the New Mexico Senate, where he has represented the 42nd district since 2025. Previously, he served in the New Mexico House of Representatives.

== Early life and education ==
Scott was born on March 24, 1952, in Hobbs, New Mexico. He attended the University of Texas at Austin, earning a Bachelor of Science degree in electrical engineering.

== Career ==
Prior to entering politics, Scott worked as an engineer and was the president of Lynx Petroleum Consultants, an oil and gas company based in Hobbs, New Mexico. Scott is the member of the Republican Party.

SInce his election in 2014, Scott has not faced an opponent for re-election. In 2020, Scott opposed an economic recovery bill, criticizing the state's decision to shut down the economy during the COVID-19 pandemic.

== Elections ==
In 2024, Scott transitioned from the New Mexico House of Representatives, where he had served since 2015, to pursue a seat in the New Mexico Senate representing District 42. In the Republican primary on June 4, 2024, Scott defeated incumbent Senator Steve McCutcheon II, securing 61.02% of the vote (3,226 votes) to McCutcheon's 38.98% (2,061 votes). With no Democratic nominee in the race, Scott ran unopposed in the general election on November 5, 2024, and won the seat with 100% of the vote (15,559 votes).
