= Linda Trujillo =

American politician

Member of the New Mexico House of Representatives from the 48th district
- In office January 1, 2017 – July 9, 2020
- Preceded by: Lucky Varela
- Succeeded by: Tara Lujan

Member of the New Mexico Senate from the 24th district
- Incumbent
- Assumed office January 1, 2025
- Preceded by: Nancy Rodriguez

Personal details
- Born: May 20, 1959 (age 67) Tacoma, Washington, U.S.
- Party: Democratic
- Education: Evergreen State College (BA); Seattle University (JD)

Linda M. Trujillo (born May 20, 1959) is an American politician who has represented the 24th district in the New Mexico Senate since 2025. She previously served in the New Mexico House of Representatives, representing the 48th district from 2017 to 2020. On July 9, 2020, she resigned from the New Mexico House of Representatives due to financial issues.
