= Jay C. Block =

American politician (born 1970)

Member of the New Mexico Senate from the 12th district
- Incumbent
- Assumed office January 1, 2025
- Preceded by: Jerry Ortiz y Pino

Member of the Sandoval County Commission from the 2nd district
- In office 2016–2024
- Preceded by: Nora M. Scherzinger
- Succeeded by: John Herr

Personal details
- Born: November 9, 1970 (age 55) Manchester, New Hampshire, U.S.
- Party: Republican
- Spouse: Jennifer
- Education: North Dakota State University

Jay Christopher Block (born November 9, 1970) is an American politician. A member of the Republican Party, he has been in the New Mexico Senate since 2025. Block was previously a member of the Sandoval County Commission from 2016 to 2024. He lost the Republican primary for New Mexico governor in 2022.

== Early life ==
Block was born in Manchester, New Hampshire. As a child, he struggled in school due to dyslexia. In his teens, he volunteered for Jack Kemp's unsuccessful bid for the Republican nomination in the 1988 US presidential election. After high school, he joined the US Air Force and was in the ROTC program while at North Dakota State University.

Block was diagnosed with post-traumatic stress disorder following his service in Afghanistan. He spent time working at the Pentagon and Kirtland Air Force Base. Following his retirement from the Air Force in 2016, he became a consultant for the Department of Defense on nuclear operations.

== Political career ==
Block, a Republican, was first elected to the Sandoval County Commission in 2016 and was re-elected in 2020. While on the commission, he allocated budgetary support for drug and alcohol treatment services. In 2022, he voted against certifying the result of the municipal, primary, and general elections. He was outvoted by the other county commissioners.

On April 17, 2021, Block became the first candidate to enter the Republican primary for the New Mexico governorship in 2022. In the primary, he placed fourth with 10.6% of the vote, losing the nomination to Mark Ronchetti with 58.4%. Ronchetti lost the general election.

Block was elected to the New Mexico Senate in 2024 representing the 12th district. He assumed office on January 1, 2025, succeeding longtime Democratic senator Jerry Ortiz y Pino after redistricting changed the seat's boundaries.

As of 2025, Block is on the Senate Health & Public Affairs committee and the Senate Rules committee.

== Political positions ==
Block supports Donald Trump. He supports the Second Amendment, right-to-work laws and favors life imprisonment or the death penalty for drug dealers, citing the fentanyl crisis. He also supports the oil and gas industry. He has described himself as an opponent of the "woke left". He opposes abortion and transgender rights.

== Personal life ==
Block met his first wife, Kelli, while attending North Dakota State University.

As of 2024, Block had four children and was married to Jennifer. His daughter Maddie Block, who supports Palestinian rights, has openly been critical of his defense of Israel's actions during the Gaza War along with his stances regarding abortion. She told The New York Times that "she would have been more willing to overlook their disagreements if her father were not in office." In response, Block stated he "supported her right to say whatever she wanted about his political positions".
