= Brenda McKenna =

American politician

Member of the New Mexico Senate from the 9th district
- In office January 1, 2021 – December 31, 2024
- Preceded by: John Sapien
- Succeeded by: Cindy Nava

Personal details
- Born: Brenda Grace Agoyothé Nambé Pueblo, New Mexico, U.S.
- Party: Democratic
- Spouse: Ralph McKenna
- Education: Syracuse University (BA); Central Washington University (BS)

Brenda Grace Agoyothé McKenna is an American politician, educator, and political advisor who served as a member of the New Mexico Senate from the 9th district. Elected in 2020, she served from 2021 to 2025.

== Early life and education ==
A native of Nambé Pueblo, New Mexico, McKenna graduated from Pojoaque Valley High School in Santa Fe. Her father served in the Vietnam War and her mother worked as a dental assistant. McKenna earned a Bachelor of Arts degree in psychology from Syracuse University and a Master of Science in organizational development from Central Washington University.

== Career ==
After earning her master's degree, McKenna worked as a language program coordinator for the University of New Mexico Department of Linguistics. She also served as the public relations director of the Central New Mexico chapter of the League of Women Voters. She was the chair of the Nambe Pueblo Gaming Enterprise Board and worked as an examiner for Quality New Mexico, a non-profit based in Albuquerque. Prior to her election, McKenna worked as field representative in the district office of Congresswoman Deb Haaland.

In the 2020 Democratic primary for the 9th district in the New Mexico Senate, McKenna placed first in a field of three candidates. She then defeated Republican nominee John Clark in the November general election. She served from January 1, 2021 to December 31, 2024.

== Personal life ==
McKenna lives in Corrales, New Mexico.

== See also ==
- List of Native American politicians
- Native American women in politics
