= William Soules =

American politician

Member of the New Mexico Senate from the 37th district
- Incumbent
- Assumed office January 15, 2013
- Preceded by: Stephen Fischmann

Personal details
- Born: December 6, 1955 (age 70) Las Cruces, New Mexico, U.S.
- Party: Democratic
- Education: New Mexico State University

William P. Soules (born December 6, 1955) is an American politician and a Democratic member of the New Mexico Senate representing District 37 since January 15, 2013. He is vice-chair of the Senate Education Committee.

== Education ==
Soules earned his BA and MA in psychology and his PhD from New Mexico State University where be became a member of Phi Kappa Tau fraternity.

== Elections ==
- 2012 – When District 37 Democratic Senator Stephen Fischmann left the legislature and left the seat open, Soules was unopposed for the June 5, 2012, Democratic primary, winning with 1,382 votes and won the November 6, 2012, general election with 9,330 votes (52.2%) against Republican nominee Cathey Jo Alberson.
- 2016 – On March 26, Soules announced he would run for a second term. In his announcement, Soules said he would continue to focus on education and healthcare.
