= Crystal Brantley =

American politician (born 1979)

Member of the New Mexico Senate from the 35th district
- Incumbent
- Assumed office January 19, 2021
- Preceded by: John Arthur Smith

Personal details
- Born: October 10, 1979 (age 46) Nacogdoches, Texas, U.S.
- Party: Republican
- Education: New Mexico State University (BS)

Crystal R. Brantley (née Diamond; born October 10, 1979) is an American politician serving as a member of the New Mexico Senate from the 35th district. Elected in 2020, she assumed office on January 19, 2021.

== Education ==
Brantley earned a Bachelor of Science degree in agricultural economics and business from New Mexico State University.

== Career ==
Prior to entering politics, she served as the director of the Sierra Soil & Water Conservation District and worked as a self-employed agricultural consultant.

In the June 2020 Democratic primary, incumbent Democrat John Arthur Smith was defeated by Neomi Martinez-Parra. Brantley defeated Martinez-Parra in the November general election and assumed office on January 19, 2021. Brantley won 11,256 votes to Martinez-Parra's 8,135, for a margin of 58% to 42%. Prior to her general election win, the 35th district had not been represented by a Republican in 65 years.

== Personal life ==
Brantley lives in Elephant Butte, New Mexico.
