= Joe Cervantes =

American politician (born 1961)

Joseph Cervantes

Member of the New Mexico Senate from the 31st district
- Incumbent
- Assumed office 2013
- Preceded by: Cynthia Nava

Member of the New Mexico House of Representatives from the 52nd district
- In office 2001–2012
- Succeeded by: Doreen Gallegos

Member of the Doña Ana County Commission
- In office 1998–2001

Personal details
- Born: January 19, 1961 (age 65) Las Cruces, New Mexico, U.S.
- Party: Democratic
- Spouse: Jennifer Cervantes
- Children: 3
- Education: University of New Mexico (BA, JD); California Polytechnic State University (MArch)

Joseph Cervantes (born January 19, 1961) is an American attorney and politician who has served as a member of the New Mexico Senate for the 31st district since 2012. The district covers parts of Doña Ana and Otero counties. He is a member of the Democratic Party.

Cervantes currently serves as the Chairman of the Senate Judiciary Committee. He is often described as a moderate to conservative Democrat.

== Early life and education ==
Joseph Cervantes was born in Las Cruces, New Mexico, and raised in a farming family near La Mesa. He graduated from Las Cruces High School in 1979, earned a B.A. in Architecture from the University of New Mexico in 1983, and a Master of Architecture from California Polytechnic State University in 1985.

Cervantes received his Juris Doctor from the University of New Mexico School of Law in 1991.

== Political career ==
In 2022 the law firm of Cervantes Scherr Legate donated $3 million to the University of New Mexico Law School to permanently endow full annual student scholarships.

=== New Mexico Legislature ===
==== House of Representatives ====
Cervantes was first elected to public office in 1998 defeating Republican incumbent Doña Ana County Commissioner Dora Harp. In 2001, Cervantes was appointed to the New Mexico House of Representatives, and was reelected in five successive campaigns through 2012. In the New Mexico House of Representatives, Cervantes was appointed as Chairman of the House Judiciary Committee, Vice-Chairman of the House Rules Committee, and Chairman of the interim Water & Natural Resources Committee. He stepped down from the House Judiciary Committee in 2007 amidst conflict with then-Speaker Ben Luján.

==== Senate ====
In 2012, Cervantes announced he would seek the New Mexico Senate seat vacated by the retirement of Sen. Cynthia Nava. In the June 2012 Democratic primary election Cervantes defeated former Sunland Park Mayor Jesus Ruben Segura. Cervantes went on to win with 68.26% of the general election vote. Cervantes has been re-elected to the Senate in 2016 and 2020.

In 2020, Cervantes was elected Chairman of the Senate Judiciary Committee after the previous chair, Richard Martinez, stepped down amidst a conviction for aggravated drunken driving.

=== 2018 gubernatorial election ===
Cervantes announced his bid for Governor of New Mexico for the 2018 election in 2017 from the New Mexico Farm and Ranch Heritage Museum in Las Cruces. Considered a moderate to conservative Democrat in the campaign, he contested businessman Jeff Apodaca and then-congresswoman Michelle Lujan Grisham in the primary. A lawsuit attempted to disqualify Cervantes and Apodaca from the ballot due to a lack of signatures, though both eventually qualified for the ballot. He came in third in the primary, with 11.5% of the vote.

== Personal life ==
A Roman Catholic, Cervantes made news when a local parish priest and bishop advised Cervantes he would be denied Holy Communion because of support for a bill legalizing abortion.
