= William Burt (politician) =

American politician

Member of the New Mexico Senate
- In office January 1, 2013 – December 31, 2024
- Preceded by: Dianna Duran
- Succeeded by: Nick Paul
- Constituency: 40th district (2011–2012); 33rd district (2013–2024)

Personal details
- Born: Deming, New Mexico
- Party: Republican
- Education: New Mexico State University

William F. Burt (born in Deming, New Mexico) is an American politician who served as a Republican member of the New Mexico Senate from 2011 to 2024. Burt served in the district 40 seat from his appointment January 14, 2011 by Governor of New Mexico Susana Martinez to fill the vacancy caused by the resignation of Senator Dianna Duran, who was elected Secretary of State until the end of the legislative session.

== Education ==
Burt earned his bachelor's degree from New Mexico State University.

== Elections ==
- 2012 Redistricted to District 33, and with retiring incumbent Republican Senator Rod Adair retiring, Burt was unopposed for the June 5, 2012 Republican Primary, winning with 3,954 votes; and won the November 6, 2012 General election with 12,292 votes (65.3%) against Democratic nominee Stephanie Dubois.
