= David Gallegos =

American politician

Member of the New Mexico Senate from the 41st district
- Incumbent
- Assumed office January 19, 2021
- Preceded by: Gregg Fulfer

Member of the New Mexico House of Representatives from the 61st district
- In office January 15, 2013 – January 19, 2021
- Preceded by: Shirley Tyler
- Succeeded by: Randall Pettigrew

Personal details
- Born: Holman, New Mexico, U.S.
- Party: Republican
- Spouse: Sonya
- Children: 2
- Education: New Mexico Junior College (AA); University of the Southwest (BA)

David M. Gallegos (born in Holman, New Mexico) is an American politician serving as a member of the New Mexico Senate from the 41st district. Gallegos previously served in the New Mexico House of Representatives and was a member of the Eunice School Board for 21 years. He currently serves on the Senate Conservation Committee and the Senate Health and Public Affairs Committee. He completed a BA at the University of the Southwest. Gallegos is the Republican Party nominee for Lieutenant Governor of New Mexico in the 2026 election.

== Elections ==
- 2012 District 61 Republican Representative Shirley Tyler resigned from the Legislature and Gallegos, unopposed at the June 5, 2012 Republican Primary, won with 791 votes, then successfully garnered at the November 6, 2012 General election 3,654 votes (64.5%) against Democratic nominee Hector Ramirez.
- 2020 Gallegos successfully unseated incumbent state Senator Gregg Fulfer at the June 2, 2020 Republican primary for the New Mexico Senate.

Party political offices
Preceded by Ant Thornton	Republican nominee for Lieutenant Governor of New Mexico; 2026	Most recent
