= Benny Shendo =

American politician

Member of the New Mexico Senate from the 22nd district
- Incumbent
- Assumed office January 15, 2013
- Preceded by: Lynda Lovejoy

Secretary of the New Mexico Department of Indian Affairs
- In office April 2004 – 2007
- Appointed by: Bill Richardson

Personal details
- Party: Democratic
- Education: University of Colorado (BS)
- Website: bennyshendo.com

Benny J. Shendo Jr. is an American politician serving as a Democratic member of the New Mexico Senate, representing District 22 since January 15, 2013. Shendo's district covers Jemez Pueblo, New Mexico.

== Early life and education ==
Shendo earned his BS in business from the University of Colorado Boulder.

== Electoral history ==
- 2012 Shendo challenged District 22 incumbent Democratic Senator Lynda Lovejoy in the four-way June 5, 2012 Democratic Primary, winning with 1,989 votes (40.9%) and was unopposed for the November 6, 2012 General election, winning with 12,051 votes.
- 2008 When incumbent Democratic United States Representative Tom Udall ran for United States Senate and left New Mexico's 3rd congressional district seat open, Shendo ran in the six-way June 8, 2008 Democratic Primary but lost to New Mexico Public Regulation Commissioner Ben R. Luján. The latter won the three-way November 4, 2008 General election.
