= Roberto Gonzales =

American politician (born 1951)

Member of the New Mexico Senate from the 6th district
- Incumbent
- Assumed office December 20, 2019
- Preceded by: Carlos Cisneros

Member of the New Mexico House of Representatives from the 42nd district
- In office January 1995 – December 20, 2019
- Preceded by: Frederick Peralta
- Succeeded by: Daniel R. Barrone

Personal details
- Born: 1951 (age 74–75) Taos, New Mexico, U.S.
- Party: Democratic
- Education: University of New Mexico (BS); New Mexico Highlands University (MA)

Roberto 'Bobby' Jesse Gonzales (born 1951 in Taos, New Mexico) is an American politician and a Democratic member of the New Mexico House of Representatives representing District 42 since January 1995.

== Education ==
Gonzales earned his BS from the University of New Mexico and his MA from New Mexico Highlands University.

== Career ==
Prior to serving in the New Mexico House of Representatives, Gonzales was an educator.

When District 42 Democratic Representative Frederick Peralta left the Legislature and left the seat open, Gonzales ran in the five-way June 7, 1994 Democratic Primary, winning with 1,540 votes (36.5%) and won the November 8, 1994 General election with 4,205 votes (60.3%) against Republican nominee Telesfor Gonzales.

Gonzales was challenged in the June 4, 1996 Democratic Primary, winning with 2,969 votes (69.6%) and was unopposed for the November 5, 1996 General election.

Gonzales was unopposed for in his 1998, 2000, 2002, 2004, 2008, 2010, and 2012 Democratic primary campaigns.

After the death of Carlos Cisneros, Gonzales was appointed fill his vacant seat in the New Mexico Senate by Governor Michelle Lujan Grisham.
