= Mimi Stewart =

American politician (born 1947)

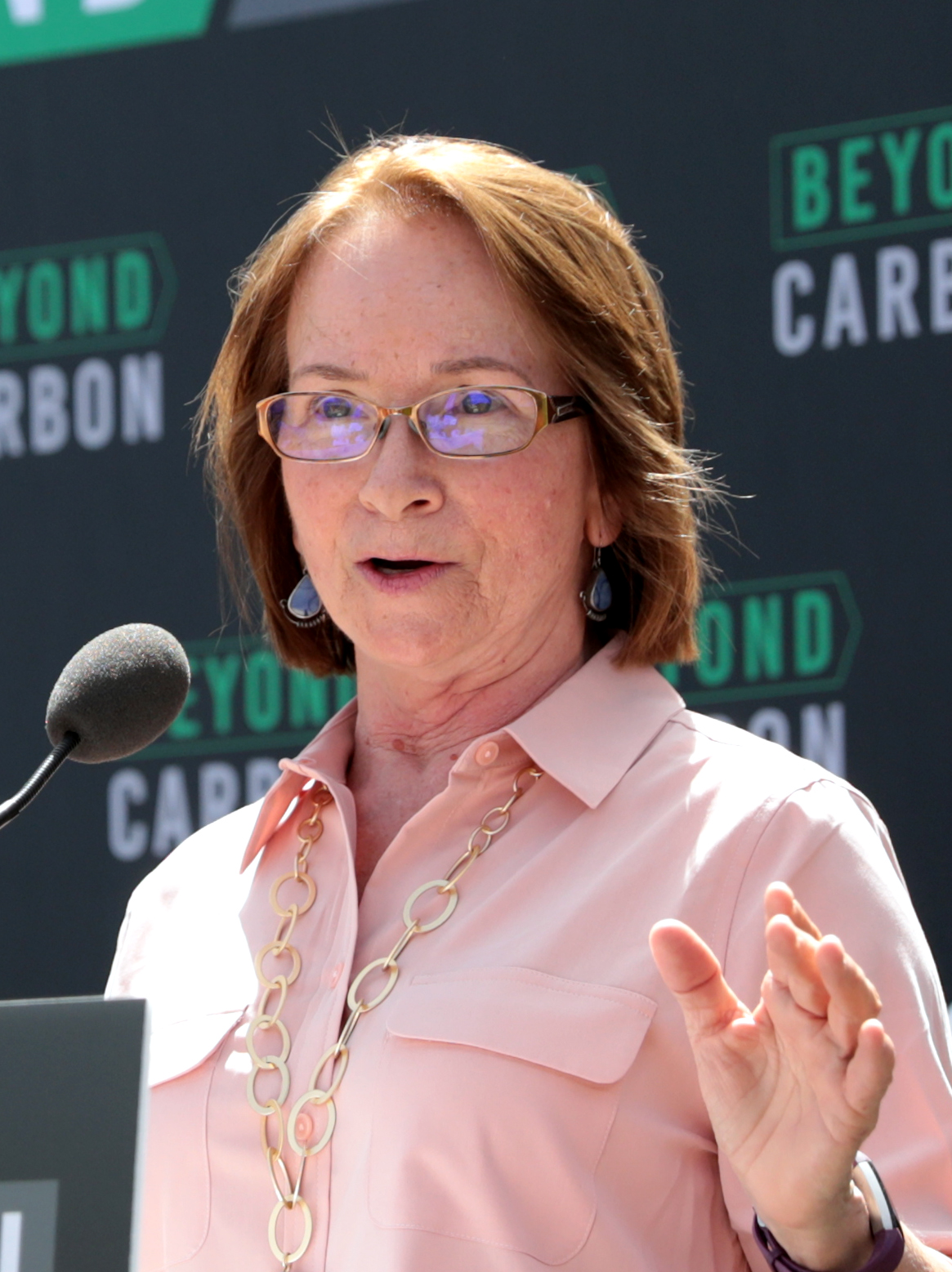

President pro tempore of the New Mexico Senate
- Incumbent
- Assumed office January 19, 2021
- Preceded by: Mary Kay Papen

Member of the New Mexico Senate from the 17th district
- Incumbent
- Assumed office January 2015
- Preceded by: Tim Keller

Member of the New Mexico House of Representatives from the 21st district
- In office January 1995 – January 2015
- Preceded by: Patricia Baca
- Succeeded by: Idalia Lechuga-Tena

Personal details
- Born: January 27, 1947 (age 79) Sarasota, Florida, U.S.
- Party: Democratic
- Education: Boston University (BA); Wheelock College (BS); University of New Mexico (attended)
- Website: Official website

Mimi Stewart (born January 27, 1947) is an American politician serving as a member of the New Mexico Senate, representing District 17 since December 2014. She was appointed to replace Tim Keller, who was elected to state auditor. Stewart previously served in the New Mexico House of Representatives, representing district 21 from January 1995 until her appointment to the Senate.

== Education ==
Stewart earned a Bachelor of Arts degree from Boston University and Bachelor of Science from Wheelock College. She took additional graduate courses at the University of New Mexico.

== Elections ==
- 2016 In the primary election held on June 7, Stewart defeated Shannon Robinson 58.6% (1,745 votes) to 41.4% (1,234 votes). Stewart was endorsed by the Albuquerque Journal in the primary. She is unopposed in the general election.
- 2014 Stewart was again unopposed in both the primary and general election.
- 2012 Stewart was unopposed for both the June 5, 2012 Democratic Primary, winning with 786 votes and the November 6, 2012 General election, winning with 4,961 votes.
- 1994 When District 21 Republican Representative Patricia Baca changed parties, Stewart challenged her in the June 7, 1994 Democratic Primary, winning with 1,330 votes (60%) and won the November 8, 1994 General election with 3,773 votes (54%) against Republican nominee Jack McMains.
- 1996 Stewart and returning 1994 Republican opponent Jack McMains were both unopposed for their June 4, 1996 primaries, setting up a rematch; Stewart won the November 5, 1996 General election against McMains.
- 1998 Stewart was unopposed for both the June 2, 1998 Democratic Primary, winning with 1,266 votes and the November 3, 1998 General election, winning with 4,507 votes.
- 2000 Stewart was unopposed for the 2000 Democratic Primary, winning with 1,207 votes and won the November 7, 2000 General election with 4,101 votes (54%) against Republican nominee Gregory Mortensen.
- 2002 Stewart was unopposed for the 2002 Democratic Primary, winning with 1,236 votes and the November 5, 2002 General election, winning with 3,228 votes (60.5%) against Republican nominee Armando Cordoba.
- 2004 Stewart was unopposed for both the June 1, 2004 Democratic Primary, winning with 853 votes and the November 2, 2004 General election, winning with 6,455 votes.
- 2006 Stewart was unopposed for both the June 6, 2006 Democratic Primary, winning with 792 votes and the November 7, 2006 General election, winning with 4,628 votes.
- 2008 Stewart was unopposed for the June 8, 2008 Democratic Primary, winning with 1,395 votes and won the November 4, 2008 General election with 6,015 votes (67.4%) against Republican nominee Howard De la Cruz-Bancroft.
- 2010 Stewart was unopposed for the June 1, 2010 Democratic Primary, winning with 859 votes and won the November 2, 2010 General election with 3,122 votes (52.1%) against Republican nominee Antoinette Baca.

New Mexico Senate
Preceded by Mary Kay Papen	President pro tempore of the New Mexico Senate; 2021–present	Incumbent
