= Natalie Figueroa (politician) =

American politician

Member of the New Mexico House of Representatives from the 30th district
- In office January 1, 2019 – December 31, 2024
- Preceded by: Nate Gentry
- Succeeded by: Diane Torres-Velásquez

Member of the New Mexico Senate from the 18th district
- Incumbent
- Assumed office January 1, 2025
- Preceded by: Bill Tallman

Personal details
- Party: Democratic
- Education: Stanford University (AB); University of California, Los Angeles (MEd)

Natalie Figueroa is an American politician and educator representing a portion of Bernalillo County as a member of the New Mexico Legislature. She represented the 30th district in the New Mexico House of Representatives from 2019 to 2024, and the 18th district in the New Mexico Senate since 2025.

== Education ==
Figueroa earned a Bachelor of Arts degree from Stanford University and a Master of Education from the University of California, Los Angeles.

== Career ==
Prior to entering politics, Figueroa worked as a Spanish teacher in Albuquerque. In 2016, she ran unsuccessfully for a seat in the New Mexico House of Representatives. She ran again in 2018, succeeding incumbent Republican and House Minority Leader, Nate Gentry, who did not run for re-election.
