= Harold Pope Jr. =

American politician

Harold Pope

Member of the New Mexico Senate from the 23rd district
- Incumbent
- Assumed office January 19, 2021
- Preceded by: Sander Rue

Personal details
- Born: May 26, 1974 (age 52) Pueblo, Colorado, U.S.
- Party: Democratic
- Education: University of New Mexico (BS); University of Florida (MS); Air University (MA)

Military service
- Branch/service: United States Air Force

Harold Pope Jr. (born May 26, 1974) is an American politician and retired United States Air Force officer serving as a member of the New Mexico Senate from the 23rd district. Elected in 2020, he defeated incumbent Republican Sander Rue. He assumed office on January 19, 2021.

== Early life and education ==
Pope was born and raised in Pueblo, Colorado. After graduating from high school, he enlisted in the United States Air Force and worked as a dental technician. Pope then left active duty and enlisted in the Air Force Reserve, earning a Bachelor of Science degree in biochemistry from the University of New Mexico. After graduation he was commissioned through the Air Force ROTC program and went back on active duty serving as a Chemist & Acquisitions Officer. Pope later earned a Master of Science in pharmaceutical chemistry from the University of Florida and a Master of Arts in operational leadership from the Air Command and Staff College at Air University.

== Career ==
After earning his bachelor's degree, Pope was commissioned in the Air Force as an officer, working as an acquisitions officer and chemist. He specialized in satellite programs, weapon systems, and nuclear deterrence. After his retirement, Pope was appointed as a facilities transition advisor in the administration of Albuquerque Mayor Tim Keller. In the November general election for the New Mexico Senate, Pope defeated incumbent Republican Sander Rue. When Pope assumed office in 2021, he became the first African-American member of the New Mexico Senate.

During his tenure as a state senator, Pope co-sponsored the 2021 Black Education Act. He has also cosponsored other legislation opposing book bans and private equity acquisitions of residential property, in addition to giving public comment against the acquisition of energy utility PNM's parent company TXNM Energy by Blackstone and Project Jupiter, a 1,400 acre data center construction operation in southern New Mexico. In 2023, Pope sponsered Senate Bill 34, which proposed a two-year waiting period before former state legislators could work as paid lobbyists.

=== Lieutenant governor campaign ===
In 2025, Pope announced his candidacy for Lieutenant Governor of New Mexico in the 2026 New Mexico gubernatorial election. He was defeated in the Democratic primary by Maggie Toulouse Oliver on June 2, 2026. Pope would have been the first African American Lieutenant Governor of New Mexico if elected.

On June 18, 2026, Toulouse Oliver suspended her campaign for Lieutenant Governor after winning the Democratic primary. Pope restarted his campaign for Lieutenant Governor following Toulouse Oliver's announcement, entering in competition with Commissioner of Public Lands Stephanie Garcia Richard. Deb Haaland, who won the Democratic nomination for Governor of New Mexico, provided an endorsement of Garcia Richard on June 26, 2026.
