= William Sharer =

American politician

Bill Sharer

Minority Leader of the New Mexico Senate
- Incumbent
- Assumed office January 21, 2025
- Preceded by: Gregory A. Baca

Member of the New Mexico Senate from the 1st district
- Incumbent
- Assumed office January 2001

Personal details
- Born: September 22, 1959 (age 66) Albuquerque, New Mexico, U.S.
- Party: Republican
- Education: New Mexico Military Institute (AA); New Mexico State University (BA)
- Website: State Senate website

William E. "Bill" Sharer (born September 22, 1959) is an American politician. He serves as a Republican member of the New Mexico Senate, representing the 1st district which is fully situated in San Juan County and consists of most if not all of the city of Farmington.

== Early life ==
Sharer was born in Albuquerque, New Mexico and grew up in Farmington, New Mexico. He graduated from Farmington High School, the New Mexico Military Institute and New Mexico State University.

== Career ==
He served as an infantryman in the United States Army.

He was elected to the New Mexico Senate in 2000, and he has served as a state senator since 2001, where he sits on the Corporations & Transportation and Conservation committees.

Sharer led the charge against same-sex marriage in New Mexico in 2013, filing a lawsuit against the clerk of Doña Ana County when he began issuing marriage licenses to same-sex couples.

New Mexico Senate
Preceded by Gregory A. Baca	Minority Leader of the New Mexico Senate; 2025–present	Incumbent
