= Katy Duhigg =

American attorney and politician

Member of the New Mexico Senate from the 10th district
- Incumbent
- Assumed office January 19, 2021
- Preceded by: Candace Gould

Personal details
- Born: Albuquerque, New Mexico, U.S.
- Party: Democratic
- Relations: Charles Duhigg (brother)
- Education: University of Oregon (BA); University of New Mexico (JD)

Katy Duhigg is an American attorney and politician serving as a member of the New Mexico Senate from the 10th district. Elected in 2020, Duhigg defeated incumbent Republican Candace Gould. She assumed office on January 19, 2021.

== Early life and education ==
Born and raised in Albuquerque, New Mexico, Duhigg earned a Bachelor of Arts degree from the University of Oregon and a Juris Doctor from the University of New Mexico School of Law. Duhigg's brother, Charles Duhigg, is a Pulitzer-prize winning journalist and non-fiction author.

== Career ==
Prior to her election, Duhigg worked as a legal analyst for the New Mexico House of Representatives Judiciary Committee. She is also a founding partner of the Duhigg Law Firm. Duhigg also worked as the state vice-chair of Common Cause New Mexico and was appointed to serve as Albuquerque City Clerk in August 2018. She stepped down as clerk in December 2019 to launch her run for the New Mexico Senate.

In the general election, Duhigg defeated incumbent Republican Candace Gould. She assumed office on January 19, 2020.
