= Gabriel Ramos (politician) =

American senator

Member of the New Mexico Senate from the 28th district
- Incumbent
- Assumed office January 1, 2025
- Preceded by: Siah Correa Hemphill
- In office January 15, 2019 – December 31, 2020
- Preceded by: Howie Morales
- Succeeded by: Siah Correa Hemphill

Personal details
- Party: Democratic (before 2024); Republican (2024–present)
- Education: Western New Mexico University (BS)

Gabriel Ramos is an American politician and businessman who serves as a member of the New Mexico Senate. Ramos represents the 28th district, which includes Socorro, Glenwood, and Silver City.

== Education ==
Ramos earned a Bachelor of Science degree in business and public administration from Western New Mexico University.

== Career ==
Prior to serving in the New Mexico Senate, Ramos served as Grant County Commissioner. He also worked as an insurance agent at State Farm and established a company, 1st Choice Satellite, Internet, And Home Security.

=== New Mexico Senate ===
Ramos took office on January 15, 2019, appointed to fill the seat left vacant by Howie Morales, who was elected Lieutenant Governor of New Mexico.

Ramos had been criticized for voting with Republicans against his party on several issues. He voted to oppose a minimum-wage increase and voted against legislation aimed at increasing gun control. Ramos also backed the controversial billion-dollar Gila River diversion as a Grant County commissioner.

In the 2020 Democratic primary, Ramos was defeated for re-election by school psychologist Siah Correa Hemphill.

Following Hemphill's retirement in the 2024 elections, Ramos announced that he would switch parties and run as a Republican for his former seat. Ramos won the seat as a Republican, defeating Democratic Grant County commissioner Chris Ponce.
