= Martin Hickey =

American politician

Member of the New Mexico Senate from the 20th district
- Incumbent
- Assumed office January 19, 2021
- Preceded by: William Payne

Personal details
- Born: Rockford, Illinois, U.S.
- Party: Democratic
- Spouse: Mary Cunnane (m. 1982)
- Children: 2
- Education: Johns Hopkins University (BA); Rush Medical College (MD); University of Wisconsin (MS)

Martin Hickey is an American politician, businessman, and retired physician serving as a member of the New Mexico Senate from the 20th district. Elected in 2020, he assumed office on January 19, 2021.

== Early life and education ==
Hickey was born in Rockford, Illinois. He earned a Bachelor of Arts degree in social and behavioral health from Johns Hopkins University, a Doctor of Medicine from Rush Medical College, and a Master of Science in preventive and administrative medicine from the University of Wisconsin School of Medicine and Public Health. He completed his residency at the University of Rochester Medical Center.

== Career ==
Prior to entering politics, Hickey worked as a physician. He is the chairman of the board and CEO of True Health New Mexico, an insurance company. Hickey has also worked as a professor of medicine at the University of New Mexico Hospital. In the Democratic primary for the 20th district in the New Mexico Senate, Hickey placed first in a field of four candidates. He defeated Republican nominee John C. Morton in the November general election. Hickey assumed office on January 19, 2021.

== Personal life ==
Hickey and his wife, Mary Cunnane, have two grown sons. Cunnane is an OBGYN.
