= Leo Jaramillo =

American politician

Member of the New Mexico Senate from the 5th district
- Incumbent
- Assumed office January 19, 2021
- Preceded by: Richard Martinez

Personal details
- Born: 1976 or 1977 (age 49)
- Party: Democratic
- Education: University of New Mexico (BA); College of Santa Fe (MA)

Leo V. Jaramillo (born 1976/1977) is an American politician serving as a member of the New Mexico Senate from the 5th district. Elected in 2020, he assumed office on January 19, 2021.

== Early life and education ==
Raised in Española, New Mexico, Jaramillo graduated from Española Valley High School. He earned a Bachelor of Arts degree in mass communication and journalism from the University of New Mexico, followed by a Master of Arts in education and curriculum design from the College of Santa Fe.

== Career ==
After earning his bachelor's degree, Jaramillo worked as a writer and producer for KRQE. After earning his master's degree, he worked as a middle school teacher in Belen, New Mexico. Since 2003, Jaramillo has worked as a communications specialist, staff assistant, training specialist, recruiter, financial analyst, and chief of staff at the Los Alamos National Laboratory.

Jaramillo was elected to the Rio Arriba County Commission in 2018. He was selected to serve as chair of the commission on January 28, 2020. In June 2020, Jaramillo defeated incumbent Democrat Richard Martinez for district five in the New Mexico Senate. A political progressive, Jaramillo criticized Martinez for his moderate voting record during the primary campaign. Jaramillo has advocated for the legalization of recreational marijuana in New Mexico.

In the November general election, Jaramillo defeated Republican nominee Diamantina Storment. He assumed office on January 19, 2021.

== Personal life ==
Jaramillo is gay. He lives in Española, New Mexico.
