= Carrie Hamblen =

American politician

Member of the New Mexico Senate from the 38th district
- Incumbent
- Assumed office January 19, 2021
- Preceded by: Mary Kay Papen

Personal details
- Born: Wisconsin, U.S.
- Party: Democratic
- Education: University of Texas at El Paso (BA); New Mexico State University (MA, MPA)

Carrie Hamblen is an American politician and former broadcast journalist serving as a member of the New Mexico State Senate from the 38th district. Elected in 2020, she assumed office on January 19, 2021. She is a member of the New Mexico Democratic Party.

== Early life and education ==
Hamblen was born in Wisconsin and raised in El Paso, Texas. Hamblen earned a Bachelor of Arts degree in broadcast journalism from the University of Texas at El Paso, followed by a Master of Arts in mass communication and Master of Public Administration from New Mexico State University.

== Career ==
In 1992, Hamblen joined KRWG as a student employee. She later became operations manager of the station and was a regional host of All Things Considered and Fresh Air before becoming the host of Morning Edition. For 15 years, she wrote, produced, and hosted a public affairs program called Images.

In the June 2020 Democratic primary, Hamblen defeated incumbent Senate President pro tempore Mary Kay Papen. The defeat has been characterized as an upset. A political progressive, Hamblen criticized Papen for her moderate voting record throughout the primary campaign. Hamblen defeated Republican nominee Charles Wendler in the November general election. She assumed office on January 19, 2021.

== Personal life ==
Hamblen is gay. She and her wife were one of the first same-sex couples to apply for a marriage license in Doña Ana County, New Mexico.
