= George Muñoz (politician) =

American politician

Member of the New Mexico Senate from the 4th district
- Incumbent
- Assumed office January 2009
- Preceded by: Lidio Rainaldi

Personal details
- Party: Democratic
- Education: University of Arizona

George Muñoz is an American politician and a Democratic member of the New Mexico Senate representing District 4 since January 2009.

== Education ==
Munoz graduated from Gallup High School and attended the University of Arizona but did not graduate.

== Elections ==
Muñoz was challenged in the three-way June 5, 2012 Democratic primary, winning with 2,614 votes (56.3%) and was unopposed for the November 6, 2012 general election, winning with 11,673 votes. When District 4 incumbent Democratic Senator Lidio Rainaldi retired and left the seat open, Muñoz ran in the four-way June 8, 2008 Democratic primary, winning with 1,933 votes (43.2%) and won the November 4, 2008 general election with 10,897 votes (75.6%) against Republican nominee Beatrice Woodward.

== Business career ==
Muñoz is a businessman and general contractor based in Gallup, New Mexico. He is the owner and operator of Muñoz Corporation, a firm specializing in construction and infrastructure development. His professional background as a "citizen-legislator" has frequently informed his policy focus on the New Mexico Senate Finance Committee, where he has advocated for fiscal restraint and oversight of state economic development subsidies.

According to state financial disclosures on the New Mexico Regulation and Licensing Department and New Mexico Secretary of State, Muñoz's commercial interests are primarily concentrated in McKinley County and include:

- Construction and Real Estate: Muñoz holds a general contractor license through the New Mexico Regulation and Licensing Department. He manages several real estate and development entities, including El Mercado Corp and Red Bluff Corp.
- Logistics and Services: He has held ownership stakes in local service ventures such as Kryptonite LLC and Giddy Up LLC.
- Banking: Muñoz has served on the board of directors for regional financial institutions, including Pinnacle Bank (formerly First National Bank of Gallup).

In 2023, Muñoz utilized his business oversight role as Finance Chair to request a formal audit from the State Auditor into the New Mexico Economic Development Department. He cited concerns regarding the transparency of the Local Economic Development Act (LEDA) and the Job Training Incentive Program (JTIP) in verifying job creation claims by private beneficiaries.
