= Joshua A. Sanchez =

American politician

Joshua Sanchez

Member of the New Mexico Senate
- Incumbent
- Assumed office January 1, 2021
- Preceded by: Clemente Sanchez
- Constituency: 30th district (2021–2024); 29th district (since 2025)

Personal details
- Born: Joshua Adolph Sanchez; 1981 (age 44–45) Belen, New Mexico, U.S.
- Party: Republican

Joshua Adolph Sanchez (born 1981) is an American businessman and politician who serves as a member of the New Mexico Senate. First elected in 2020, he represented the 30th district from 2021 to 2024, and the 29th district since 2025.

== Early life and education ==
Sanchez was born in Belen, New Mexico in 1981. He graduated from Belen High School, where he competed on the wrestling team. He also worked on his family's farm.

== Career ==
After graduating from high school, Sanchez worked in the construction industry before establishing his own business. For 15 years, Sanchez was also an employee of the Middle Rio Grande Conservancy District. In the 2020 Democratic primary, incumbent Senator Clemente Sanchez was defeated by Pamela Cordova. Sanchez defeated Cordova in the November general election. He assumed office on January 1, 2021.
