= New Mexico Senate =

Upper house of the New Mexico State Legislature

Coordinates: 35.6825°N 105.9396°W

New Mexico State Senate Senado de Nuevo México
- New Mexico State Legislature

Type
- Type: Upper house
- Term limits: None

History
- New session started: January 21, 2025

Leadership
- President: Howie Morales (D) since January 1, 2019
- President pro tempore: Mimi Stewart (D) since January 19, 2021
- Majority Leader: Peter Wirth (D) since January 17, 2017
- Minority Leader: William Sharer (R) since January 21, 2025

Structure
- Seats: 42
- Political groups: Majority: Democratic (26); Minority: Republican (16)
- Length of term: 4 years
- Authority: Article IV, New Mexico Constitution
- Salary: None + per diem

Elections
- Last election: November 5, 2024 (42 seats)
- Next election: November 7, 2028 (42 seats)
- Redistricting: Legislative Control

Meeting place
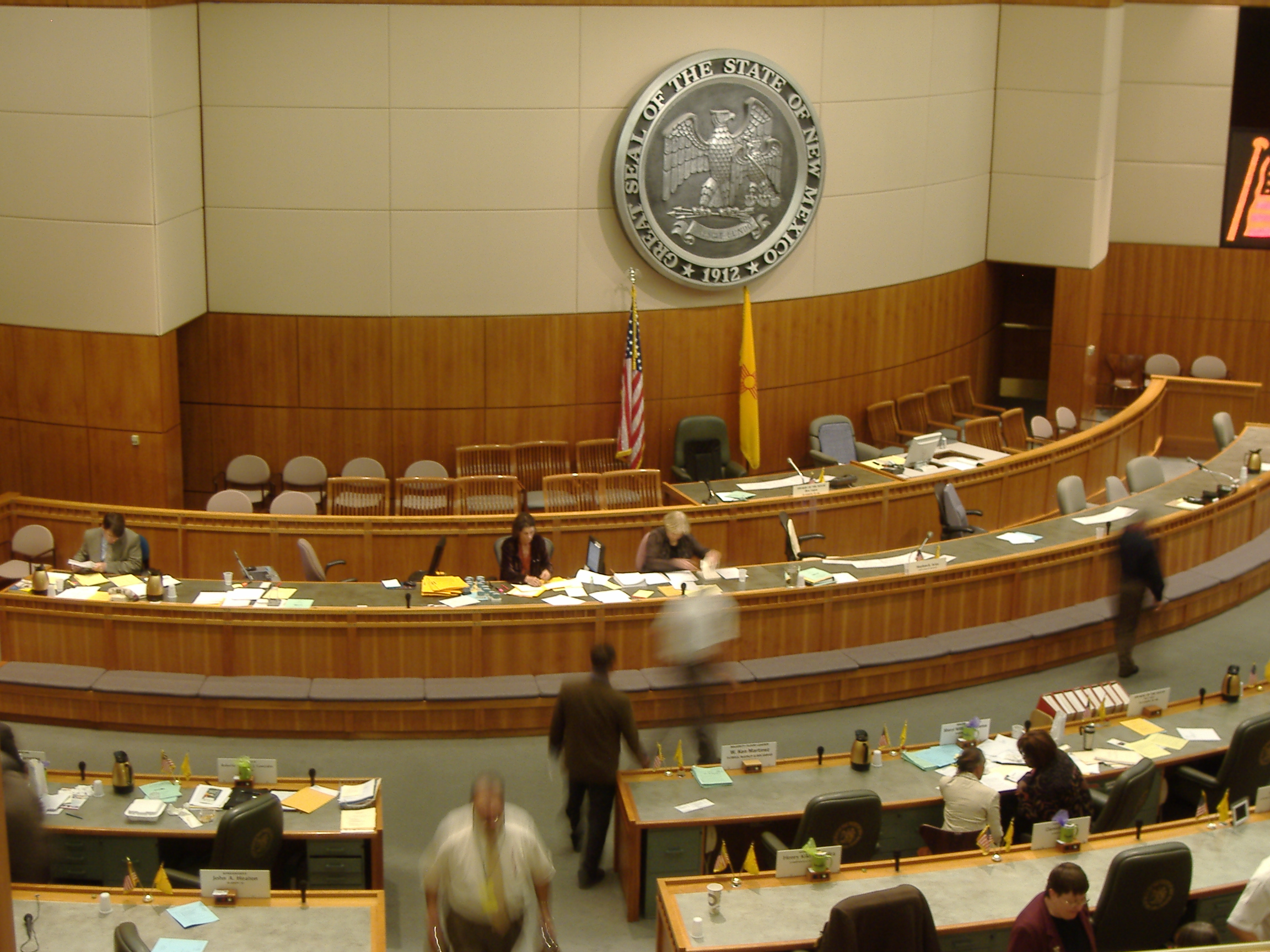
- State Senate Chamber; New Mexico State Capitol; Santa Fe, New Mexico

Website
- New Mexico State Legislature

The New Mexico State Senate (Spanish: Senado de Nuevo México) is the upper house of the New Mexico State Legislature, the lower house being the New Mexico House of Representatives.The Senate consists of 42 members, with each senator representing an equal number of single-member constituent districts across the state. All senatorial districts are divided to contain a population on average of 43,300 state residents. Members of the Senate are elected to four-year terms without term limits.

The Senate convenes at the New Mexico State Capitol building in Santa Fe.

== Composition ==
The makeup of the Senate for sessions from 2009–present is:

Affiliation	Party (Shading indicates majority caucus)		Total	Vacant
Affiliation	Democratic	Republican	Total	Vacant
End 2008	24	18	42	0
2009–2012	27	15	42	0
Begin 2013	25	17	42	0
End 2016	24	18	42	0
2017–2020	26	16	42	0
2021–2024	27	15	42	0
Begin 2025	26	16	42	0
Latest voting share	62%	38%		

=== Leadership ===
Position	Senator	District
President/Lieutenant Governor	Howie Morales	
President pro tempore	Mimi Stewart	17
Majority Leader	Peter Wirth	25
Majority Whip	Michael Padilla	14
Minority Leader	William Sharer	1
Minority Whip	Crystal Brantley	35

=== Current members ===
District	Name	Party	Residence	Start	Counties
1	William Sharer	Rep	Farmington	2000	San Juan (part)
2	Steve D. Lanier	Rep	Aztec	2024	San Juan (part)
3	Shannon Pinto	Dem	Tohatchi	2019 (Note: Originally appointed.)	McKinley (part), San Juan (part)
4	George Muñoz	Dem	Gallup	2008	Cibola (part), McKinley (part), San Juan (part)
5	Leo Jaramillo	Dem	Española	2020	Los Alamos (part), Rio Arriba (part), Sandoval (part), Santa Fe (part)
6	Roberto Gonzales	Dem	Ranchos de Taos	2019	Los Alamos (part), Rio Arriba (part), Santa Fe (part), Taos (part)
7	Pat Woods	Rep	Broadview	2012	Curry (part), Harding (part), Quay (part), Union
8	Pete Campos	Dem	Las Vegas	1990	Colfax, Guadalupe, Harding (part), Mora, Quay (part), San Miguel (part), Taos (part)
9	Cindy Nava	Dem	Bernalillo	2024	Bernalillo (part), Sandoval (part)
10	Katy Duhigg	Dem	Albuquerque	2020	Bernalillo (part)
11	Linda M. Lopez	Dem	Albuquerque	1996	Bernalillo (part)
12	Jay C. Block	Rep	Rio Rancho	2024	Bernalillo (part), Sandoval (part)
13	Debbie O'Malley	Dem	Albuquerque	2024	Bernalillo (part)
14	Michael Padilla	Dem	Albuquerque	2012	Bernalillo (part)
15	Heather Berghmans	Dem	Albuquerque	2024	Bernalillo (part)
16	Antoinette Sedillo Lopez	Dem	Albuquerque	2019	Bernalillo (part)
17	Mimi Stewart	Dem	Albuquerque	2015	Bernalillo (part)
18	Natalie Figueroa	Dem	Albuquerque	2024	Bernalillo (part)
19	Ant Thornton	Rep	Sandia Park	2024	Bernalillo (part), Sandoval (part), Santa Fe (part), Torrance (part)
20	Martin Hickey	Dem	Albuquerque	2020	Bernalillo (part)
21	Nicole Tobiassen	Rep	Albuquerque	2024	Bernalillo (part)
22	Benny Shendo	Dem	Jemez Pueblo	2012	Bernalillo (part), McKinley (part), Rio Arriba (part), San Juan (part), Sandoval (part)
23	Harold Pope Jr.	Dem	Albuquerque	2020	Bernalillo (part)
24	Linda Trujillo	Dem	Santa Fe	2024	Santa Fe (part), Socorro (part)
25	Peter Wirth	Dem	Santa Fe	2008	Santa Fe (part)
26	Moe Maestas	Dem	Albuquerque	2022	Bernalillo (part)
27	Pat Boone	Rep	Elida	2024	Chaves (part), Curry (part), De Baca, Lea (part), Roosevelt
28	Gabriel Ramos	Rep (Note: Ramos previously served in the state senate as a Democrat from 2019–2020.)	Silver City	2024	Grant (part), Hidalgo (part), Luna (part)
29	Joshua A. Sanchez	Rep	Bosque	2020	Socorro (part), Valencia (part)
30	Angel Charley	Dem	Acoma	2024	Bernalillo (part)
31	Joe Cervantes	Dem	Las Cruces	2012	Chaves (part), Doña Ana (part), Otero (part)
32	Candy Ezzell	Rep	Roswell	2024	Chaves (part), Eddy (part)
33	Rex Wilson	Rep	Ancho	2026	Lincoln, Otero (part)
34	James G. Townsend	Rep	Artesia	2024	Eddy (part), Otero (part)
35	Crystal Brantley	Rep	Elephant Butte	2020	Catron, Doña Ana (part), Grant (part), Hidalgo (part), Luna (part), Sierra, Socorro (part)
36	Jeff Steinborn	Dem	Las Cruces	2016	Doña Ana (part)
37	William Soules	Dem	Las Cruces	2012	Doña Ana (part)
38	Carrie Hamblen	Dem	Las Cruces	2020	Doña Ana (part)
39	Liz Stefanics	Dem	Los Cerrillos	2016	San Miguel (part), Santa Fe (part), Torrance (part), Valencia (part)
40	Craig Brandt	Rep	Rio Rancho	2012	Sandoval (part)
41	David Gallegos	Rep	Eunice	2020	Eddy (part), Lea (part)
42	Larry R. Scott	Rep	Hobbs	2024	Chaves (part), Eddy (part), Lea (part)

== See also ==
- New Mexico House of Representatives
