= Michigan State Law Review =

- Discipline: Law
- Language: English
- Edited by: Diana Ramos

Publication details
- History: 1931–present
- Publisher: Michigan State University College of Law (United States)
- Frequency: 5 issues per year

Standard abbreviations
- Bluebook: Mich. St. L. Rev.
- ISO 4: Mich. State Law Rev.

Indexing
- ISSN: 1087-5468
- LCCN: 2004250071
- OCLC no.: 423706799

Links
- Journal homepage

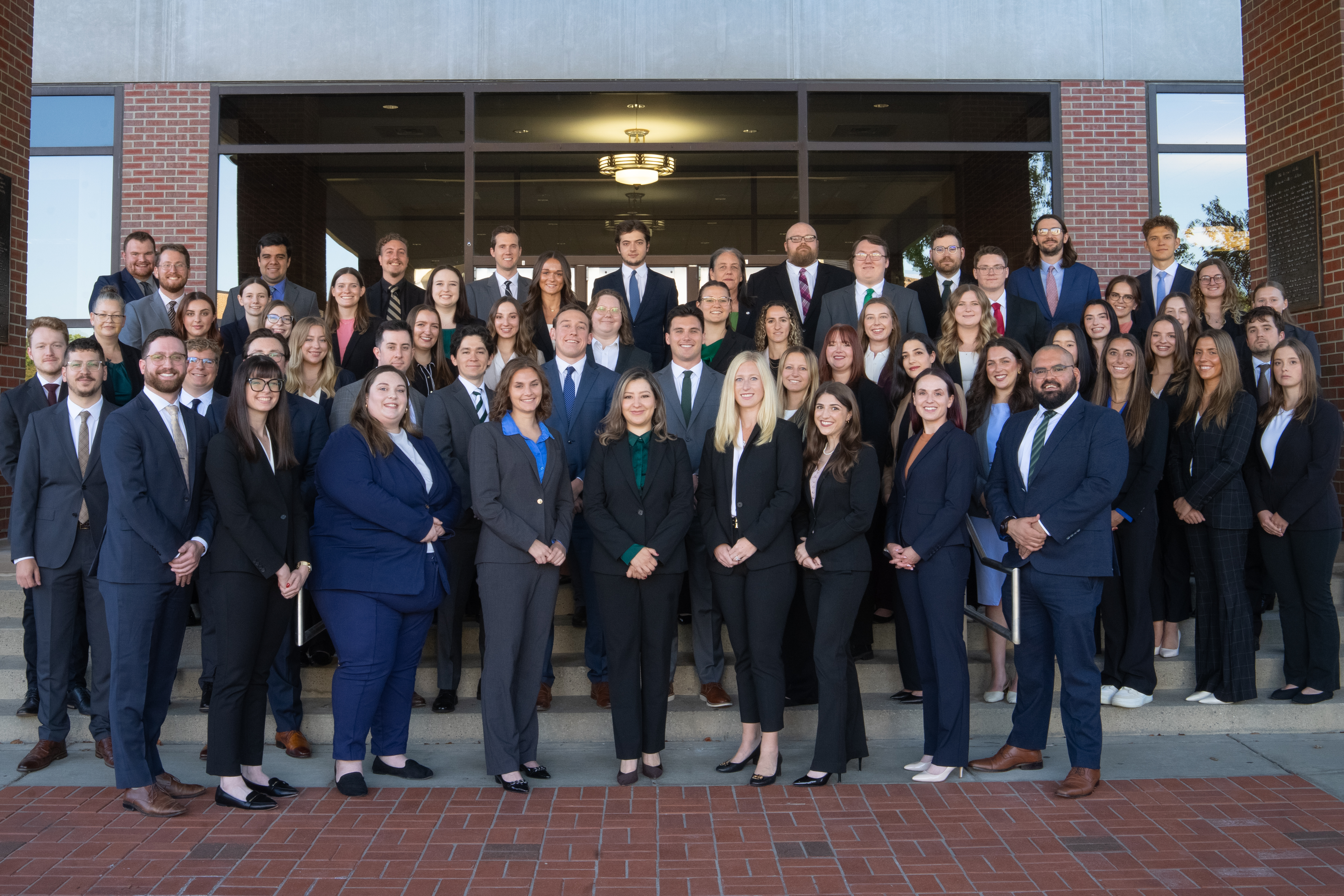
MSLR 2025-2026

The Michigan State Law Review is an American law review published by students at Michigan State University College of Law. In the 2024, Washington & Lee School of Law ranking of law reviews, the Michigan State Law Review was ranked 56th among “flagship” print American law journals with a score of 18.11 out of 100, 39th for “impact,” and per W&L Law, the journal is ranked 68th among all student-edited, print, English law journals, a dramatic increase from its ranking of 332nd in 2003. The journal hosts an annual academic conference of global legal experts with past events covering issues such as autonomous vehicles, quantitative legal analysis, civil rights, and intellectual property. Professor David Blankfein-Tabachnick has served as Faculty Advisor of the journal since his appointment in 2016. In 2018, the journal began publishing an annual "Visionary Article Series," which features the work of one prominent legal scholar per year.

Michigan State Law Review has published the works of numerous legal scholars, such as Robert Post, a legal scholar and former dean of Yale Law School, Mark Lemley, a professor at Stanford Law School and renowned intellectual property scholar, Scott L. Kafker, a justice on the Supreme Judicial Court of Massachusetts, and Nathalie Martin, professor of consumer and bankruptcy law at University of New Mexico School of Law. The journal has also published the scholarship of Dennis Archer, a former Michigan Supreme Court justice and an alumnus of the school.

== History ==
Prior to the founding of the Michigan State Law Review, the school published a periodical known as The Brief Case. Although this was met with approval, potential authors who were unaffiliated with the school requested to be published. In response, a law review was established. The Michigan State Law Review, then known as the Detroit Law Review, released its first publication in June 1931. At the time, the school was known as the Detroit College of Law. After seven years, the Detroit Law Review ceased publication in 1938, but was brought back for three issues during the 1947–48 academic year. Following another hiatus, the journal was revived in 1975.

In conjunction with the school's integration into Michigan State University, the journal went through a series of name changes: Detroit College of Law Review (1975–1995), Detroit College of Law at Michigan State University Law Review (1995–1999), The Law Review of Michigan State University, Detroit College of Law (1999–2003), Michigan State DCL Law Review (2003-2003), and Michigan State Law Review (2003–present).

== Publications ==
The Michigan State Law Review publishes five issues per year, one of which is a symposium that focuses on a particular legal topic. Additionally, the journal publishes an annual "Visionary Article Series" article.

=== Symposia ===
Each year, one of the Michigan State Law Review's issues is a symposium, a legal academic conference that focuses on a particular area of law. In the 2018–2019 academic year, the Michigan State Law Review transitioned to a book symposium format, where authors visit the College of Law and workshop their pieces for the symposium in front of journal members and law school faculty. In recent years, the annual symposia topics have been as follows:

- 2013 (Fall): Whether the United States should become a party to the United Nations Convention on the Elimination of All Forms of Discrimination Against Women
- 2014 (Spring): Reflections on Brown v. Board of Education and the Civil Rights Act of 1964, in conjunction with the Michigan State University College of Education and the University of Missouri–Kansas City
- 2014 (Fall): Public Domain(s): Law, Generating Knowledge, and Furthering Innovation in the Information Economy
- 2015 (Spring): Civil rights and persuasive arguments in issues such as same-sex rights, abortion law, racial conflicts, voting rights, and animal rights
- 2015 (Fall): Quantitative analysis in law
- 2016 (Spring): Autonomous vehicle technology and the law
- 2017 (Spring): The emerging legal analytics industry and empirical legal studies
- 2018 (Spring): Truth and Reconciliation in Post-Ferguson America
- 2018-2019: The intersection of private values and public law
- 2019-2020: The intersection of law, language, and technology
- 2020-2021: Property Ownership and Entitlement: Gender, Religion, & Culture
- 2021-2022: The Evolving Realm of Soft IP: Copyrights, Trademarks, Trade Secrets, and Publicity Rights
- 2022-2023: Safe Harbors in the Shadows: Extending 10b5-1 Plans to Cover Shadow Trading

=== Visionary Article Series ===
In 2018, Michigan State Law Review began publishing a "Visionary Article Series" that aims to "honor a single legal scholar who has had a profound impact on a field of law by publishing a work of his or hers with a special designation." In the inaugural year, the journal published an article on administrative regulation by Richard Revesz, director of the American Law Institute and professor and former dean at the New York University School of Law. In 2019, the series continued with an article by Yale Law School professor and former dean Robert Post that analyzed the chief justiceship of William Howard Taft. In 2020, the journal published an article by the Guido Calabresi Professor of Law at Yale Law School, professor Daniel Markovits. Currently, Michigan State Law Review is in the process of publishing the 2021 Visionary Scholar Article by Eduardo Peñalver, professor and dean of Cornell Law School, which will precede a planned 2022 article by Akhil Amar, professor of law at Yale Law School.

== Notable Authors Published ==
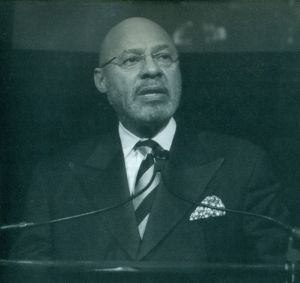
Dennis Archer (pictured) published multiple articles in the journal when it was known as the Detroit College of Law Review.

Michigan State Law Review has published the works of many prominent legal scholars, including:

- Erwin Chemerinsky, legal scholar and Dean at the University of California Berkeley Law
- Akhil Amar, professor at Yale Law School who the Supreme Court of the United States has cited to on 45 occasions
- Dennis Archer, former Michigan Supreme Court justice and former mayor of Detroit, Michigan
- Anita Bernstein, legal scholar and Professor of Law at Brooklyn Law School
- Anya Bernstein, researcher and professor at the University of Buffalo School of Law
- Jim Chen, constitutional law scholar and former dean of the University of Louisville Brandeis School of Law
- Deborah Denno, legal scholar and professor at the Fordham University School of Law
- Seymour Drescher, historian and professor at the University of Pittsburgh
- Paul Finkelman, legal historian and president of Gratz College
- Clayton Gillette, professor at NYU School of Law
- Scott L. Kafker, Associate Justice of the Supreme Judicial Court of Massachusetts
- Edmund Kitch, professor at the University of Virginia School of Law
- Lisa Larrimore Ouellette, associate professor at Stanford Law School
- Mark Lemley, professor of law at Stanford Law School and the Director of the Stanford Law School Program in Law, Science & Technology, as well as a founding partner of the law firm of Durie Tangri LLP
- Michael A. Livermore, professor at University of Virginia School of Law
- Julia Mahoney, professor at the University of Virginia School of Law
- Nathalie Martin, legal researcher and professor at the University of New Mexico School of Law
- Linda McClain, professor at the Boston University School of Law and former professor at Hofstra Law School
- Robert Merges, professor at the University of California, Berkeley School of Law
- Frank Partnoy, legal scholar and professor of the University of California Berkeley School of Law
- Richard J. Pierce, legal scholar and professor at the George Washington University School of Law
- Robert Post, legal scholar and former dean of Yale Law School
- Richard Revesz, director of the American Law Institute and professor at the New York University School of Law
- Duane Rudolph, former visiting assistant professor of law at Peking University School of Transnational Law
- Loren A. Smith, Senior Judge of the United States Court of Federal Claims
- Matthew Stephenson, professor at Harvard Law School
- Shlomit Yanisky-Ravid, professor at Fordham University School of Law
- Edward J. McCaffery, professor at USC Gould School of Law
- Jens David Ohlin, Dean of Cornell Law School

== Editors-in-Chief ==
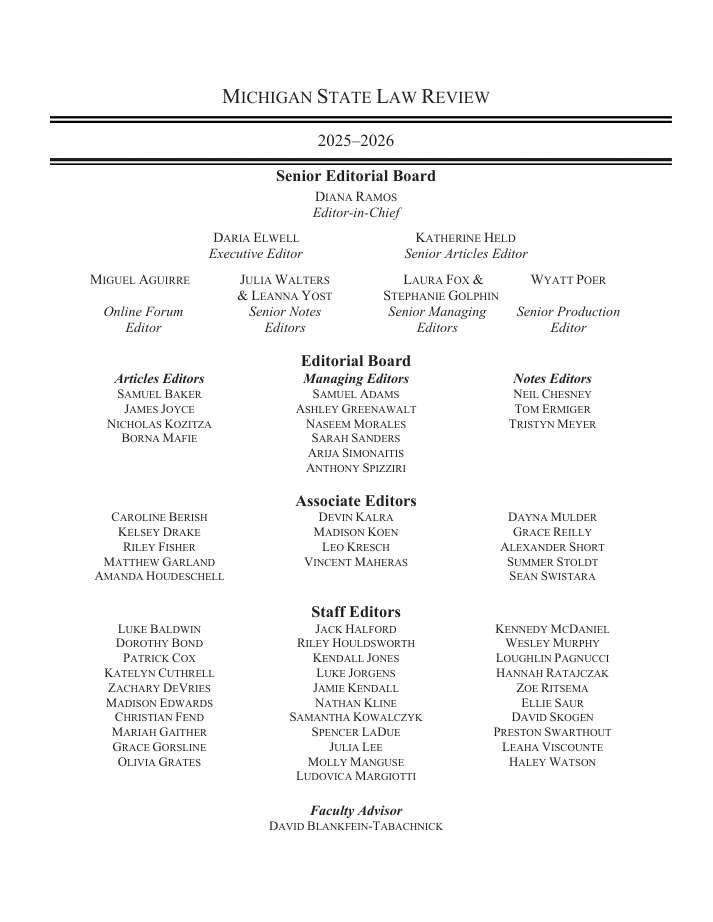
Michigan State Law Review Editorial Staff for the 2025-2026 publication year.

- 2011-2012: Amanda Josephine-Hicks Frank
- 2012-2013: Lisa Colomba Ferro Hackett
- 2013-2014: Rachael Roseman
- 2014-2015: Leah Jurss
- 2015-2016: Jennifer Muse
- 2016-2017: Christopher Kozak
- 2017-2018: Andrew Newton
- 2018-2019: Celia Kaechele
- 2019-2020: Emily Sosolik
- 2020-2021: Kylee Nemetz
- 2021-2022: Brandon Paul Cross
- 2022-2023: Hugh J. Theut
- 2023-2024: Katrin Kelley
- 2024-2025: Anna Marie Maxwell
- 2025-2026: Diana Ramos
