= Scarnecchia =

Scarnecchia (pronounced [skarˈnekkja]) is an Italian surname. Notable people with the surname include:

- Dante Scarnecchia (born 1948), American football player and coach
- Roberto Scarnecchia (born 1958), Italian footballer and manager
- Steve Scarnecchia, American football coach
- Suellyn Scarnecchia, American legal scholar
- Orlando Carmelo Scarnecchia (1903–1985), known as John Scarne, American magician and author
