= Right of revolution =

Concept in political philosophy

In political philosophy, the right of revolution or right of rebellion is the right of the people to "alter or abolish" a government that acts against their common interests or threatens the safety of the people without justifiable cause. Stated throughout history in one form or another, the belief in this right has been used to justify various revolutions, including the American Revolution, French Revolution, Texas Revolution, Syrian Revolution, Russian Revolution, and the Iranian Revolution.

== History ==
=== Early examples ===
==== Ancient China ====
To justify their overthrowing of the earlier Shang dynasty, the kings of the Zhou dynasty (1122–256 BCE) of China promulgated the concept known as the Mandate of Heaven, that Heaven would bless the authority of a just ruler, but would be displeased and withdraw its mandate from a despotic ruler. The Mandate of Heaven would then transfer to those who would rule best. Chinese historians interpreted a successful revolt as evidence that the Mandate of Heaven had passed on. Throughout Chinese history, rebels who opposed the ruling dynasty made the claim that the Mandate of Heaven had passed, giving them the right to revolt. Ruling dynasties were often uncomfortable with this, and the writings of the Confucian philosopher Mencius (372–289 BCE) were often suppressed for declaring that the people have the right to overthrow a ruler that did not provide for their needs.

==== Ancient Rome ====
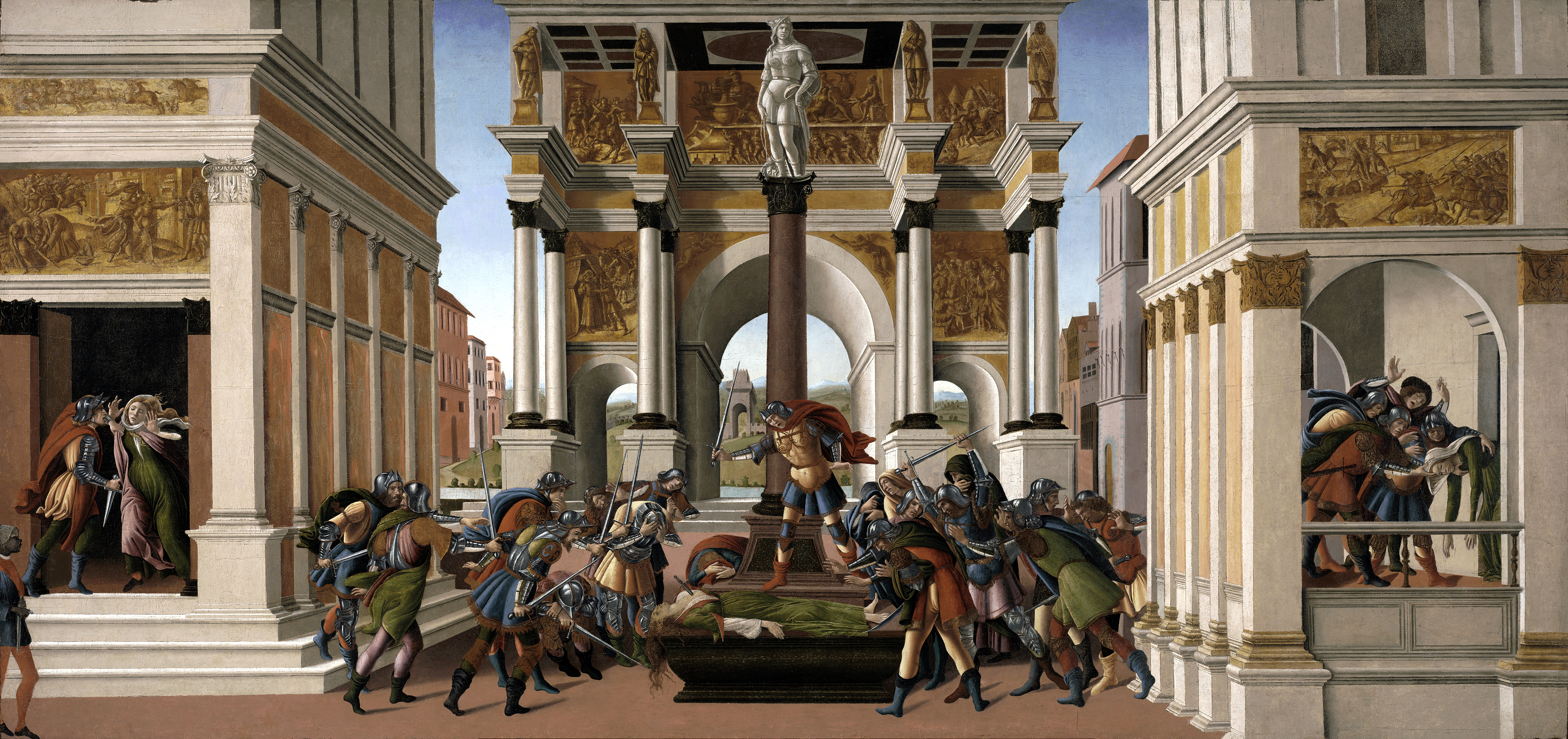
The Roman Republic was established following the overthrow of the Roman monarchy.

The populist leader Tiberius Gracchus tried to justify depriving power from tribune Marcus Octavius by arguing that a tribune "stands deprived by his own act of honours and immunities, by the neglect of the duty for which the honour was bestowed upon him". For Gracchus, he "who assails the power of the people is no longer a tribune at all".

He strengthened his argument by highlighting the precedent of the overthrow of Tarquin the Proud "when he acted wrongfully; and for the crime of one single man, the ancient government under which Rome was built was abolished forever." As historian Edward Gibbon observes, after Tarquin's overthrow, "the ambitious Roman who should dare to assume their title or imitate [Tarquin's] tyranny was devoted to the infernal gods: each of his fellow-citizens was armed with the sword of justice; and the act of Brutus, however repugnant to gratitude or prudence, had been already sanctified by the judgement of his country."

After the death of Augustus, the soldier Percennius fomented mutiny in the legions of Pannonia. Believing they had the right to violently rebel to get better treatment and greater appreciation from the state, he rhetorically asked the common soldiery why they submitted to the centurions while military life entailed such low pay and so many years in service. Many soldiers shared his feelings. According to the historian Tacitus, "The throng applauded from various motives, some pointing to the marks of the lash, others to their grey locks, and most of them to their threadbare garments and naked limbs."

The Praetorian Subrius Flavus justified his right of revolution against Emperor Nero on the grounds that Nero's crimes meant he no longer deserved the love of the people: "I began to hate you when you became the murderer of your mother and your wife, a charioteer, an actor, and an incendiary."

In 285 C.E., Maximian suppressed a rebellion of Gallic peasants violently resisting exploitation by their masters. These fought for their natural rights against the miserable conditions they were placed under. Gibbon says that they "asserted the natural rights of men, but they asserted those rights with the most savage cruelty".

==== Medieval Europe ====
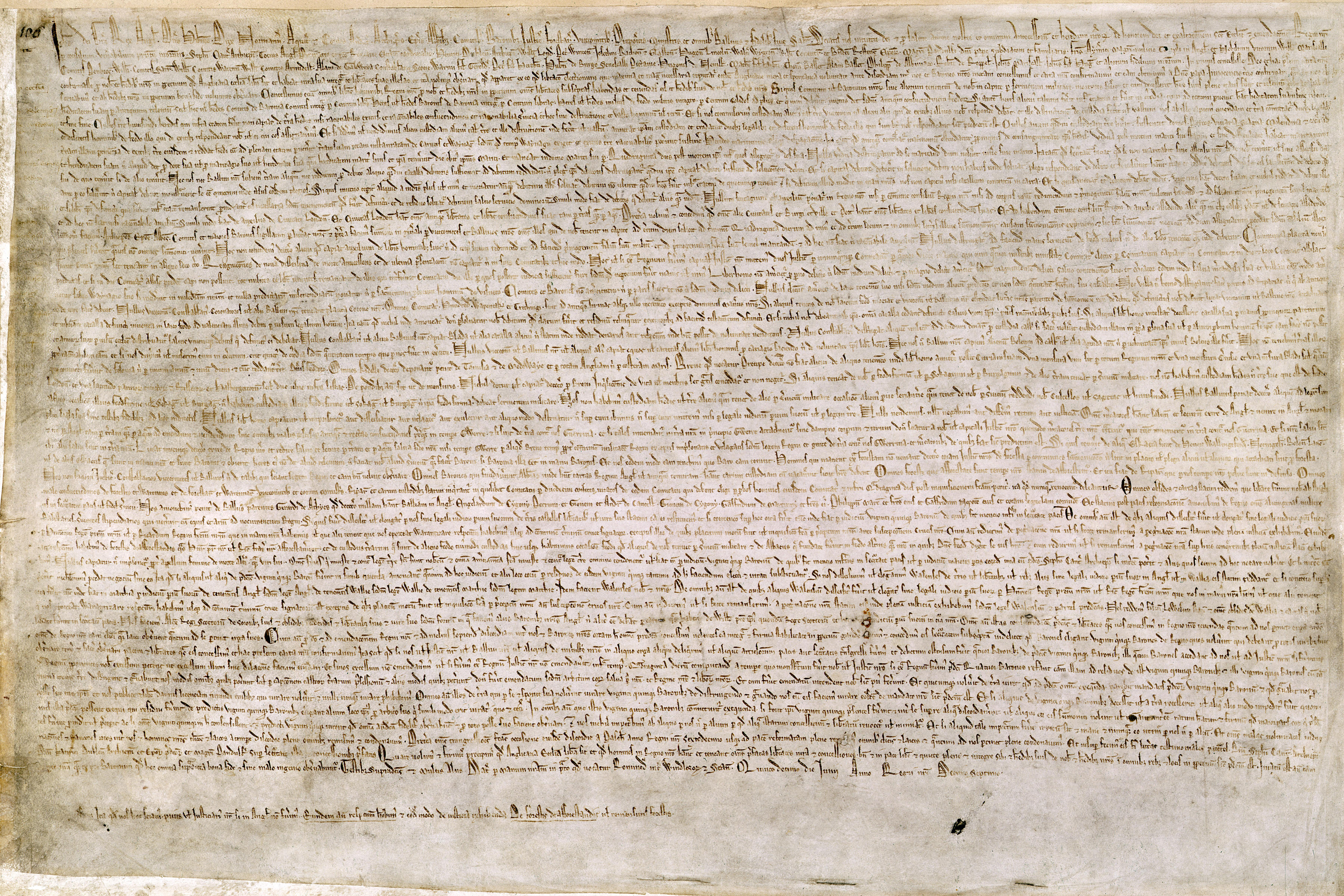
Magna Carta marks one of the earliest attempts to limit a sovereign's authority and it is seen as a symbol of the rule of law.

One example of the emergence of a right of revolution can be traced back to Þorgnýr the Lawspeaker, who in 1018 had a dramatic confrontation with the King of Sweden. The lawspeaker claimed the King of Sweden was accountable to the people and would be overthrown by them if he continued with his unpopular war with Norway.

Another example were the semi-mythical Charters of Sobrarbe, allegedly issued in the Pyrenees in the 850s, which enshrined the Iberian legal principle that "laws come before kings." Specifically, the 6th charter of Sobrarbe (first mentioned in 1117) specified that "If He [the King] should hereafter tyrannise the kingdom against the fueros or liberties, the kingdom should be free to choose another king, even if he were a pagan," thereby enshrining the right of rebellion against the King. During the High Middle Ages, the Charters of Sobrarbe were used both in the kingdom of Navarre and in the kingdom of Aragon to thwart royal authority, and in the medieval kingdom of Aragon to create the figure of the Justicia de Aragón, an office first mentioned in 1115, appointed by the Aragonese parliament, and with ample powers to veto any action of the King deemed to against the customs and laws of the kingdom; this provided a uniquely complete institutional and constitutional framework with which to disobey the King. The legal lemma "Obedezco pero no cumplo" [I obey, but do not comply] found in Castilian law, likewise stemming from this tradition, was used to justify disobeying the King's orders that were deemed to go against the law; this legal principle was used in everything from bypassing censorship to justifying open rebellions, as e.g. was famously exploited by Hernán Cortés to justify his otherwise illegal invasion and conquest of Mexico against the explicit orders of the King of Castile and his officers in Cuba.

Another example is Magna Carta, an English charter issued in 1215, which required the King to renounce certain rights and accept that his will could be bound by the law. It included a "security clause" that gave the right to a committee of barons to overrule the will of the King through force if needed. Magna Carta directly influenced the development of parliamentary democracy and many constitutional documents, such as the United States Constitution. The Golden Bull of 1222 was a golden bull, or edict, issued by King Andrew II of Hungary. The law established the rights of Hungary's noblemen, including the right to disobey the King when he acted contrary to law (jus resistendi). The Golden Bull is often compared to Magna Carta; the Bull was the first constitutional document of the nation of Hungary, while Magna Carta was the first constitutional charter of the nation of England.

Thomas Aquinas also writes about the right to resist tyranny in the Summa Theologica. He considers a law not to be a law at all, but an act of violence, if it contradicts either human or Divine good, overextends the power of the lawgiver, or hampers different parts of society unequally. For Aquinas, overthrowing a tyrant does not make a population seditious. Rather, the tyranny of tyrants means they commit "sedition", by which Aquinas means disturbance of those who work together lawfully for the good of the multitude:

Indeed it is the tyrant rather that is guilty of sedition, since he encourages discord and sedition among his subjects, that he may lord over them more securely; for this is tyranny, since it is ordered to the private good of the ruler and to the injury of the multitude.

Nicole Oresme, in his Livre de Politiques, categorically denied any right of resistance. John of Salisbury advocated direct revolutionary assassination of unethical tyrannical rulers in his Policraticus.

==== Early modern Europe ====
Theological notions of the right of revolution were elaborated in the early modern period. The Jesuits, especially Robert Bellarmine and Juan de Mariana, were widely known and often feared for advocating resistance to tyranny and often tyrannicide—one of the implications of the natural law focus of the School of Salamanca.

John Calvin believed something similar. In a commentary on the Book of Daniel, he observed that contemporary monarchs pretend to reign "by the grace of God", but the pretense was "a mere cheat" so that they could "reign without control". He believed that "Earthly princes depose themselves while they rise up against God", so "it behooves us to spit upon their heads than to obey them". When ordinary citizens are confronted with tyranny, he wrote, ordinary citizens have to suffer it. But magistrates have the duty to "curb the tyranny of kings", as had the Tribunes of the Plebs in ancient Rome, the Ephors in Sparta, and the Demarchs in ancient Athens. That Calvin could support a right of resistance in theory did not mean that he thought such resistance prudent in all circumstances. At least publicly, he disagreed with the Scottish Calvinist John Knox's call for revolution against the Catholic Queen Mary I Tudor of England.

The Catholic Church shared Calvin's prudential concerns – the Pope condemned Guy Fawkes' Gunpowder Plot, and Regnans in Excelsis was widely considered to be a mistake. Instead, the safest course of action for the people was to endure tyranny for as long as it could be borne, rather than run the larger risks of armed revolution.

The right of revolution was expounded by the Monarchomachs in the context of the French Wars of Religion, and by Huguenots thinkers who legitimized tyrannicides.

In the last chapter of The Prince, Niccolò Machiavelli exhorts the Medici family to take up violent insurrection "to liberate Italy from the barbarians". He explains why contemporary circumstances justify the Medici's right of revolution:

Italy, left without life, waits for him who shall yet heal her wounds and put an end to the ravaging and plundering of Lombardy, to the swindling and taxing of the kingdom and of Tuscany, and cleanse those sores that for long have festered. It is seen how she entreats God to send someone who will deliver her from these wrongs and barbarous insolencies. It is seen also that she is ready and willing to follow a banner if only someone will raise it.

=== Philosophical views ===
==== John Locke ====
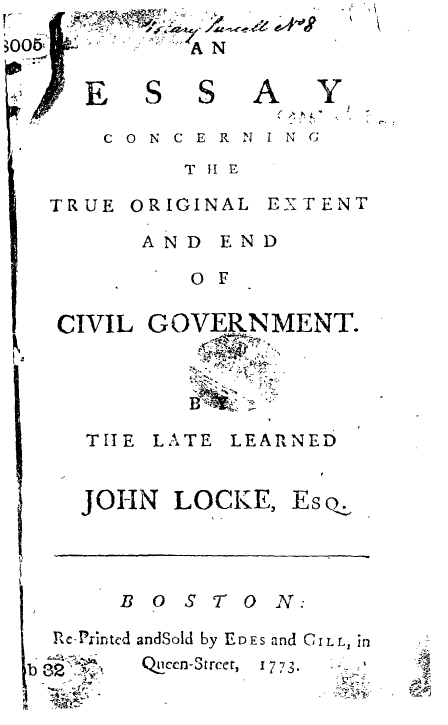
Two Treatises of Government, written by John Locke, developed the idea of "right of revolution". This notion was used as a basis for the Glorious Revolution of 1688.

Perhaps no other major philosopher wrote as much about the right of revolution as Enlightenment thinker John Locke. He developed the concept in his Two Treatises of Government, especially the last two chapters, "Of Tyranny" and "Of the Dissolution of Government". The right formed an important part of his social contract theory, in which he defined the basis of social relationships. Locke said that under natural law, all people have the right to life, liberty, and private property; under the social contract, the people could instigate a revolution against the government when it acted against the interests of citizens, to replace the government with one that served the interests of citizens. In some cases, Locke saw revolution as an obligation. For him, the right of revolution acted as a safeguard against tyranny.

Locke defended the right of revolution in Two Treatises of Government in this way:

Whenever the Legislators endeavor to take away, and destroy the Property of the People, or to reduce them to Slavery under Arbitrary Power, they put themselves into a state of War with the People, who are thereupon absolved from any farther Obedience, and are left to the common Refuge, which God hath provided for all Men, against Force and Violence. Whensoever therefore the Legislative shall transgress this fundamental Rule of Society; and either by Ambition, Fear, Folly or Corruption, endeavor to grasp themselves, or put into the hands of any other an Absolute Power over the Lives, Liberties, and Estates of the People; By this breach of Trust they forfeit the Power, the People had put into their hands, for quite contrary ends, and it devolves to the People, who have a Right to resume their original Liberty.

For Locke, these governments undid themselves by standing in the way of a citizen's right to property. He believed that "governments are dissolved" when "they endeavour to invade the property of the subject", since it is the right of the people to "choose and authorise a legislative" and accompanying institutions that act "as guards and fences to the properties of all society". In other writings, he used the analogy of a robber to explain why tyrannical infringement on property makes for unjust law: "Should a robber break into my house, and, with a dagger at my throat, make me seal deeds to convey my estate to him, would this give him any title? Just such a title by his sword has an unjust conqueror who forces me into submission. The injury and the crime is equal, whether committed by the wearer of a crown or some petty villain." Thus, according to Locke, if a government acts against a citizen's right of property, that citizen may exercise his right of revolution against that government.

Locke drew on the Old Testament story of Hezekiah's rebellion against the King of Assyria to make the case that God supported any people rebelling against unrighteous rule, saying that "it is plain that shaking off a power which force, and not right, hath set over any one, though it hath the name of rebellion, yet it is no offence before God, but that which He allows and countenances".

Like Aquinas, Locke believed that the truly seditious or rebellious individuals are not those who change the legislative to ensure public wellbeing, but the despots who violated public wellbeing in the first place with their illegitimate laws: "For when men, by entering into society and civil government, have excluded force, and introduced laws for the preservation of property, peace, and unity among themselves, those who set up force again in opposition to the law, do rebellare – that is, bring back again the state of war, and are properly rebels". Also like Aquinas, Locke considered it just for a subject to disobey any ruler overextending his political power. In A Letter Concerning Toleration, he argued that "if the law, indeed, be concerning things that lie not within the verge of the magistrates authority, ... men are not in these cases obliged by that law, against their consciences."

However, Locke was not only a proponent of fighting tyranny through civil disobedience of unjust laws. He also suggested using violent insurrection in situations where an illegitimate centre of power, such as a rogue executive, has used force to subdue the supreme power in the land, that is, the legislature:

For having erected a legislative with an intent that [the people] should exercise the power of making laws, ... when they are hindered by any force from what is so necessary to the society, and wherein the safety and preservation of the people consists, the people have a right to remove it by force. In all states and conditions the true remedy of force without authority is to oppose force to it.

==== Jean-Jacques Rousseau ====
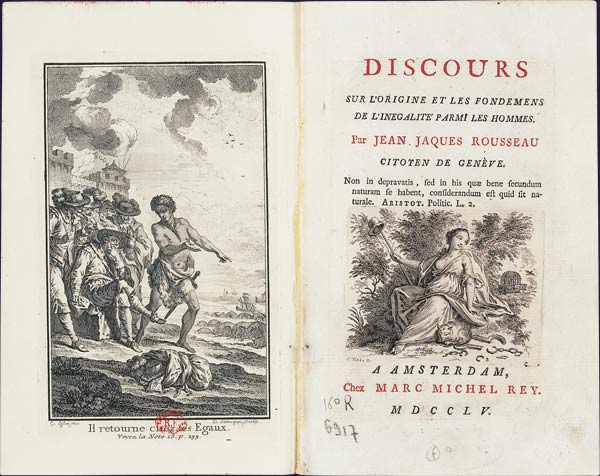
Rousseau's Discourse on Inequality argues in favour of the right of revolution against despots.

Later, Jean-Jacques Rousseau would be in agreement on Locke's point about force, stating in his work On the Origin of Inequality that:

The contract of government is so completely dissolved by despotism, that the despot is master only so long as he remains the strongest; as soon as he can be expelled, he has no right to complain of violence. The popular insurrection that ends in the death or deposition of a Sultan is as lawful an act as those by which he disposed, the day before, of the lives and fortunes of his subjects. He was maintained by force alone, it is force alone that overthrows him.

==== Immanuel Kant ====
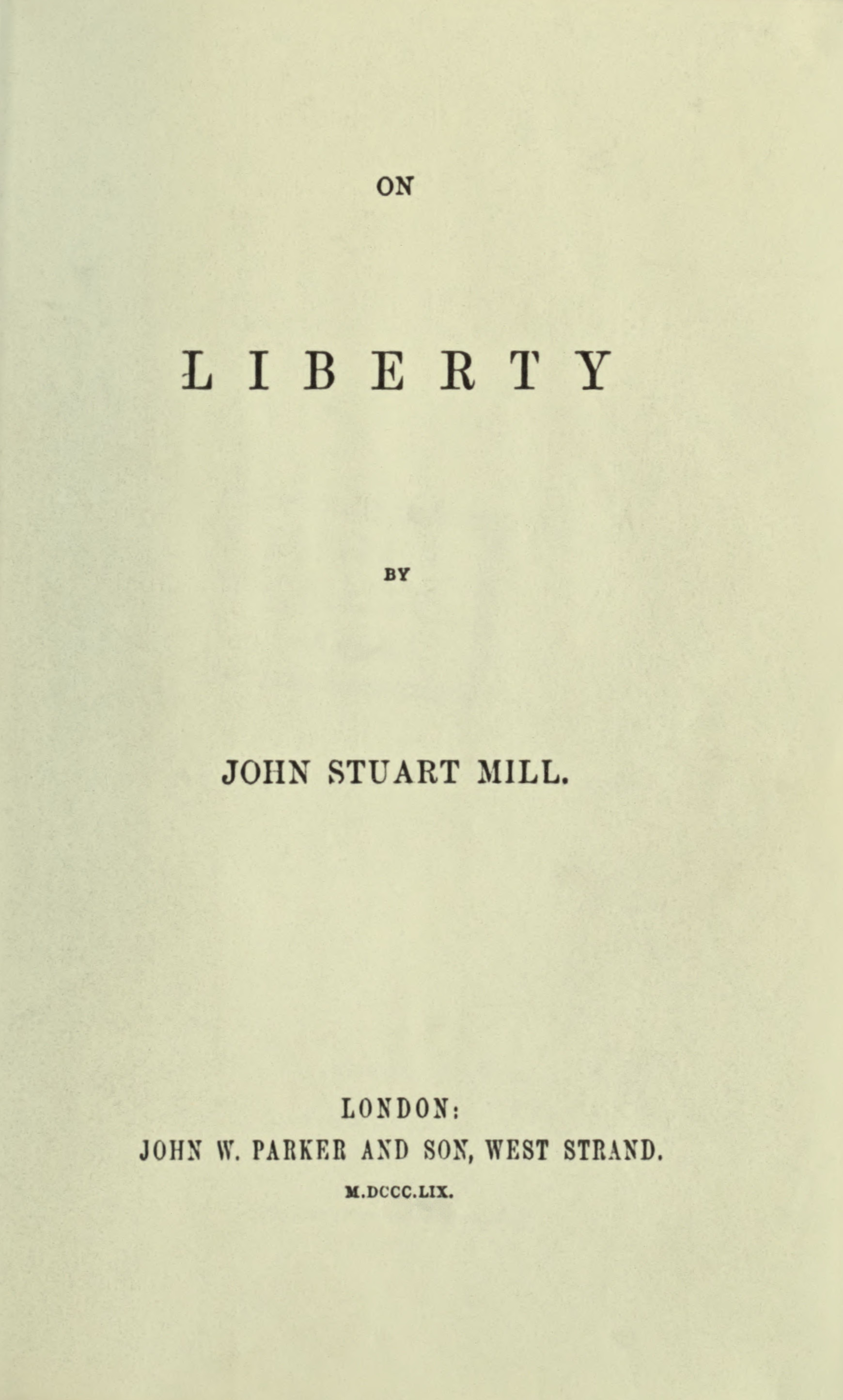
John Stuart Mill was a proponent of the right to revolution in the name of liberty.

Not all Enlightenment thinkers supported the rebellion principle. Immanuel Kant would have strongly disagreed with Locke and Rousseau as regards the notion of there being any general principle of a right to revolution. He believed that "if the ruler or regent, as the organ of the supreme power, proceeds in violation of the laws, as in imposing taxes, recruiting soldiers, and so on, contrary to the law of equality in the distribution of the political burdens, the subject may oppose complaints and objections (gravamina) to this injustice, but not active resistance." He reaffirms this repeatedly in The Metaphysics of Morals, stating that "there is no right of sedition, and still less of revolution", the reason being that "it is only by submission to the universal legislative will, that a condition of law and order is possible." Moreover, Kant believed that any "forcible compulsion of [the dethronement of a monarch], on the part of the people, cannot be justified under the pretext of a right of necessity (casus necessitatis)".

==== John Stuart Mill ====
John Stuart Mill believed in a morally justifiable form of right to revolution against tyranny, placing him firmly in the tradition of Aquinas, Locke, and Rousseau. In his introduction to On Liberty, he gave an account of the historical limitation of kingly power by the multitude, a conflict he termed "liberty". This progress was sought "by obtaining a recognition of certain immunities, called political liberties or rights, which it was to be regarded as a breach of duty in the ruler to infringe, and which if he did infringe, specific resistance, or general rebellion, was held to be justifiable". On the question of tyrannicide, Mill came down firmly in favour of the virtue of "the act of a private citizen in striking down a criminal, who, by raising himself above the law, has placed himself beyond the reach of legal punishment or control, [since it] has been accounted by whole nations, and by some of the best and wisest of men, not a crime, but an act of exalted virtue".

==== Samuel Johnson ====
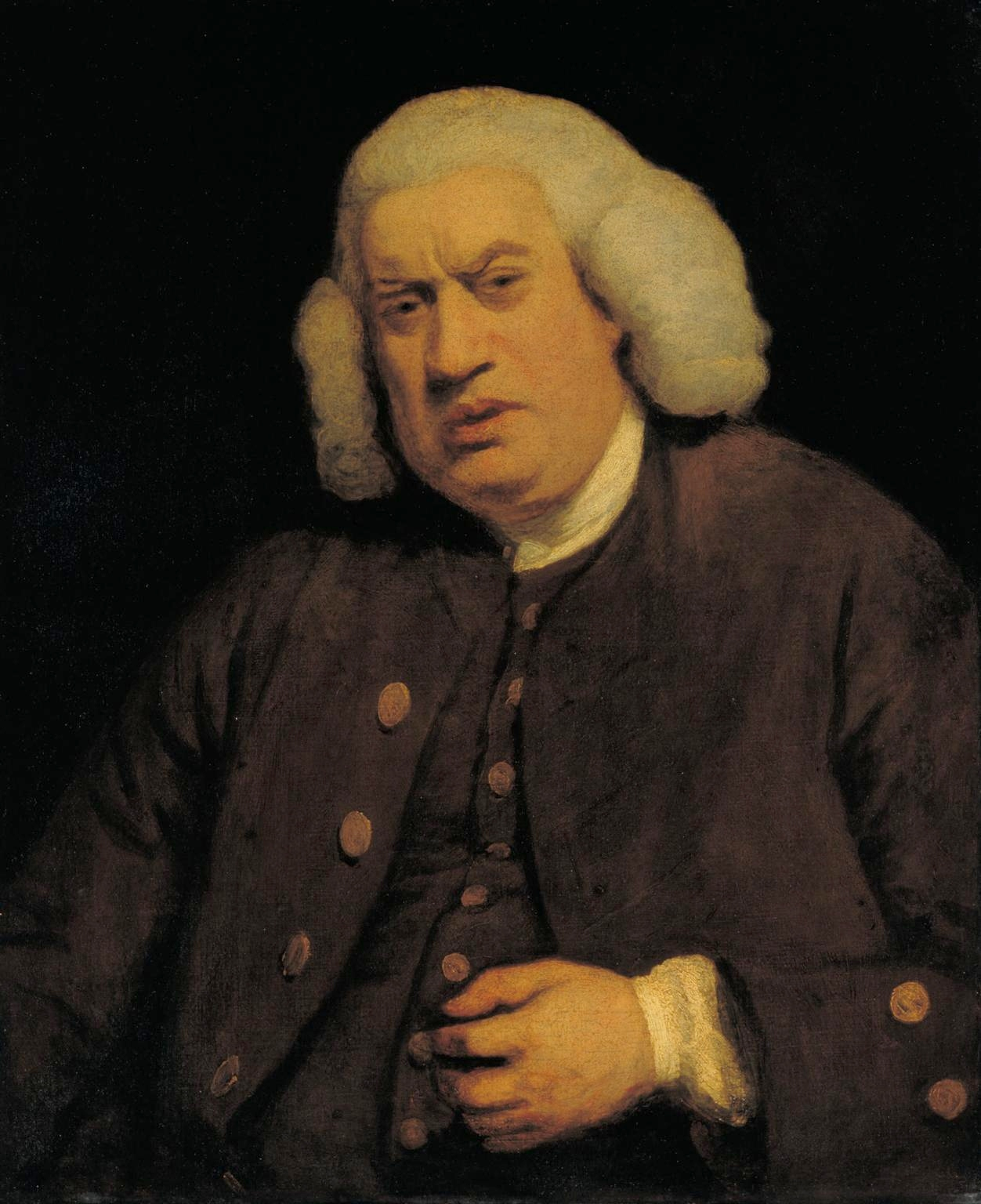
Samuel Johnson saw the justifications for the right to rebel against tyranny.

Scottish biographer James Boswell noted the literary critic Samuel Johnson's attack on the widespread assumption that "the King can do no wrong":

If the abuse be enormous, Nature will rise up, and claiming her original rights, overturn a corrupt political system.

Boswell emphasised this sentence "with peculiar pleasure, as a noble instance of that truly dignified spirit of freedom which ever glowed in his heart". Johnson seemed to believe that some form of a right to revolution inhered in natural law. He considered "that in no government power can be abused long. Mankind will not bear it. If a sovereign oppresses his people to a great degree, they will rise and cut off his head. There is a remedy in human nature against tyranny, that will keep us safe under every form of government. Had not the people of France thought themselves honoured as sharing in the brilliant actions of Louis XIV, they would not have endured him; and we may say the same of the King of Prussia's people."

=== Use in history ===
Revolutionary movements subsequent to this, all drew on Locke's theory as a justification for the exercise of the right of revolution.

==== The Glorious Revolution ====
During the Glorious Revolution of 1688, the Parliament of England effectively deposed James II of England and replaced him with William III of Orange-Nassau, due to the former's unacceptable leanings towards absolutism and Catholicism. Although Locke's treatise was published the year after, his ideas were already widely current in the English political system at the time.

The storming of the Bastille on 14 July 1789 has come to symbolize the French Revolution, when a people rose up to exercise their right of revolution.

Although Locke claimed that his book's purpose was to justify William III's ascension to the throne, it has been argued that the bulk of the writing was instead completed between 1679 and 1680 during the Exclusion Crisis, which attempted to prevent James II from ever taking the throne in the first place. Anthony Ashley-Cooper, 1st Earl of Shaftesbury, Locke's mentor, patron and friend, introduced the bill, but it was ultimately unsuccessful. Alternatively, the work is better associated with the revolutionary conspiracies that swirled around what would come to be known as the Rye House Plot.

==== American Revolution ====
The right to revolution played a large part in the writings of revolutionaries in the Thirteen Colonies of British America during the American Revolution. Thomas Paine's political tract Common Sense used the concept as an argument for rejection of the British monarchy and separation from the British Empire, as opposed to merely self-government within it. The right was also cited in the United States Declaration of Independence, written by Thomas Jefferson, two thirds of which consists of a list of the wrongs claimed to have been committed by George III which violated the colonists' natural right to life, liberty, and property. According to the declaration:

Whenever any form of government becomes destructive of these ends, it is the right of the people to alter or to abolish it, and to institute a new government, laying its foundation on such principles, and organizing its powers in such form, as to them shall seem most likely to effect their safety and happiness.

However, the Revolution did change course to set certain limits on the right of rebellion. In Federalist No. 28, Alexander Hamilton successfully made the case for a federal standing army, in opposition to Locke's principle that a republican government rules not by violence, but by law. Hamilton thought:

That seditions and insurrections are, unhappily, maladies as inseparable from the body politic as tumours and eruptions from the natural body; that the idea of governing all at all times by the simple force of law (which we have been told is the only admissible principle of republican government) has no place but in the reveries of those political doctors whose sagacity disdains the admonitions of experimental instruction.

Simply put, "An insurrection, whatever may be its immediate cause, eventually endangers all government." However, Hamilton did point out that the wide geography of the United States meant that a federal army could not provide absolute limitation on the right of revolution, since, "If the federal army should be able to quell the resistance of one State, the distant States would have it in their power to make head with fresh forces."

==== The French Revolution ====
The right of revolution was also included in the 1793 preface to the French Constitution of 1793 during the French Revolution. This preface from 24 June 1793 contained a declaration of the rights of man and citizen including right to rebellion in §35: "When the government violates the rights of the people, insurrection is for the people, and for every portion thereof, the most sacred of rights and the most indispensable of duties."

==== The Texas Revolution ====
The right of revolution is a principle element of the Texas Declaration of Independence, signed November 7, 1835 by a convention of delegates representing the collective interests of Tejano and Texian settlers in the newly designated District of Texas, part of the Mexican state Coahuila y Tejas until President Antonio López de Santa Anna enacted the Seven Laws which stripped states of autonomy and divided them into administrative districts subject to a strong central government. The declaration lists grievances and asserts the right to secede from a tyrannical government based on the natural right to self-defense and boldly establishes Texas to be an independent republic.

We are, therefore, forced to the melancholy conclusion, that the Mexican people have acquiesced in the destruction of their liberty, and the substitution therefor of a military government; that they are unfit to be free, and incapable of self government. The necessity of self-preservation, therefore, now decrees our eternal political separation. We, therefore, the delegates with plenary powers of the people of Texas, in solemn convention assembled, appealing to a candid world for the necessities of our condition, do hereby resolve and declare, that our political connection with the Mexican nation has forever ended, and that the people of Texas do now constitute a free, Sovereign, and independent republic, and are fully invested with all the rights and attributes which properly belong to independent nations; and, conscious of the rectitude of our intentions, we fearlessly and confidently commit the issue to the decision of the Supreme arbiter of the destinies of nations.

==== American Civil War ====
The inherent (rather than constitutional) right to revolt was cited in the year prior the civil war's start as justifying the secession of the Confederate States of America.

==== Coups in El Salvador ====
The right to insurrection was invoked in the Revolution of the 44, 1931 Salvadoran coup d'état, and 1979 Salvadoran coup d'état.

== Nature of the right ==
=== Individual or collective right ===
Although some explanations of the right of revolution leave open the possibility of its exercise as an individual right, it was clearly understood to be a collective right under English constitutional and political theory.

As Pauline Maier has noted in her study From Resistance to Revolution, "private individuals were forbidden to take force against their rulers either for malice or because of private injuries". Instead, "not just a few individuals, but the 'Body of the People' had to feel concerned" before the right of revolution was justified and with most writers speaking of a "'whole people who are the Public', or the body of the people acting in their 'public Authority', indicating a broad consensus involving all ranks of society".

In the second of his Two Treatises of Government, John Locke quotes the jurist William Barclay as stating "That particular men are allowed ... to have no other remedy but patience; but the body of the people may with, with respect, resist intolerable tyranny, for when it is moderate they ought to endure it."

=== Right versus duty ===
Some philosophers argue that it is not only the right of a people to overthrow an oppressive government but also their duty to do so. Jeanne Hersch opines, "It seems to me that the duty to rebel is much more understandable than that right to rebel, because the right to rebellion ruins the order of power, whereas the duty to rebel goes beyond and breaks it."

Morton White writes of the American revolutionaries, "The notion that they had a duty to rebel is extremely important to stress, for it shows that they thought they were complying with the commands of natural law and of nature's God when they threw off absolute despotism." The U.S. Declaration of Independence states that "when a long train of abuses and usurpations, pursuing invariably the same Object evinces a design to reduce them under absolute Despotism, it is their right, it is their duty, to throw off such Government" (emphasis added). The phrase "long train of abuses" is a reference to John Locke's similar statement in the Second Treatise of Government, where he explicitly established overthrow of a tyrant as an obligation. Martin Luther King Jr. likewise held that it is the duty of the people to resist unjust laws.

== Preconditions ==
=== In philosophical discourse ===
Certain theories of the right of revolution impose significant preconditions on its exercise, sometimes limiting its invocation to the most dire circumstances. Aristotle insisted that "men of rank" who "excel in virtue have the best right of all to rebel". Although Plato argued that a dissident should openly criticise his nation's policies, "provided that his words are not likely either to fall on deaf ears or to lead to the loss of his own life", he also stipulated against seemingly necessary violent insurrection: "force against his native land he should not use in order to bring about a change of constitution, when it is not possible for the best constitution to be introduced without driving men into exile or putting them to death".

Thinkers often emphasise the great responsibility in taking hold of the right to revolution. Aquinas believed that would-be revolutionaries held no right to rebel against a tyrant if "the tyrant's rule be disturbed so inordinantly that his subjects suffer greater harm from the consequent disturbance than from the tyrant's government". Michel de Montaigne was equally cautious, warning that "to establish a better regimen in the stead of that which a man has overthrown, many who have attempted it have foundered". Even the American Declaration of Independence admits that "Prudence, indeed, will dictate that governments long established should not be changed for light and transient causes".

In Leviathan, Thomas Hobbes argued that, since they have consented to invest their sovereign with the right of rulership, monarchical subjects can only change rulers with the original sovereign's permission. He states that "they that are subjects to a monarch cannot without his leave cast off monarchy and return to the confusion of a disunited multitude; nor transfer their person from him that beareth it to another man, or other assembly of men". Elsewhere he emphasises this point by saying that "the commands of them that have the right to command are not by their subjects to be censured nor disputed".

John Locke believed in the precondition that the right of violent insurrection could only be retained by those challenging tyranny, stipulating "that force is to be opposed to nothing but to unjust and unlawful force". The right of revolution only gave a people the right to rebel against unjust rule, not any rule: "whoever, either ruler or subject, by force goes about to invade the rights of either prince or people, and lays the foundation for overturning the constitution and frame of any just government, he is guilty of the greatest crime I think a man is capable of".

In Two Treatises of Government, Locke discusses the pro-monarchy philosopher William Barclay's notions about the preconditions for the right of revolution against a monarch: "First. He says it must be with reverence. Secondly. It must be without retribution or punishment; and the reason he gives is, 'because an inferior cannot punish a superior'." Locke disagreed with both these preconditions, explaining that it is impossible to strike against any opposition 'with reverence' and that an oppressor loses his superiority by being an oppressor. Elsewhere Barclay insists that a king must be dethroned as a precondition for the right of revolution against a monarchy: "The people, therefore, can never come by a power over him unless he does something that makes him cease to be a king", which may only happen if the king tries to overturn his kingdom or make his rule dependent on force provided by another country.

In his treatise Politics, Aristotle disapproves of the Cretan constitution's provision for the aristocratic right of revolution against the Cosmi, the ten most important magistrates in the country: "Worst of all is the suspension of the office of Cosmi, a device to which the nobles often have recourse when they will not submit to justice." For Aristotle, this is evidence of oligarchical interference codified into supposedly constitutional, republican government. In contrary to this view, the French Enlightenment thinker Montesquieu believed that this institution successfully hindered the abuse of power, thanks to the existing precondition of a powerful patriotism felt by the Cretans towards their island.

=== During the American Revolution ===
The presentation of the draft of the Declaration of Independence in John Trumbull's Declaration of Independence depicts another idealization of the exercise of the right of revolution.

In the American Revolutionary context, one finds expressions of the right of revolution both as subject to precondition and as unrestrained by conditions. On the eve of the American Revolution, for example, Americans considered their plight to justify exercise of the right of revolution. Alexander Hamilton justified American resistance as an expression of "the law of nature" redressing violations of "the first principles of civil society" and invasions of "the rights of a whole people". For Thomas Jefferson, the Declaration was the last-ditch effort of an oppressed people—the position in which many Americans saw themselves in 1776. Jefferson's litany of colonial grievances was an effort to establish that Americans met their burden to exercise the natural law right of revolution.

Certain scholars, such as legal historian Christian Fritz, have written that with the end of the Revolution, Americans did not renounce the right of revolution. In fact they codified it in their new constitutions and even today 35 constitutions of American states have the same or similar provisions on the right of revolution as in the preamble of the American Declaration of Independence. For instance, constitutions considered to be "conservative", such as those of post-revolutionary Massachusetts in 1780, preserved the people's right "to reform, alter, or totally change" government not only for their protection or safety but also whenever their "prosperity and happiness require[d] it". This expression was not unusual in the early American constitutions. Connecticut's 1818 constitution articulated the people's right "at all times" to alter government "in such a manner as they may think expedient".

Fritz, in American Sovereigns: The People and America's Constitutional Tradition Before the Civil War, describes a duality in American views on preconditions to the right of revolution: "Some of the first state constitutions included 'alter or abolish' provisions that mirrored the traditional right of revolution" in that they required dire preconditions to its exercise. Maryland's 1776 constitution and New Hampshire's 1784 constitution required the perversion of the ends of government and the endangering of public liberty and that all other means of redress were to no avail. But in contrast, other states dispensed with the onerous preconditions on the exercise of the right. In the 1776 Virginia constitution the right would arise simply if government was "inadequate" and Pennsylvania's 1776 constitution required only that the people considered a change to be "most conducive" to the public welfare.

== Natural law or positive law ==
Descriptions of the right of revolution also differ in whether that right is considered to be a natural law (a law whose content is set by nature and that therefore has validity everywhere) or positive law (law enacted or adopted by proper authority for governing of the state).

An example of the dual nature of the right of revolution as both a natural law and as positive law is found in the American revolutionary context. Although the American Declaration of Independence invoked the natural law right of revolution, natural law was not the sole justification for American independence. English constitutional doctrine also supported the colonists' actions, at least up to a point. By the 1760s, English law recognized what William Blackstone's Commentaries on the Laws of England called "the law of redress against public oppression". Like the natural law's right of revolution, this constitutional law of redress justified the people resisting the sovereign. This law of redress arose from a contract between the people and the king to preserve the public welfare. This original contract was "a central dogma in English and British constitutional law" since "time immemorial". The Declaration's long list of grievances declared that this bargain had been breached.

This well-accepted law of redress justified a people resisting unconstitutional acts of government. Liberty depended upon the people's "ultimate" right to resist. Unconstitutional commands breaching the "voluntary compact between the rulers and the ruled" could be "ignored" and arbitrary commands opposed with force. This right implied a duty on the part of the people to resist unconstitutional acts. As Alexander Hamilton noted in 1775, government exercised powers to protect "the absolute rights" of the people and government forfeited those powers and the people could reclaim them if government breached this constitutional contract.

The law of redress had limits like the right of revolution under natural law. The law of redress, like the right of revolution, was not an individual right. It belonged to the community as a whole, as one of the parties to the original constitutional contract. It was not a means of first resort, or response to trivial or casual errors of government. Blackstone's Commentaries suggested that using the law of redress would be "extraordinary", for example applying if the king broke the original contract, violated "the fundamental laws", or abandoned the kingdom. During the Stamp Act crisis of the 1760s the Massachusetts Provincial Congress considered resistance to the king justified if freedom came under attack from "the hand of oppression" and "the merciless feet of tyranny". A decade later the "indictment" of George III in the Declaration of Independence sought to end his sovereign reign over the colonies because he violated the original constitutional contract.

As explained in legal historian Christian Fritz's description of the role of the right of revolution in American Revolution, American independence was justified by conventional theories under Anglo-American constitutional thought at the time about the people's collective right to cast off an arbitrary king. "Both natural law and English constitutional doctrine gave the colonists a right to revolt against the sovereign's oppression." But these understandings about the right of revolution on the eve of the American Revolution rested on a traditional model of government. That model posited the existence of a hypothetical bargain struck in the mists of antiquity between a king and a people. "In this bargain, the people were protected by the monarch in exchange for the people giving the king allegiance. This was a contractual relationship. American revolutionaries accused George III of breaching his implied duty of protection under that contract, thereby releasing the people in the colonies from their allegiance. The sovereign's breach of the hypothetical contract gave rise to the subjects' right of revolution – grounded on both natural law and English constitutional doctrine."

=== Examples as positive law ===
Although many declarations of independence seek legitimacy by appealing to the right of revolution, far fewer constitutions mention this right or guarantee this right to citizens because of the destabilizing effect such a guarantee would likely produce. Among the examples of an articulation of a right of revolution as positive law include:

- The szlachta, nobles of the Polish–Lithuanian Commonwealth, maintained a right of rebellion, known as rokosz.
- The Constitutions of El Salvador have recognized "the right to insurrection" since 1886.
- New Hampshire's constitution guarantees its citizens the right to reform government, in Article 10 of the New Hampshire constitution's Bill of Rights:
  Whenever the ends of government are perverted, and public liberty manifestly endangered, and all other means of redress are ineffectual, the people may, and of right ought to reform the old, or establish a new government. The doctrine of nonresistance against arbitrary power, and oppression, is absurd, slavish, and destructive of the good and happiness of mankind.
- The Kentucky constitution guarantees a right to alter, reform or abolish their government in the Kentucky Bill of Rights:
  All power is inherent in the people, and all free governments are founded on their authority and instituted for their peace, safety, happiness and the protection of property. For the advancement of these ends, they have at all times an inalienable and indefeasible right to alter, reform or abolish their government in such manner as they may deem proper.
- Similar wording is used in Pennsylvania's constitution, under Article 1, Section 2 of the Declaration of Rights:
  All power is inherent in the people, and all free governments are founded on their authority and instituted for their peace, safety and happiness. For the advancement of these ends they have at all times an inalienable and indefeasible right to alter, reform or abolish their government in such manner as they may think proper.
- Article I, §1 of the Tennessee constitution states:
  That all power is inherent in the people, and all free governments are founded on their authority, and instituted for their peace, safety, and happiness; for the advancement of those ends they have at all times, an unalienable and indefeasible right to alter, reform, or abolish the government in such manner as they may think proper
- North Carolina's constitution of November 21, 1789 contains in its Declaration of Rights:
  3d. That Government ought to be instituted for the common benefit, protection and security of the people; and that the doctrine of non-resistance against arbitrary power and oppression is absurd, slavish, and destructive to the good and happiness of mankind.
- The Constitution of Texas contains similar wording in Article 1, Sect 2:
  All political power is inherent in the people, and all free governments are founded on their authority, and instituted for their benefit. The faith of the people of Texas stands pledged to the preservation of a republican form of government, and, subject to this limitation only, they have at all times the inalienable right to alter, reform or abolish their government in such manner as they may think expedient.
- The preface to the French Constitution of 1793 is a "Declaration of the Rights of Man and the Citizen" with several right of revolution provisions which stated in
  Article 11: Any act directed against a person, apart from the cases and without the forms determined by law, is arbitrary and tyrannical; if attempt is made to execute such act by force, the person who is the object thereof has the right to resist it by force.
  Article 12: Those who incite, dispatch, sign, or execute arbitrary acts, or cause them to be executed, are guilty and must be punished. ...
  Article 27: Let any individual who would usurp sovereignty be put to death instantly by free men.
  ...
  Articles 33–35: Resistance to oppression is the consequence of the other rights of man. There is oppression against the social body when a single one of its members is oppressed. There is oppression against every member when the social body is oppressed. When the government violates the rights of the people, insurrection is for the people, and for every portion thereof, the most sacred of rights and the most indispensable of duties.
- The 1949 Basic Law for the Federal Republic of Germany, the federal constitution, contains both entrenched, un-amendable clauses protecting human and natural rights, as well as a clause in its Article 20 (since 1968) recognizing the right of the people to resist unconstitutional tyranny, if all other measures have failed:
  All Germans shall have the right to resist any person seeking to abolish this constitutional order, if no other remedy is available.
- All Greek constitutions since the Greek Revolution have contained a right to resist in their concluding article. The current Greek Constitution states in Article 120:
  Observance of the constitution is entrusted to the patriotism of the Greeks who shall have the right and the duty to resist by all possible means against anyone who attempts the violent abolition of the Constitution.
- The Charter of Fundamental Rights and Freedoms, a part of the constitutional systems of both the Czech Republic and Slovak Republic, states in Article 23:
  Citizens have the right to resist anybody who would do away with the democratic order of human rights and fundamental freedoms, established by this Charter, if the actions of constitutional bodies or the effective use of legal means have been frustrated.
- This right is inferred in the third paragraph of the preamble to the Universal Declaration of Human Rights, which states:
  Whereas it is essential, if man is not to be compelled to have recourse, as a last resort, to rebellion against tyranny and oppression, that human rights should be protected by rule of law.

== Modern relevance ==
Some have argued that because in modern times democratic governments can be overthrown by popular vote, the right of the people to remove the government has become embedded into the political system. In a study of the idea of rule by the people in the American Revolution and in early post-revolutionary America, legal historian Christian G. Fritz writes:

The constitutional logic of recognizing the people, not a king, as the sovereign implied the irrelevance of a right of revolution in America. This did not develop instantly or uniformly after the establishment of American governments. Some of the first state constitutions included "alter or abolish" provisions that mirrored the traditional right of revolution. ... Other state constitutions adopted different versions of this right to "alter or abolish" government that did not sound like the traditional right of revolution. In these provisions, the ability of the people to revise constitutions existed regardless of the traditional preconditions for the right of revolution. ... Increasingly, as Americans included it in their constitutions, the right of revolution came to be seen as a constitutional principle permitting the people as the sovereign to control government and revise their constitutions without limit. In this way, the right broke loose from its traditional moorings of resistance to oppression. The alter or abolish provisions could now be interpreted consistent with the constitutional principle that in America, the sovereign was the people.

== See also ==
- Citizen suit
- Civil resistance
- Confederation (Poland)
- Political corruption
- Qui tam
- Regulatory capture
- Right to protest
