= University of New Mexico School of Law =

Law school in Albuquerque, New Mexico, US

Coordinates: 35.0935°N 106.6185°W

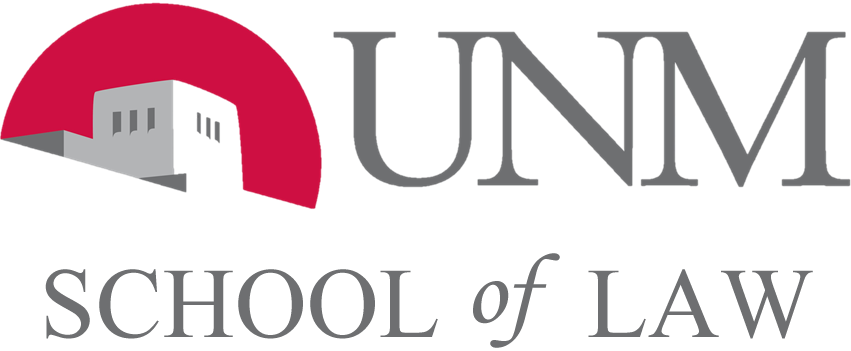
- Established: 1947
- School type: Public
- Dean: Camille Carey
- Location: Albuquerque, New Mexico, U.S.
- Enrollment: 347
- Faculty: 34 (full time)
- USNWR ranking: 107th (tie) (2025)
- Bar pass rate: 92%
- Website: lawschool.unm.edu
- ABA profile: UNM School of Law profile

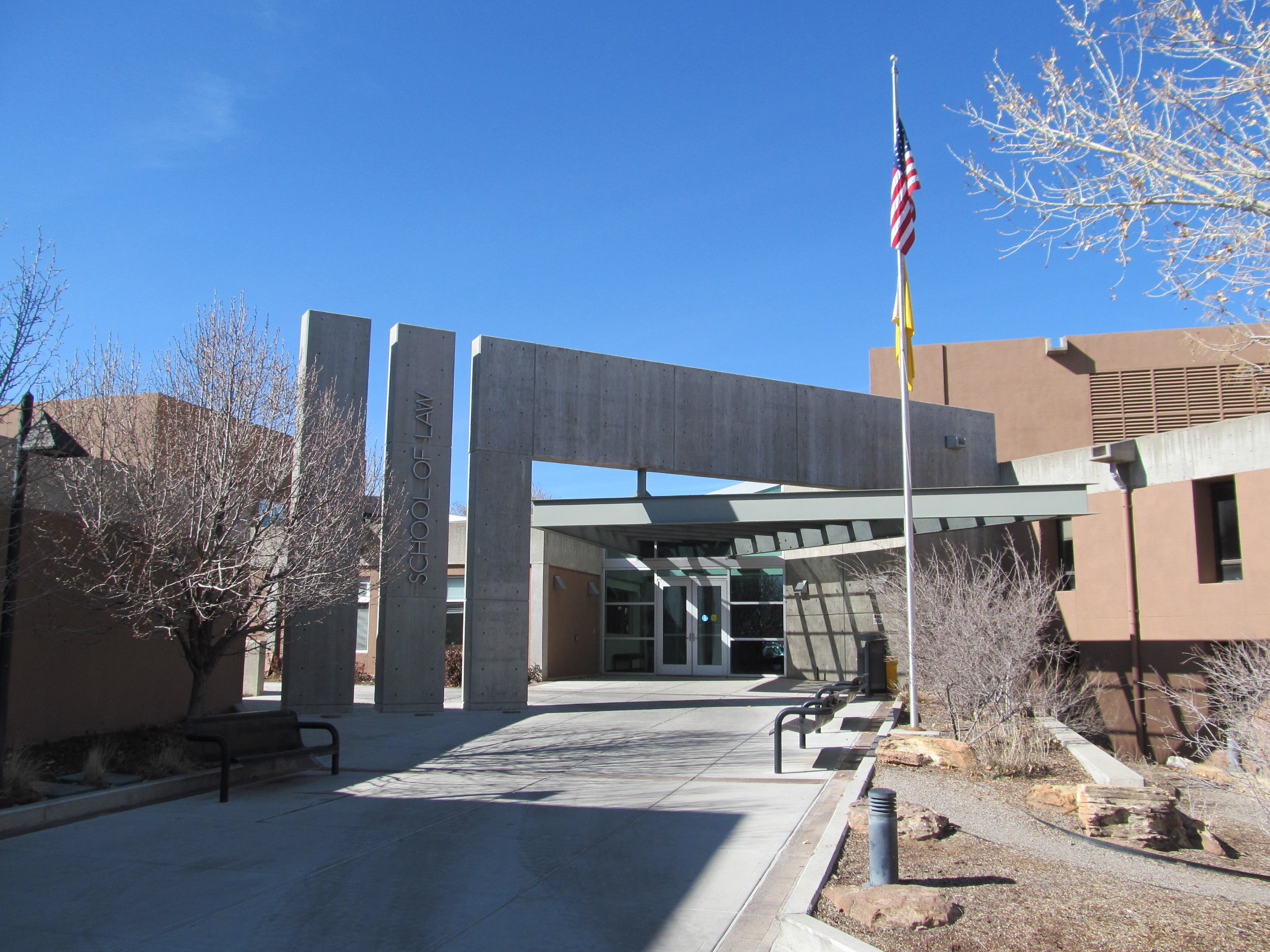
Bratton Hall

The University of New Mexico School of Law (UNM Law or New Mexico Law) is the law school of the University of New Mexico, a public research university in Albuquerque, New Mexico, United States. Founded in 1947, it is the only law school in the state.

With approximately 300 students and 32 faculty, UNM Law has a student-to-faculty ratio of 5 to 1. An average of 100 students are enrolled annually, with an acceptance rate of 44 percent. The Juris Doctor (J.D.) program is a full-time day program requiring completion of 86 credit hours in three years. The school also offers dual degree J.D./Masters programs in Accounting, Latin American Studies, Business Administration, or Public Administration; a Master of Studies in Law (MSL); and certificates in Indian law and natural resources law. UNM Law maintains five full-time legal clinics and is unique in requiring the completion of a clinical course to graduate.

UNM Law has one of the highest student diversity indexes of any U.S. law school, with Hispanics as the largest minority group. The school was among the first to prioritize the enrollment of indigenous people. According to New Mexico's official ABA-required disclosures, 85.7% of the Class of 2021 obtained full-time, long-term, J.D.-required employment ten months after graduation.

== Academics ==
In addition to standard doctrinal courses in subjects such as contracts and torts, UNM Law is known for its programs in clinical education, Indian law, and natural resources and environmental law. The in-house Clinical Law Program has been consistently recognized as among the best in the country; though clinical education is optional at most law schools, participation in the clinic is required of all UNM law students. The Indian Law Program includes a specialized program of study leading to a certificate in Indian Law, the Southwest Indian Law Clinic, and the faculty-edited Tribal Law Journal. The Natural Resources and Environmental Law Program includes a specialized program of study leading to a certificate in the field and the student-edited Natural Resources Journal.

UNM School of Law has a unique relationship with New Mexico's government. Under the terms of the state constitution, the dean of the law school is responsible for chairing the state's judicial selection process, including the Judicial Compensation Commission and serving on other boards, committees and commissions. Moreover, the School of Law has the primary responsibility for all judicial education within the state.

=== Exchange and study abroad programs ===
Study abroad opportunities are available with special UNM exchange programs in Mexico, Canada, and Tasmania. The law school also has an exchange program with the University of New Hampshire School of Law, which allows UNM students to study patent and intellectual property law at that school.

== Admissions ==
Applications are reviewed by five-member admissions committee that makes the final decision on acceptance into the next fall's entering class. The committee is composed of three full-time faculty members, the assistant dean for admissions, and one third-year law student elected by the student body. The committee begins reviewing files near the end of the fall semester; but often a final decision is not made until late April. The committee considers quantifiable factors (LSAT and grade point average) and nonquantifiable factors (letters of recommendation, personal statement, and extracurricular activities) in making decisions; substantial preference is given to New Mexico residents. The committee also recognizes that special pre-law programs for minority and disadvantaged applicants provide valuable information about an applicant's ability to succeed in law school, and participation in such programs is taken into account.

== Centers and institutes ==
- American Indian Law Center, Inc.: an independent center based at the law school that is the oldest existing Indian-controlled and operated legal and public policy organization in the country
- Madrid Summer Law Institute
- UNM Mediation Training
- UNM Institute of Public Law: a think tank devoted to the development of informed public policy and law for the state of New Mexico
- The Utton Transboundary Resources Center: a center specializing in transboundary resource disputes
- Pre-law Summer Institute: a two-month program run by the AILC at the law school that prepares American Indian and Alaska Native individuals for law school by essentially replicating the first semester of law school

== Publications ==
- Natural Resources Journal
- New Mexico Law Review
- Tribal Law Journal
- United States–Mexico Law Journal (1993–2005)

== Competitions and moot courts ==
Students may participate in the following competitions and moot courts at the law school:

- ABA Negotiation Competition
- American Intellectual Property Moot Court Competition
- Animal Law Moot Court Competition
- Environmental Moot Court Competition
- Health Law Moot Court Competition
- Hispanic National Bar Association Moot Court Competition
- Jessup International Moot Court Competition
- National Mock Trial Competition
- National Moot Court Competition
- National Native American Moot Court Competition
- National Black Law Students Thurgood Marshall Moot Court Competition

== Campus ==
In 1971, the law school moved into its current building, designed by the architect Antoine Predock while he was working for George Wright & Associates. In 2002, the law school opened the Fred Hart wing, designed by architect Edward Mazria. The New Mexico Court of Appeals is located on campus, next door to the School of Law. The Court of Appeals and the School of Law have a symbiotic relationship with the judges using the law school's library and the students using the Court of Appeal's formal courtroom. Indeed, the Court of Appeals was designed for this use, with classrooms for law students adjacent to the formal courtroom.

The Native American Community Academy, a charter school, previously had grades 11-12 attend classes at UNM Middle School. All school buses went to Wilson Middle School's campus, with grade 11-12 students transported to/from Wilson to the UNM Law building. In 2013 all grades moved to Building 232 of the former Albuquerque Indian School, the Employees' New Dormitory and Club.

== Employment ==
According to New Mexico's official ABA-required disclosures, 85.7% of the Class of 2021 obtained full-time, long-term, J.D.-required employment ten months after graduation. A slight majority of graduates (52%) were employed in law firms, followed by 16% in government and 10% in the public interest.

== Notable faculty ==
- Current
  - Christian G. Fritz
  - Nathalie Martin
  - Kevin K. Washburn
- Former
  - Norman Bay
  - Charles W. Blackwell
  - Vern Countryman
  - Cruz Reynoso
  - Suellyn Scarnecchia
