= Native American Community Academy =

K-12 school in Albuquerque, New Mexico

Coordinates: 35°06′27″N 106°39′21″W

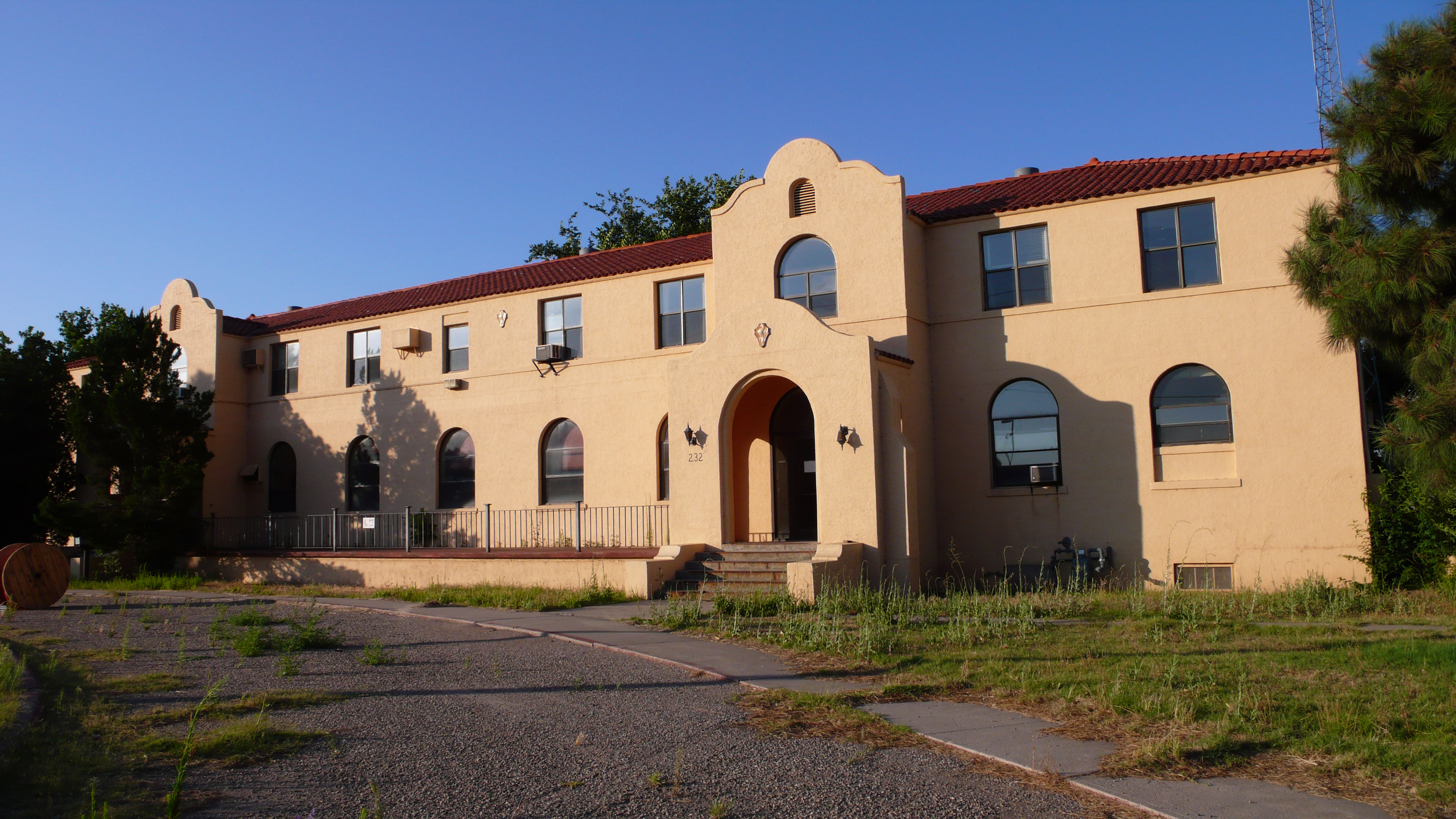
Employees' New Dormitory and Club, which houses the school

Native American Community Academy (NACA) is a charter K-12 school in Albuquerque, New Mexico, United States.

It opened in 2006. Originally it was a grade 6-12 school, with grades 6-10 taking classes at temporary buildings on the grounds of Wilson Middle School, and with grades 11-12 attending classes at University of New Mexico School of Law. All school buses went to Wilson, with grade 11-12 students transported to/from Wilson to the UNM Law building.

In 2013 all grades moved to Building 232 of the former Albuquerque Indian School, also known as the Employees' New Dormitory and Club, which was the only remaining building of the AIS campus. The prospective enrollment was 380. The school planned to add elementary grades later. The school preserved the exterior of its current campus.

On July 21, 2014, NACA started a Native American-oriented charter school network, with its first campus being Dream Diné Charter School in Shiprock, New Mexico.

== Student body ==
As of 2021 the Native American students came from over 60 different tribes. The school also takes non-Native American students.
