= Anita Bernstein =

American legal scholar

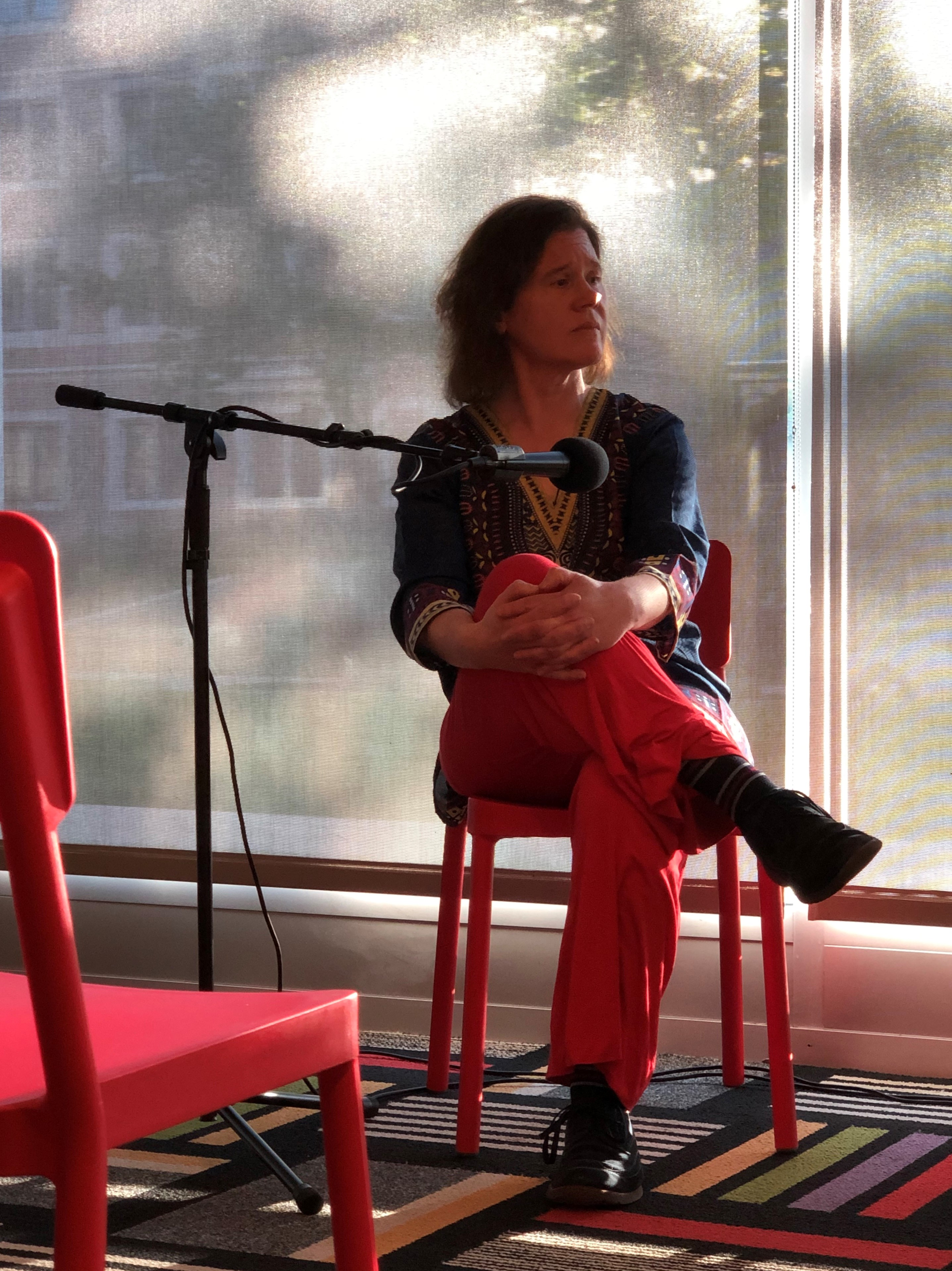
- Bernstein at the Seminary Co-op Bookstore, Chicago, May 2019
- Born: January 17, 1961 (age 65); Far Rockaway, New York, U.S.
- Education: Queens College (BA); Yale University (JD)
- Occupations: Law professor; author
- Employer: Brooklyn Law School
- Known for: Feminist Legal Theory

Anita Nancy Bernstein is an American tort law scholar with expertise in feminist jurisprudence and legal ethics. She is the Anita and Stuart Subotnick Professor of Law at Brooklyn Law School.

== Biography ==
Bernstein graduated from Queens College with a Bachelor of Arts degree in political science and then earned a Juris Doctor from Yale Law School, where she served as an article and book review editor of the Yale Law Journal.

Following law school, she clerked for Jack B. Weinstein, who was then Chief Judge of the United States District Court for the Eastern District of New York. She then worked for Debevoise & Plimpton. Bernstein was the first law professor to receive the Fulbright Scholarship in European Union affairs.

Bernstein was the first holder of an ethics chair at Emory University School of Law. She blogs occasionally on legal ethics and professional responsibility.

Bernstein is the author of two books on the law of human reproductive anatomy. The Common Law Inside the Female Body,published by Cambridge University Press, argues that traditional common law principles justify the right and liberty to refuse sexual penetration and pregnancy when those experiences are unwanted. Making the Best of Semen, published by New York University Press, argues that legal regulation of semen as a fluid would increase the safety and happiness of individuals.

== Recognition ==
Willam L. Prosser Award, Section on Torts and Compensation Systems, American Association of Law Schools (2020)
Fulbright Program Law Research Scholar (1992–93)
Jean Monnet fellow at the European University Institute (1992–93)
Associate Member of the Common Room and an Honorary Member of the Table of Christ Church College at the University of Oxford (2015).

== Notable publications ==
How Can a Product Be Liable?, 45 Duke Law Journal 1-83 (1995)
Muss Es Sein? Not Necessarily, Says Tort Law, 67 Law and Contemporary Problems 7-26 (Fall 2004)
Keep It Simple: An Explanation of the Rule of No Recovery for Pure Economic Loss, Arizona Law Review 773 (2006)
What’s Wrong with Stereotyping?, Arizona Law Review 655 (2013)
Common Law Fundamentals of the Right to Abortion, 63 Buffalo Law Review (2015)
Pitfalls Ahead: A Manifesto for the Training of Lawyers, 94 Cornell Law Review 479 (2009)
Treating Sexual Harassment with Respect, 111 Harvard Law Review 445 (1997)
The Trouble with Regulating Microfinance, 35 U. Hawai’i Law Review 1 (2013)
Whatever Happened to Law and Economics?, 64 Maryland Law Review 303 (2005)
For and Against Marriage: A Revision, 102 Michigan Law Review 129 (2003)
Toward More Parsimony and Transparency for "the Essentials of Marriage," 2011 Michigan State Law Review 83 (2011)
Real Remedies for Virtual Injuries, 90 North Carolina Law Review 1457 (2012)
Abuse and Harassment Diminish Free Speech, 35 Pace Law Review 1 (2014)

== Poetry ==
Poetry is among Bernstein's interests. Atlanta Review, Oxford Poetry, Minnesota Review, The New Renaissance, Orbis, and Bird's Thumb have published her poems. In 2016 she taught a poetry workshop at Brooklyn Lifelong Learning.
