= Employees' New Dormitory and Club =

- U.S. National Register of Historic Places
- NM State Register of Cultural Properties
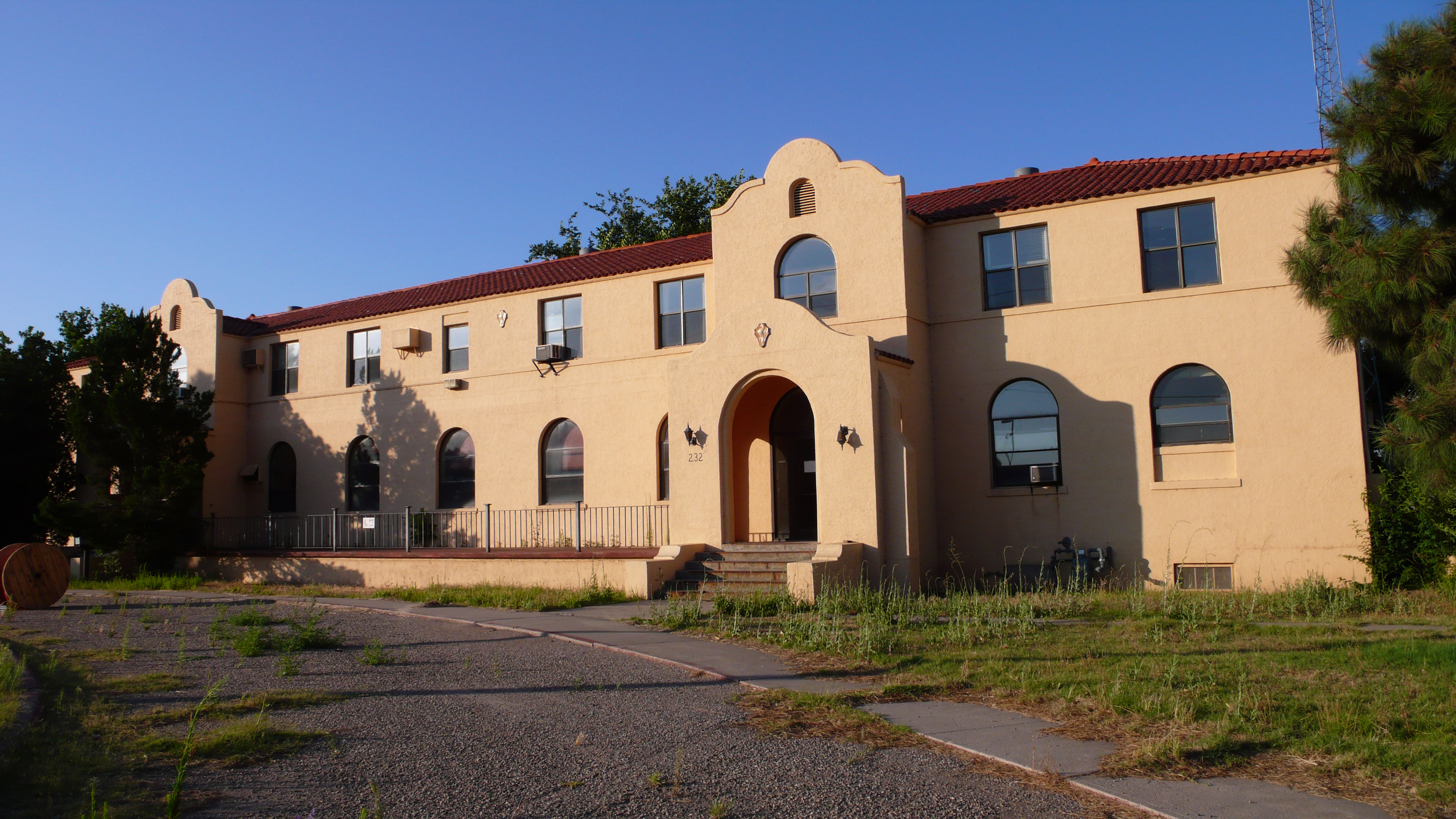
- Employees' New Dormitory, July 2006

- Location within New Mexico Location within the United States
- Location: 1000 Indian School Rd. NW, Albuquerque, New Mexico
- Coordinates: 35°06′26″N 106°39′22″W
- NRHP reference No.: 82003310
- NMSRCP No.: 843

Significant dates
- Added to NRHP: July 26, 1982
- Designated NMSRCP: October 23, 1981

The Employees' New Dormitory and Club, also known as Building 232, is a historic building in Albuquerque, New Mexico. Built in 1931, it is notable as the only surviving building of the Albuquerque Indian School, which operated at this location from 1882 to 1976. It was added to the New Mexico State Register of Cultural Properties in 1981 and the National Register of Historic Places in 1982.

== History ==
The Albuquerque Indian School was established by Presbyterian missionaries in 1881 under contract with the Department of the Interior. It moved the next year to what became its longtime campus on 12th Street. Operated for most of its existence by the Bureau of Indian Affairs (BIA), the institution was an industrial boarding school for Native American boys and girls, most of whom came from the Pueblos of New Mexico and the Navajo Nation. Under the prevailing philosophy of the time, the students were forced to assimilate into white American culture, and give up language, clothing and religion practices associated with their indigenous cultures. The schools used military-style discipline and trained the students for their primarily rural environment.

Eventually, however, this educational model fell out of favor. The Indian School struggled to maintain a sense of purpose later in the 20th century. A consortium of Pueblos and other tribal units took over the school from BIA operations in the 1970s. This was the first tribally controlled school. Rather than deal with the deteriorating buildings, they transferred remaining students in a merger into the Santa Fe Indian School in 1981. The Albuquerque campus was abandoned. All of the buildings but one were demolished in the 1980s and 1990s, following years of fires believed due to arson.

The Employees' New Dormitory (Building 232) was built in 1931 and originally housed living and dining space for school faculty members. Like the students, they lived at the campus.

After the tribal consortium closed the school and abandoned most of the campus, this building remained in use as a regional headquarters of the BIA. It continued maintenance.

In 2011, the BIA formally transferred all of the AIS property to the All Pueblo Council for redevelopment. The BIA had planned to demolish Building 232, but it was saved at the behest of the Society for the Preservation of American Indian Culture.

In 2013 the building was completely renovated by the All Pueblo Council. It now houses the Native American Community Academy, a charter school for Native Americans.

== Architecture ==
Located at the extreme southern end of the former Indian School campus, the Employees' New Dormitory is a two-story, U-shaped building with the main block facing Indian School Road and two wings extending to the rear. It is designed in the Mission Revival style with a hipped tile roof, stuccoed walls, and arched window and door openings. The street facade is symmetrical, with two main entrance porches whose gable ends are topped with ornamental curved parapets. The facade is also decorated with three decorative shield emblems, one in the center and one over each entrance. The ground floor windows are arched, while those on the second floor are smaller and rectangular. The interior layout was modified during the 2013 renovation.
