= Christian G. Fritz =

American legal historian

Christian G. Fritz is a legal historian and a law professor at the University of New Mexico School of Law. He writes on U.S. constitutional history, and his 2007 book American Sovereigns: the People and America's Constitutional Tradition Before the Civil War, published by Cambridge University Press, traces the historical roots of popular sovereignty in U.S. law.

Fritz received his B.A. degree in 1975 and his Ph.D. in history in 1986 from the University of California, Berkeley and his J.D. degree in 1978 from the University of California, Hastings College of the Law.
