= Albuquerque Indian School =

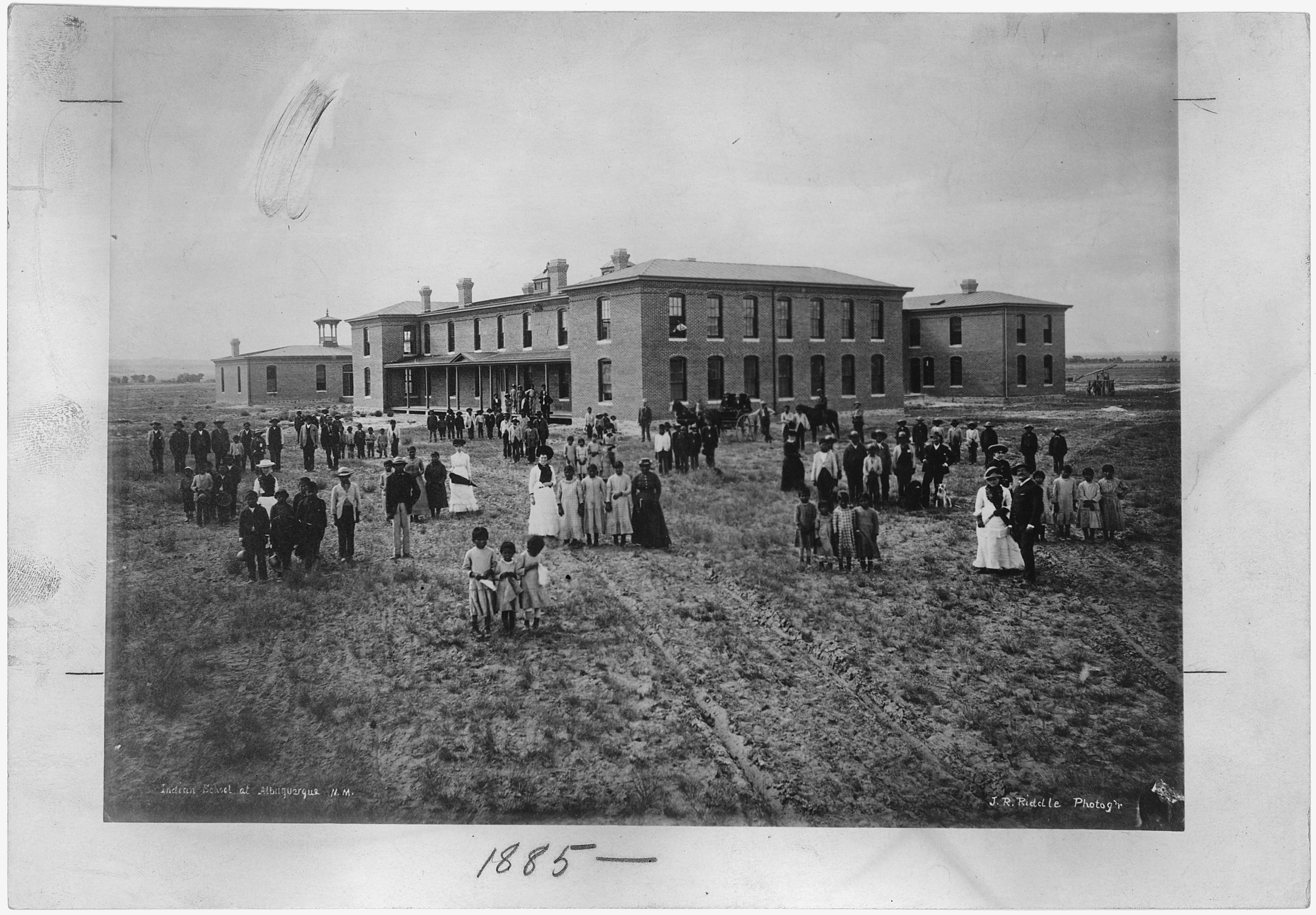
- Albuquerque Indian School in 1885

Location
- 12th St. and Indian School Rd. Albuquerque, New Mexico 87102; United States; 35°06′31″N 106°39′20″W

Information
- Type: Native American boarding school
- Established: 1881
- Closed: 1981
- Campus type: Suburban
- Colors: Orange and Black
- Mascot: Braves

Albuquerque Indian School (AIS) was a Native American boarding school in Albuquerque, New Mexico, which operated from 1881 to 1981. It was one of the oldest and largest off-reservation boarding schools in the United States. For most of its history it was run by the Bureau of Indian Affairs (BIA). Like other government boarding schools, AIS was modeled after the Carlisle Indian Industrial School, using military-style discipline to assimilate native students into white American culture. The curriculum focused on literacy and vocational skills, with field work components on farms or railroads for boys and as domestic help for girls.

In the 1930s, as the philosophy around Indian education changed, the school shifted away from the military approach. It offered more training in traditional indigenous crafts such as pottery, weaving, and silversmithing.

In 1977, administration of the school was taken over by the All Indian Pueblo Council, a coalition of the 20 Pueblos in New Mexico and Texas. By this point the campus was in disrepair, and it closed soon afterward. Most of the abandoned school buildings burned down and were razed between 1981 and 1993. As of 2022 the sole remaining building is the Employees' New Dormitory and Club.

== History ==
The school opened in 1881 in an adobe hacienda in Duranes, a village just north of Albuquerque which was later absorbed by the city. It was operated by the Presbyterian Board of Home Missions under contract to the Department of the Interior and had an initial enrollment of 40.

In 1882, the school moved to its permanent site at 12th Street and Indian School Road. The 66-acre site was donated for this purpose by city businessmen. By 1884, the enrollment was 158.

The BIA took over direct operation in 1886. Over the years, more buildings were added to the campus to keep up with expanding enrollment. In 1925, the school added upper grades and a high school curriculum to the primary grades. Enrollment peaked at about 1,400 students in the 1930s.

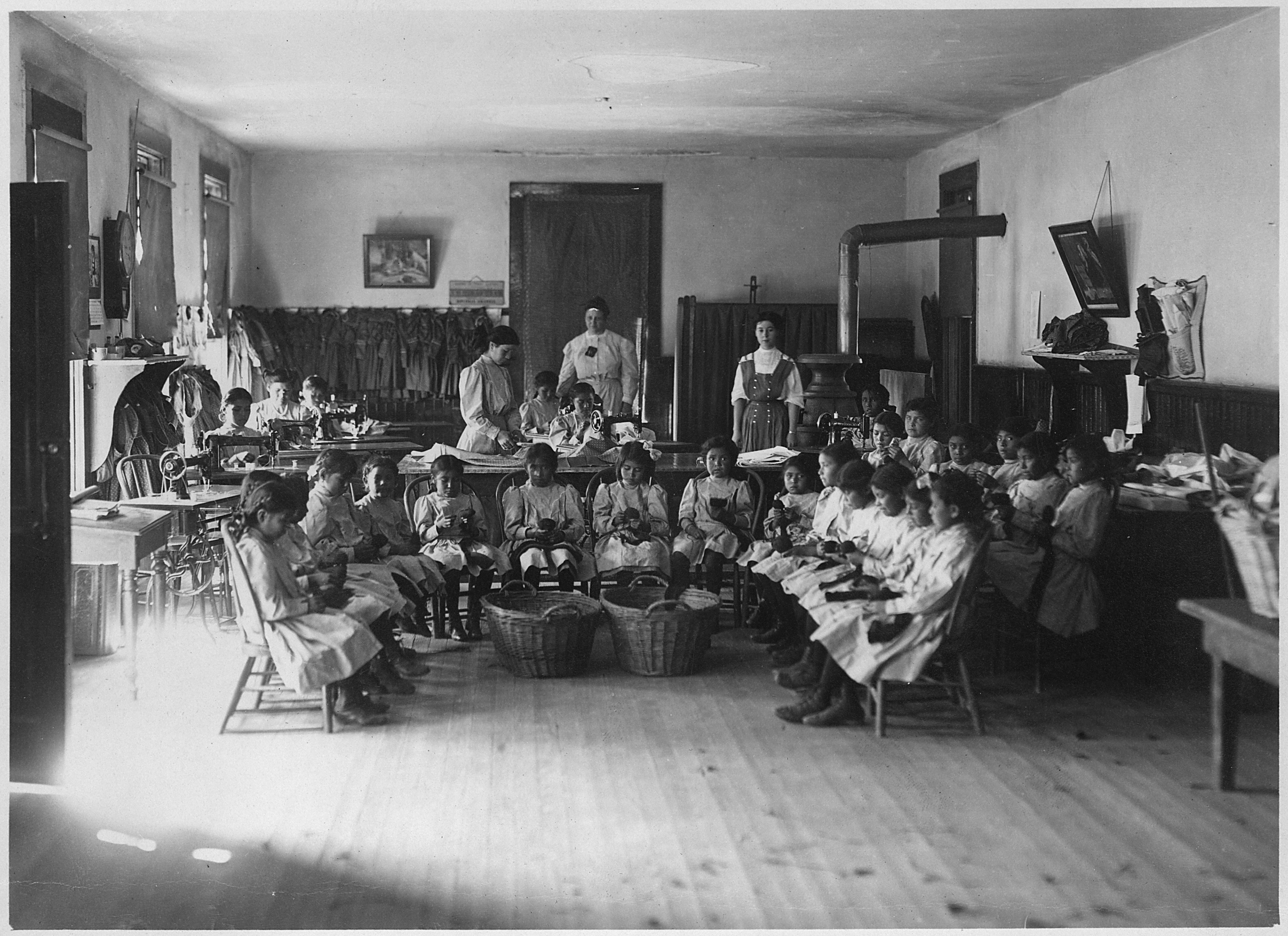
Girls in a sewing class at AIS, circa 1910

After passage of the 1953 Indian Termination Act, enrollment declined. More students enrolled in on- or near reservation public schools, as the federal government decreased separate programs for Native Americans. Congress believed that some tribal nations no longer needed separate status, but the legislation produced numerous adverse outcomes.

Following activism among tribal nations, with a renewed emphasis on sovereignty, and passage of the Indian Self-Determination Act of 1975, the All Indian Pueblo Council (AIPC) was formed from a coalition of the 20 Pueblos in New Mexico and Texas. They requested and were awarded a contract with the BIA to operate the school starting in the 1977–78 school year. AIS was the first BIA school to be transferred to local tribal control. By this point the campus buildings were in poor condition because of years of deferred maintenance. The AIPC began advocating to move its students to the Santa Fe Indian School instead of taking on expensive renovation of this campus. The BIA agreed to the move after 22 students had to be treated in early 1981 for carbon monoxide poisoning due to a faulty furnace. The merger into Santa Fe Indian School was completed later in the year. AIS ceased to exist as an independent entity.

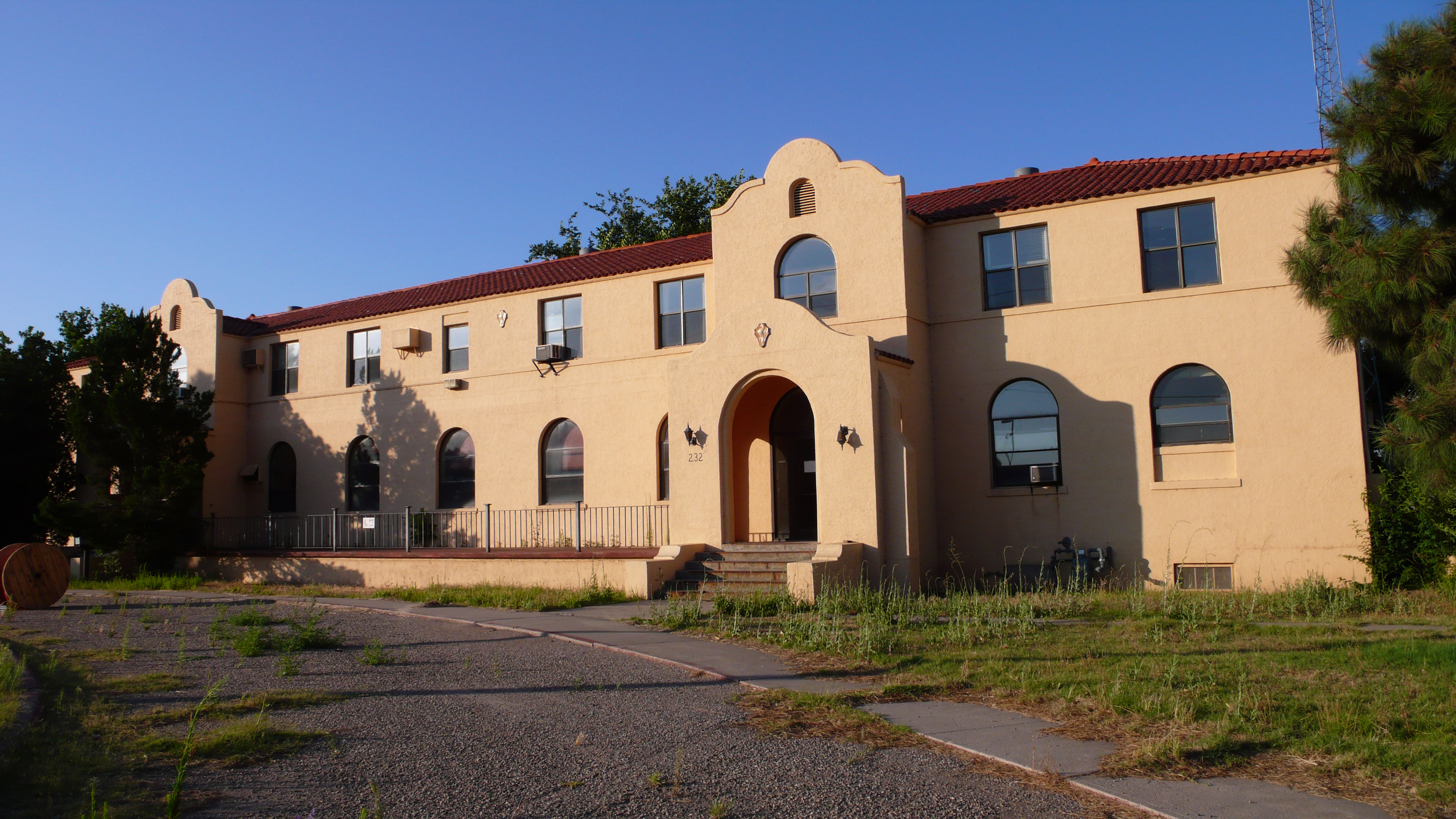
Employees' New Dormitory and Club, the sole remaining building

=== Post-closure ===
After the school closed, the campus was abandoned. In 1984, the BIA transferred the property to the AIPC, which still owned it as of 2002. Between 1981 and 1993, nearly all of the school buildings were destroyed by a series of fires. At least 29 separate fires occurred, with 16 in 1987 alone. Most of the fires were suspected to have been a result of arson. When the last school building was burning down in 1993, witnesses saw six men leaving the scene.

The only building to survive was Building 232, the Employees' New Dormitory and Club, which was across the street from the main part of the campus. For several years it was used by BIA for its regional headquarters.

After the entire AIS site was transferred to the AIPC, this building was renovated in 2013 to house the Native American Community Academy, a charter school.

In 2009 the city government and the Indian Pueblos Federal Development Corporation created an agreement on possible development of the AIS site.

A plaque had been installed in concrete at the site that commemorated a cemetery for Native American children who died from 1882-1933. In 2021 the plaque disappeared.

In July 2021, The Paper reported on the rediscovery of the cemetery and unmarked graves for the Albuquerque Indian School. Reporter Jonathan Sims (Acoma Pueblo) had undertaken an investigation after learning about recent discoveries of multiple mass graves associated with historical sites of Indian residential schools in Canada.

4-H Park, across the street from where the Indian Pueblo Cultural CentW2 er is now located, used to have a plaque noting that this park had previously been a burial site for Zuni, Navajo, and Apache students of the school. The graves were unmarked. Ed Tsyitee, a groundskeeper employed by the school, had maintained this cemetery until his retirement in 1964.

In a 2021 article, Sims "claimed the city and AIS agreed to seed and plant trees in the area in order not to draw attention to the site." The Paper's report also cites an article published in the Albuquerque Journal on October 6, 1973. This 1973 article says that workers installing a sprinkler system had uncovered human remains while working in the park.

== Campus ==
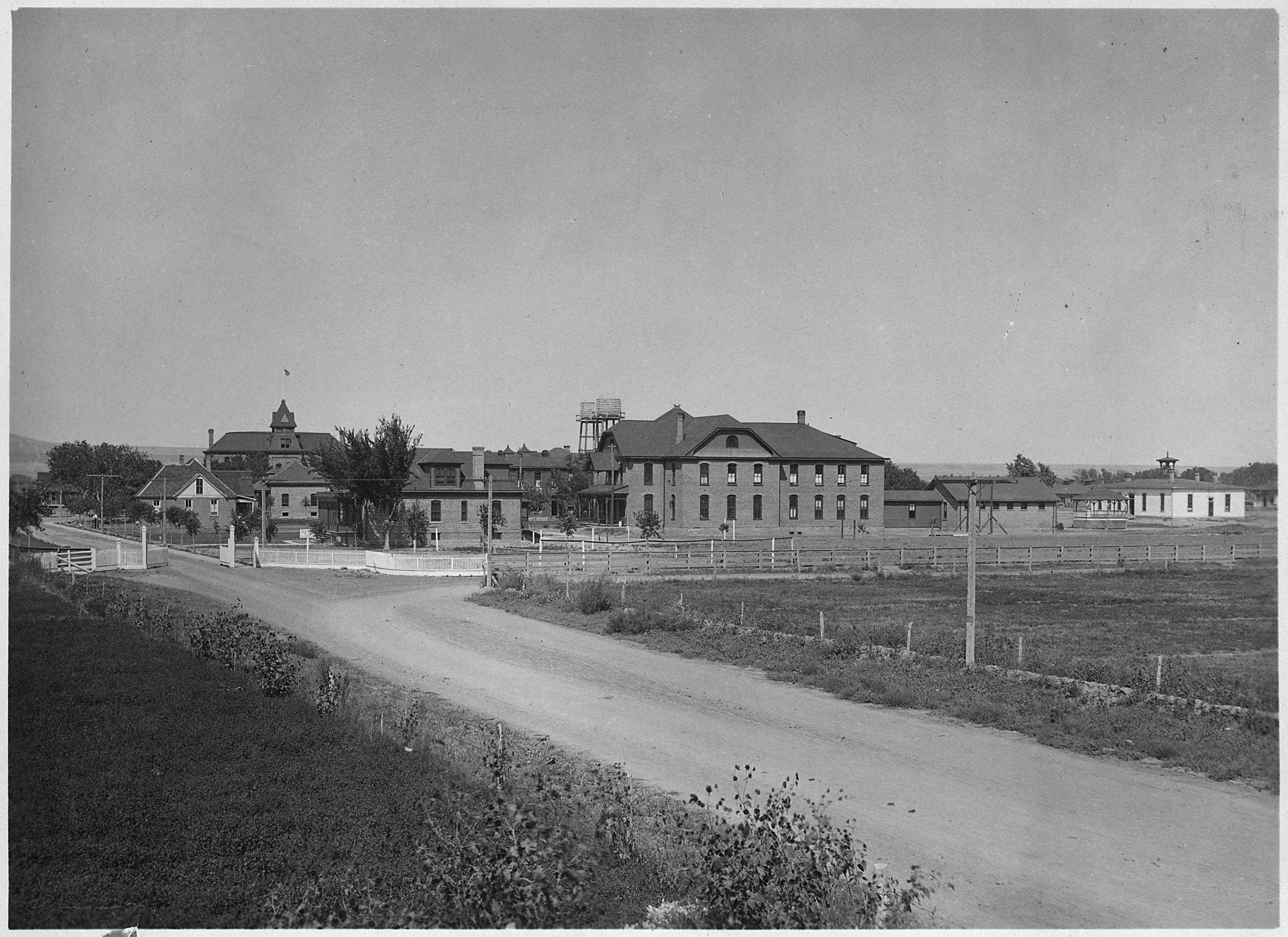
Albuquerque Indian School campus circa 1910

The AIS campus occupied a 45-acre (18 ha) site near 12th Street and Indian School Road in the Near North Valley neighborhood. At the time the school closed, it comprised 44 buildings.

Three of the school buildings were listed on the National Register of Historic Places:

- Employees' New Dormitory and Club (Building 232), built in 1931
- Gymnasium-Auditorium Building (Building 210), built in 1923
- University of New Mexico Lodge (Building 219), built in 1917

The latter two buildings burned down and were removed from the register.

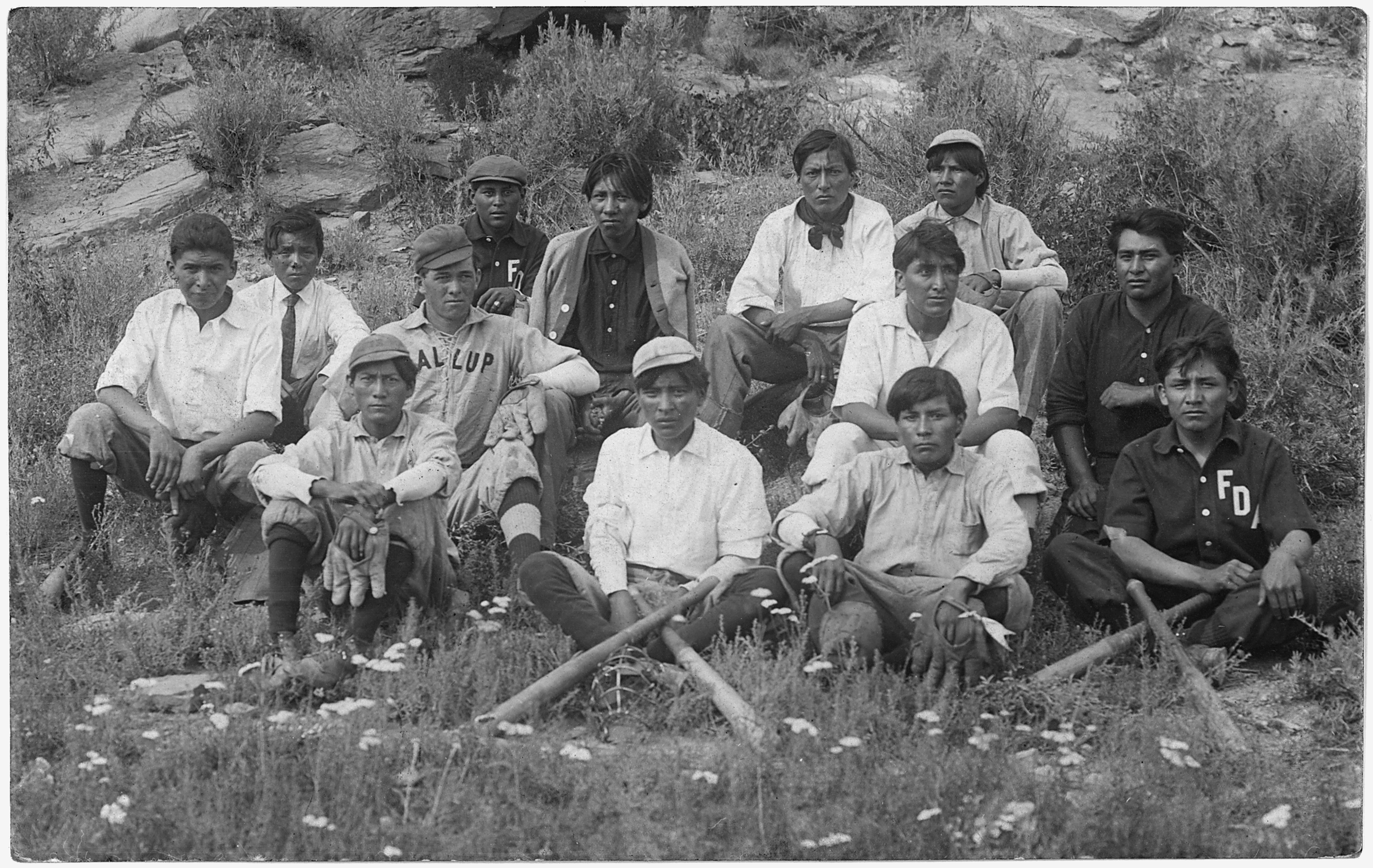
Baseball team at AIS, 1911

== Student body ==
Most AIS students came from the Pueblos and the Navajo Nation. In 1887, the student body was 77% Pueblo, 5% Navajo, and 18% from other groups including Mescalero Apache, Tohono Oʼodham, and Pima. By 1904 the makeup was 61% Pueblo, 36% Navajo, 2% Apache, and 1% from other groups. Starting in the 1950s, the number of Pueblo students sharply decreased as these students began attending on-reservation day schools instead. In 1960, the school's population of around 1,000 students was 87% Navajo and only 12% Pueblo.

In 1968, 12 Native Americans from the Ramah, New Mexico area went to Albuquerque Indian School.

== Sports ==
AIS competed in the New Mexico Activities Association. The school won state championships in baseball (1941 and 1976), boys' basketball (1928), and boys' track and field (1928).

The 1928 basketball team compiled a 26–1 record to earn the state title and traveled to Chicago to compete in the national championship tournament hosted by the University of Chicago. However, the team lost both of their games in the tournament.
