= Suellyn Scarnecchia =

American legal scholar

Suellyn Scarnecchia is a clinical law professor at the University of Michigan. She previously served as the general counsel and vice president at the University of Michigan from 2008 to 2012. From 2003 to 2008 she was the dean of the University of New Mexico School of Law, the first woman to fill that position.

== Education and practice ==
Scarnecchia received her bachelor's degree from Northwestern University and her J.D. degree from the University of Michigan Law School. After graduation, Scarnecchia spent six years focusing on employment law at the Battle Creek, Michigan law firm of McCroskey, Feldman, Cochrane & Brock.

== Career at the University of Michigan ==
After private practice and prior to coming to UNM, Scarnecchia returned to the University of Michigan Law School, where she was a member of the faculty and Associate Dean for Clinical Affairs and taught in the Child Advocacy Law Clinic.

For 12 years, she worked in the University of Michigan Child Advocacy Law Clinic, concentrating on civil child abuse and neglect. One of the cases that came into the clinic involved Jan and Roberta DeBoer, an Ann Arbor couple who were trying to adopt a child known as Baby Jessica. The case attracted national attention because the baby's biological parents sought the return of the 2-year-old girl. After a long court battle, the Michigan Supreme Court ordered the DeBoers to return the child to her parents in Iowa. Ever since, Scarnecchia has occasionally provided advocacy in similar cases across the country.

Additional courses she taught at Michigan included Women and the Law Clinic, Civil Clinic, Child Abuse and Neglect Interdisciplinary Seminar, Negotiation, Access to Justice and Family Law.

At Michigan, Scarnecchia suggested a position be created to oversee all of the clinics at that law school. The school's administrators agreed, and she became the first person to serve as clinic coordinator, a position she held for two years before being named Associate Dean for Clinical Affairs. Scarnecchia received the additional title of Associate Dean for Law School Administration for two years. Her management interests spread to the central university where, for eight months in 2002, she worked on special assignment to the provost's office, handling the duties of assistant provost for academic and faculty affairs.

Scarnecchia has served on the board of directors of the Clinical Legal Education Association and was a panelist on the Michigan Attorney Disciplinary Board until she moved to New Mexico. She was a technical adviser on the Michigan Supreme Court Task Forces on Gender and Race Bias in the Courts and was board president of the Battle Creek Area Organization Against Domestic Violence, which she helped establish. Scarnecchia is a past president of the Women Lawyers Association of Michigan.

== Deanship at the University of New Mexico School of Law ==
At the University of New Mexico School of Law, Scarnecchia succeeded a long line of distinguished deans at the school. These former deans include Vern Countryman, an avid civil rights activist who later retired as a Harvard law professor, as well as Frederick Hart (still on the faculty), who in the early 70s made it his mission to hire more women and minority faculty, to give clinical law professors full tenure status, and to start a program that led the number of Native American attorneys nationwide to grow from 300 to 4,000.

Controversy has attended Dean Scarnecchia's tenure at the law school, culminating in an editorial in the Albuquerque Journal by Christina Hoff Sommers in October, 2006. The editorial reported that while the students at the University of New Mexico law school are politically diverse, the faculty contains no conservative or Republican voices whatsoever. Furthermore, the editorial alleges, students who do not share the law faculty's political complexion frequently find themselves isolated and marginalized by the law faculty—who, for example, explicitly discourage students from joining the Federalist Society. Dean Scarnecchia, the editorial implied, played an important role in a recent decision wherein the faculty dissolved the "DA Law Clinic", which allowed students to work with the District Attorney's Office. According to the editorial, many law faculty were so extreme in their political radicalism that they were not comfortable allowing their students to work prosecuting criminals.

At the law school, Dean Scarnecchia presided over a student body of human rights advocates and athletes, environmentalists, those interested in Indian Law, natural resources advocates, and those interested in business law, particularly with respect to small businesses.

== Public Service in New Mexico ==
While dean at the law school, Scarnecchia served as a board member for the UNM Science and Technology Corporation. She chaired all Judicial Selection Commissions in New Mexico, a role that the dean of the law school is given by the New Mexico Constitution. Dean Scarnecchia served on the New Mexico Supreme Court Task Forces on Professionalism and Access to Justice. She was a member of the ABA New Deans Workshop Committee, the Association of American Law Schools' Resource Corps and Committee on Recruitment and Retention of Minority Faculty, and the Law School Admissions Council's Minority Affairs Committee.

The Governor of New Mexico also appointed Scarnecchia to serve on several state commissions. As one example, Scarnecchia served in 2006 as co-chair of the "Governor's Task Force on Ethics Reform," which conducted public hearings and authored a report detailing a "comprehensive approach to reforming New Mexico's ethics and campaign finance laws.".

== Awards ==
In 2019 Scarnecchia was awarded the John W. Reed Michigan Lawyer Legacy Award by the State Bar of Michigan. The award goes to "an educator whose influence on lawyers has elevated the quality of legal practice in our state."
