= Nathalie Martin =

Nathalie Martin is the Frederick M. Hart Chair in Consumer and Clinical Law at the University of New Mexico School of Law. She joined the UNM law faculty in 1998. She received a B.A. in 1983 from St. Olaf College, a J.D. in 1986 from Syracuse University and an L.L.M. in 1998 from Temple University.

She is a member of the American Law Institute and the American College of Bankruptcy, a fellow of the American College of Consumer Financial Services Lawyers, a former resident scholar at the American Bankruptcy Institute⁣⁣, and a former dean of faculty of the American Board of Certification, which writes the tests used to certify bankruptcy attorneys.

Her research focuses on elder law, as well as various consumer law topics. She studies high cost loans like payday, title, and installment loan products with triple digit interest rates. Her most recent study examines continuing-care or life care contracts. She also does empirical research into consumer attitudes toward credit, and consumer knowledge of various credit products, and in the credit habits of undocumented persons. Her projects include several empirical studies funded by the National Conference of Bankruptcy Judges, including one that funded curbside interviews of payday loan customers.

She runs the Financial Literacy Program at UNM School of Law, promoting financial literacy in New Mexico high schools, and teaches a two-day Financial Literacy Course for law students and undergraduates.

Martin is also a yoga and mindfulness meditation teacher. She is the author of several books, including “The Inspired Retirement: Purpose and Passion in Your Next Adventure,” "Yoga for Lawyers: Mind-Body Connections to Feel Better All the Time" and "Lawyering from the Inside Out: Learning Professional Development through Mindfulness and Emotional Intelligence." Her work has been cited by the New Mexico Supreme Court, the California Supreme Court, and the United States Supreme Court.
