= List of justices of the New Mexico Supreme Court =

Following is a list of justices of the New Mexico Supreme Court:

== Current justices ==
Justice	Born	Political party	Tenure began	Term ends (Note: Terms end on December 31.)	Chief	Appointing governor	Law school
C. Shannon Bacon, Chief Justice	1971 or 1972 (age 53–54)	Democratic	February 4, 2019	2026	2022–2024	Michelle Lujan Grisham (D)	Creighton
Michael E. Vigil	May 23, 1951 (age 74)	Democratic	January 1, 2019	2025	2020–2022	n/a	Georgetown
David K. Thomson	1968 or 1969 (age 56–57)	Democratic	February 4, 2019	2026	2024-Present	Michelle Lujan Grisham (D)	Denver
Julie J. Vargas	1968 or 1969 (age 56–57)	Democratic	January 25, 2021	2028	—	Michelle Lujan Grisham (D)	New Mexico
Briana Zamora	1973 or 1974 (age 51–52)	Democratic	August 9, 2021	2030	–	Michelle Lujan Grisham (D)	New Mexico

Source: Court Information & History.

== Former justices ==
Justice	Began service	Ended service	Notes
Joseph F. Baca	January 1, 1989	July 31, 2002	
Richmond P. Barnes	September 25, 1922	November 7, 1922	Defeated for reelection.
Howard L. Bickley	January 1, 1925	March 4, 1947	Died in office.
Richard C. Bosson	January 1, 2003	October 30, 2015	Retired.
Clarence M. Botts	December 26, 1922	December 31, 1924	Not nominated for reelection.
Sam G. Bratton	January 1, 1923	September 16, 1924	Resigned.
Charles R. Brice	January 1, 1935	December 31, 1950	Retired.
David W. Carmody	January 1, 1959	April 30, 1969	Retired.
Charles C. Catron	March 15, 1929	December 31, 1930	Not nominated for reelection.
David Chávez	January 11, 1960	December 31, 1968	Retired.
Edward L. Chávez	March 7, 2003	March 9, 2018	Appointed by Governor Richardson January 1, 2003 (sworn in March 7) to complete Gene E. Franchini's term ending December 31, 2006; elected in 2004; won retention in 2006; won retention in 2014. Retired March 2018.
Gary L. Clingman	April 30, 2018	December 28, 2018	Defeated for election
James C. Compton	April 1, 1947	December 31, 1972	Retired after he lost his 1972 primary election.
Henry G. Coors	January 1, 1951	July 8, 1953	Retired.
Charles W. Daniels	January 1, 2007	December 31, 2018	Retired.
Stephen B. Davis Jr.	November 1, 1921	September 25, 1922	Resigned.
Mack Easley	July 1, 1976	September 30, 1982	Retired.
William R. Federici	April 15, 1977	December 31, 1986	Retired.
Edwin L. Felter	August 16, 1979	December 31, 1980	Retired.
Tomlinson Fort	September 19, 1924	December 31, 1924	Not nominated for reelection.
Gene E. Franchini	November 30, 1990	December 31, 2002	Term ended.
Stanley F. Frost	November 8, 1991	May 31, 1996	Retired.
Richard H. Hanna	January 10, 1912	November 7, 1918	Defeated for reelection.
Andrew H. Hudspeth	January 1, 1931; April 1, 1946	December 31, 1938; December 31, 1946	Not nominated for reelection. Term ended.
Paul J. Kennedy	September 13, 2002	December 20, 2002	Resigned.
Henry A. Kiker	December 16, 1954	March 25, 1958	Died.
Charles B. Larrabee	July 11, 1989	November 7, 1989	Resigned.
Eugene D. Lujan	January 1, 1945	December 31, 1959	Retired.
Thomas J. Mabry	January 1, 1939	March 28, 1946	Resigned.
Petra Jimenez Maes	January 1, 1998	December 31, 2018	Retired.
Joe L. Martínez	January 1, 1973	July 23, 1975	Resigned.
James C. McGhee	January 1, 1947	August 1, 1960	Retired.
Thomas F. McKenna	April 6, 1970	December 31, 1970	Defeated in primary.
Dan A. McKinnon III	July 15, 1996; April 21, 1997	December 6, 1996; December 6, 1998	Resigned after defeat for reelection. Resigned after failing to be renominated in primary.
John B. McManus Jr.	January 1, 1971	July 6, 1979	Died in office.
Pamela B. Minzner	December 2, 1994	August 31, 2007	Died in office.
Irwin S. Moise	May 16, 1959	March 31, 1970	Retired.
Seth D. Montgomery	September 5, 1989	October 27, 1994	Resigned.
Samuel Z. Montoya	July 1, 1971	December 31, 1976	Retired.
Judith Nakamura	December 11, 2015	December 1, 2020	Retired.
Tom W. Neal	November 15, 1932	December 31, 1932	Served brief appointment.
Merrill E. Noble	August 1, 1960	November 13, 1969	Died in office.
LaFel E. Oman	January 1, 1971	March 31, 1977	Retired.
Frank W. Parker	January 10, 1912	August 3, 1932	Died in office.
H. Vern Payne	January 1, 1977	December 1, 1983	Retired.
Richard E. Ransom	January 1, 1987	February 7, 1997	Retired.
Herbert F. Raynolds	January 1, 1919	December 26, 1922	Resigned.
William F. Riordan	January 1, 1981	December 31, 1986	Term ended.
Clarence J. Roberts	January 10, 1912	January 21, 1921	Resigned.
Daniel K. Sadler	January 1, 1931	May 15, 1959	Retired.
Tony Scarborough	January 1, 1987	July 5, 1989	Resigned.
Patricio M. Serna	December 5, 1996	August 31, 2012	Retired.
Augustus T. Seymour	July 8, 1953	December 15, 1954	Retired after defeat for reelection.
W. Morris Shillinglaw	April 7, 1958	January 1, 1959	Defeated.
John F. Simms Sr.	March 15, 1929	December 31, 1930	Not nominated for reelection.
Daniel A. Sisk	January 5, 1970	December 31, 1970	Defeated in primary.
Dan Sosa Jr.	July 22, 1975	September 30, 1991	Retired.
Donnan Stephenson	January 1, 1971	June 30, 1976	Retired.
Harry E. Stowers Jr.	December 3, 1982	May 31, 1989	Retired.
Paul Tackett	January 1, 1969	January 30, 1971	Retired.
Martin A. Threet	June 1, 1943	July 15, 1944	Resigned.
Barbara J. Vigil	November 6, 2012	June 30, 2021	Retired.
Mary Coon Walters	January 13, 1984	December 31, 1988	Retired.
John C. Watson	January 1, 1925	December 31, 1934	Defeated for reelection; ran again unsuccessfully in 1936.
John T. Watson	May 29, 1969	December 31, 1970	Defeated in primary.
Kenneth B. Wilson	December 29, 1989	November 30, 1990	Resigned after defeat for reelection.
A. L. Zinn	January 1, 1933	May 31, 1943	Resigned.

== Territorial justices ==
The Territory New Mexico was initially divided into three judicial districts, with additional districts added over time.

Justice	Began service	Ended service	Notes
Joab Houghton	1846; 1865	1851; 1869	First District; Third District
Grafton Baker	1851	1853	First District
James J. Deavenport	1853	1858	First District
Kirby Benedict	1853; 1858	1858; 1866	Third District; First District
John P. Slough	1866	1868	First District
John Sebrie Watts	1851; 1868	1857; 1869	Second District; First District
Joseph G. Palen	1869	1876	First District
Henry L. Waldo	1876	1878	First District
Charles McCandless	1878	1879	First District
L. Bradford Prince	1879	1882	First District
Samuel Beach Axtell	1882	1885	First District
Reuben A. Reeves	1887	1889	First District
William H. Whiteman	1889	1890	First District
Edward P. Seeds	1890	1894	First District
Napoleon B. Laughlin	1894	1898	First District
John R. McFie	1898; 1889	1889; 1893	First District; Third District
Antonio Jose Otero	1846	1851	Second District
Perry E. Brocchus	1857; 1867	1859; 1869	Second District
W. F. Boon	1859	1861	Second District
Sydney A. Hubbell	1861	1867	Second District
Hezekiah Johnson	1870	1876	Second District
John I. Reddick	1876	1877	Second District
Samuel B. McLin	1877	1878	Second District
Samuel C. Parks	1878	1882	Second District
Joseph Bell	1882	1885	Second District
William H. Brinker	1885	1889	Second District
William D. Lee	1889	1893	Second District
Needham C. Collier	1893	1898	Second District
Jonathan W. Crumpacker	1898	1902	Second District
Benjamin S. Baker	1902	1904	Second District
Ira A. Abbott	1904	1912	Second District
Charles H. Beaubien	1846	1851	Third District
Horace Mower	1851	1853	Third District
William G. Blackwood	1858	1861	Third District
Joseph G. Knapp	1861	1865	Third District
Abram Bergen	1869	1870	Third District
Benjamin J. Waters	1870	1871	Third District
Daniel B. Johnson	1871	1872	Third District
Warren Bristol	1872	1884	Third District
Stephen Fowler Wilson	1884	1885	Third District
William F. Henderson	1885	1889	Third District
Albert B. Fall	1893	1895	Third District
Gideon D. Bantz	1895	1898	Third District
Frank W. Parker	1898	1912	Third District
Elisha V. Long	1889	1893	Fourth District
James O'Brien	1893	1893	Fourth District
Thomas J. Smith	1893	1898	Fourth District
William J. Mills	1898	1910	Fourth District
Clarence J. Roberts	1910	1912	Fourth District
Alfred A. Freeman	1890	1895	Fifth District
Humphrey B. Hamilton	1895	1898	Fifth District
Charles A. Leland	1898	1900	Fifth District
Daniel H. McMillan	1900	1903	Fifth District
William Hayes Pope	1903	1912	Fifth District
Edward A. Mann	1904	1909	Sixth District
Alford W. Cooley	1909	1910	Sixth District
Edward R. Wright	1910	1912	Sixth District
Merritt C. Mechem	1909	1912	Seventh District
