= 2016 New Mexico elections =

- November 8, 2016

A general election was held in the U.S. state of New Mexico on November 8, 2016. In the presidential election, voters in the state chose five electors to represent them in the Electoral College via popular vote. All three New Mexico seats to the United States House of Representatives were up for election. A special election was held for Secretary of State, along with all seats in both houses of the New Mexico Legislature. Primary elections were held on June 7.

== Federal elections ==
=== U.S. President ===
2016 United States presidential election in New Mexico
Party	Candidate	Votes	%	±%
Democratic	Hillary Clinton	385,234	48.26	▼4.73
Republican	Donald Trump	319,667	40.04	▼2.80
Libertarian	Gary Johnson	74,541	9.34	▲5.79
Green	Jill Stein	9,879	1.24	▲0.90
Independent	Evan McMullin	5,825	0.73	
Constitution	Darrell Castle	1,514	0.15	▲0.02
Socialism and Liberation	Gloria La Riva	1,184	0.15	
American Delta	Rocky De La Fuente	475	0.06	
Majority		65,567	8.21	▼1.94
Total votes		798,319	100.00	

=== U.S. House of Representatives ===
All three incumbents were reelected: Democrat Michelle Lujan Grisham of the 1st district, Republican Steve Pearce of the 2nd district, and Democrat Ben Ray Luján of the 3rd district.

== State elections ==
=== Secretary of State (special election) ===
2016 New Mexico Secretary of State special election
- November 8, 2016
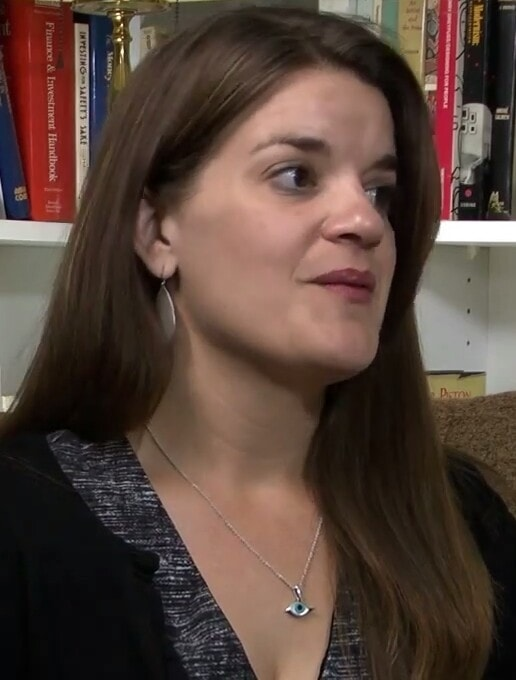

Nominee	Maggie Toulouse Oliver	Nora Espinoza
Party	Democratic	Republican
Popular vote	433,227	334,733
Percentage	56.4%	43.6%
- Toulouse Oliver: 50–60% 60–70% 70–80% Espinoza: 50–60% 60–70% 70–80%
Secretary of State before election
Brad Winter
Republican
Elected Secretary of State
Maggie Toulouse Oliver
Democratic

On October 22, 2015, incumbent Secretary of State Dianna Duran resigned amid a corruption and campaign law investigation. Democrat Maggie Toulouse Oliver, who ran against Duran in 2014, defeated Republican Nora Espinoza to fill the remainder of her term.

==== Republican primary ====
Republican Brad Winter, who was appointed by Governor Susana Martinez following Duran's resignation, chose not to run for a full term. Because of this, state representative Nora Espinoza ran unopposed in the primary election.

Republican primary results
Party	Candidate	Votes	%
Republican	Nora Espinoza	83,759	100.0%
Total votes		83,759	100.0%

==== Democratic primary ====
Bernalillo County clerk Maggie Toulouse Oliver was the only Democrat to declare her candidacy, and ran unopposed in the primary election.

Democratic primary results
Party	Candidate	Votes	%
Democratic	Maggie Toulouse Oliver	172,837	100.0%
Total votes		172,837	100.0%

==== General election ====
2016 New Mexico Secretary of State special election
Party	Candidate	Votes	%	±%
Democratic	Maggie Toulouse Oliver	433,227	56.41%	+8.05%
Republican	Nora Espinoza	334,733	43.59%	−8.05%
Total votes		767,960	100.0%	
Democratic gain from Republican				

=== New Mexico Legislature ===
All seats of the New Mexico Legislature were up for election in 2016. The New Mexico Senate has 42 members elected to four-year terms, while the New Mexico House of Representatives has 70 members elected to two-year terms.

Senate

Party	Before	Won	+/-
Democratic	24	26	▲2
Republican	18	16	▼2
Total	42	42	

House of Representatives

Party	Before	Won	+/-
Democratic	33	38	▲5
Republican	37	32	▼5
Total	70	70	

Democrats strengthened their control of the Senate and regained control of the House, securing both legislative chambers.

=== Ballot measures ===
==== Constitutional Amendment 1 ====
The New Mexico Denial of Bail Measure is a constitutional amendment that allows courts to deny bail to a defendant charged with a felony, but only if the defendant is deemed a threat to the public. It was designed to retain the right to pretrial release for non-dangerous defendants.

New Mexico Denial of Bail Measure
Choice	Votes	%
For	616,887	87.23
Against	90,293	12.77
Total	707,180	100.00
Source: Ballotpedia

== Judicial elections ==
=== Supreme Court ===
2016 New Mexico Supreme Court election
- November 8, 2016
Nominee	Judith Nakamura	Michael Vigil
Party	Republican	Democratic
Popular vote	396,303	365,790
Percentage	52.0%	48.0%
- County results Nakamura: 50–60% 60–70% 70–80% Vigil: 50–60% 60–70% 70–80%
Supreme Court Justice before election
Judith Nakamura
Republican
Elected Supreme Court Justice
Judith Nakamura
Republican

Incumbent justice Judith Nakamura was appointed by Governor Susana Martinez on November 12, 2015, after Justice Richard C. Bosson retired. Justice Nakamura ran to complete the remainder of Justice Bosson's term ending in 2020, and was challenged by Democratic candidate Michael Vigil, the chief judge of the New Mexico Court of Appeals.

To date, this the last time Republicans have won a statewide election in New Mexico.

==== General election ====
===== Polling =====
Poll source	Date(s) administered	Sample size (Note: Key: A – all adults RV – registered voters LV – likely voters V – unclear)	Margin of error	Judith Nakamura (R)	Michael Vigil (D)	Undecided
Research & Polling Inc.	November 1–3, 2016	504 (LV)	± 4.4%	45%	45%	10%

===== Results =====
2016 New Mexico Supreme Court election
Party	Candidate	Votes	%
Republican	Judith K. Nakamura (incumbent)	396,303	52.00%
Democratic	Michael E. Vigil	365,790	48.00%
Total votes		762,093	100.0%
Republican hold			

==== Retention election ====
Incumbent justice Barbara Vigil was up for retention for a full 8-year term.

2016 New Mexico Supreme Court, Justice Barbara J. Vigil (D) Retention election
Choice	Votes	%
For	448,125	71.60
Against	177,735	28.40
Total	625,860	100.00

=== Court of Appeals ===
Incumbent Judge Stephen French was appointed by Governor Susana Martinez on February 18, 2016, after Judge Cynthia Fry retired. Judge French ran for re-election to complete the remainder of Judge Fry's term ending in 2022. He was challenged by Democratic candidate Julie Vargas, a private attorney.

==== General election ====
2016 New Mexico Court of Appeals election
Party	Candidate	Votes	%
Democratic	Julie J. Vargas	395,227	52.48%
Republican	Stephen French (incumbent)	357,837	47.52%
Total votes		753,064	100.0%
Democratic gain from Republican			

==== Retention election ====
Incumbent Judges Jonathan Sutin, Timothy Garcia, and Monica Zamora were up for retention for a full 8-year term.

2016 New Mexico Court of Appeals, Judge Jonathan B. Sutin (R) Retention election
Choice	Votes	%
For	426,481	70.42
Against	179,122	29.58
Total	605,603	100.00

2016 New Mexico Court of Appeals, Judge Tim L. Garcia (D) Retention election
Choice	Votes	%
For	424,372	70.28
Against	179,423	29.72
Total	603,795	100.00

2016 New Mexico Court of Appeals, Judge M. Monica Zamora (D) Retention election
Choice	Votes	%
For	432,540	71.05
Against	176,230	28.95
Total	608,770	100.00
