= 2022 New Mexico elections =

- November 8, 2022
- Registered: 1,364,559
- Turnout: 52.38%

A general election was held in the U.S. state of New Mexico on November 8, 2022.

== Federal elections ==
=== U.S. House of Representatives ===
District		Incumbent				Candidates (Note: Declared candidates may seek election from other district, subject to redistricting. Some districts may have no incumbents, while others may have multiple incumbents due to redistricting.)
Location	2022 PVI	Member	Party	First elected	Status	Candidates
New Mexico 1	D+5	Melanie Stansbury	Democratic	2021 (special)	Incumbent re-elected.	▌ ✓ Melanie Stansbury (Democratic) 55.8%; ▌Michelle Garcia Holmes (Republican) 44.2%
New Mexico 2	D+1	Yvette Herrell	Republican	2020	Incumbent lost re-election. New member elected. Democratic gain.	▌ ✓ Gabe Vasquez (Democratic) 50.3%; ▌Yvette Herrell (Republican) 49.7%
New Mexico 3	D+4	Teresa Leger Fernandez	Democratic	2020	Incumbent re-elected.	▌ ✓ Teresa Leger Fernandez (Democratic) 58.2%; ▌Alexis Martinez Johnson (Republican) 41.8%

== State elections ==
=== Governor ===
Incumbent governor Michelle Lujan Grisham ran for reelection to a second term. She defeated the Republican candidate, former TV meteorologist Mark Ronchetti, with 52.0% of the vote.

=== Attorney general ===
Incumbent attorney general Hector Balderas was term-limited and ineligible to seek reelection. Democrat Raúl Torrez, the Bernalillo County District Attorney, defeated Republican Jeremy Gay, a U.S. Marine veteran, in the general election with 55.3% of the vote.

=== Secretary of state ===
Incumbent secretary of state Maggie Toulouse Oliver sought reelection to a second term. She defeated Republican Audrey Trujillo with 54.5% of the vote.

=== Commissioner of Public Lands ===
Incumbent Land Commissioner Stephanie Garcia Richard sought reelection to a second term. She defeated Republican Jefferson Byrd, a member of the New Mexico Public Regulation Commission, with 54.7% of the vote.

=== Treasurer ===
Incumbent Treasurer Tim Eichenberg was term-limited and ineligible to seek reelection. Democrat Laura Montoya defeated Republican Harry Montoya with 53.1% of the vote.

=== Auditor ===
Incumbent Auditor Brian Colón did not seek reelection and instead opted to run for attorney general. Democrat Joseph Maestas defeated Libertarian candidate Travis Sanchez with 61.9% of the vote.

=== State legislature ===
All of the seats of the New Mexico House of Representatives were up for election in 2022.

House of Representatives
Party	Before	After	Change
Democratic	45	45	Steady
Republican	24	25	▲1
Independent	1	0	▼1
Total	70	70	

== Judicial elections ==
=== Supreme Court ===
==== Position 1 ====
2022 New Mexico Supreme Court Position 1 special election
Candidate	Julie Vargas	Thomas C. Montoya
Party	Democratic	Republican
Popular vote	366,369	328,475
Percentage	52.73%	47.27%
- Vargas: 50–60% 60–70% 70–80% Montoya: 50–60% 60–70% 70–80% 80–90%
New Mexico Supreme Court Justice before election
Julie Vargas
Democratic
Elected New Mexico Supreme Court Justice
Julie Vargas
Democratic

Incumbent justice Julie Vargas was appointed to the New Mexico Supreme Court on December 19, 2020 after the retirement of Justice Judith Nakamura. Justice Vargas ran for re-election to complete the remainder of Justice Nakamura's term ending in 2028.

2022 New Mexico Supreme Court election (Position 1)
Party	Candidate	Votes	%
Democratic	Julie J. Vargas (incumbent)	366,369	52.73%
Republican	Thomas C. Montoya	328,475	47.27%
Total votes		694,844	100.0%
Democratic hold			

==== Position 2 ====
2022 New Mexico Supreme Court Position 2 special election
Candidate	Briana Zamora	Kerry J. Morris
Party	Democratic	Republican
Popular vote	375,836	318,215
Percentage	54.15%	45.85%
- Zamora: 50–60% 60–70% 70–80% Morris: 50–60% 60–70% 70–80% 80–90%
New Mexico Supreme Court Justice before election
Briana Zamora
Democratic
Elected New Mexico Supreme Court Justice
Briana Zamora
Democratic

Incumbent justice Briana Zamora was appointed to the court on July 15, 2021 after Justice Barbara J. Vigil retired. Justice Zamora ran for reelection to complete the remainder of Justice Barbara Vigil's term, ending in 2024.

2022 New Mexico Supreme Court election (Position 2)
Party	Candidate	Votes	%
Democratic	Briana H. Zamora (incumbent)	375,836	54.15%
Republican	Kerry J. Morris	318,215	45.85%
Total votes		694,051	100.0%
Democratic hold			

==== Retention election ====
Justice Michael Vigil faced a retention election for a full 8-year term.

2022 New Mexico Supreme Court, Judge Michael E. Vigil (D) Retention election
Choice	Votes	%
For	408,573	69.30
Against	180,965	30.70
Total	589,538	100.00

=== Court of Appeals ===
Results by county Baca: 40-50%; 50–60%; 60–70%; 70–80%; Johnson: 50–60%; 60–70%; 70–80%; 80–90%

==== Position 1 ====
Incumbent Judge Gerald Baca was appointed to the New Mexico Court of Appeals on March 19, 2021, due to the elevation of Judge Julie J. Vargas to the Supreme Court. Judge Baca ran for reelection to a full 8-year term.

2022 New Mexico Court of Appeals election (Position 1)
Party	Candidate	Votes	%
Democratic	Gerald Edward Baca (incumbent)	349,577	50.41%
Republican	Barbara V. Johnson	306,521	44.20%
Libertarian	Sophie I. Cooper	37,336	5.39%
Total votes		693,434	100.0%
Democratic hold			

==== Position 2 ====
Results by county Wray: 40-50%; 50–60%; 60–70%; 70–80%; Lee: 40-50%; 50–60%; 60–70%; 70–80%

Incumbent Judge Katherine Anne Wray was appointed on September 23, 2021, to a vacancy caused by the elevation of Judge Briana Zamora to the Supreme Court. Judge Wray ran for reelection to a full 8-year term.

2022 New Mexico Court of Appeals election (Position 2)
Party	Candidate	Votes	%
Democratic	Katherine Anne Wray (incumbent)	350,229	50.69%
Republican	Gertrude Lee	297,057	42.99%
Libertarian	Stephen P. Curtis	43,632	6.32%
Total votes		690,918	100.0%
Democratic hold			

==== Retention election ====
Judge Jane Yohalem faced a retention election for a full 8-year term.

2022 New Mexico Court of Appeals, Judge Jane B. Yohalem (D) Retention election
Choice	Votes	%
For	390,800	67.50
Against	188,185	32.50
Total	578,985	100.00
