= 2020 New Mexico elections =

- November 3, 2020
- Registered: 1,351,811
- Turnout: 68.67%

A general election was held in the U.S. state of New Mexico on November 3, 2020. To vote by mail, registered New Mexico voters must have requested a ballot by October 30, 2020.

== Federal elections ==
=== U.S. President ===
2020 United States presidential election in New Mexico
Party	Candidate	Votes	%	±%
Democratic	Joe Biden	501,614	54.29	▲6.03
Republican	Donald Trump (incumbent)	401,894	43.50	▲3.46
Libertarian	Jo Jorgensen	12,585	1.36	▼7.98
Green	Howie Hawkins	4,426	0.48	▼0.76
Constitution	Sheila Tittle	1,806	0.20	▲0.05
Socialism and Liberation	Gloria La Riva	1,640	0.18	▲0.03
Majority		99,720	10.79	▲2.58
Total votes		923,965	100.00	

=== U.S. Senate ===
2020 United States Senate election in New Mexico
Party	Candidate	Votes	%	±%
Democratic	Ben Ray Luján	474,483	51.73	▼3.83
Republican	Mark Ronchetti	418,483	45.62	▲1.18
Libertarian	Bob Walsh	24,271	2.65	
Total votes		917,237	100.00	
Democratic hold				

=== U.S. House of Representatives ===
District	Incumbent			This race	
District	Member	Party	First elected	Results	Candidates
New Mexico 1	Deb Haaland	Democratic	2018	Incumbent re-elected.	✓ Deb Haaland (Democratic) 58.19%; Michelle Garcia Holmes (Republican) 41.81%
New Mexico 2	Xochitl Torres Small	Democratic	2018	Incumbent lost re-election. New member elected. Republican gain.	✓ Yvette Herrell (Republican) 53.70%; Xochitl Torres Small (Democratic) 46.25%
New Mexico 3	Ben Ray Luján	Democratic	2008	Incumbent retired. New member elected. Democratic hold.	✓ Teresa Leger Fernandez (Democratic) 58.68%; Alexis Johnson (Republican) 41.32%

== State elections ==
=== State legislature ===
All of the seats of the New Mexico Senate and the New Mexico House of Representatives were up for election in 2020. Democrats held control of both chambers, maintaining a government trifecta.

Senate
Party	Before	After	Change
Democratic	26	27	▲1
Republican	16	15	▼1
Total	42	42	

House of Representatives
Party	Before	After	Change
Democratic	46	44	▼2
Republican	24	25	▲1
Independent	0	1	▲1
Total	70	70	

== Judicial elections ==
=== Supreme Court ===
==== Position 1 ====
2020 New Mexico Supreme Court Position 1 election
Nominee	Shannon Bacon	Ned Fuller
Party	Democratic	Republican
Popular vote	495,759	394,595
Percentage	55.7%	44.3%
- County results Bacon: 50–60% 60–70% 70–80% Fuller: 50–60% 60–70% 70–80%
Supreme Court Justice before election
Shannon Bacon
Democratic
Elected Supreme Court Justice
Shannon Bacon
Democratic

Incumbent justice Shannon Bacon ran for a term ending in 2026 after being appointed by Governor Michelle Lujan Grisham on January 25, 2019. She was challenged by Republican candidate Ned Fuller, the deputy district attorney of the Eleventh Judicial District.

2020 New Mexico Supreme Court election (Position 1)
Party	Candidate	Votes	%
Democratic	Shannon Bacon (incumbent)	495,759	55.68%
Republican	Ned Fuller	394,595	44.32%
Total votes		890,354	100.0%
Democratic hold			

==== Position 2 ====
2020 New Mexico Supreme Court Position 2 election
Nominee	David Thomson	Kerry Morris
Party	Democratic	Republican
Popular vote	480,507	406,791
Percentage	54.15%	45.85%
- County results Thomson: 50–60% 60–70% 70–80% Morris: 50–60% 60–70% 70–80%
Supreme Court Justice before election
David Thomson
Democratic
Elected Supreme Court Justice
David Thomson
Democratic

Incumbent justice David Thomson ran for a term ending in 2026 after being appointed by Governor Michelle Lujan Grisham on January 25, 2019. He was challenged by Republican candidate Kerry Morris, a former prosecutor in the Bernalillo County District Attorney office.

2020 New Mexico Supreme Court election (Position 2)
Party	Candidate	Votes	%
Democratic	David K. Thomson (incumbent)	480,507	54.15%
Republican	Kerry Morris	406,791	45.85%
Total votes		887,298	100.0%
Democratic hold			

=== Court of Appeals ===
==== Position 1 ====
Judge Zachary Ives ran for a full 8-year term after being appointed by Governor Michelle Lujan Grisham on January 31, 2019.

2020 New Mexico Court of Appeals election (Position 1)
Party	Candidate	Votes	%
Democratic	Zachary Ives (incumbent)	464,043	52.50%
Republican	Barbara Johnson	419,927	47.50%
Total votes		883,970	100.0%
Democratic hold			

==== Position 2 ====
Judge Shammara Henderson ran for a term ending in 2024 after being appointed by Governor Michelle Lujan Grisham on February 14, 2020.

2020 New Mexico Court of Appeals election (Position 2)
Party	Candidate	Votes	%
Democratic	Shammara Henderson (incumbent)	450,566	50.97%
Republican	Gertrude Lee	370,778	41.95%
Libertarian	Stephen Curtis	62,547	7.08%
Total votes		883,891	100.0%
Democratic hold			

==== Position 3 ====
Judge Jane Yohalem ran for a term ending in 2022 after being appointed by Governor Michelle Lujan Grisham on June 20, 2020.

2020 New Mexico Court of Appeals election (Position 3)
Party	Candidate	Votes	%
Democratic	Jane Yohalem (incumbent)	456,645	51.84%
Republican	Thomas Montoya	424,153	48.15%
Total votes		880,798	100.0%
Democratic hold			

==== Retention election ====
Judge Jacqueline Medina was up for retention for a full 8-year term.

2020 New Mexico Court of Appeals, Judge Jaqueline Medina (D) Retention election
Choice	Votes	%
For	540,619	73.07
Against	199,217	26.93
Total	739,836	100.00

== See also ==
- Elections in New Mexico
- Bilingual elections requirement for New Mexico (per Voting Rights Act Amendments of 2006)
- Politics of New Mexico
- Political party strength in New Mexico
