= Tony Scarborough =

American judge (born 1946)

Tony Scarborough (born 1946) is a former justice of the New Mexico Supreme Court from January 1, 1987, until his resignation on July 5, 1989, serving as chief justice for part of that term.

He was born in Russellville, Kentucky. His father James Scarborough was a judge.

Scarborough "graduated from New Mexico Military Institute in Roswell before receiving his Bachelor of Arts in Zoology from the University of Arizona and law degree from Southern Methodist University in Dallas, Texas". He gained admitted to the bar New Mexico in 1965. He briefly worked as an FBI Special Agent.

Following the retirement of Chief Justice William R. Federici in December 1986, Harry Stowers was elected chief justice by his fellow justices. Some members of the court objected that the vote should not have been taken until after newly elected justices were seated on January 1, 1987. Consequently, once the new justices were sworn in, a new vote was held, and Scarborough was unanimously selected as chief justice, the first newly elected member of the court to be chosen for that office.

In 1989, Scarborough stepped down from the court to run for governor.

Political offices
| Preceded by William R. Federici | Justice of the New Mexico Supreme Court; 1987–1989 | Succeeded by Charles B. Larrabee |
| Preceded by Harry Stowers | Chief Justice of the New Mexico Supreme Court; 1987–1989 | Succeeded by Dan Sosa |
