= Paul Kennedy (American judge) =

American judge (born c. 1949)

Paul J. Kennedy (born c. 1949) is a New Mexico attorney who served as a justice of the New Mexico Supreme Court from September 13, 2002 until his resignation on December 20, 2002, and again in 2012. Appointed by Governor Susana Martinez, Kennedy had previously served on the court under appointment from Governor Gary Johnson.

== Education, military service, and career ==
Kennedy was raised in Philadelphia and received a B.A. from Saint Joseph's University there. After serving stateside in the United States Marine Corps during the Vietnam War, Kennedy used a Fulbright Scholarship to earn a Juris Doctor from Georgetown University.

He practiced law at his own firm in New Mexico for thirty-six years. His practice focused on the civil rights including the right to free speech. He is fluent in both English and Spanish.

== Judicial career ==
Kennedy first served as a judge when he was temporarily appointed by Governor Gary Johnson in 2002, to a seat on the state supreme court vacated by the retirement of Joseph F. Baca, until the election of a successor. After serving out his term, he returned to private practice. In 2012, Governor Martinez nominated Kennedy to the court again after he was unanimously selected by a non-partisan committee. Kennedy ran as a Republican for reelection to the seed, but was defeated by Barbara J. Vigil.

Political offices
Preceded by Joseph F. Baca; Patricio M. Serna	Justice of the New Mexico Supreme Court; 2002–2002; 2012–2012	Succeeded by Richard C. Bosson; Barbara J. Vigil
