= Edward Mann =

Edward Mann may refer to:

- Edward Mann (Australian politician) (1874–1951), Nationalist member of the Australian House of Representatives and radio commentator
- Edward A. Mann (1867-1915), judge and legislator in New Mexico
- Edward C. Mann (1880–1931), United Statrs Representative from South Carolina
- Edward S. Mann (1905–2005), educator and president of the Eastern Nazarene College in Massachusetts
- Earl Mann, or Edward W. Mann, state legislator in Colorado
- Edward Mann (designer), London-based hat designer active 1950s-1980s
- Edward Mann (boxer), ABA Middleweight Champion
- Edward Mann (horseman) in Canadian Horse Racing Hall of Fame
- Edward Mann (editor) of I Met My Love Again
- Ed Mann (born 1954), American musician

== See also ==
- Ted Mann (disambiguation)
