= William R. Federici =

American judge (1917–2009)

William R. Federici (July 15, 1917 – September 9, 2009) was an American judge. He was justice of the New Mexico Supreme Court from April 15, 1977 until his retirement on December 31, 1986, serving as chief justice from 1984 until the end of the term.

== Career ==
Born in Cimarron, New Mexico, to Italian immigrants, he received an undergraduate degree from the University of New Mexico in 1939, and a J.D. from the University of Colorado Law School in 1941. After graduating from law school, Federici became a New Mexico assistant attorney general until 1942, when he began service in the United States Army in the Pacific Theatre of World War II, remaining in service until 1946.

He lived for a time in Washington, D.C., where he was an aide to Congressman Antonio M. Fernández until 1946, when he returned to the office of the New Mexico Attorney General. In 1948, he entered private practice with the law firm of Seth and Montgomery in Santa Fe, and "became a partner shortly thereafter". In practice, he "specialized in commercial litigation, probate, administrative law, oil and gas law, banking and real estate".

On March 22, 1977, Governor Jerry Apodaca appointed Federici to a seat on the state supreme court vacated by the retirement of Justice LaFel E. Oman. Federici was reelected to a full eight-year term in 1988, and became chief justice at the beginning of 1984. On July 23, 1985, Federici confirmed that he would not seek reelection in 1986, retiring from the court at the end of his term.

== Personal life and death ==
On May 8, 1945, coincidentally V-E Day, Federici married Elsie Marie Frizell in Springer, New Mexico, with whom he had two sons and two daughters.

He died at his home in Santa Fe at the age of 92.

Political offices
Preceded by LaFel E. Oman	Justice of the New Mexico Supreme Court; 1977–1986	Succeeded by Tony Scarborough
Preceded by William F. Riordan	Chief Justice of the New Mexico Supreme Court; 1984–1986	Succeeded by Harry Stowers
