= Clingman =

Clingman may refer to:

- Clingman, North Carolina
- Clingman Avenue Historic District
- Clingman Peak
- Clingman (surname)
