= Kenneth B. Wilson =

American judge (born 1938)

Kenneth B. Wilson (born 1938) was a justice of the New Mexico Supreme Court from December 29, 1989 to November 30, 1990, having resigned after defeat in his bid for reelection.

Wilson received a Bachelor of Business Administration from Baylor University in 1973, followed by a J.D. from Baylor Law School in 1974. He practiced in New Mexico, and was appointed to succeed Charles B. Larrabee in the court's Hanna Seat by Governor Garrey Carruthers on December 29, 1989. Wilson lost the partisan election to Gene E. Franchini the following year, thereafter returning to private practice.

== Opinions ==
Notable opinions authored by Wilson include:

- State Ex Rel. Reynolds v. Aamodt, 111 N.M. 4, 800 P.2d 1061 (N.M. 1990).
- State v. Portillo, 110 N.M. 135, 793 P.2d 265 (N.M. 1990).
- McConal Aviation v. Commercial Aviation Ins. Co., 110 N.M. 697, 799 P.2d (N.M. 1990).
- State v. Ybarra, 111 N.M. 234, 804 P.2d (N.M. 1990).
- Grantland v. Lea Regional Hosp., Inc., 110 N.M. 378, 796 P.2d 599 (N.M. 1990).

Political offices
Preceded by Charles B. Larrabee	Justice of the New Mexico Supreme Court; 1989–1990	Succeeded by Gene E. Franchini
