= Justice Cooley =

Justice Cooley may refer to:

- Alford W. Cooley (1873–1913), justice of the New Mexico Territorial Supreme Court
- Thomas M. Cooley (1824–1898), chief justice of the Michigan Supreme Court
