= Eugene D. Lujan =

American judge

Chief Justice of the New Mexico Supreme Court
- In office 1951–1953

Justice of the New Mexico Supreme Court
- In office 1945–1959
- Preceded by: Martin A. Threet
- Succeeded by: Irwin Moise

Personal details
- Born: April 25, 1887 Mora, New Mexico
- Died: January 10, 1980 (aged 92) Albuquerque, New Mexico
- Party: Democratic

Eugene David Lujan (April 25, 1887 – January 10, 1980) was a justice of the New Mexico Supreme Court from 1945 to 1959.

== Life ==
He was born in Mora, New Mexico on April 25, 1887. While still in high school, he worked for a law firm in Las Vegas, New Mexico, and later had a position in Bolivia with the U.S. State Department, during World War I. He received both a bachelor's and master's degree in law in National University (which later became George Washington University), in Washington D.C. Prior to being elected to the New Mexico Supreme Court, he was a District Attorney at the Second Judicial District in Albuquerque and then a judge at the Seventh District in Socorro. Lujan was elected to the New Mexico Supreme Court in 1945 and retired in 1959.

Lujan and his wife, Rita, had one daughter and one son. Lujan died in a hospital in Albuquerque on January 10, 1980, at the age of 92.

Lujan was the grandfather of New Mexico governor Michelle Lujan Grisham, fifth cousin of Santa Fe mayor Manuel Lujan Sr., and second cousin once removed of New Mexico House speaker Ben Luján.
