= Charles Larrabee =

Charles Larrabee may refer to:

- C. X. Larrabee (Charles Xavier Larrabee, 1843–1914), co-founder of the town of Fairhaven, Washington
- Charles B. Larrabee (1926–2008), American attorney and justice of the New Mexico Supreme Court
- Charles H. Larrabee (1820–1883), U.S. Representative from Wisconsin
