= Justice Moise =

Justice Moise may refer to:

- Harold A. Moise (1879–1958), associate justice of the Louisiana Supreme Court
- Irwin S. Moise (1906–1984), associate justice of the New Mexico Supreme Court
