= Justice Chavez =

Justice Chavez may refer to:

- David Chávez (1897–1984), associate justice of the New Mexico Supreme Court
- Edward L. Chávez (born 1957), associate justice and chief justice of the New Mexico Supreme Court
