= William F. Riordan =

American judge (1941–2020)

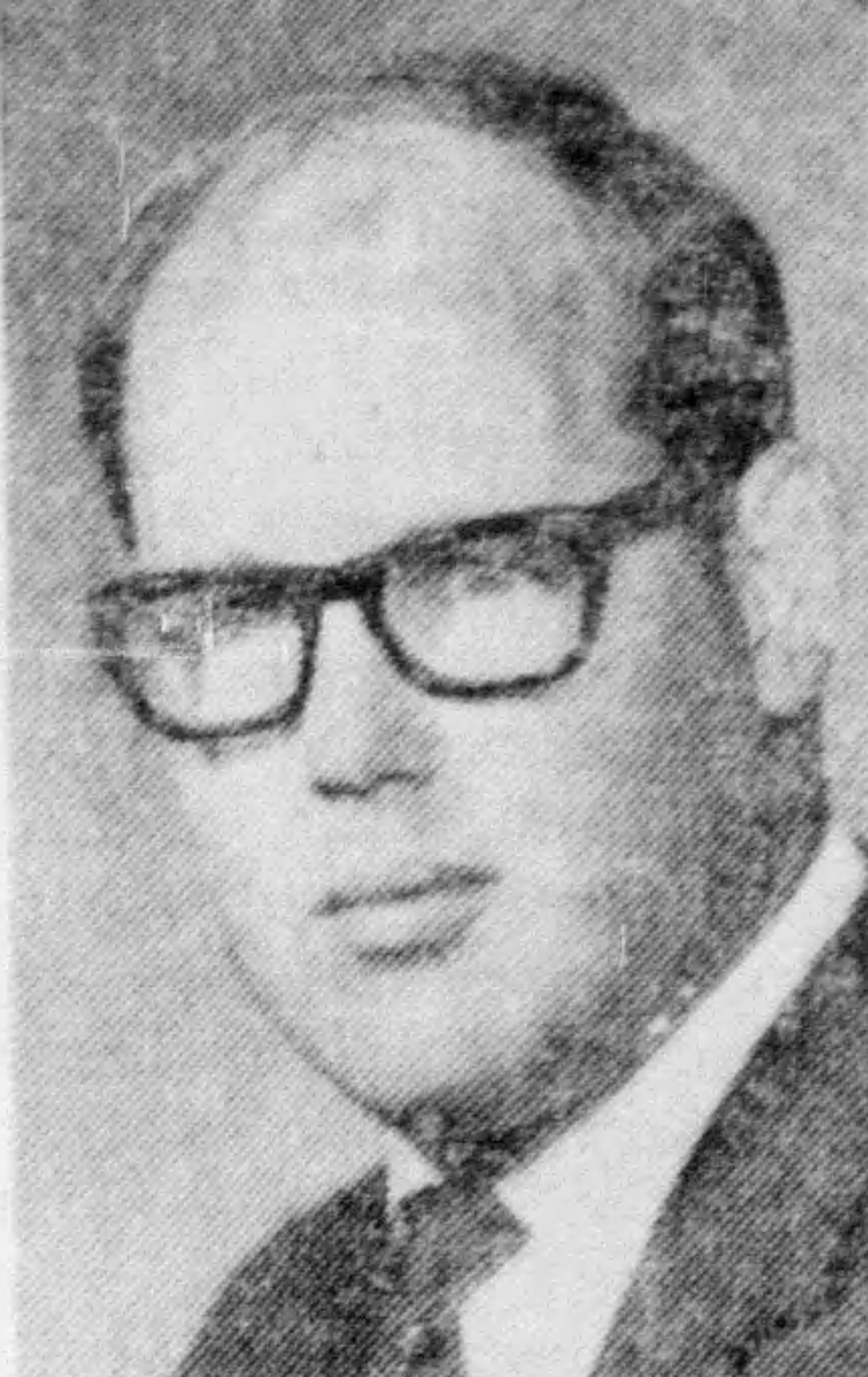

Chief Justice of the New Mexico Supreme Court
- In office January 8, 1986 – December 3, 1986
- Preceded by: William R. Federici
- Succeeded by: Harry E. Stowers Jr.

Justice of the New Mexico Supreme Court
- In office January 1, 1981 – December 31, 1986
- Preceded by: Edwin L. Felter
- Succeeded by: Richard E. Ransom

Personal details
- Born: William Francis Riordan; March 26, 1941 Wichita, Kansas
- Died: November 16, 2020 (aged 79)
- Party: Republican
- Spouse: Jocelyn Ruebel
- Children: 1 son, 3 daughters
- Education: University of New Mexico (B.B.A., J.D.)

William Francis Riordan (March 26, 1941 – November 16, 2020) was an American jurist who served as a justice of the New Mexico Supreme Court from 1981 to 1986, serving most of his final year on the court as chief justice.

== Early life and career ==
Riordan was born in Wichita, Kansas, and grew up in Albuquerque, New Mexico. He attended Highland High School and went on to attend the University of New Mexico, earning a bachelor's degree in business administration in 1965 and a Juris Doctor from its School of Law in 1968.

He began his legal career with the Legal Aid Society in 1968, and became an assistant district attorney in Bernalillo County, New Mexico, in 1969. He was also an assistant attorney general for state before turning to private practice in 1972. In 1978, he became a children's court judge.

== Supreme Court and later career ==
Riordan was elected to the New Mexico Supreme Court in 1980 as a Republican, defeating incumbent Democratic Justice Edwin L. Felter, and served from January 1, 1981, to December 31, 1986. In 1986, he was elected by his fellow supreme court justices as the court's chief justice, and served from January 8, 1986, to December 3, 1986. Under his tenure as chief justice, the court undertook several projects in a short period of time, including mandating continuing legal education for the state bar, establishing an attorney's specialization program, implementing a new code of ethics, and recodification of the Supreme Court's rules.

From January through March 1987, he served as acting Secretary of Corrections for New Mexico, and as Independent Counsel for the City of Albuquerque from 1987 to 1990. He returned to private practice for the remainder of his life, and developed a dynamic mediation-arbitration practice that handled over 2000 cases.

He died on November 16, 2020, after a brief illness.

== Electoral history ==
1980 general election: New Mexico Supreme Court
| Party | Candidate | Votes | % |
|---|---|---|---|
| Republican | William F. Riordan | 204,102 | 52.9 |
| Democratic | Edwin L. Felter (i) | 181,513 | 47.1 |

Political offices
| Preceded by Edwin L. Felter | Justice of the New Mexico Supreme Court; 1981–1986 | Succeeded by Richard E. Ransom |
