= Benjamin S. Baker =

American judge (1850–1945)

Benjamin Stanton Baker (February 8, 1850 – August 15, 1945) was an American lawyer and judge who served as the United States Attorney for the District of Nebraska from 1890 to 1894, and as a justice of the New Mexico Territorial Supreme Court from 1902 to 1904.

== Early life, education, and career ==
Born in Sabula, Jackson County, Iowa, to Samuel and Elizabeth (Lewis) Baker, from the age of five years Baker was raised on a farm in Johnson County, Iowa, and attended the district schools. At age fourteen, he left home and began teaching at a country school.

In 1865 he became a student in the preparatory department of the University of Iowa, and in 1871 graduated from the university with the degree of Bachelor of Arts in Didactics. Returning to teaching, he was principal of schools in Mason City and later in Webster City, resigning the latter position to become a law student at Iowa State University, from which he received an LL.B. degree in 1874. Admitted to the practice of law that same year, he practiced in Webster City for three years, then moved his practice to Fairbury, Nebraska, where he remained for twelve years, until February 1890.

== Public office and judicial service ==
Baker first held public office when elected county superintendent of schools for Hamilton County for one term. In 1888, he was elected as a Republican to the Nebraska Legislature, representing a district comprising Jefferson and Fair counties. During his legislative service, he was instrumental in promoting Nebraska's registration law and authored legislation allowing foreign corporations to become domestic corporations by filing articles with the secretary of state. In 1890, President Benjamin Harrison appointed Baker as appointed United States Attorney for the District of Nebraska, a position that Baker held for four years.

In 1895, Baker was elected judge of the Fourth Judicial District of Nebraska. He was reelected at the conclusion of his first term and served on the district court bench until 1902. During his tenure, he presided over several notable cases, including a state embezzlement prosecution involving state officials and the city treasurer of Omaha. In 1902, Baker resigned from the Nebraska district court and was appointed by President Theodore Roosevelt to serve as a justice of the Supreme Court of New Mexico. He served for approximately three years, but in 1904 complaints were made against him to the United States Department of Justice, particularly alleging that although he was honest and forthright in his duties, he was neglecting certain parts of the state. Baker was abruptly removed from office by President Roosevelt, and when Delegate Rodey of New Mexico went to the White House to urge the President to give Baker a hearing, Rodey learned that Baker had already been removed and that the case could not be considered further.

In 1912, Baker was appointed corporation counsel for the city of Omaha. He resigned from that position on January 1, 1913, in order to resume private practice. In the 1916 United States House of Representatives elections, he was nominated by the Republican Party as its candidate for Nebraska's second congressional district, but was defeated in the general election by incumbent Charles O. Lobeck.

In total, Baker was active in practice and politics in Omaha for more than forty years. Throughout his political activities, Baker was a member of the Republican Party.

== Personal life and death ==
On April 7, 1897, Baker married Myrtle I. Carroll in Omaha.

Baker celebrated his 88th birthday on February 8, 1938, declaring at the time that he expected to live to be a hundred, and that the secret to such longevity was to "keep breathing".

Baker died at his home in Omaha at the age of 95. His last words were "I'm so glad for the mothers and the wives whose boys and husbands will be coming back to them", in reference to news that day of the end of World War II.

Political offices
Preceded by Jonathan W. Crumpacker	Justice of the New Mexico Territorial Supreme Court; 1902–1904	Succeeded by Ira A. Abbott
