= Justice Fort =

Justice Fort may refer to:

- Tomlinson Fort (judge) (1870–1930), associate justice of the New Mexico Supreme Court
- John Franklin Fort (1852–1920), associate justice of the New Jersey Supreme Court
