= Joseph Martinez (disambiguation) =

Joseph Martinez may refer to:

- Joseph Martinez

== See also ==
- Joe Martinez (disambiguation)
- Josef Martínez Venezuelan footballer
- Josep Martínez, Spanish footballer
