= Edwin L. Felter =

American judge (1917–2004)

Edwin L. Felter (August 24, 1917 – August 29, 2004) was an American judge. He was a justice of the New Mexico Supreme Court from August 16, 1979 until his retirement on December 31, 1980.

Born in Des Moines, Iowa, Felter graduated from high school in Tucumcari, New Mexico, and later received his J.D. from American University Washington College of Law in 1943. He served for two years in the United States Navy towards the end of World War II, in the Asiatic-Pacific Theater.

Felter gained admission to the bar in New Mexico in 1946, and entered into a law practice with Joseph Montoya, who later became prominent as a politician. In 1970, Governor Bruce King appointed Deming to a seat on the New Mexico First Judicial District Court, to which Felter was reelected in 1972, and again in 1978.

In August 1979, Governor King appointed Felter to a seat on the state supreme court vacated by the death of Justice John B. McManus Jr. Felter ran for election to a full term on the court in 1980, but was defeated by Republican William F. Riordan, thereafter serving until the end of his term on December 31, 1980.

Felter died in Colorado Springs at the age of 87.

Political offices
Preceded by John B. McManus Jr.	Justice of the New Mexico Supreme Court; 1979–1980	Succeeded by William F. Riordan
