= Joseph F. Baca =

American judge (born 1936)

Joseph Francis Baca

Chief Justice of the New Mexico Supreme Court
- In office 1994–1996
- Preceded by: Seth D. Montgomery
- Succeeded by: Gene E. Franchini

Justice of the New Mexico Supreme Court
- In office January 1, 1989 – July 31, 2002
- Preceded by: Mary Coon Walters
- Succeeded by: Paul J. Kennedy

Personal details
- Born: Joseph Francis Baca; October 1, 1936 (age 90) Albuquerque, New Mexico, U.S.
- Party: Democratic
- Spouse: Dorothy Lee Burrow
- Children: 3
- Education: University of New Mexico (BA); George Washington University Law School (JD); University of Virginia School of Law (LLM)

Joseph Francis Baca (born October 1, 1936) is a New Mexico lawyer and judge who served as a justice of the New Mexico Supreme Court from January 1, 1989 to July 31, 2002, serving as chief justice from 1994 to 1996. He has engaged in various other avenues of public service at the state and national levels, and in 1994 was recommended by the Hispanic National Bar Association as a potential nominee for appointment to the Supreme Court of the United States.

== Early life, education, and career ==
Born in Albuquerque, New Mexico, Baca attended St. Mary's High School in Albuquerque. As a youth, he "decided he wanted to become a lawyer after hearing a radio speech by the late Sen. Dennis Chávez".

Baca received an undergraduate degree from the University of New Mexico in 1960, followed by a J.D. from the George Washington University Law School in 1964. He worked as a law clerk in the New Mexico Highway Department from 1964 to 1965, and as an assistant district attorney in Santa Fe from 1965 to 1966, thereafter entering private practice in Albuquerque until 1972. He later received an LL.M. from the University of Virginia School of Law, in 1992.

== Judicial service ==
In 1972, Governor Bruce King appointed Baca to a seat on the New Mexico Second Judicial District Court, to which Baca was then reelected three times, to full six-year terms, in 1972, 1978 and 1984. He held various positions in the District Court, including administrative judge of the children's court, presiding judge and the administrative judge of the Bernalillo County grand jury, serving in his last term as chief district judge. As a district court judge, Baca "was known for being tough on criminals", being given the nickname "Maximum Joe" for imposing long sentences.

In 1988, Baca received the Democratic nomination for a seat on the state supreme court, and was elected to an eight-year term that November, handily defeating Republican opponent Ken McDaniel.

In 1994, the Hispanic National Bar Association recommended Baca as a potential nominee for the seat on the Supreme Court of the United States vacated by the retirement of Justice Harry Blackmun. Senator Jeff Bingaman wrote to President Bill Clinton endorsing this recommendation. Although Clinton chose federal appellate judge Stephen Breyer for the Supreme Court seat, Clinton did nominate Baca to serve as one of the eleven directors of the State Justice Institute. While serving on the court, Baca was also active in other areas of public service. In 1994, he was awarded the J. William Fulbright Distinguished Public Service Award. He was twice named by Hispanic Business Magazine as one of the "100 Most Influential Hispanics" in the United States.

In September 1994, it was announced that New Mexico Chief Justice Seth D. Montgomery would resign from the court due to health issues, and that Baca would succeed Montgomery as chief justice as of October 1, 1994. In April 1994, Baca temporarily stepped down as chief justice to allow fellow justice Stanley F. Frost to hold the seat until Frost's own planned resignation as of May 31, 1994, to seek cancer treatment. Baca thereafter resumed the office and completed his term as chief justice on January 1, 1997, and was succeeded in the role by Justice Gene E. Franchini. Baca was retained for another eight-year term in the November 1996 general election.

In 1998, Baca was appointed to the American Bar Association committee for the accreditation of law schools. In 1999, Baca was elected to the national board of directors for the American Judicature Society. On May 2, 2002, Baca announced his retirement from the court, effective July 31 of that year, noting that he would at that point have surpassed thirty years of judicial service. Paul J. Kennedy was temporarily appointed to Baca's seat pending the election of a successor. Baca indicated that he would continue working in mediation and arbitration, for which he had attended a program in California the previous year.

== Personal life ==
On June 28, 1969, Baca married Dorothy Lee Burrow of Las Vegas, with whom he has three daughters and five grandchildren. The couple were noted to have celebrated their 50th wedding anniversary in 2019.

Political offices
Preceded by Mary Coon Walters	Justice of the New Mexico Supreme Court; 1989–2002	Succeeded by Paul J. Kennedy
