= John F. Simms Sr. =

American judge (1885–1954)

John Field Simms Sr. (May 6, 1885 – February 11, 1954) was a justice of the New Mexico Supreme Court from March 15, 1929, to December 31, 1930. He was not nominated for reelection. His son, John F. Simms became Governor of New Mexico in 1955.

Born in Washington, Arkansas, Simms "received his law degree from Vanderbilt University in 1906 and was admitted to the Arkansas bar the same year". He was elected to one term in the Arkansas House of Representatives, and thereafter moved to New Mexico in 1914.

On March 15, 1929, Simms and Charles C. Catron were appointed by Governor Richard C. Dillon to two newly-created seats on the state supreme court.

He partnered with James R. Modrall. The University of New Mexico has a lectureship named for him.

Simms married Anne Clapton Schluter. His son was campaigning for the Democratic Party nomination when Simms died. Another of his sons was Dr. Albert G. Simms. He was pinned against a tree and both his legs broken in an auto accident.

Simms died of a heart attack at the age of 68.

Political offices
| Preceded by Newly created seat | Justice of the New Mexico Supreme Court; 1929–1930 | Succeeded by [[]] |
