= Jonathan W. Crumpacker =

American judge (1854–1904)

Jonathan William Crumpacker (September 6, 1854 – March 16, 1904) was an Indiana lawyer and politician who served as a justice of the New Mexico Territorial Supreme Court from 1898 to 1902.

== Early life, education, and career ==
Born in New Durham Township, LaPorte County, Indiana, Crumpacker graduated from the civil engineering department of the University of Michigan, also attending classes in the law department. He thereafter read law with Judge Talcott of Valparaiso while also teaching school. He spent about a year working for the Canada Southern Railroad as a civil engineer, then a year in the same capacity on the western division of the Baltimore & Ohio Railroad, until it was completed. He entered the practice of law on April 1, 1875, in Westville, Indiana, and gained admission to the bar on September 6, 1875, the day he turned 21.

He was actively affiliated with the Republican Party, and, after declining a nomination for prosecuting attorney, was persuaded to become the candidate for mayor of La Porte, for which he was narrowly defeated. He was a delegate to the 1888 Republican National Convention, and in 1892 he was nominated for a seat in the Indiana Senate, to which he was elected, becoming the first Republican senator elected in the county in 28 years. He was subsequently re-elected to a second term.

== Judicial service and later life ==
On November 18, 1897, President William McKinley appointed Crumpacker associate Justice of the territorial court of New Mexico, for which Crumpacker had been endorsed by Indiana senator Charles W. Fairbanks. Crumpacker was confirmed by the United States Senate on January 11, 1898.

In December 1901, it was reported that Crumpacker had "handed his resignation to the president and withdrawn from the race to succeed himself". He thereafter returned with his family to La Porte, Indiana.

== Personal life and death ==
Crumpacker was a cousin of Congressman Edgar D. Crumpacker.

On September 17, 1881, Crumpacker married Maggie Regan, with whom he had a daughter and a son. Maggie died in Albuquerque, New Mexico, in May, 1898. After remaining a widower for two years, Crumpacker married Margaret Murray, of Woodstock, Canada.

In October 1902, Crumpacker was reported to have suffered a paralytic stroke, and at one point in December of that year it was reported that Crumpacker was dying, and that it was "feared he will not live through night". though he lived for over a year after that. Crumpacker died of typhoid fever in La Porte, Indiana, at the age of 50.

Political offices
Preceded by Needham C. Collier	Justice of the New Mexico Territorial Supreme Court; 1898–1902	Succeeded by Benjamin S. Baker
