= Justice Sosa =

Justice Sosa may refer to:

- Dan Sosa Jr. (1924–2016), justice of the New Mexico Supreme Court
- Manuel Sosa (judge) (born 1950), Chief Justice of Belize
