= Catron =

Catron can refer to:

== Places ==
- Catron, Missouri, in the United States
- Catron County, New Mexico, in the United States

== People ==
- Charles C. Catron (1879–1951), justice of the New Mexico Supreme Court
- John Catron (1786–1865), United States Supreme Court justice
- Thomas B. Catron (1840–1921), U.S. Senator from New Mexico
- Sam Catron (1953–2002), assassinated sheriff of Pulaski County, Kentucky, USA
- Michael Catron (born 1955), American publisher
- Joevan Catron (born 1988), American professional basketball player

== Other uses ==
- Pheniprazine, a MAOI antidepressant
