= Justice McKinnon =

Justice McKinnon may refer to:

- Dan A. McKinnon III (1939–2003), associate justice of the New Mexico Supreme Court
- Laurie McKinnon (born 1960), associate justice of the Montana Supreme Court
