= Howard L. Bickley =

American judge (1871–1947)

Judge of the New Mexico Supreme Court
- In office January 1, 1925 – March 4, 1947
- Preceded by: Tomlinson Fort
- Succeeded by: James C. Compton

Personal details
- Born: May 3, 1871 Mexico, Missouri, U.S.
- Died: March 4, 1947 (aged 75) Santa Fe, New Mexico, U.S.
- Spouse: Ruth K. Phillips (m. 1897; died 1910)
- Children: 1
- Education: University of Missouri School of Law

Howard Lee Bickley (May 3, 1871 – March 4, 1947) was an American lawyer and judge. Originally from Missouri, he relocated to New Mexico and became chief justice of the New Mexico Supreme Court.

== Life and career ==
Bickley was born in Mexico, Missouri. He graduated from the University of Missouri School of Law in 1895, and then returned to Mexico to practice law. He was elected prosecuting attorney for Audrain County on the Democratic ticket. He moved to Raton, New Mexico in 1904, and practiced law there until he became a judge.

He was elected to the New Mexico Supreme Court as a Democrat, and began his service January 1, 1925. He was re-elected in 1932 and 1940. He served as chief justice three times during his tenure, the last time from January 1, 1947 until his death. He administered the oath of office to four governors.

In both 1930 when Edward Terry Sanford died, and in 1932 when Oliver Wendell Holmes Jr. retired from the Supreme Court of the United States, Bickley was on President Herbert Hoover’s list of possible replacements, although the seats ultimately went to Owen J. Roberts and Benjamin N. Cardozo.

Bickley died of a sudden heart attack in his home in Santa Fe the night of March 4, 1947. A freemason, his funeral services were conducted on March 6 at the Scottish Rite Cathedral in Santa Fe. State offices were closed the same day for an hour and a half in his memory. He was buried in Fairmont Cemetery in Raton, next to his wife.

== Personal life ==
He married Ruth K. Phillips in 1897 in Mexico, Missouri; Ruth died in 1910 and he did not remarry. They had one daughter, Frances.
