= Tomlinson Fort (New Mexico politician) =

American judge (1870–1930)

Tomlinson Fort (May 8, 1870 – March 9, 1930) was a justice of the New Mexico Supreme Court from September 19, 1924 to December 31, 1924, having not been nominated for reelection.

Born in Georgia, Fort entered the practice of law in 1894, and moved to Roswell, New Mexico in 1912. He served as a city attorney and state legislator, and for three months as a justice of the state supreme court. He was appointed to the court by Governor James F. Hinkle following the early resignation of Justice Sam G. Bratton. Hinkle initially considered appointing one of the candidates and then running for the seat, but decided to appoint Fort so that the selection of a successor would remain up to the voters.

Fort died in Roswell after a lengthy period of poor health, culminating in a month-long serious illness.

Political offices
Preceded by Sam G. Bratton	Justice of the New Mexico Supreme Court; 1924–1924	Succeeded by Howard L. Bickley
