= Charles C. Catron =

American judge (1879–1951)

Charles Christopher Catron (September 30, 1879 – November 8, 1951) was an American lawyer, politician, and judge who served as a justice of the New Mexico Supreme Court from March 15, 1929 to December 31, 1930. He was not nominated for reelection.

== Early life, education, and career ==
Although his family resided in the Territory of New Mexico, Catron was born in New Haven, Connecticut. His father, Thomas B. Catron, became a territorial delegate, and was the first United States Senator from New Mexico following statehood in 1912. Catron was educated in the United States and abroad, receiving a Ph.B. from the University of Chicago in 1902, and gained admission to the bar in New Mexico bar in 1903. Catron served in the first New Mexico Legislature in 1912.

== Judicial service ==
On March 15, 1929, Catron and John F. Simms Sr. were appointed by Governor Richard C. Dillon to two newly-created seats on the state supreme court. Catron was speculated to be a candidate for re-election in 1930. Despite his comparatively short service, the seat first held by Catron was thereafter called "The Catron Seat".

== Personal life and death ==
On April 10, 1907, Catron married Isabella Justina Christensen, in Los Angeles, California. They had one daughter, Suzanna, and one son, Jack.

Catron died at his home in Santa Fe, New Mexico, at the age of 72. Funeral services were held in Santa Fe the following day.

Legal offices
Preceded by Newly created seat	Justice of the New Mexico Supreme Court; 1929–1930	Succeeded by Andrew H. Hudspeth
