= Alford W. Cooley =

American judge (1873–1913)

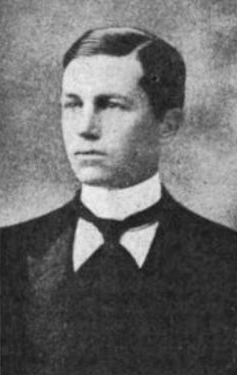

Justice of the New Mexico Territorial Supreme Court
- In office 1909–1910

Member of the New York State Assembly
- In office 1900–1901

Personal details
- Born: Alford Warriner Cooley; April 9, 1873 Westchester, New York, US
- Died: July 19, 1913 (aged 40) Topsfield, Massachusetts, US
- Spouse: Susan Dexter (m. 1904)
- Children: 1
- Education: Harvard College; Columbia Law School
- Occupation: Lawyer, judge

Alford Warriner Cooley (April 9, 1873 – July 19, 1913) was an American attorney and judge who served as a justice of the New Mexico Territorial Supreme Court from 1909 to 1910.

== Life and career ==
Born in Westchester, New York, Cooley graduated from Harvard College in 1895 and from Columbia Law School in 1897. He served as an inspector of common schools in New York from 1896 to 1898, and gained admission to the New York bar in 1898. He was a member of the New York State Assembly from 1900 to 1901. He was clerk of the surrogate court of Westchester County from 1901 to 1903, a United States civil service commissioner from 1903 to 1906, and an assistant attorney general of the United States from 1906 to 1909. In 1909, he was appointed to the New Mexico Territorial Supreme Court by President Theodore Roosevelt, but resigned after less than two years due to failing health. He then traveled back to the East Coast for treatment, in a car provided by former ambassador Larz Anderson.

== Personal life and death ==
On December 1, 1904, he married Susan Dexter in Boston, with whom he had one son.

Cooley died of tuberculosis, from which he had suffered for several years, at his summer home in Topsfield, Massachusetts at the age of 40.

New York State Assembly
Preceded by William Henderson, Jr.	New York State Assembly; Westchester County, 2nd District; 1900–1901	Succeeded by J. Mayhew Wainwright
Political offices
Preceded by Edward A. Mann	Justice of the New Mexico Territorial Supreme Court; 1909–1910	Succeeded by Edward R. Wright
