= Gary L. Clingman =

American judge

Associate Justice of the New Mexico Supreme Court
- In office April 30, 2018 – December 28, 2018
- Appointed by: Susana Martinez
- Preceded by: Edward L. Chávez
- Succeeded by: Michael E. Vigil

Judge of the 5th Judicial District Court of New Mexico
- In office 1997 – April 29, 2018

Personal details
- Born: September 21, 1951 (age 74) Hobbs, New Mexico, U.S.
- Party: Republican
- Education: University of Texas at Austin, (B.A.); Texas Tech University School of Law, (J.D.)

Gary L. Clingman (born September 21, 1951) is a former Associate Justice of the New Mexico Supreme Court.

== Education ==
Clingman received his Bachelor of Arts from the University of Texas of the Permian Basin and his Juris Doctor from Texas Tech University School of Law.

== Legal career ==
He served as an attorney for a private firm for more than 12 years.

== State judicial service ==
Clingman was appointed as a district judge in 1997. He was the Chief Judge of the Fifth Judicial District from 2006 to 2018.

== Teaching career ==
Clingman has served as an instructor and facilitator at the National Judicial College in Reno, Nevada, and is pursuing his postgraduate degree in Judicial Studies at the University of Nevada, Reno.

== Service on New Mexico Supreme Court ==
In April 2018 Clingman was one of two names submitted to the governor to fill the seat vacated by the retirement of Justice Edward L. Chávez. On April 6, 2018 Governor Susana Martinez announced his appointment to the New Mexico Supreme Court. He was sworn in on April 30, 2018. His term ended on December 31, 2018.

== Personal life ==
Clingman is a registered Republican.

Legal offices
Preceded by Edward L. Chávez	Associate Justice of the New Mexico Supreme Court; 2018	Succeeded by Michael E. Vigil
