= Joe L. Martínez =

American judge (c. 1909–1998)

Joe L. Martínez (c. 1909 – January 30, 1998) was Attorney General of New Mexico from 1949 to 1952, and a justice of the New Mexico Supreme Court from January 1, 1973, until his resignation on July 23, 1975.

Born in Quay County, New Mexico, in 1932, Martínez was an aide to Governor Clyde Tingley, and then a member of the staff of U.S. Senator Dennis Chávez. In 1944 and 1945, he served as attorney for the U.S. Senate Special Committee to Investigate the National Defense Program. After running for Congress in 1946, but failing to receive the Democratic nomination, he won election in 1948 to serve as Attorney General of New Mexico, which he did from 1949 to 1952. In 1972, he was elected to an eight-year term on the state supreme court, but resigned from the court after three years. He asserted that his resignation was due to health issues, but it came following an investigation suggesting undue influence in the writing of one of his opinions issued in 1973, which Martínez attributed to a conspiracy against him by colleagues.

Martínez died at the age of 88 in an ambulance en route to a hospital, where he was to be treated for heart failure.

Political offices
Preceded by James C. Compton	Justice of the New Mexico Supreme Court; 1973–1975	Succeeded by Dan Sosa Jr.
