= Edward A. Mann =

American judge (1867–1915)

Edward Asbury Mann (March 12, 1867 – November 19, 1915) was a New Mexico attorney, judge, and legislator who served as a justice of the New Mexico Territorial Supreme Court from 1904 to 1909.

== Early life, education, and career ==
Born in Beatrice, Nebraska, Mann attended Belle Plain College in Texas, but did not graduate. He studied law in the office of L. H. Thompson of Norton, Kansas, and gained admission to the bar in Kansas on February 14, 1891, thereafter practicing with Thompson.

He first worked in Norton, Kansas. From 1900 to 1902, he was prosecuting attorney of Scottsbluff, Nebraska. In 1903 he moved to New Mexico, locating first at Alamogordo, where for a time he was clerk in the United States land office. He later formed a partnership with Herbert B. Holt and Judge Joseph F. Bonham in Las Cruces and helped his father-in-law run The Rio Grande Republican. He practiced in Albuquerque after his term as judge ended and was elected to the state House of Representatives in 1914, serving as Republican floor leader during the 1915 session.

== Judicial career ==
In 1904 he was appointed by President Theodore Roosevelt as judge of the newly-established sixth seat of the territorial district court, which position he held until 1909. Mann served for five years as an associate justice of the Territorial Supreme Court and as the district judge for the 6th District with headquarters in Alamogordo.

In 1910, he moved to Albuquerque. Mann was a member of the lower house of the state legislature and was one of the leading Republicans in New Mexico. He was "an aggressive campaign speaker and organizer".

Mann "was one of the prominent figures in the legal and political life of New Mexico, and was a member of the state legislature, where he rendered effective service to the Republican party".

== Personal life and death ==
Mann was killed in an automobile accident three miles north of Gallup, New Mexico, when the car in which he was riding overturned on a sandy stretch of road. Mann was pinned under the car and his neck broken.

Political offices
Preceded by Newly established seat	Justice of the New Mexico Territorial Supreme Court; 1904–1912	Succeeded by Alford W. Cooley
