= Charles W. Daniels =

American judge (1943–2019)

Chief Justice of the New Mexico Supreme Court
- In office 2010–2012
- In office 2016–2017
- Succeeded by: Judith Nakamura

Justice of the New Mexico Supreme Court
- In office November 5, 2007 – December 31, 2018
- Appointed by: Bill Richardson
- Preceded by: Pamela Minzner
- Succeeded by: C. Shannon Bacon

Personal details
- Born: January 14, 1943
- Died: September 1, 2019 (aged 76)
- Party: Democratic

Charles W. Daniels (January 14, 1943 – September 1, 2019) was a justice of the New Mexico Supreme Court from 2007 to 2018. He was first recommended by the New Mexico Judicial Nominating Commission and appointed by Governor Bill Richardson in October 2007, won election in the 2008 general election, and was retained for an additional eight-year term in his 2010 retention election. In 2010, he was selected by his fellow Justices to serve as chief justice for a two-year term and was elected Chief Justice again in 2016. He retired on December 31, 2018.

Daniels was born in southeastern Arkansas, where his parents worked as sharecroppers on a 10-acre farm. When Daniels was 6, his family relocated to Albuquerque. He attended Sandia and Highland high schools before joining the Air Force. Daniels received his bachelor's degree from the University of Arizona magna cum laude, his law degree from the University of New Mexico School of Law, where he graduated first in his class, and a master of laws in trial advocacy from Georgetown University, where he was a Prettyman Fellow. Prior to his appointment to the bench, Daniels was a criminal defense attorney. He was married to fellow Albuquerque defender Randi McGinn. He died on September 1, 2019, from amyotrophic lateral sclerosis (ALS).

Daniels was an avid musician and race car enthusiast; racing vintage Formula Ford all the way up to the final year of his life. Daniels started playing guitar in pre-law school and was actively playing in local venues into 2019, in the band called The Incredible Woodpeckers.
