= Dan A. McKinnon III =

American judge (1939–2003)

Daniel Angus McKinnon III (June 27, 1939 – April 12, 2003) was a justice of the New Mexico Supreme Court from July 15, 1996, to December 6, 1996, when he resigned after defeat for reelection, and again from April 21, 1997, to December 6, 1998, when he resigned after failing to be renominated in the primary.

== Early life, education, and career ==
Born in Rochester, Minnesota, to D. Angus McKinnon Jr. and Mary Love McKinnon, the family moved to Albuquerque when McKinnon was two years old. He graduated from Albuquerque High School in 1957, and received a B.S. in biology from the University of New Mexico in 1962, followed by an LL.B. from the University of Colorado Boulder in 1965. He practiced law in New Mexico for over 30 years. He also served as a member of the Albuquerque Public Schools Board of Education from 1971 to 1977, and as a member of the governing board of Albuquerque Technical Vocational Institute.

== Judicial service ==
McKinnon was twice appointed to serve for stints as a justice of the New Mexico Supreme Court. In July 1996, Governor Gary Johnson gave McKinnon a temporary appointment to a seat on the court vacated by the retirement of Stanley F. Frost. Though Johnson was a Republican, and McKinnon was "a lifelong Democrat", they were on familiar terms as McKinnon had previously done legal work for Johnson's construction company. McKinnon served for six months as he was defeated in a bid for formal election to the seat later that year, and resigned from office on December 6, 1996.

On April 2, 1997, McKinnon was again appointed by Johnson to fill a vacancy on the court, this time occasioned by the retirement of Justice Richard E. Ransom. McKinnon did not receive the Democratic nomination for reelection to the seat, and again resigned from office following the election.

McKinnon was an "accomplished jazz drummer, and the only Supreme Court Justice who played jazz at his own swearing in".

== Personal life and death ==
McKinnon married Eleanor Arnold McKinnon, with whom he had a daughter and two sons. He died at his home in Albuquerque at the age of 63.

Political offices
Preceded by Stanley F. Frost; Richard E. Ransom	Justice of the New Mexico Supreme Court; 1996–1996; 1997–1998	Succeeded by Patricio M. Serna; Petra Jimenez Maes
