= Julie J. Vargas =

American judge (born 1968 or 1969)

Julie Vargas

Chief Justice of the New Mexico Supreme Court
- Incumbent
- Assumed office April 8, 2026
- Preceded by: David K. Thomson

Justice of the New Mexico Supreme Court
- Incumbent
- Assumed office January 25, 2021
- Appointed by: Michelle Lujan Grisham
- Preceded by: Judith Nakamura

Personal details
- Born: 1968 or 1969 (age 57–58) Old Town Albuquerque, New Mexico, U.S.
- Education: Brown University (BA); University of New Mexico (JD)

Julie J. Vargas (born 1968 or 1969) is an American attorney and jurist serving as the chief justice of the New Mexico Supreme Court since 2026. She has served concurrently as a justice of the court since 2021. She is a former judge of the New Mexico Court of Appeals.

== Early life and education ==
Vargas was born and raised in Old Town Albuquerque. She earned a Bachelor of Arts degree in history and English literature from Brown University and her Juris Doctor from the University of New Mexico School of Law.

== Career ==
Vargas worked in private practice, serving more than 20 years at the Albuquerque law firm Hunt & Davis. Since 2018 she has been an adjunct professor at the University of New Mexico School of Law.

=== Judicial career ===
==== New Mexico Court of Appeals ====
Vargas was one of three candidates sent to Governor Susana Martinez to fill the vacancy left by Cynthia Frye who retired in December 2015. Vargas was elected to the New Mexico Court of Appeals in 2016.

==== New Mexico Supreme Court ====
On December 19, 2020, Governor Michelle Lujan Grisham announced her appointment of Vargas to be a justice of the New Mexico Supreme Court to fill the vacancy left by Justice Judith Nakamura who retired on December 1, 2020. She was sworn into office on January 25, 2021.

== See also ==
- List of Hispanic and Latino American jurists

Legal offices
Preceded by Judith Nakamura	Justice of the New Mexico Supreme Court; 2021–present	Incumbent
Preceded by C. Shannon Bacon	Chief Justice of the New Mexico Supreme Court; 2026–present	Incumbent
