= Petra Jimenez Maes =

American judge (born 1947)

Chief Justice of the New Mexico Supreme Court
- In office 2012–2014

Associate Justice of the New Mexico Supreme Court
- In office December 3, 1998 – December 31, 2018
- Preceded by: Dan A. McKinnon
- Succeeded by: David K. Thomson

Personal details
- Born: October 5, 1947 (age 78) Albuquerque, New Mexico, U.S.
- Education: University of New Mexico (BA, JD)

Petra Jimenez Maes (born October 5, 1947) is a former chief justice of the New Mexico Supreme Court. She was appointed to the New Mexico Supreme Court in 1998, and was the first female Hispanic person to serve on the high court. She was elected Chief Justice for the court twice, once in 2003 and again in 2012.

Petra Jimenez Maes grew up in Albuquerque, New Mexico. Her grandparents came from Mexico, and Maes spoke Spanish as a young child. Maes received a Bachelor of Arts from the University of New Mexico and a Juris Doctor from University of New Mexico School of Law. Maes was a state district judge in Santa Fe for 17 years before joining the state Supreme Court.

Maes defeated incumbent Justice Dan A. McKinnon III to win the Democratic primary for a seat on the court in June 1998. She retired from active service on December 31, 2018.

== See also ==
- List of Hispanic and Latino American jurists
