= Clingman (surname) =

Clingman is a surname. Notable people with the surname include:

- Billy Clingman (1869–1958), American baseball player
- Gary L. Clingman (born 1951), American judge
- Thomas Lanier Clingman (1812–1897), American politician
