= New Mexico Supreme Court Building =

- U.S. National Register of Historic Places
- NM State Register of Cultural Properties
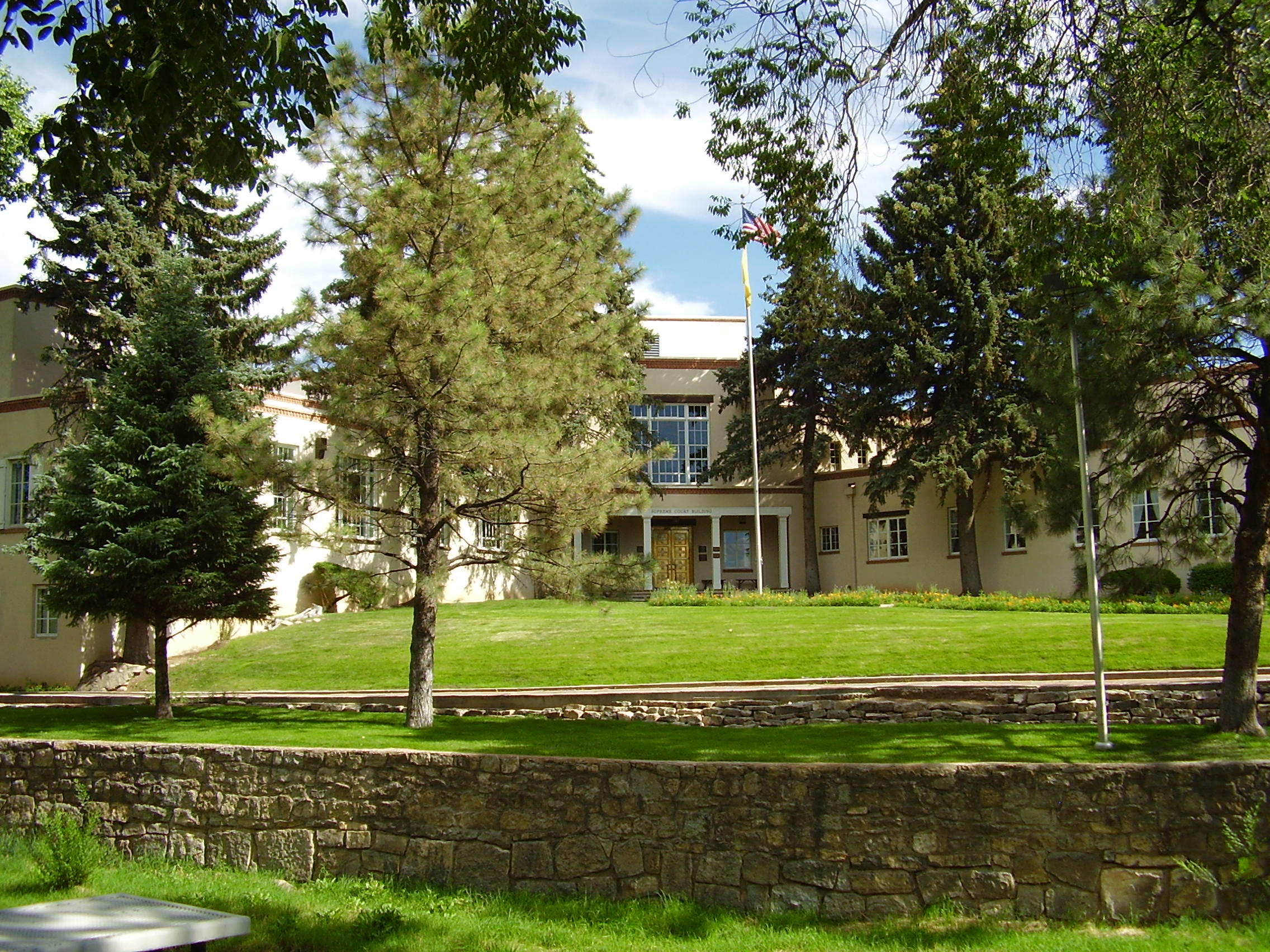

- Location within New Mexico
- Location: 237 Don Gaspar Ave. Santa Fe, New Mexico
- Coordinates: 35°41′4″N 105°56′21″W
- Area: 1 acre (0.40 ha)
- Built: 1937
- Built by: Works Progress Administration
- Architect: Gordon F. Street, W.C. Krueger, & Associates
- Architectural style: Territorial Revival
- MPS: New Deal in New Mexico MPS
- NRHP reference No.: 01001468
- NMSRCP No.: 1795

Significant dates
- Added to NRHP: January 18, 2002
- Designated NMSRCP: July 21, 2000

The New Mexico Supreme Court Building is a courthouse located in the city of Santa Fe, county of Santa Fe, in the U.S. state of New Mexico. Both the New Mexico Supreme Court and New Mexico Court of Appeals operate in the building. It was added to the National Register of Historic Places listings in Santa Fe County, New Mexico in 2002.

== History ==
Built in 1937 for $307,000, this Territorial Revival style public structure with hand-carved wood interiors was built by the Works Progress Administration. The state of New Mexico issued bonds of $175,000 to pay for its portion of the construction costs, and a tax of $2.50 was levied on each civil case docketed. During the Cold War in the 1950s, the building doubled as a fallout shelter.

== Renovations ==
The original two elevators and a third elevator added in the 1960s have been upgraded to current standards. Over the decades, piping and court seating were upgraded, as were the electrical and heating systems, water pipes, communications lines, and emergency/fire alarm system. The building now has a digital telephone system. Structural and interior design renovations have brought the building up to date.

== See also ==
- National Register of Historic Places listings in Santa Fe County, New Mexico
