= Joe Martinez (disambiguation) =

Joe Martinez (born 1975) is an American ring announcer.

Joe Martinez may also refer to:

- Joe P. Martínez (1920–1943), World War II Medal of Honor recipient
- Joe Martinez (baseball) (born 1983), Major League Baseball pitcher
- Joe L. Martínez (c. 1909–1998), Associate Justice of the New Mexico Supreme Court
