= Charles B. Larrabee =

American lawyer and judge (1926–2008)

Charles Benham Larrabee (May 19, 1926 – March 29, 2008) was an American lawyer and a justice of the New Mexico Supreme Court from July 11, 1989, until his resignation on November 7, 1989.

Born in Cedar Rapids, his father was Charles Larrabee Jr. (1902-1983), an early executive with Pan American World Airways, and Flora Mary Benham (1901-1982). Larrabee was the Great Grandson of Iowa Governor William Larrabee (1832-1912), and grew up in Highland Park, Illinois, White Plains, New York, and then spent his teenage years in Montevideo, Uruguay while is father was on assignment with Pan American. Larrabee finished his primary education at The British Schools of Montevideo in Uruguay. He served in the United States Navy in the Pacific Theater of World War II, aboard the USS North Carolina. He thereafter studied at the University of Iowa and received his law degree from the University of New Mexico School of Law in 1952. Upon graduation, Larrabee joined the Rodey Law Firm, where he eventually served as Managing Partner until his retirement in 1989.

He was appointed to the state supreme court by Governor Garrey Carruthers in June 1989, but resigned after less than four months on the court, citing "the conflict between the job and political pressure to begin campaigning".

Larrabee and his wife had two sons and three daughters. He died at his home in Albuquerque at the age of 81.

Political offices
Preceded by Tony Scarborough	Justice of the New Mexico Supreme Court; 1989–1989	Succeeded by Kenneth B. Wilson
