= Dan Sosa Jr. =

American judge (1924–2016)

Dan Sosa Jr. (November 12, 1923 – September 4, 2016) was an American judge. He was a justice of the New Mexico Supreme Court from July 22, 1975 until his retirement on September 30, 1991.

Born in an adobe house that had been built by his grandfather in Las Cruces, New Mexico, Sosa attended public schools in Las Cruces, graduating from Las Cruces Union High School in 1941. While there, he played on the school's 1941 state championship basketball team. He enrolled in college at New Mexico A&M, but left to serve in the United States Army Air Forces in World War II, flying 35 combat missions and surviving a crash landing. After the war, he returned to New Mexico A&M and received a BBA in 1947, followed by a JD from the University of New Mexico School of Law in 1951. He entered the practice of law in Las Cruces, and in 1956 was elected district attorney for the district encompassing Doña Ana, Otero and Lincoln counties.

On July 3, 1975, Governor Jerry Apodaca appointed Sosa to the state supreme court. Sosa was thereafter elected to two eight-year terms, in 1976 and 1984, becoming chief justice in 1989. He retired from the court in 1991.

Sosa died at his family home in Las Cruces after a lengthy illness, at the age of 92.

Political offices
Preceded by Joe L. Martínez	Justice of the New Mexico Supreme Court; 1975–1991	Succeeded by Stanley F. Frost
