= Briana Zamora =

American judge (born 1973 or 1974)

Justice of the New Mexico Supreme Court
- Incumbent
- Assumed office August 9, 2021
- Appointed by: Michelle Lujan Grisham
- Preceded by: Barbara J. Vigil

Personal details
- Born: March 23, 1974 (age 52) New Mexico, U.S.
- Education: New Mexico State University (BA); University of New Mexico (JD)

Briana H. Zamora (born March 23, 1974) is an American attorney and judge serving as a justice of the New Mexico Supreme Court since 2021. She is a former judge of the New Mexico Court of Appeals.

== Early life and education ==
Zamora is a graduate of Cibola High School, she earned a Bachelor of Arts in government and psychology from New Mexico State University and earned her Juris Doctor with honors from the University of New Mexico School of Law in 2000.

== Career ==
Zamora worked in private practice and as an assistant state attorney general and assistant district attorney prior to becoming a judge.

=== Judicial career ===
Zamora served as a metro court judge from 2009 to 2013. She was elected judge of the Second Judicial District Court in 2013 and served until her appointment to the court of appeals in 2018. She served as a judge of the New Mexico Court of Appeals from December 2018 to 2021.

=== New Mexico Supreme Court ===
On July 15, 2021, Governor Michelle Lujan Grisham appointed Zamora as a justice of the New Mexico Supreme Court to fill the vacancy left by the retirement of Justice Barbara J. Vigil. She was sworn in on August 9, 2021.

Legal offices
Preceded by Barbara J. Vigil	Justice of the New Mexico Supreme Court; 2021–present	Incumbent
