= Patricio M. Serna =

American judge

Chief Justice of the New Mexico Supreme Court
- In office 2001–2002

Associate Justice of the New Mexico Supreme Court
- In office December 5, 1996 – August 31, 2012
- Preceded by: Dan A. McKinnon III
- Succeeded by: Barbara J. Vigil

Personal details
- Born: August 26, 1939 (age 87) Reserve, New Mexico, U.S.
- Education: College of St. Joseph on the Rio Grande (BS); University of Denver (JD); Harvard University (LLM)

Patricio M. Serna (born August 26, 1939) is an American attorney and jurist who served as a justice of the New Mexico Supreme Court from 1996 to 2012.

== Early life and education ==
Serna was born and raised in Reserve, New Mexico. He earned a Bachelor of Science degree in Business Administration from the College of St. Joseph on the Rio Grande, a Juris Doctor from the University of Denver School of Law, and a Master of Laws from Harvard Law School. He was later awarded an honorary Doctor of Laws Degree from the University of Denver School of Law.

Serna was the first in his family to attend college.

== Career ==
Before he became a judge, Serna worked at the Equal Employment Opportunity Commission in D.C. for four years. From 1975 to 1979, he was Assistant Attorney General of New Mexico under Toney Anaya. Serna began his judicial career as District Court Judge to the First Judicial District in Santa Fe. He served from 1985 until 1996, during which he was also President of the New Mexico District Judges Association.

Serna was sworn onto the Supreme Court on December 5, 1996. He served as chief justice during 2001 and 2002. In 2002, the Hispanic National Bar Association awarded Serna the "Judge of the Year Award." Serna retired from the court on August 31, 2012.

Serna served as President/Moderator of the National Consortium on Racial and Ethnic Fairness in the Courts. In addition to his judicial duties, he has taught as an adjunct professor at Georgetown University Law Center and Columbus School of Law at Catholic University of America in Washington, D.C.
