= Judith Nakamura =

American judge (born 1960)

Chief Justice of the New Mexico Supreme Court
- In office June 7, 2017 – July 14, 2020
- Preceded by: Charles W. Daniels
- Succeeded by: Michael E. Vigil

Associate Justice of the New Mexico Supreme Court
- In office December 4, 2015 – November 30, 2020
- Appointed by: Susana Martinez
- Preceded by: Richard C. Bosson
- Succeeded by: Julie J. Vargas

Personal details
- Born: November 3, 1960 (age 65) New Mexico, U.S.
- Party: Republican
- Education: University of New Mexico (BA, JD)

Judith Nakamura (born November 3, 1960) is an American judge and former chief justice of the New Mexico Supreme Court. She was appointed to the court by New Mexico Governor Susana Martinez in 2015, and was re-elected in November 2016.

== Early life ==
Nakamura was born and raised in New Mexico. She earned a Bachelor of Arts degree from the University of New Mexico in 1983 and a Juris Doctor from the University of New Mexico School of Law in 1989.

== Career ==
After graduating from college, she served as a political director for the Republican Party of New Mexico and as a staffer for U.S. Senator Pete Domenici. After law school, Nakamura was an attorney in private practice, and for New Mexico Commissioner of Public Lands.

=== Judicial career ===
Nakamura was elected as a judge on the Bernalillo County Metropolitan Court in 1998, and served as Chief Judge of that court from 2002 to 2013. The Albuquerque Bar Association named Nakamura "Judge of the Year" in 2004. Governor Susana Martinez appointed Nakamura to New Mexico's Second Judicial District Court in 2013, and she was re-elected to a new term in 2014.

In 2015, Governor Martinez named Nakamura to the New Mexico Supreme Court to fill the vacancy created by the retirement of Richard C. Bosson. Her appointment gave the supreme court a female majority for the first time. She was sworn in on December 11, 2015. A lawsuit challenging Nakamura's appointment, because she was nominated before her predecessor had actually left office, was dismissed by the courts.

Nakamura was re-elected to a new term on the Supreme Court in November 2016, defeating her Democratic challenger Michael Vigil by 391,000 votes to 361,000 (52% to 48%). Nakamura became the first Republican woman elected to the Court in the state's history, and the first Republican since 1980.

On June 9, 2020, Nakamura announced that she would retire on August 1, but she later postponed her retirement. On December 1, Nakamura officially retired.

== Personal life ==
Nakamura is an avid balloonist and serves on the board of the Albuquerque International Balloon Fiesta, which takes place in New Mexico each fall.

== See also ==
- List of female state supreme court justices

Legal offices
Preceded by Richard C. Bosson	Justice of the New Mexico Supreme Court; 2015–2020	Succeeded by Julie J. Vargas
Preceded by Charles W. Daniels	Chief Justice of the New Mexico Supreme Court; 2017–2020	Succeeded by Michael E. Vigil
