= David K. Thomson =

American judge (born 1967 or 1968)

David Thomson

Chief Justice of the New Mexico Supreme Court
- In office April 17, 2024 – April 8, 2026
- Preceded by: C. Shannon Bacon
- Succeeded by: Julie J. Vargas

Justice of the New Mexico Supreme Court
- Incumbent
- Assumed office February 4, 2019
- Appointed by: Michelle Lujan Grisham
- Preceded by: Petra Jimenez Maes

Personal details
- Born: 1967 or 1968 (age 57–58) Santa Fe, New Mexico, U.S.
- Party: Democratic
- Education: Wesleyan University (BA); University of Denver (JD)

David K. Thomson (born 1967 or 1968) is an American attorney and jurist who has served as a justice of the New Mexico Supreme Court since 2019. He served as chief justice of the court from 2024 to 2026.

== Early life and education ==
Thomson was born and raised in Santa Fe, New Mexico. He earned a Bachelor of Arts from Wesleyan University and his Juris Doctor from the University of Denver School of Law.

== Career ==
He was admitted to the State Bar of New Mexico in 1999. After graduating law school, he worked as a sole practitioner in Santa Fe and clerked under Judge Bruce D. Black of the United States District Court for the District of New Mexico. He previously worked for more than a decade in the New Mexico Attorney General's Office, where he served as deputy attorney general and director of the litigation division.

=== State court service ===
Thomson was appointed to the District Court by Governor Bill Richardson. He served as a district court judge in the first judicial district from 2014 until his elevation to the Supreme Court.

=== New Mexico Supreme Court ===
In December 2018, Thomson was one of fourteen applicants who applied for two upcoming vacancies on the New Mexico Supreme Court. On January 11, 2019, the nominating commission submitted his name along with six others to fill the vacancies. On January 25, 2019, Governor Michelle Lujan Grisham announced her selection of Thomson to fill the vacancy left by the retirement of Petra Jimenez Maes. He was sworn in on February 4, 2019. He was sworn in as the chief justice on April 17, 2024.

== Personal life ==
Thomson is a registered Democrat.

Legal offices
Preceded by Petra Jimenez Maes	Justice of the New Mexico Supreme Court; 2019–present	Incumbent
Preceded by C. Shannon Bacon	Chief Justice of the New Mexico Supreme Court; 2024–2026	Succeeded by Julie J. Vargas
