= Harry Stowers =

American judge

Chief Justice of the New Mexico Supreme Court
- In office 1982–1989

Harry E. Stowers Jr. (April 21, 1926 – July 8, 2015) was an American jurist, lawyer, and politician.

Born in Fort Bayard, New Mexico, Stowers lived in Madrid, New Mexico and graduated from Silver City High School. During World War II, Stowers served in the United States Army. Stowers then received in bachelor's degree from University of New Mexico and his law degree from the Georgetown University Law Center. Stowers then practiced law in Albuquerque, New Mexico and was the city attorney. He also worked as a New Mexico assistant attorney general. Stowers was a Democrat. Stowers served as a New Mexico district court judge. From 1982 to 1989, Stowers served on the New Mexico Supreme Court and was chief justice. Stowers then served as mayor of Los Ranchos de Albuquerque, New Mexico and practiced law. Stowers died in Albuquerque, New Mexico.
