= Irwin S. Moise =

American judge

Chief Justice of the New Mexico Supreme Court
- In office November 13, 1969 – March 30, 1970

Associate Justice of the New Mexico Supreme Court
- In office May 16, 1959 – November 12, 1969
- Preceded by: Eugene D. Lujan
- Succeeded by: Thomas F. McKenna

Personal details
- Born: December 1, 1906 Santa Rosa, New Mexico
- Died: October 11, 1984 (aged 77) Albuquerque, New Mexico
- Education: University of Colorado Boulder; University of Michigan

Irwin Stern Moise (December 1, 1906 – October 11, 1984) was a lawyer and judge in New Mexico. He served as justice of the New Mexico Supreme Court from May 16, 1959 until his retirement on March 31, 1970, and was chief justice from November 13, 1969, to March 30, 1970.

== Early life and education ==
Irwin Moise was born on December 1, 1906 in Santa Rosa, New Mexico to Sigmund Moise and his wife, Rosa. The Moise family were German Jewish merchants and civic leaders in Santa Rosa. Irwin received his undergraduate degree from the University of Colorado Boulder in 1926, and his Bachelor of Laws (L.L.B.) from the University of Michigan in 1928.

== Career ==
Moise was admitted to the State Bar of New Mexico in 1928. He lived in Tucumcari and practiced law there from 1928-1933. From 1937 to 1943, he was a judge in New Mexico's Fourth Judicial District Court. From 1943 to 1946, he was in the U.S. Navy as a Lieutenant. He served in the North Atlantic during the Battle of the Atlantic.

He founded the Albuquerque law firm Moise & Sutin with Lewis R. Sutin in 1946. In 1959, Governor Burroughs appointed him to the New Mexico Supreme Court. He retired from the bench March 30, 1970 and returned to private practice in Albuquerque

== Personal life and death ==
Moise had a wife named Hilda.

He died at a hospital in Albuquerque on October 11, 1984, following a lengthy illness, and was buried in the Temple Albert cemetery in Fairview Memorial Park in Albuquerque.
