= Clingman Avenue Historic District =

Historic district in North Carolina, United States

- U.S. National Register of Historic Places
- U.S. Historic district
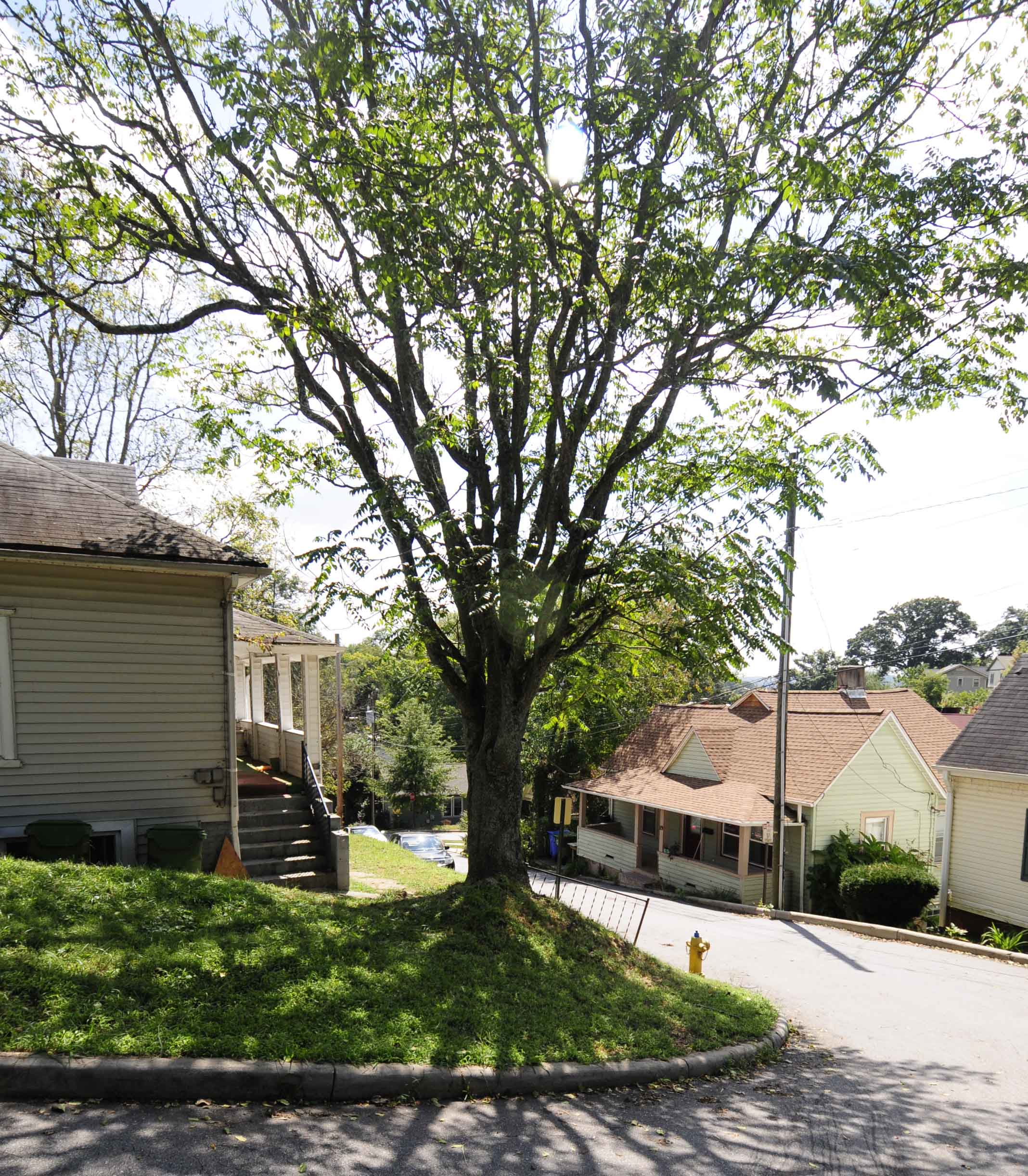
- Clingman Avenue Historic District, September 2012

- Location within North Carolina Location within the United States
- Location: Roughly along Clingman Ave., from Hillard Ave. to Haywood Ave., Asheville, North Carolina
- Coordinates: 35°35′24″N 82°33′48″W
- Area: 6.8 acres (2.8 ha)
- Built: 1919
- Architectural style: Queen Anne, Bungalow/craftsman
- NRHP reference No.: 04000583
- Added to NRHP: June 9, 2004

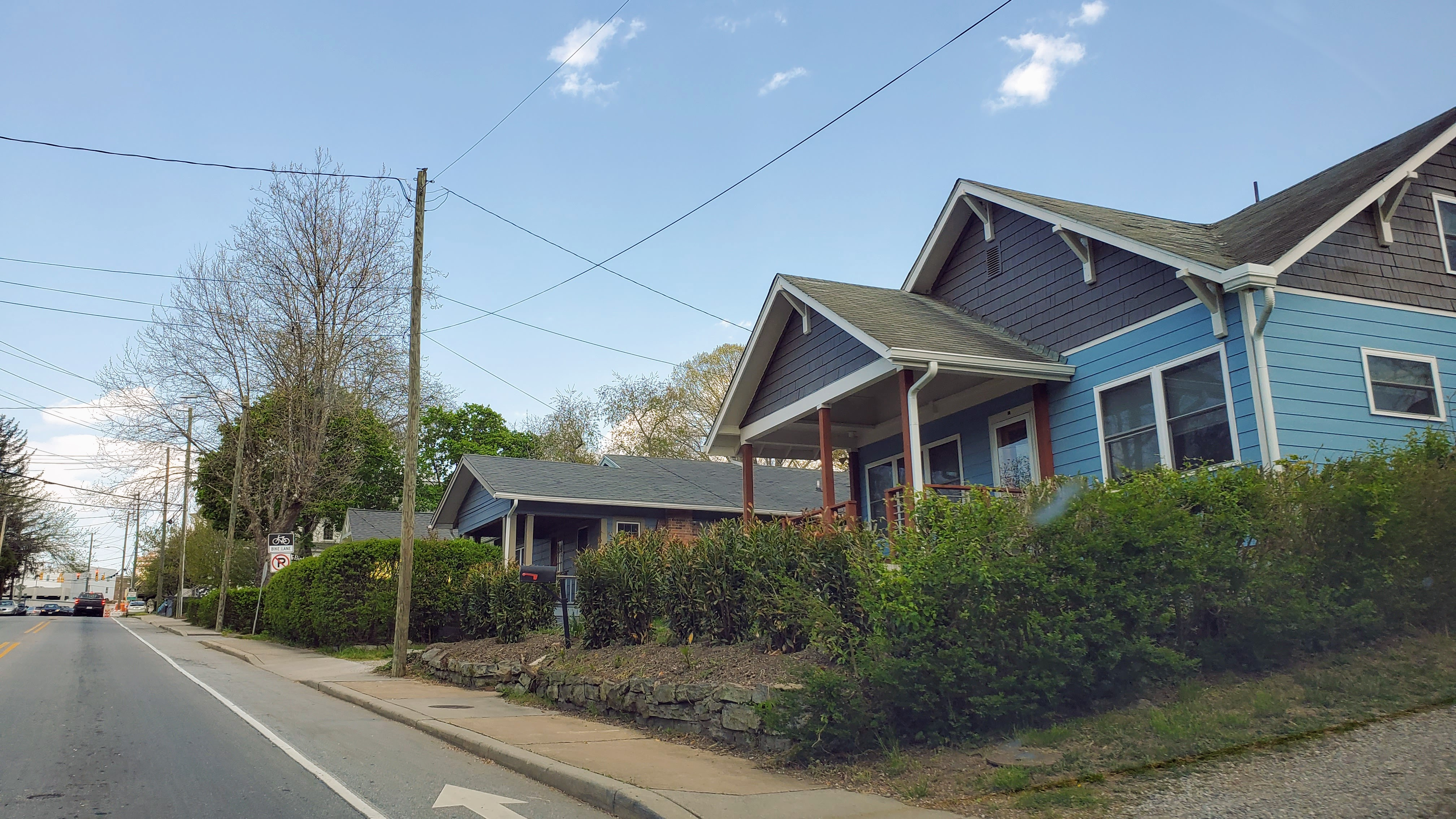
88 Clingman Avenue & Fletcher Owens House, 2021

Clingman Avenue Historic District is a national historic district located at Asheville, Buncombe County, North Carolina. The district encompassed 33 contributing buildings in a historically African-American residential section of Asheville. It was largely developed in the early-20th century and includes representative examples of Queen Anne and Bungalow style dwellings.

It was listed on the National Register of Historic Places in 2004.
