= Nora Espinoza =

Republican member of the New Mexico House of Representatives

Member of the New Mexico House of Representatives from the 59th district
- In office January 2007 – January 2017
- Preceded by: Avon Wilson
- Succeeded by: Greg Nibert

Personal details
- Party: Republican
- Education: New Covenant International University

Nora Espinoza is an American politician and a Republican member of the New Mexico House of Representatives representing District 59 from January 2007 to January 2017.

== Education ==
Born in Panama, Espinoza earned her BA in religious education from New Covenant International University in Florida. New Covenant International University is not an accredited university.

== Politics ==
Espinoza spoke out in support of an Arizona state decision to ban several books related to Latino history, which she referred to as "extremely racist and hate books", prompting a response from historian Rodolfo Acuña. In January 2015, she was selected as the New Mexico House of Representatives Education Chair.

== Elections ==
When District 59 Republican Representative Avon Wilson retired in 2006, leaving the seat open, Espinoza won the Republican Primary, held on June 6, with 1,237 votes (53.5%), and won the General election on November 7 with 4,271 votes (72%) against Democratic nominee Ellen Wedum.

In 2008 Espinoza and Wedum were both unopposed for their respective party primaries, both held on June 8, setting up a rematch; Espinoza won the November 4 General election with 6,469 votes (65.2%).

On 1 June 2010, Espinoza and Wedum both won their party primaries yet again (though this time Wedum had a competitor), setting up their third contest; Espinoza won the General election on November 2 with 5,337 votes (72%) against Wedum.

In 2012 Espinoza was unopposed for both the Republican Primary on June 5, winning with 3,096 votes and the General Election on November 6, winning with 9,903 votes.

In 2016, Espinoza ran for Secretary of State of New Mexico, but lost to Maggie Toulouse Oliver. While running for Secretary of State, she relinquished her position in the House of Representatives subsequent to the November 2016 election. Greg Nibert succeeded Espinoza as representative for the 59th District.
