= Ted Mann (disambiguation) =

Ted Mann can refer to:

- Ted Mann, an American businessman who owned a chain of movie theaters including Mann's Chinese Theater.
- Ted Mann (writer), National Lampoon Editor, actor, writer, movie and television producer
- Theodore D. Mann, longest-serving mayor of Newton, Massachusetts
- Theodore Augustine Mann, English naturalist and historian
- Theodore Mann, American theater director who co-founded New York City's Circle in the Square Theatre
- Edward "Ted" Mann, Canadian Horse Racing Hall of Fame trainer
- Ted Mann (journalist), credited with breaking the story on the Fort Lee lane closure scandal in New Jersey
