= Barbara J. Vigil =

American judge

Justice of the New Mexico Supreme Court
- In office November 6, 2012 – June 30, 2021
- Preceded by: Patricio M. Serna
- Succeeded by: Briana Zamora

Personal details
- Born: 1958 or 1959 (age 66–67) Santa Fe, New Mexico, U.S.
- Party: Democratic
- Education: New Mexico State University (BBA); University of New Mexico (JD)

Barbara J. Vigil is an American attorney and jurist who served as a justice of the New Mexico Supreme Court from 2012 to 2021.

== Early life and education ==
Vigil was born and raised in Santa Fe, New Mexico. She earned a Bachelor of Business Administration in Accounting from New Mexico State University and a Juris Doctor from the University of New Mexico School of Law.

== Career ==
Prior to being elected to the bench, Vigil operated a private practice in Santa Fe, New Mexico. She also served as a Children’s Court and state district judge before her time on the Supreme Court.

She was elected to the court on November 6, 2012, defeating temporary appointee Paul J. Kennedy and assuming office in December 2012 to fill the remainder of retired Justice Patricio M. Serna's unexpired term. Vigil was retained by voters in a retention election on November 8, 2016. Her term would have expired in 2024. In April 2021, she announced her retirement effective June 30, 2021. On August 21, 2021, Governor Lujan Grisham appointed Vigil as the Cabinet Secretary for New Mexico Children, Youth and Families, a position she held until May 1, 2023. Since then she has served on the Governor's Policy Advisory Council that was established by Executive Order 2023-020.

Legal offices
Preceded by Patricio M. Serna	Associate Justice of the New Mexico Supreme Court; 2012–2021	Succeeded by Briana Zamora
