= Richard C. Bosson =

American judge (born 1944)

Justice of the New Mexico Supreme Court
- In office 2002 – October 30, 2015

Personal details
- Born: March 19, 1944 (age 81); Baltimore, Maryland, U.S.

Richard Campbell Bosson (born March 19, 1944) is a former justice of the New Mexico Supreme Court. He was appointed in 2002 and served until October 30, 2015 when he retired. He had served as a judge on the New Mexico Court of Appeals between 1994 and 2002.

Bosson received an undergraduate degree from Wesleyan University in 1966, followed by a J.D. from the Georgetown University Law Center in 1969, and an LL.M. in judicial process from the University of Virginia School of Law in 1998.

Bosson was elected to the state supreme court to succeed Paul J. Kennedy, who had been temporarily appointed to the seat vacated by the retirement of Joseph F. Baca earlier that year.
