= C. Shannon Bacon =

American judge (born 1971 or 1972)

Shannon Bacon

Chief Justice of the New Mexico Supreme Court
- In office April 13, 2022 – April 16, 2024
- Preceded by: Michael E. Vigil
- Succeeded by: David K. Thomson

Justice of the New Mexico Supreme Court
- Incumbent
- Assumed office February 4, 2019
- Appointed by: Michelle Lujan Grisham
- Preceded by: Charles W. Daniels

Personal details
- Born: May 29, 1971 (age 55)
- Party: Democratic
- Education: Creighton University (BA, JD)

C. Shannon Bacon (born May 29, 1971) is an American attorney, legal scholar, and jurist serving as a justice of the New Mexico Supreme Court.

== Early life and education ==
Bacon was raised in North Valley, New Mexico. She earned a Bachelor of Arts from Creighton University in Omaha and a Juris Doctor from the Creighton University School of Law.

== Career ==
After graduating from law school, Bacon returned to Albuquerque, where she was admitted to the State Bar of New Mexico in 1997. She was formerly partner at a pair of Albuquerque law firms and clerked under Judge A. Joseph Alarid at the New Mexico Court of Appeals. Bacon is an adjunct professor at the University of New Mexico School of Law, where she teaches courses on evidence and trial practice.

=== Judicial service ===
==== State district court ====
Bacon was appointed a Judge of the Second Judicial District Court in 2010, where she served until her elevation to the Supreme Court.

==== New Mexico Supreme Court ====
In December 2018, Bacon was one of fourteen applicants who applied for two upcoming vacancies on the Supreme Court. On January 11, 2019 the Nominating Commission submitted her name along with six others to fill the vacancies. On January 25, 2019 Governor Michelle Lujan Grisham announced her pick of Bacon to fill the vacancy left by the retirement of Charles W. Daniels. She was sworn in on February 4, 2019. She was elected to serve as the next chief justice of the New Mexico Supreme Court and sworn in on April 13, 2022. and served until April 16, 2024, when she was succeeded by David K. Thomson.

== Personal ==
Bacon is a lesbian. In 2022, she became the first openly LGBT member to serve as the Chief Justice of the New Mexico Supreme Court.

== See also ==
- List of LGBT jurists in the United States
- List of LGBT state supreme court justices in the United States

Legal offices
Preceded by Charles W. Daniels	Justice of the New Mexico Supreme Court; 2019–present	Incumbent
Preceded by Michael E. Vigil	Chief Justice of the New Mexico Supreme Court; 2022–2024	Succeeded by David K. Thomson
