= Edward L. Chávez =

American judge

Edward L. Chávez (born October 15, 1957) is a former justice and chief justice of the New Mexico Supreme Court.

Chávez was born in Santa Fe. He was appointed to the Supreme Court by Governor Bill Richardson and served from March 10, 2003 to March 2018. Chávez graduated from Eastern New Mexico University in 1978 with a B.B.A. degree. He earned his Juris Doctor in 1981 from the University of New Mexico School of Law.

Chávez has served as President of the Legal Aid Society of Albuquerque, Chairman of the UNM Mental Health Center and Chairman of the Supreme Court Disciplinary Board. In addition, he was a member of numerous civic and professional organizations. He has also taught at the National Institute for Trial Advocacy, and UNM School of Law as an Adjunct Instructor. Chávez is listed in Best Lawyers in America, and he is a Fellow in both the American College of Trial Lawyers and the International Academy of Trial Lawyers.

On 19 December 2013 he wrote a unanimous opinion in Griego v. Oliver case (regarding same-sex marriages in New Mexico).

He retired from the court in March 2018.

== See also ==
- List of Hispanic and Latino American jurists
