= Michael E. Vigil =

American judge (born 1951)

Michael Vigil

Chief Justice of the New Mexico Supreme Court
- In office July 15, 2020 – April 13, 2022
- Preceded by: Judith Nakamura
- Succeeded by: C. Shannon Bacon

Justice of the New Mexico Supreme Court
- Incumbent
- Assumed office December 31, 2018
- Preceded by: Gary L. Clingman

Personal details
- Born: Michael Edward Vigil; May 23, 1951 (age 74); Santa Fe, New Mexico, U.S.
- Political party: Democratic
- Children: 4
- Education: College of Santa Fe (BA); Georgetown University (JD)

Michael Edward Vigil (born May 23, 1951) is an American attorney and jurist serving as a justice of the New Mexico Supreme Court. He formerly was a judge on the New Mexico Court of Appeals.

== Early life and education ==
Vigil was born in Santa Fe, New Mexico. He graduated from the Santa Fe University of Art and Design (formerly College of Santa Fe) in 1973 with a Bachelor of Arts in political science and a history minor. He received his Juris Doctor from the Georgetown University Law Center in 1976.

== Career ==
Vigil began his legal career in 1976 as a staff attorney for the New Mexico Court of Appeals. He entered private practice in 1979, focusing on personal injury and medical malpractice. He was in private practice until his appointment to the Court of Appeals.

=== State judicial service ===
Vigil was appointed to the New Mexico Court of Appeals in 2003 by Democratic Governor Bill Richardson. He was elected in 2004 and re-elected in 2012 to a term set to end December 31, 2020. Vigil was elected by his peers in 2015 to a two-year term as chief judge. His service on the appeals court terminated upon his election to the Supreme Court.

=== New Mexico Supreme Court ===
Vigil was previously considered in 2015 for appointment to the New Mexico Supreme Court after the retirement of Richard C. Bosson. On November 6, 2018, Vigil was elected to the court, defeating incumbent Gary L. Clingman by a margin of 19%. His term began on January 1, 2019. On July 15, 2020, Vigil was sworn in as chief justice of the Supreme Court.

== Personal ==
Vigil has four children and three grandchildren.

Legal offices
Preceded by Gary L. Clingman	Justice of the New Mexico Supreme Court; 2019–present	Incumbent
Preceded by Judith Nakamura	Chief Justice of the New Mexico Supreme Court; 2020–2022	Succeeded by C. Shannon Bacon
