= Gene E. Franchini =

American judge

Chief Justice of the New Mexico Supreme Court
- In office 1997–1998

Justice of the New Mexico Supreme Court
- In office November 30, 1990 – December 31, 2002

Gene Edward Franchini (May 19, 1935 – November 4, 2009) was an American lawyer and judge from New Mexico, and justice of the New Mexico Supreme Court.

== Biography ==
Franchini was born in Albuquerque, New Mexico to Mario and Lena Franchini whose parents immigrated from Italy. He attended Loyola University of the South before receiving his Bachelor of Business Administration from the University of New Mexico (1957). Franchini subsequently earned an Juris Doctor from Georgetown University Law Center, and his LL.M from the University of Virginia. He returned to Albuquerque to practice law in 1960. In 1967 he was one of Chicano activist Reies Tijerina Lopez's defense lawyers.

Franchini was appointed judge in the Second Judicial District in 1975, but resigned to 1981 to protest mandatory sentencing legislation, which he strongly opposed. In 1990 he was elected as a Democrat to the New Mexico Supreme Court, serving until 2002 (including serving as Chief Justice 1997-8).

Franchini died in 2009 of a heart attack in Albuquerque while giving an annual lecture on ethics and the role of the judge to University of New Mexico law students. He was survived by Glynnie, his wife of forty years, and four children.

== Legacy ==
The mock trial program in New Mexico is named in his honor. Franchini was highly supportive of the program during his lifetime. The National High School Mock Trial Championship awards a Justice Gene Franchini Golden Gavel Award in honor of his contributions.
