= Michelle Lujan Grisham =

Governor of New Mexico since 2019

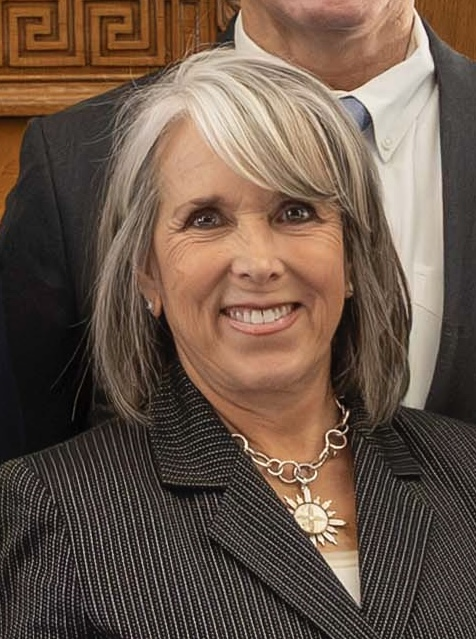
- Lujan Grisham in 2026

32nd Governor of New Mexico
- Incumbent
- Assumed office January 1, 2019
- Lieutenant: Howie Morales
- Preceded by: Susana Martinez

Member of the U.S. House of Representatives from New Mexico's 1st district
- In office January 3, 2013 – January 1, 2019
- Preceded by: Martin Heinrich
- Succeeded by: Deb Haaland

Member of the Bernalillo County Commission from the 1st district
- In office 2011–2012
- Preceded by: Alan Armijo
- Succeeded by: Simon Kubiak

Secretary of Health of New Mexico
- In office August 2004 – June 2007
- Governor: Bill Richardson
- Preceded by: Patricia Montoya
- Succeeded by: Alfredo Vigil

Personal details
- Born: Michelle Lynn Lujan; October 24, 1959 (age 67) Los Alamos, New Mexico, U.S.
- Party: Democratic
- Spouses: Gregory Grisham (m. 1982; died 2004); Manuel Cordova (m. 2022)
- Children: 2
- Education: University of New Mexico (BA, JD)
- Website: Office website
- Lujan Grisham's voice Lujan Grisham on the 2013 United States federal government shutdown. Recorded October 8, 2013

Michelle Lynn Lujan Grisham (/ˈluːhɑːn ˈɡrɪʃəm/ LOO-hahn GRISH-əm; née Lujan; born October 24, 1959) is an American lawyer and politician serving as the 32nd governor of New Mexico since 2019. A member of the Democratic Party, Lujan Grisham previously served as the U.S. representative for New Mexico's 1st congressional district from 2013 to 2019.

Lujan Grisham served as the state secretary of health from 2004 to 2007 and as a Bernalillo County commissioner from 2010 to 2012. She was elected to the U.S. House of Representatives in 2012, defeating Janice Arnold-Jones. In 2016, Lujan Grisham was selected as the chair of the Congressional Hispanic Caucus. She won the Democratic nomination for governor of New Mexico in 2018 and defeated Republican Steve Pearce on November 6, 2018. She was reelected in 2022.

== Early life and education ==
Michelle Lynn Lujan was born in Los Alamos, New Mexico and grew up in Santa Fe. Her father, Llewellyn Eugene "Buddy" Lujan, was a dentist into his eighties until he died in March 2011. Her mother, Sonja Lee (née Jackson), was a homemaker originally from Indiana who died in 2022. Her sister Kimberly was diagnosed with a brain tumor at the age of two and died at 21.

Lujan Grisham's Hispano ancestors have resided in New Mexico for 12 generations. In an interview, she said most of her family was from Spain's Basque region and "were likely Jewish and fleeing persecution". She is part of the prominent Lujan political family in New Mexico, many of whose members have served in elected and appointed positions in government.

Lujan graduated from St. Michael's High School. She received a Bachelor of Arts in university studies from the University of New Mexico in 1981, where she was a work-study student in the engineering department and was a member of the Delta Delta Delta sorority. In 1982, she married Gregory Alan Grisham. She also worked as a technical writing intern for the Westinghouse Electric Corporation. In 1987, Lujan Grisham earned a Juris Doctor from the University of New Mexico School of Law.

== Early political career ==
Lujan Grisham served as director of the New Mexico Aging and Long-Term Services Department under Bruce King, Gary Johnson, and Bill Richardson. During Richardson's tenure, the position was elevated to the state cabinet level. In 2004, he named Lujan Grisham as New Mexico Secretary of Health and she served in the position until 2007.

Lujan Grisham was later elected to the Bernalillo County Commission, serving from 2010 to 2012.

== U.S. House of Representatives ==
=== Elections ===
==== 2008 ====
Lujan Grisham resigned as Secretary of Health in order to run for the United States House of Representatives in the 2008 elections, losing in the Democratic primary to Martin Heinrich, who won with 44% of the vote. New Mexico Secretary of State Rebecca Vigil-Giron ranked second with 25% and Lujan Grisham ranked third with 24%.

==== 2010 ====
Lujan Grisham was elected to the Bernalillo County Commission, serving from 2010 to 2012. In August 2012, she resigned to focus on her congressional race.

==== 2012 ====
Lujan Grisham sought the Democratic nomination for the House again in 2012 after Heinrich decided to run for the United States Senate. She won the nomination, defeating Marty Chavez and Eric Griego. She defeated Janice Arnold-Jones, a former member of the New Mexico House of Representatives, in the November general election, 59%–41%.

==== 2014 ====
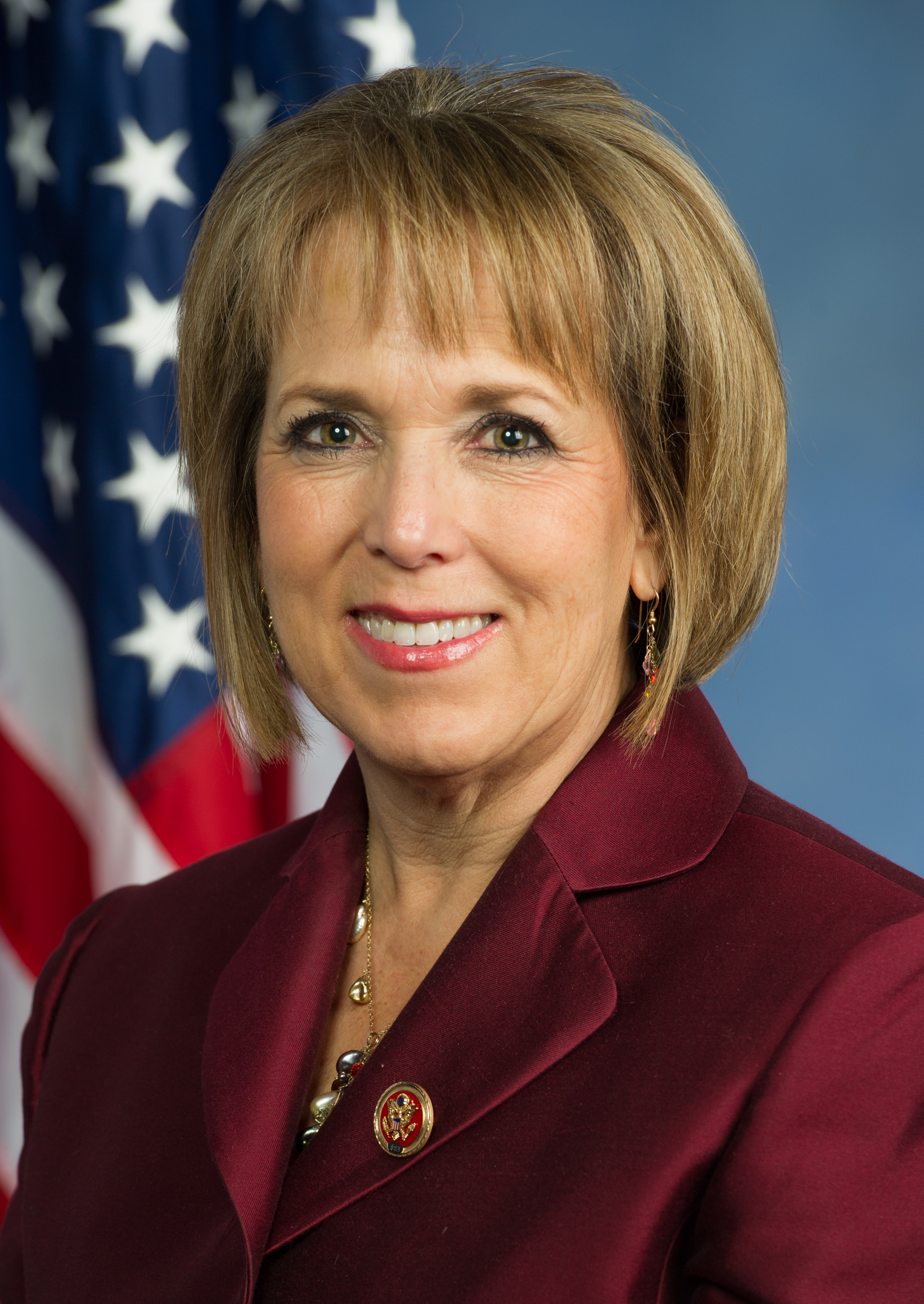
Grisham during the 113th Congress

Lujan Grisham defeated Republican Mike Frese in the 2014 elections, 59% to 41%.

==== 2016 ====
In 2016, Lujan Grisham defeated Republican Richard Priem, receiving 179,380 votes (65.1%) to Priem's 96,061 (34.9%).

=== Tenure ===
Lujan Grisham was sworn in as a member of Congress on January 3, 2013. In 2016, she was one of nine members of Congress who took a trip to Baku who were later found to have been secretly funded by the government of Azerbaijan; she had to turn over gifts the country gave her to the House Clerk after an ethics investigation. Both the Office of Congressional Ethics and House Ethics Committee found lawmakers and aides had no way of knowing the trip was being funded improperly.

Also in 2016, Lujan Grisham was selected as the chair of the Congressional Hispanic Caucus.

Lujan Grisham resigned her House seat as of December 31, 2018, to assume the governorship of New Mexico the following day.

==== Committee assignments ====
- Committee on Agriculture
  - United States House Agriculture Subcommittee on Nutrition
  - United States House Agriculture Subcommittee on Biotechnology, Horticulture, and Research (Ranking Member)
- Committee on the Budget

==== Caucuses ====
- Congressional Hispanic Caucus (Chair)
- Congressional Native American Caucus
- Congressional Caucus for Women's Issues

== Governor of New Mexico ==
=== Elections ===
==== 2018 ====
On December 13, 2016, one week after Tom Udall announced he would not run for governor of New Mexico, Lujan Grisham became the first person to announce her candidacy to succeed Susana Martinez, who was prohibited from running because of term limits. On June 5, 2018, she won the Democratic primary to become the party's nominee. On November 6, she was elected governor, defeating the Republican nominee, U.S. Representative Steve Pearce, with 57.2% of the vote.

==== 2022 ====
On November 8, 2022, Lujan Grisham was reelected to a second term, defeating Republican nominee Mark Ronchetti with 52% of the vote.

=== Tenure ===
Lujan Grisham was sworn in on January 1, 2019. In September 2019, she announced a plan to make public universities in New Mexico tuition-free to state residents.

On January 29, 2019, Lujan Grisham signed an executive order calling for New Mexico to join the United States Climate Alliance and to reduce its greenhouse gas emissions by 45% below 2005 levels by 2030. This executive order also called for the state to develop comprehensive regulations to reduce methane emissions from the oil and gas sector, and for state agencies to work with the legislature to increase the state's renewable portfolio standard.

In March 2019, Lujan Grisham signed New Mexico's Energy Transition Act. The legislation transitions the state's electricity sector away from coal and natural gas and toward a renewable economy, requiring New Mexico's electricity to be 50% renewable by 2030 and 100% from zero-carbon sources by 2045. She called the legislation "a promise to future generations of New Mexicans."

On September 5, 2020, Lujan Grisham was named a co-chair of the Biden-Harris Transition Team, which was planning Joe Biden's presidential transition. In November, Lujan Grisham was named a candidate for United States Secretary of Health and Human Services in the Biden administration. On December 3, 2020, she was elected chair of the Democratic Governors Association for 2021, having served as vice chair in 2020.

In May 2021, Lujan Grisham and 12 others were named as defendants in a lawsuit filed on behalf of the former executive director of the New Mexico Educational Retirement Board, alleging that she was not compensated at the same rate as her male counterparts. In August 2021, Lujan Grisham signed an executive order joining Biden's "30x30" land goal.

On September 8, 2023, Lujan Grisham issued an emergency order restricting carrying firearms in Albuquerque for 30 days. The order has been criticized by Republicans, civil rights advocates, some Democrats, and gun safety advocates as unconstitutional. On September 13, Judge David H. Urias issued a temporary restraining order blocking her order until October 3, when a hearing was held. On October 3, Urias extended the preliminary hold while he considers blocking the restrictions indefinitely.

In April 2025, Lujan Grisham signed into law Senate Bill 16, which allows unaffiliated or independent voters to participate in major-party primaries without changing their registration. The reform, which was broadly opposed by New Mexico Republicans and a few Democrats, takes effect in 2026 and aims to expand access for the state's growing number of independent voters (approximately 23% as of 2025), increasing voter participation and reducing partisan polarization.

== Political positions ==
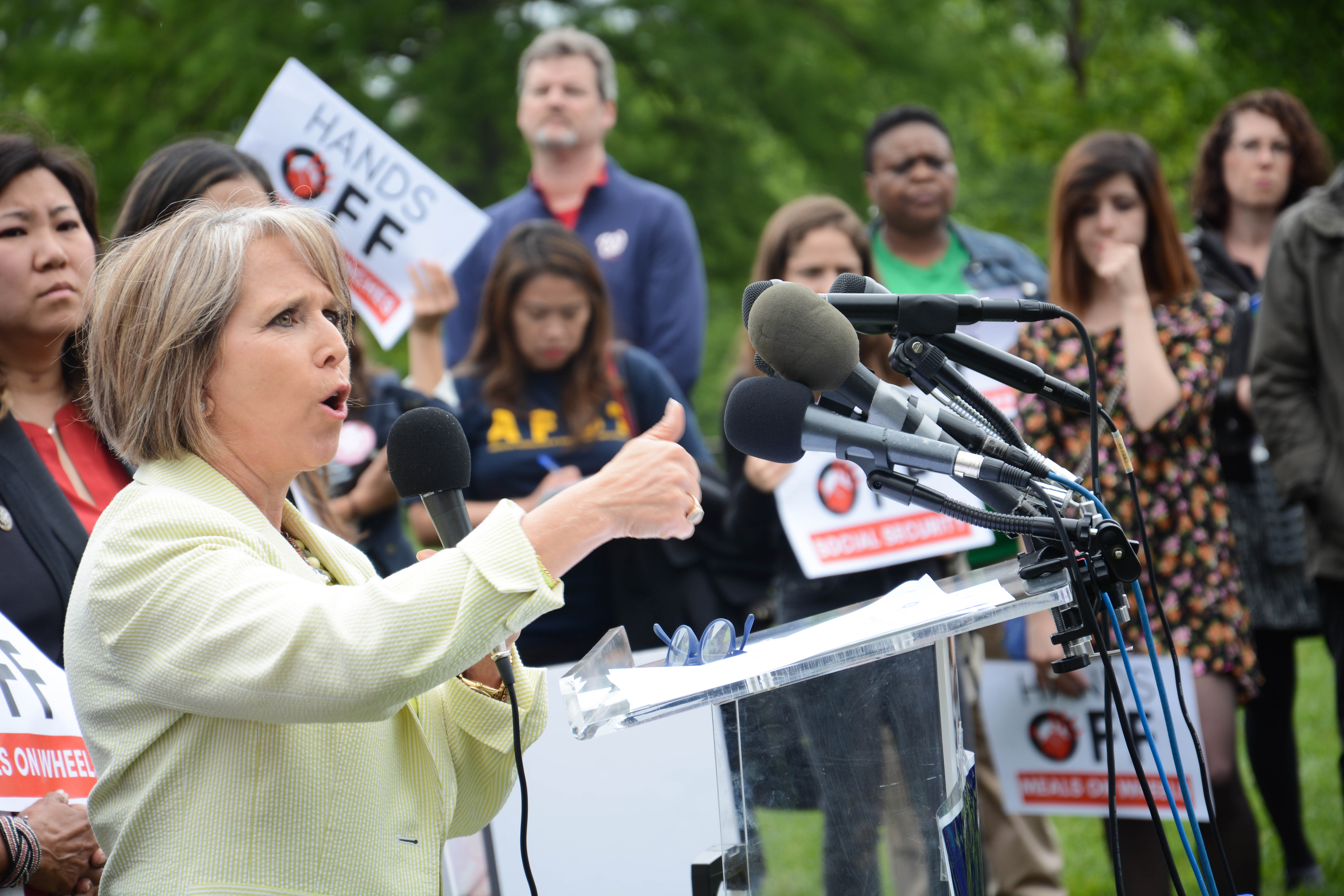
Michelle Lujan Grisham speaking at a budget rally, May 2017

=== Abortion ===
Lujan Grisham supports abortion rights.

In 1969, the New Mexico Legislature passed a law that made it a felony for someone to provide a woman with an abortion unless it was needed to save a woman's life, or because her pregnancy was a result of rape or incest. The U.S. Supreme Court's decision in 1973's Roe v. Wade barred states from regulating abortion in the first trimester; consequently, New Mexico's 1969 abortion law became unenforceable.

In her 2019 State of the State address, Lujan Grisham expressed her support for repealing the 1969 law, saying, "The old criminal abortion law of this state, only one of nine left in the entire country, must go. Bring me that bill and I will sign it." On March 3, 2019, she published an op-ed in support of repeal. Repeal legislation passed the New Mexico House of Representatives, but was defeated in the State Senate on March 14, 2019, by a vote of 24–18. After the Senate vote, Lujan Grisham said, "This old, outdated statute criminalizing health care providers is an embarrassment. That removing it was even a debate, much less a difficult vote for some senators, is inexplicable to me."

In 2021, the New Mexico legislature passed SB10, a repeal of the 1969 abortion law. The bill was approved in the House by a 40–30 margin and in the Senate by a 25–17 margin. Lujan Grisham signed it into law on February 26, 2021. As of June 2025, abortion is legal in New Mexico at all stages of pregnancy.

=== Guns ===
Lujan Grisham was a co-sponsor of the Assault Weapon Ban, H. R. 4269, introduced on December 12, 2015.

=== Israel ===
Lujan Grisham is a strong supporter of Israel. She condemned the United Nations Security Council's criticism of Israel's settlement building in the occupied Palestinian territories.

=== Marijuana legalization ===
In 2019, after a bill to legalize recreational marijuana passed the New Mexico House but not the Senate, Lujan Grisham announced that she would add the issue to the legislative agenda for the upcoming year. She also announced the formation of a working group to determine the best path forward for legalization during the 2020 session. In 2021, after the legislature failed to legalize cannabis during the regular session, Lujan Grisham called a special session so that lawmakers could pass a legalization bill. She signed the bill into law on April 12, 2021.

=== Minimum wage ===
In 2015, Lujan Grisham co-sponsored legislation that would raise the federal minimum wage to $12/hour.

=== 2024 presidential election ===
After Joe Biden dropped out of the 2024 presidential election and Kamala Harris became the front-runner for the Democratic nomination, Lujan Grisham endorsed Harris and said she was confident that Harris would win New Mexico in the Electoral College, which she did, by six percentage points.

== Personal life ==
Lujan Grisham married Gregory Grisham in 1982. They were married until his death from a brain aneurysm in 2004 at the age of 45. The couple had two daughters. Lujan Grisham filed a wrongful death suit against her husband's physician, but the lawsuit was dropped.

Lujan Grisham married Manuel Cordova, a small business owner from Albuquerque, on May 21, 2022, with Vice President of the United States Kamala Harris officiating the wedding. The wedding was postponed due to COVID-19 restrictions. The couple had been together since 2012.

== Sexual battery settlement ==
In December 2019, a former campaign staffer and spokesperson, James Hallinan, accused Lujan Grisham of sexual battery. According to Hallinan, the incident took place during a staff meeting in 2018. By his account, Lujan Grisham poured a bottle of water on his crotch and then slapped and grabbed his crotch through his pants while laughing. He said the incident happened "in front of everybody".

In April 2021, it was publicized that Lujan Grisham and her gubernatorial campaign, while denying the allegations, had reached a $62,500 settlement with the law firm representing Hallinan. The payment was made in monthly installments of $12,500 from November 2020 to March 2021. Her political committee paid another $87,500 over six months, bringing the total payout to $150,000.

== Ethics controversy ==
In February 2021, an investigative team from Albuquerque TV station KOB found reports of more than $6,500 worth of groceries bought from the governor's contingency fund, which is intended for travel or official functions to promote the state. According to public receipts through an Inspection of Public Records Act request, the items include anything from "laundry detergent to Wagyu beef, tuna steaks, top sirloin and hundreds of dollars in alcohol purchases."

== See also ==
- Demographics of the Democratic Party (United States) — Hispanic and Latino Americans
- List of female governors in the United States
- List of Hispanic and Latino Americans in the United States Congress
- List of minority governors and lieutenant governors in the United States
- Women in the United States House of Representatives

U.S. House of Representatives
Preceded by Martin Heinrich	Member of the U.S. House of Representatives from New Mexico's 1st congressional district 2013–2018	Succeeded by Deb Haaland
Preceded by Linda Sánchez	Chair of the Congressional Hispanic Caucus; 2017–2019	Succeeded by Joaquín Castro
Party political offices
Preceded by Gary King	Democratic nominee for Governor of New Mexico; 2018, 2022	Succeeded by Deb Haaland
Preceded by Phil Murphy	Chair of the Democratic Governors Association; 2020–2021	Succeeded by Roy Cooper
Political offices
Preceded by Susana Martinez	Governor of New Mexico; 2019–present	Incumbent
U.S. order of precedence (ceremonial)
Preceded by JD Vance as Vice President	Order of precedence of the United States; Within New Mexico	Succeeded by Mayor of city in which event is held
Preceded by JD Vance as Vice President	Order of precedence of the United States; Within New Mexico	Succeeded by Otherwise Mike Johnson as Speaker of the House
Preceded by Kevin Stitt as Governor of Oklahoma	Order of precedence of the United States; Outside New Mexico	Succeeded by Katie Hobbs as Governor of Arizona
