= New Mexico Supreme Court =

Highest court in the U.S. state of New Mexico

Coordinates: 35.684346°N 105.93981°W

- Seal of the New Mexico Supreme Court
- Interactive map of New Mexico Supreme Court
- Established: 1841
- Jurisdiction: New Mexico, United States
- Location: Santa Fe, New Mexico
- Authorized by: New Mexico Constitution
- Appeals to: Supreme Court of the United States
- Judge term length: 8 years
- Number of positions: 5
- Website: Official website

Chief Justice
- Currently: Julie J. Vargas
- Since: April 8, 2026
- Lead position ends: April 8, 2028
- Jurist term ends: December 31, 2028

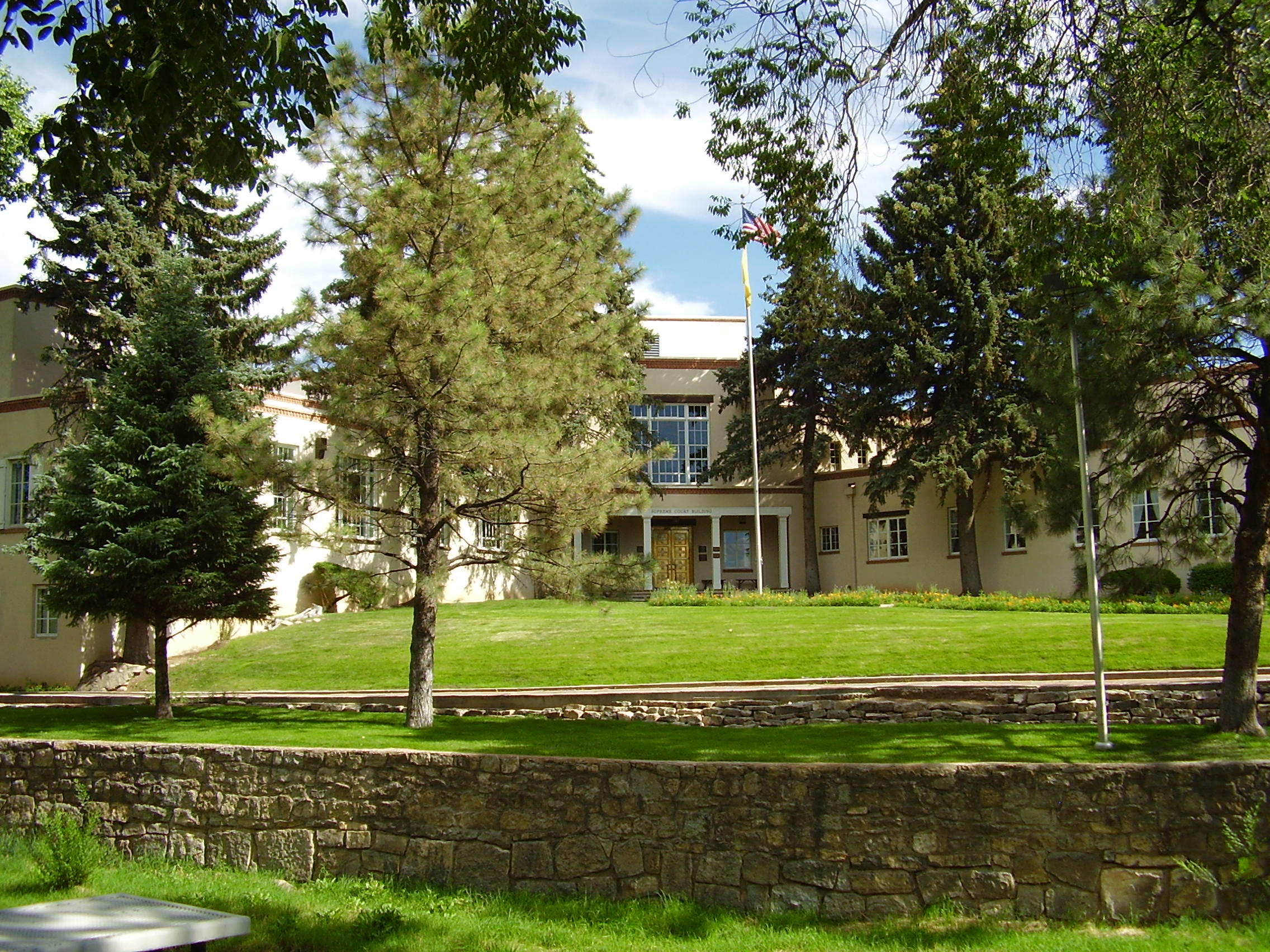
New Mexico Supreme Court Building

The New Mexico Supreme Court (Spanish: Corte Suprema de Nuevo México) is the highest court in the U.S. state of New Mexico. It is established and its powers defined by Article VI of the New Mexico Constitution. It is primarily an appellate court which reviews civil and criminal decisions of New Mexico's trial courts of general jurisdiction and certain specialized legislative courts, only having original jurisdiction in a limited number of actions. It currently resides in the New Mexico Supreme Court Building in Santa Fe.

The court's five justices are chosen by statewide election, or appointed by the governor if to fill a seat that has become vacant mid-term; the justices in turn choose who among them will serve as chief justice. The second time they face popular election, they must first pass review by a judicial standards committee, and then face a retention election in which they must receive at least 57% of the vote.

== History ==
=== New Mexico Territorial Supreme Court ===
In 1846, what is now New Mexico was seized by the United States from Mexico at the outset of the Mexican–American War. Brigadier General Stephen Watts Kearny was installed as military governor at Santa Fe, and appointed Joab Houghton the first Chief Justice of New Mexico, in the provisional civilian government, with Antonio J. Otero and Charles Beaubien also serving as justices. Houghton served until 1850, when the New Mexico Territory was organized by one of the five acts of United States Congress collectively known as the Compromise of 1850.

Section 10 of the 1850 Act formally established the supreme court for the territory. The court consisted of a chief justice and two associate justices (later increased to five), who were appointed to four-year terms by the president of the United States and confirmed by the U.S. Senate. The court met in a building designed by Chief Justice Houghton, which served as the courthouse until 1937.

The justices were also to each preside over a trial court within one of the territory's three judicial districts. This resulted in a situation then common among the territorial courts, in which the Supreme Court justices would often preside over an appeal from a decision that one of them had handed down; Congress later required disqualification of the justice. The appellate and original jurisdiction of the Territorial Supreme Court was to be defined by subsequent law of the territory, though the 1850 Act provided that writs of error and appeals were to be allowed in all cases from final decisions of the District courts. The justices were given the same power to grant writs of habeas corpus as judges of the United States in the District of Columbia.

=== New Mexico Supreme Court ===
New Mexico became a state on January 6, 1912, and the New Mexico Supreme Court was thereafter governed by Article VI of the New Mexico Constitution. On January 10, the Territorial Supreme Court terminated its existence, and the new state Supreme Court justices took their oaths. In 1915 the New Mexico legislature placed the state's collection of legal publications that had been used by government employees under the management of the Supreme Court.

In 1937, the New Mexico Supreme Court, including the state law library, moved into its own building, the New Mexico Supreme Court Building.

In 1951, Governor Ed Mechem voluntarily adopted a merit selection system, by the use of a judicial nominating committee that would recommend candidates for appointment. Mechem’s system was used by all subsequent governors, until the appointment process was changed by constitutional amendment.

From 1911 until 1988, New Mexico had been one of a decreasing number of states using an all-partisan election system to select Supreme Court justices. On November 8, 1988, voters approved Amendment Six, which required that all justices be thereafter subject to non-partisan retention elections following their first term chosen by partisan election. The new system entered into effect on January 1, 1989.

Amendment Ten, which was approved with little public controversy in 1994, increased the percentage required for retention from a majority to 57%. In 1997, two District Court judges who lost their 1996 retention elections, along with individuals who had voted to retain them, challenged the constitutionality of the 57% requirement as invalid under the Equal Protection Clause of the Fourteenth Amendment to the United States Constitution, because it diluted the votes of those who favored the retention of incumbent judges. The New Mexico Supreme Court granted certiorari and conducted oral arguments, but after a forty-minute deliberation ruled from the bench to dismiss the writ of mandamus.

A legal reform interest group called the New Mexico Alliance for Legal Reform has become active in New Mexico judicial campaigns.

In May, 2006, the New Mexico Supreme Court announced that it would assume oversight of pro bono legal work for the poor by setting up committees in court districts across New Mexico. This had been recommended by a report on equal access to justice that was authored by a court-appointed panel.

== Powers and jurisdiction ==
The Supreme Court hears appeals from lower courts, typically those on appeal from the New Mexico Court of Appeals. The Supreme Court also hears direct appeals from trial courts in the three circumstances:

- Criminal cases in which the death penalty or life imprisonment is sought,
- Appeals from the Public Regulation Commission, and
- Cases involving the writ of habeas corpus.

The Supreme Court also has jurisdiction over challenged elections, and exercises supervision over all the courts of the state, including matters of attorney and judge discipline.

== Court composition and selection ==
The New Mexico Supreme Court consists of five justices. They must be at least thirty-five years old, have actively practiced law for at least ten years, and have resided in New Mexico for at least three years immediately prior to taking the bench.

A justice is chosen for their first term by statewide, partisan election. Thereafter, that justice is subject to reelection every eight years by a non-partisan retention election. The justice must file a declaration of candidacy, and then receive 57% of the vote to be retained. If the voters do not choose to retain the justice, the seat is filled by the appointment process until the next general election.

=== Appointments ===
When a vacancy on the court occurs, a bi-partisan judicial nominating commission has thirty days to solicit, accept, and evaluate applications for the seat and then submit a list of qualified applicants to the governor. The governor then has thirty days to make an appointment.

The judicial appointee serves until the next general election, at which time a partisan election is held. The winning candidate serves out the remainder of the original term, at which time they are subject to a nonpartisan retention election requiring a 57% affirmative vote to remain on the court. If the justice is not retained, they must vacate office on the following January 1, and the governor must again fill the vacancy by the ordinary procedures of appointment.

Whenever the governor fails to make an appointment within the prescribed thirty-day period, the Chief Justice fills the vacancy from the judicial nominating commission’s list of candidates.

=== Chief Justice ===
Every two years, the Supreme Court justices choose by majority vote one of their number who has not been appointed to the court to serve as Chief Justice. In the absence of the Chief Justice, the senior most justice present exercises those powers, with seniority being determined by the length of present continuous service on the court. If a vacancy occurs before the end of the two-year term, the justices determine an eligible justice to serve by majority vote for the remainder of that term.

The Chief Justice has the power to, when necessary, designate any Supreme Court justice or District Court judge to sit on the Court of Appeals, or designate any judge of the Court of Appeals to sit on the Supreme Court or on a District Court. Additionally, whenever the governor fails to make an appointment to any court within the prescribed thirty-day period, the Chief Justice fills the vacancy from the judicial nominating commission’s list of candidates.

== Justices ==
=== Current justices ===
| Name | Born | Start | Chief | Term ends (Note: Terms end on December 31.) | Party | Appointed by | Law school |
|---|---|---|---|---|---|---|---|
| Julie J. Vargas, Chief Justice | 1968 or 1969 (age 57–58) | January 25, 2021 | 2026–present | 2028 | Democratic | Michelle Lujan Grisham (D) | UNM |
| Michael E. Vigil | May 23, 1951 (age 75) | December 31, 2018 | 2020–2022 | 2030 | Democratic | —N/a (Note: Took office after being elected in a partisan election.) | Georgetown |
| C. Shannon Bacon | May 29, 1971 (age 55) | February 4, 2019 | 2022–2024 | 2034 | Democratic | Michelle Lujan Grisham (D) | Creighton |
| David K. Thomson | 1968 or 1969 (age 57–58) | February 4, 2019 | 2024–2026 | 2034 | Democratic | Michelle Lujan Grisham (D) | Denver |
| Briana Zamora | March 23, 1974 (age 52) | August 9, 2021 | – | 2032 | Democratic | Michelle Lujan Grisham (D) | UNM |
