= Electoral history of Bill Richardson =

List of elections featuring Bill Richardson as a candidate

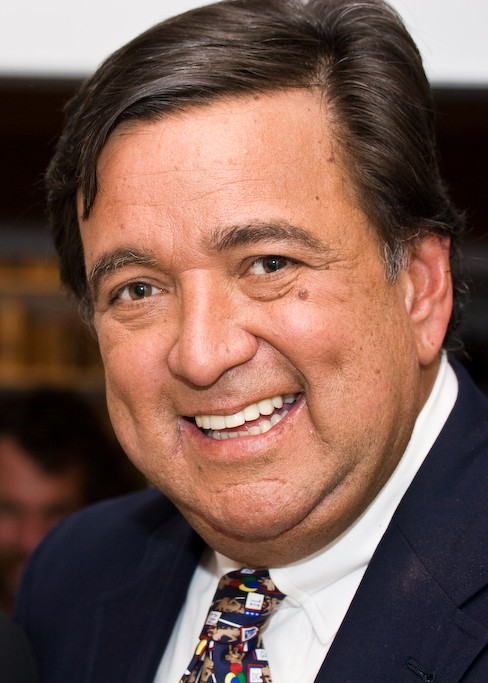
Gov. Bill Richardson (D-NM)

Generally, a successful candidate and administrator, Richardson was a member of the Democratic Party, serving as the Representative from the newly established 3rd congressional district in New Mexico, from 1983 to 1997, the U.S. Ambassador to the United Nations from 1997 to 1998, and as the U.S. Secretary of Energy, from 1998 to 2001. Richardson returned to state office, serving as the 30th Governor of New Mexico from 2003 to 2011. He ran unsuccessfully for U.S. president in 2008. He also served as the chairman for the 2004 Democratic National Convention, and chair of the Democratic Governors Association.

== Congressional races (1980–1996) ==
New Mexico's 1st congressional district, 1980:

- Manuel Lujan, Jr. (R) (inc.) – 125,910 (51.01%)
- Bill Richardson – 120,903 (48.99%)

New Mexico's 3rd congressional district, 1982 (Democratic primary):

- Bill Richardson – 23,123 (36.22%)
- Roberto A. Mondragon – 19,691 (30.84%)
- George Perez – 12,412 (19.44%)
- Tom Udall – 8,619 (13.50%)

New Mexico's 3rd congressional district, 1982:

- Bill Richardson (D) – 84,669 (64.49%)
- Marjorie Bell Chambers (R) – 46,466 (35.39%)
- David A. Fernandez (I) – 158 (0.12%)

New Mexico's 3rd congressional district, 1984:

- Bill Richardson (D) (inc.) – 100,470 (60.81%)
- Louis H. Gallegos (R) – 62,351 (37.74%)
- Shirley Machocky Jones (LBT) – 2,388 (1.45%)

New Mexico's 3rd congressional district, 1986:

- Bill Richardson (D) (inc.) – 95,760 (71.30%)
- David F. Cargo (R) – 38,552 (28.70%)

New Mexico's 3rd congressional district, 1988:

- Bill Richardson (D) (inc.) – 124,938 (73.11%)
- Cecilia M. Salazar (R) – 45,954 (26.89%)

New Mexico's 3rd congressional district, 1990:

- Bill Richardson (D) (inc.) – 104,225 (74.46%)
- Phil T. Archuletta (R) – 35,751 (25.54%)

New Mexico's 3rd congressional district, 1992:

- Bill Richardson (D) (inc.) – 122,850 (67.42%)
- F. Gregg Bemis, Jr. (R) – 54,569 (29.95%)
- Ed Nagel (LBT) – 4,798 (2.63%)

New Mexico's 3rd congressional district, 1994:

- Bill Richardson (D) (inc,) – 99,900 (63.59%)
- F. Gregg Bemis, Jr. (R) – 53,515 (34.06%)
- Ed Nagel (LBT) – 3,697 (2.35%)

New Mexico's 3rd congressional district, 1996:

- Bill Richardson (D) (inc.) – 124,594 (67.25%)
- Bill Redmond (R) – 56,580 (30.54%)
- Ed Nagel (LBT) – 4,097 (2.21%)

== Administration appointments (1996–2001) ==
United States Ambassador to the United Nations, 1997 (confirmation in the United States Senate):

- Yea – 100
- Nay – 0

United States Secretary of Energy, 1998 (confirmation in the United States Senate):

- Yea – 100
- Nay – 0

== New Mexico gubernatorial races (2002–2006) ==
Democratic primary for Governor of New Mexico, 2002:

- Bill Richardson – 147,524 (99.80%)
- Mike Nalley (write-in) – 294 (0.20%)

New Mexico gubernatorial election, 2002:

- Bill Richardson/Diane Denish (D) – 268,693 (55.49%)
- John Sanchez/Rod Adair (R) – 189,074 (39.05%)
- David Bacon/Kathleen M. Sanchez (Green) – 26,466 (5.47%)

Democratic primary for Governor of New Mexico, 2006:

- Bill Richardson (inc.) – 107,720 (99.64%)
- Anselmo A. Chavez (write-in) – 388 (0.36%)

New Mexico gubernatorial election, 2006:

- Bill Richardson/Diane Denish (D) (inc.) – 384,806 (68.82%)
- John Dendahl/Sue Wilson Beffort (R) – 174,364 (31.18%)

== United States presidential election, 2008 ==
2008 New Hampshire Democratic vice presidential primary:

- Raymond Stebbins – 50,485 (46.93%)
- William Bryk – 22,965 (21.35%)
- John Edwards* – 10,553 (9.81%)
- Barack Obama* 6,402 (5.95%)
- Bill Richardson* (write-in) – 5,525 (5.14%)
- Hillary Clinton* (write-in) – 3,419 (3.18%)
- Joe Biden* – 1,512 (1.41%)
- Al Gore* – 966 (0.90%)
- Dennis Kucinich* – 762 (0.71%)
- Bill Clinton* – 388 (0.36%)
- John McCain* – 293 (0.27%)
- Christopher Dodd* – 224 (0.21%)
- Ron Paul* – 176 (0.16%)
- Jack Barnes, Jr.* – 95 (0.09%)
- Mike Gravel* – 91 (0.09%)
- Joe Lieberman* – 67 (0.06%)
- Mitt Romney* – 66 (0.06%)
- Mike Huckabee* – 63 (0.06%)
- Rudy Giuliani* – 46 (0.04%)
- Darrel Hunter* – 20 (0.02%)

(* – write-in)

2008 Democratic presidential primaries:

Excluding penalized contests, only primary and caucuses votes:

- Barack Obama^{PN} – 16,706,853
- Hillary Clinton – 16,239,821
- John Edwards* – 742,010
- Bill Richardson* – 89,054
- Uncommitted – 82,660
- Dennis Kucinich* – 68,482
- Joe Biden* – 64,041
- Mike Gravel* – 27,662
- Christopher Dodd* – 25,300
- Others – 22,556

Including penalized contests:

- Hillary Clinton – 18,225,175 (48.03%)
- Barack Obama^{PN} – 17,988,182 (47.41%)
- John Edwards* – 1,006,275 (2.65%)
- Uncommitted – 299,610 (0.79%)
- Bill Richardson* – 106,073 (0.28%)
- Dennis Kucinich* – 103,994 (0.27%)
- Joe Biden* – 81,641 (0.22%)
- Scattering – 44,348 (0.12%)
- Mike Gravel* – 40,251 (0.11%)
- Christopher Dodd* – 35,281 (0.09%)

(* – dropped out from race)
(PN – presumptive nominee)
