= Ed V. Mead =

American politician and businessman

Ed Mead

Member of the New Mexico Senate
- In office 1964–1974

17th Lieutenant Governor of New Mexico
- In office January 1, 1959 – January 1, 1961
- Governor: John Burroughs
- Preceded by: Joseph Montoya
- Succeeded by: Tom Bolack

Personal details
- Born: 1921 Abilene, Texas, U.S.
- Died: March 4, 1983 (aged 61) Albuquerque, New Mexico, U.S.
- Party: Democratic

Ed V. Mead (1921 – March 4, 1983) was an American politician and businessman who served as the 17th lieutenant governor of New Mexico under Governor John Burroughs.

== Background ==
Mead was born and raised in Abilene, Texas. He relocated Albuquerque, New Mexico, in 1948, where he operated a bakery business. Mead was elected the 17th lieutenant governor of New Mexico in 1958 and assumed office on January 1, 1959. He served until January 1, 1961, and was succeeded in office by Tom Bolack. Mead was a candidate in the 1962 New Mexico gubernatorial election, losing the Democratic primary to Jack M. Campbell. From 1964 to 1974, he served as a member of the New Mexico Senate. He also served on the Bernalillo County Commission.

Mead died at St. Joseph Hospital in Albuquerque, New Mexico, on March 4, 1983, at the age of 61.
