= Justice Watson =

Justice Watson may refer to:

- Albert Watson (Illinois judge) (1857–1944), associate justice of the Illinois Supreme Court
- Edward B. Watson (judge) (1844–1915), chief justice of the Oregon Supreme Court
- Edward M. Watson (1874–1938), associate justice of the Supreme Court of Hawaii
- Jack C. Watson (1928–2022), associate justice of the Louisiana Supreme Court
- James F. Watson (1840–1897), associate justice of the Oregon Supreme Court
- John C. Watson (judge) (1878–1970), associate justice of the New Mexico Supreme Court
- John H. Watson (Vermont judge) (1851–1929), chief justice of the Vermont Supreme Court
- John Hampton Watson (1804–1883), associate justice of the Kansas Supreme Court
- John T. Watson (1908–2007), associate justice of the New Mexico Supreme Court

== See also ==
- Judge Watson (disambiguation)
