= John C. Watson =

John C. Watson may refer to:

- John C. Watson (admiral) (1842–1923), admiral of the United States Navy
- John C. Watson (judge) (1878–1970), justice of the New Mexico Supreme Court

== See also ==
- Sir John Watson (advocate) (John Charles Watson, 1883–1944), Scottish advocate and sheriff, Solicitor General for Scotland 1929–31
- Chris Watson (John Christian Watson, 1867–1941), Australia's third prime minister
- John William Clark Watson (1808–1890), Confederate politician and judge
