= Justice Carmody =

Justice Carmody may refer to:

- David W. Carmody (1908–1976), associate justice of the New Mexico Supreme Court
- John Carmody (judge) (1854–1920), associate justice of the North Dakota Supreme Court
