= 1960 New Mexico gubernatorial election =

- November 8, 1960
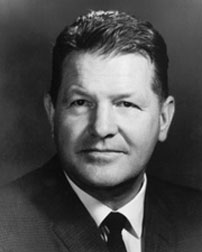

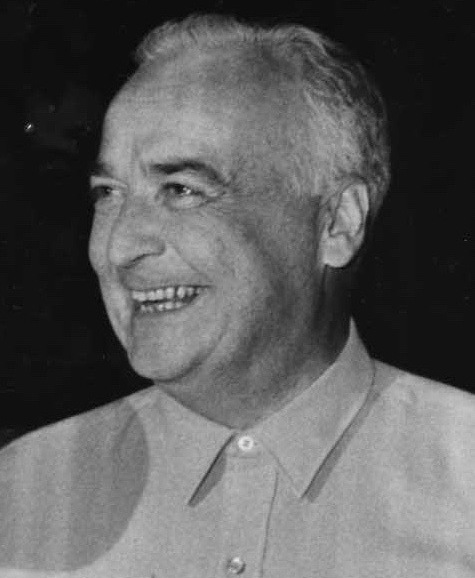
Nominee	Edwin L. Mechem	John Burroughs
Party	Republican	Democratic
Popular vote	153,765	151,777
Percentage	50.32%	49.67%
- County results Mechem: 50–60% 60–70% Burroughs: 50–60% 60–70% Tie: 50%
Governor before election
John Burroughs
Democratic
Elected Governor
Edwin L. Mechem
Republican

The 1960 New Mexico gubernatorial election took place on November 8, 1960, in order to elect the governor of New Mexico. Incumbent Democrat John Burroughs ran for reelection to a second term against his predecessor Republican Edwin L. Mechem in a rematch of the very close 1958 election. This time, Mechem narrowly defeated Burroughs by an even smaller margin than was seen in the previous election. This is the most recent gubernatorial election in which a Republican candidate won Santa Fe County.

== Democratic primary ==
The Democratic primary was won by incumbent governor John Burroughs.

=== Results ===
New Mexico Democratic gubernatorial primary, 1960
Party	Candidate	Votes	%
Democratic	John Burroughs (incumbent)	66,541	53.75%
Democratic	Joseph A. Bursey	48,841	39.45%
Democratic	Thomas E. Holland	8,413	6.80%
Total votes		123,795	100.00%

== Republican primary ==
The Republican primary was won by former governor Edwin L. Mechem.

=== Results ===
New Mexico Democratic gubernatorial primary, 1960
Party	Candidate	Votes	%
Republican	Edwin L. Mechem	29,486	75.96%
Republican	Paul W. Robinson	9,331	24.04%
Total votes		38,817	100.00%

== General election ==
=== Results ===
1960 New Mexico gubernatorial election
Party	Candidate	Votes	%	±%
Republican	Edwin L. Mechem	153,765	50.32%	+0.79%
Democratic	John Burroughs (incumbent)	151,777	49.67%	−0.80%
	Scattering	28	0.01%	
Majority		1,988	0.65%	
Total votes		305,570	100.00%	
Republican gain from Democratic				

=== Results by county ===
County	Edwin L. Mechem Republican		John Burroughs Democratic		Margin		Total votes cast
County	#	%	#	%	#	%	Total votes cast
Bernalillo	46,880	55.47%	37,628	44.53%	9,252	10.95%	84,508
Catron	733	59.26%	504	40.74%	229	18.51%	1,237
Chaves	8,567	57.05%	6,449	42.95%	2,118	14.10%	15,016
Colfax	2,282	42.46%	3,092	57.54%	-810	-15.07%	5,374
Curry	4,740	50.23%	4,696	49.77%	44	0.47%	9,436
De Baca	745	56.23%	580	43.77%	165	12.45%	1,325
Doña Ana	8,629	52.85%	7,699	47.15%	930	5.70%	16,328
Eddy	6,714	40.73%	9,770	59.27%	-3,056	-18.54%	16,484
Grant	2,889	43.15%	3,807	56.85%	-918	-13.71%	6,696
Guadalupe	1,261	44.67%	1,562	55.33%	-301	-10.66%	2,823
Harding	573	56.96%	432	42.94%	141	14.02%	1,006 (Note: Includes 1 write-in vote)
Hidalgo	710	43.94%	906	56.06%	-196	-12.13%	1,616
Lea	5,468	35.99%	9,724	64.01%	-4,256	-28.01%	15,192
Lincoln	1,986	57.09%	1,493	42.91%	493	14.17%	3,479
Los Alamos	2,926	56.27%	2,257	43.40%	669	12.87%	5,200 (Note: Includes 17 write-in votes)
Luna	1,367	43.11%	1,804	56.89%	-437	-13.78%	3,171
McKinley	4,464	46.18%	5,203	53.82%	-739	-7.64%	9,667
Mora	1,514	53.86%	1,297	46.14%	217	7.72%	2,811
Otero	4,622	50.00%	4,622	50.00%	0	0.00%	9,244
Quay	2,492	53.86%	2,130	46.03%	362	7.82%	4,627 (Note: Includes 5 write-in votes)
Rio Arriba	4,445	44.96%	5,440	55.03%	-995	-10.06%	9,886
Roosevelt	2,710	47.06%	3,048	52.93%	-338	-5.87%	5,759
San Juan	7,669	60.22%	5,065	39.77%	2,604	20.45%	12,735
San Miguel	4,610	48.56%	4,882	51.42%	-272	-2.86%	9,494 (Note: Includes 2 write-in votes)
Sandoval	1,661	40.79%	2,411	59.21%	-750	-18.42%	4,072
Santa Fe	8,985	51.24%	8,549	48.76%	436	2.49%	17,534
Sierra	1,538	49.76%	1,553	50.24%	-15	-0.49%	3,091
Socorro	1,780	43.47%	2,315	56.53%	-535	-13.06%	4,095
Taos	2,912	46.56%	3,342	53.44%	-430	-6.88%	6,254
Torrance	1,374	48.18%	1,478	51.82%	-104	-3.65%	2,852
Union	1,469	53.89%	1,257	46.11%	212	7.78%	2,726
Valencia	5,050	42.68%	6,782	57.32%	-1,732	-14.64%	11,832
Total	153,765	50.32%	151,777	49.67%	1,988	0.65%	305,570

==== Counties that flipped from Democratic to Republican ====
- Chaves
- Curry
- Doña Ana
- Los Alamos
- Quay
- Union

==== Counties that flipped from Republican to Democratic ====
- Colfax
- Guadalupe
- McKinley
- Rio Arriba
- Sierra
- Taos
- Valencia
