= 1954 New Mexico gubernatorial election =

- November 2, 1954
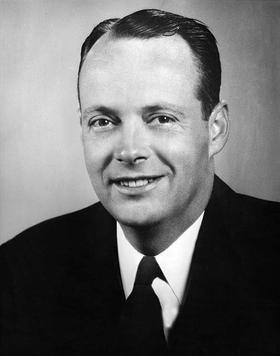

| Nominee | John F. Simms | Alvin Stockton |
| Party | Democratic | Republican |
| Popular vote | 110,583 | 83,373 |
| Percentage | 57.01% | 42.99% |
- County results Simms: 50–60% 60–70% 70–80% Stockton: 50–60%
Governor before election
Edwin L. Mechem
Republican
Elected Governor
John F. Simms
Democratic

The 1954 New Mexico gubernatorial election took place on November 2, 1954, in order to elect the Governor of New Mexico. Incumbent Republican Edwin L. Mechem was term-limited, and could not run for reelection to a third consecutive term. Democrat John F. Simms defeated Republican Alvin Stockton, winning the largest share of the vote for any candidate since Clyde Tingley in 1936. Simms was the first Democrat since Tingley in 1936 to carry Torrance County and Valencia County.

== General election ==
=== Results ===
1954 New Mexico gubernatorial election
| Party | Candidate | Votes | % | ±% |
|---|---|---|---|---|
| Democratic | John F. Simms | 110,583 | 57.01% | +10.78% |
| Republican | Alvin Stockton | 83,373 | 42.99% | −10.78% |
| Majority | | 27,210 | 14.03% | |
| Total votes | | 193,956 | 100.00% | |
| Democratic gain from Republican | | Swing | +21.56% | |

=== Results by county ===
| County | John F. Simms Democratic | | Alvin Stockton Republican | | Margin | | Total votes cast |
| County | # | % | # | % | # | % | Total votes cast |
|---|---|---|---|---|---|---|---|
| Bernalillo | 24,695 | 54.19% | 20,874 | 45.81% | 3,821 | 8.39% | 45,569 |
| Catron | 573 | 48.60% | 606 | 51.40% | -33 | -2.80% | 1,179 |
| Chaves | 4,291 | 52.94% | 3,815 | 47.06% | 476 | 5.87% | 8,106 |
| Colfax | 2,751 | 51.43% | 2,598 | 48.57% | 153 | 2.86% | 5,349 |
| Curry | 3,489 | 60.42% | 2,286 | 39.58% | 1,203 | 20.83% | 5,775 |
| De Baca | 674 | 61.55% | 421 | 38.45% | 253 | 23.11% | 1,095 |
| Doña Ana | 4,803 | 58.44% | 3,415 | 41.53% | 1,388 | 16.89% | 8,218 |
| Eddy | 7,064 | 69.65% | 3,078 | 30.35% | 3,986 | 39.30% | 10,142 |
| Grant | 3,798 | 70.73% | 1,572 | 29.27% | 2,226 | 41.45% | 5,370 |
| Guadalupe | 1,514 | 54.64% | 1,257 | 45.36% | 257 | 9.27% | 2,771 |
| Harding | 520 | 49.90% | 522 | 50.10% | -2 | -0.19% | 1,042 |
| Hidalgo | 735 | 70.27% | 311 | 29.73% | 424 | 40.54% | 1,046 |
| Lea | 4,221 | 69.81% | 1,825 | 30.19% | 2,396 | 39.63% | 6,046 |
| Lincoln | 1,319 | 49.27% | 1,358 | 50.73% | -39 | -1.46% | 2,677 |
| Los Alamos | 2,051 | 59.14% | 1,417 | 40.86% | 634 | 18.28% | 3,468 |
| Luna | 1,542 | 62.89% | 910 | 37.11% | 632 | 25.77% | 2,452 |
| McKinley | 3,342 | 64.58% | 1,833 | 35.42% | 1,509 | 29.16% | 5,175 |
| Mora | 1,348 | 45.51% | 1,614 | 54.49% | -266 | -8.98% | 2,962 |
| Otero | 2,402 | 59.03% | 1,667 | 40.97% | 735 | 18.06% | 4,069 |
| Quay | 2,396 | 64.39% | 1,325 | 35.61% | 1,071 | 28.78% | 3,721 |
| Rio Arriba | 4,612 | 53.27% | 4,045 | 46.73% | 567 | 6.55% | 8,657 |
| Roosevelt | 2,859 | 72.12% | 1,105 | 27.88% | 1,754 | 44.25% | 3,964 |
| San Juan | 2,173 | 48.63% | 2,295 | 51.37% | -122 | -2.73% | 4,468 |
| San Miguel | 4,809 | 54.19% | 4,066 | 45.81% | 743 | 8.37% | 8,875 |
| Sandoval | 1,718 | 52.28% | 1,568 | 47.72% | 150 | 4.56% | 3,286 |
| Santa Fe | 7,548 | 53.39% | 6,590 | 46.61% | 958 | 6.78% | 14,138 |
| Sierra | 1,480 | 52.26% | 1,352 | 47.74% | 128 | 4.52% | 2,832 |
| Socorro | 2,010 | 55.31% | 1,624 | 44.69% | 386 | 10.62% | 3,634 |
| Taos | 3,246 | 58.57% | 2,296 | 41.43% | 950 | 17.14% | 5,542 |
| Torrance | 1,479 | 52.88% | 1,318 | 47.12% | 161 | 5.76% | 2,797 |
| Union | 1,383 | 51.66% | 1,294 | 48.34% | 89 | 3.32% | 2,677 |
| Valencia | 3,738 | 54.54% | 3,116 | 45.46% | 622 | 9.07% | 6,854 |
| Total | 110,583 | 57.01% | 83,373 | 42.99% | 27,210 | 14.03% | 193,956 |

==== Counties that flipped from Republican to Democratic ====
- Bernalillo
- Chaves
- Colfax
- Curry
- De Baca
- Doña Ana
- Guadalupe
- Luna
- McKinley
- Otero
- Quay
- Roosevelt
- San Miguel
- Sandoval
- Santa Fe
- Sierra
- Socorro
- Taos
- Torrance
- Union
- Valencia
