= Donnan Stephenson =

American judge (1919–2000)

Justice of the New Mexico Supreme Court
- In office January 1, 1971 – June 30, 1976
- Preceded by: John T. Watson
- Succeeded by: Mack Easley

Personal details
- Born: William Donnan Stephenson; November 21, 1919 La Harpe, Kansas
- Died: January 10, 2000 (aged 80) Santa Fe, New Mexico
- Spouse: Patricia Stephenson
- Children: 2
- Education: University of Kansas
- Occupation: Attorney, judge

William Donnan Stephenson (November 21, 1919 – January 10, 2000) was a justice of the New Mexico Supreme Court from January 1, 1971 until his retirement on June 30, 1976.

== Biography ==
Stephenson was born on November 21, 1919 in La Harpe, Kansas. He served some time with the U.S. Navy during World War II including aboard the USS Herndon. He received the Bronze Star. He retired from the Navy Reserve as a lieutenant commander. He then later graduated from the University of Kansas and the University of Kansas School of Law.

Stephenson entered the practice of law in Santa Fe, first partnering with Harry L. Bigbee in the firm of Bigbee and Stephenson, and later partnering with other attorneys including former governor Jack M. Campbell, beginning in 1966. In February 1970, Stephenson declared his candidacy for the state supreme court. Stephenson narrowly defeated state legislator Finnis Heidel for the Democratic Party nomination in July of that year, and then handily defeated incumbent John T. Watson in the November general election.

Stephenson was reelected without opposition in 1974, but retired two years into his second term, on June 30, 1976, citing factors including inadequate pay, the retirement of friends on the court, and the belief that he had accomplished enough as a justice.

== Personal life ==
Stephenson was married to Patricia Stephenson. They had two children; Mark and Bruce Stephenson.

Stephenson died in Santa Fe at the age of 80.

Political offices
Preceded by John T. Watson	Justice of the New Mexico Supreme Court; 1971–1976	Succeeded by Mack Easley
