= 1964 New Mexico gubernatorial election =

- November 3, 1964
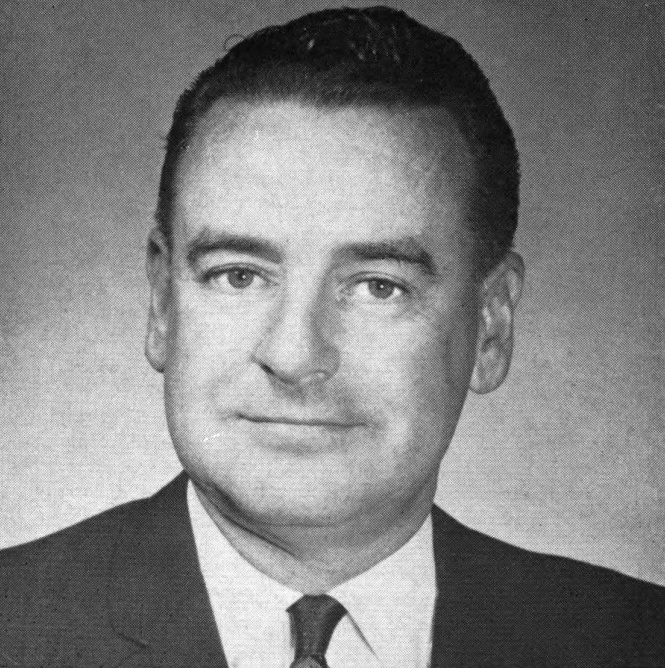

Nominee	Jack M. Campbell	Merle H. Tucker
Party	Democratic	Republican
Popular vote	191,497	126,540
Percentage	60.21%	39.79%
- County results Campbell: 50–60% 60–70% 70–80% Tucker: 50–60%
Governor before election
Jack M. Campbell
Democratic
Elected Governor
David Cargo
Democratic

The 1964 New Mexico gubernatorial election took place on November 3, 1964, in order to elect the Governor of New Mexico. Incumbent Democrat Jack M. Campbell ran for reelection to a second term against Republican Merle H. Tucker. Campbell defeated Tucker in a landslide, receiving the largest share of the vote by any New Mexico gubernatorial candidate to that point. Campbell's 60.21% vote share remained the largest ever in the state's history until 2006 when Bill Richardson received 68.82% of the vote. Richardson's 2006 landslide is also the only time since this election that Chaves County and San Juan County have voted for a Democratic gubernatorial candidate and Los Alamos County also did not vote Democratic again until 2006.

== Primary election ==
=== Democratic primary ===
Incumbent governor Jack M. Campbell was unopposed in the Democratic primary.

=== Republican primary ===
Merle H. Tucker was unopposed in the Republican primary.

== General election ==
=== Results ===
1964 New Mexico gubernatorial election
Party	Candidate	Votes	%	±%
Democratic	Jack M. Campbell (incumbent)	191,497	60.21%	+7.23%
Republican	Merle H. Tucker	126,540	39.79%	−7.23%
	Scattering	5	0.00%	
Majority		64,957	20.42%	
Total votes		318,042	100.00%	
Democratic hold				

=== Results by county ===
County	Jack M. Campbell Democratic		Merle H. Tucker Republican		Margin		Total votes cast
County	#	%	#	%	#	%	Total votes cast
Bernalillo	53,047	55.65%	42,284	44.35%	10,763	11.29%	95,331
Catron	604	52.94%	537	47.06%	67	5.87%	1,141
Chaves	8,811	53.17%	7,759	46.83%	1,052	6.35%	16,570
Colfax	3,404	69.98%	1,460	30.02%	1,944	39.97%	4,864
Curry	5,936	60.84%	3,821	39.16%	2,115	21.68%	9,757
De Baca	721	61.10%	459	38.90%	262	22.20%	1,180
Doña Ana	10,710	61.32%	6,755	38.68%	3,955	22.65%	17,465
Eddy	11,460	65.44%	6,053	34.56%	5,407	30.87%	17,513
Grant	5,272	75.53%	1,707	24.46%	3,565	51.07%	6,980 (Note: Includes 1 write-in vote)
Guadalupe	1,629	61.75%	1,009	38.25%	620	23.50%	2,638
Harding	429	49.42%	439	50.58%	-10	-1.15%	868
Hidalgo	1,105	70.56%	461	29.44%	644	41.12%	1,566
Lea	9,400	60.76%	6,070	39.23%	3,330	21.52%	15,471
Lincoln	1,519	47.29%	1,693	52.71%	-174	-5.42%	3,212
Los Alamos	3,450	61.07%	2,198	38.91%	1,252	22.16%	5,649
Luna	2,396	63.60%	1,371	36.40%	1,025	27.21%	3,767
McKinley	6,315	67.02%	3,108	32.98%	3,207	34.03%	9,423
Mora	1,330	53.44%	1,159	46.56%	171	6.87%	2,489
Otero	5,929	63.67%	3,383	36.33%	2,546	27.34%	9,312
Quay	2,580	60.71%	1,670	39.29%	910	21.41%	4,250
Rio Arriba	6,300	66.56%	3,165	33.44%	3,135	33.12%	9,465
Roosevelt	3,149	58.54%	2,230	41.46%	919	17.08%	5,379
San Juan	7,507	56.34%	5,818	43.66%	1,689	12.68%	13,325
San Miguel	5,074	61.24%	3,212	38.76%	1,862	22.47%	8,286
Sandoval	3,226	73.14%	1,183	26.82%	2,043	46.32%	4,411 (Note: Includes 2 write-in votes)
Santa Fe	12,116	66.80%	6,021	33.20%	6,095	33.61%	18,137
Sierra	1,620	53.17%	1,427	46.83%	193	6.33%	3,047
Socorro	2,352	57.51%	1,738	42.49%	614	15.01%	4,090
Taos	4,036	66.23%	2,058	33.77%	1,978	32.46%	6,094
Torrance	1,439	55.37%	1,160	44.63%	279	10.73%	2,599
Union	1,291	55.98%	1,015	44.02%	276	11.97%	2,306
Valencia	7,340	64.07%	4,117	35.93%	3,223	28.13%	11,457
Total	191,497	60.21%	126,540	39.79%	64,957	20.42%	318,042

==== Counties that flipped from Republican to Democratic ====
- Catron
- Chaves
- Curry
- De Baca
- Mora
- Roosevelt
