= 1940 New Mexico gubernatorial election =

- November 5, 1940
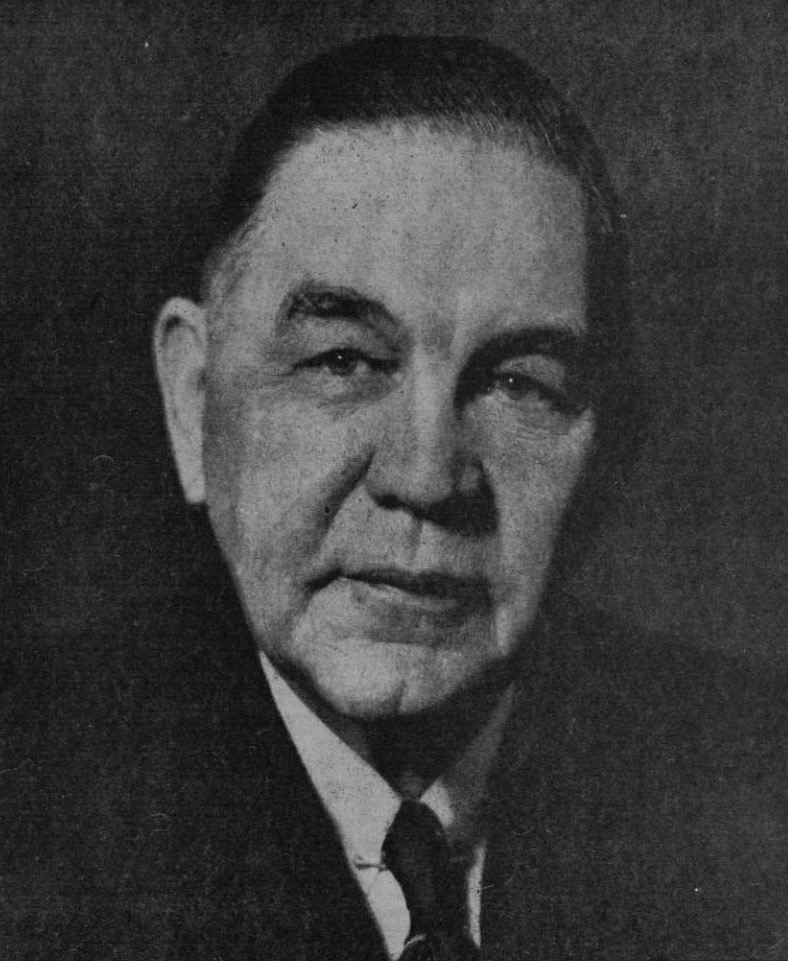

Nominee	John E. Miles	Mauricio F. Miera
Party	Democratic	Republican
Popular vote	103,035	82,306
Percentage	55.59%	44.41%
- County results Miles: 50–60% 60–70% 70–80% 80–90% Miera: 50–60% 60–70%
Governor before election
John E. Miles
Democratic
Elected Governor
John E. Miles
Democratic

The 1940 New Mexico gubernatorial election took place on November 5, 1940, in order to elect the Governor of New Mexico. Incumbent Democrat John E. Miles won reelection to a second term. Former governor Clyde Tingley unsuccessfully sought the Democratic nomination. This was the first gubernatorial election since 1924 in which Bernalillo County backed the losing candidate. This was the last election until 2006 in which Lincoln County backed a Democrat and San Juan County did not vote Democratic again until 1962.

== General election ==
=== Results ===
1940 New Mexico gubernatorial election
Party	Candidate	Votes	%	±%
Democratic	John E. Miles (incumbent)	103,035	55.59%	+3.35%
Republican	Mauricio F. Miera	82,306	44.41%	−3.18%
Majority		20,729	11.18%	
Total votes		185,341	100.00%	
Democratic hold		Swing	+6.54%	

=== Results by county ===
County	John E. Miles Democratic		Mauricio F. Miera Republican		Margin		Total votes cast
County	#	%	#	%	#	%	Total votes cast
Bernalillo	12,687	47.24%	14,171	52.76%	-1,484	-5.53%	26,858
Catron	1,049	52.11%	964	47.89%	85	4.22%	2,013
Chaves	5,153	69.48%	2,264	30.52%	2,889	38.95%	7,417
Colfax	4,363	55.98%	3,431	44.02%	932	11.96%	7,794
Curry	5,007	78.42%	1,378	21.58%	3,629	56.84%	6,385
De Baca	1,015	69.14%	453	30.86%	562	38.28%	1,468
Doña Ana	4,963	54.88%	4,080	45.12%	883	9.76%	9,043
Eddy	5,297	79.11%	1,399	20.89%	3,898	58.21%	6,696
Grant	3,863	64.39%	2.136	35.61%	1,727	28.79%	5,999
Guadalupe	1,978	50.73%	1,921	49.27%	57	1.46%	3,899
Harding	996	49.33%	1,023	50.67%	-27	-1.34%	2,019
Hidalgo	1,238	77.76%	354	22.24%	884	55.53%	1,592
Lea	4,699	82.15%	1,021	17.85%	3,678	64.30%	5,720
Lincoln	1,873	52.20%	1,715	47.80%	158	4.40%	3,588
Luna	1,536	61.96%	943	38.04%	593	23.92%	2,479
McKinley	2,662	62.75%	1,580	37.25%	1,082	25.51%	4,242
Mora	1,733	39.47%	2,658	60.53%	-925	-21.07%	4,391
Otero	1,898	55.06%	1,549	44.94%	349	10.12%	3,447
Quay	3,445	72.66%	1,296	27.34%	2,149	45.33%	4,741
Rio Arriba	4,273	46.12%	4,991	53.88%	-718	-7.75%	9,264
Roosevelt	3,610	78.05%	1,015	21.95%	2,595	56.11%	4,625
San Juan	1,766	54.19%	1,493	45.81%	273	8.38%	3,259
San Miguel	5,538	50.02%	5,534	49.98%	4	0.04%	11,072
Sandoval	1,757	42.79%	2,349	57.21%	-592	-14.42%	4,106
Santa Fe	6,417	49.85%	6,456	50.15%	-39	-0.30%	12,873
Sierra	1,504	50.83%	1,455	49.17%	49	1.66%	2,959
Socorro	2,361	45.37%	2,843	54.63%	-482	-9.26%	5,204
Taos	3,212	47.02%	3,619	52.98%	-407	-5.96%	6,831
Torrance	2,007	44.31%	2,522	55.69%	-515	-11.37%	4,529
Union	2,244	56.34%	1,739	43.66%	505	12.68%	3,983
Valencia	2,891	42.24%	3,954	57.76%	-1,063	-15.53%	6,845
Total	103,035	55.59%	82,306	44.41%	20,729	11.18%	185,341

==== Counties that flipped from Republican to Democratic ====
- Catron
- Chaves
- Colfax
- Lincoln
- San Juan
- Union

==== Counties that flipped from Democratic to Republican ====
- Bernalillo
- Rio Arriba
- Santa Fe
- Socorro
- Taos
