= 2006 New Mexico gubernatorial election =

- November 7, 2006
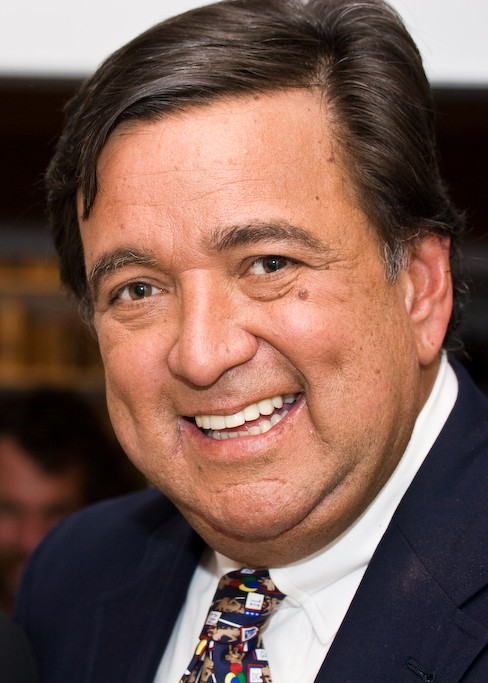

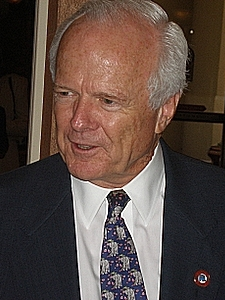
Nominee	Bill Richardson	John Dendahl
Party	Democratic	Republican
Running mate	Diane Denish	Sue Wilson Beffort
Popular vote	384,806	174,364
Percentage	68.82%	31.18%
- County results Richardson: 50–60% 60–70% 70–80% 80–90% Dendahl: 50–60%
Governor before election
Bill Richardson
Democratic
Elected Governor
Bill Richardson
Democratic

The 2006 New Mexico gubernatorial election was a race for the governor of New Mexico held on November 7, 2006. Incumbent Democratic Governor Bill Richardson was running for re-election. He faced Republican John Dendahl in the general election and won by a landslide. As of 2026, this was the last time a male candidate was elected Governor of New Mexico.

The scale of Richardson's lopsided victory was nearly unprecedented in the traditionally competitive state. Richardson's 68.82% share of the vote is the highest achieved by any gubernatorial candidate in the state by a wide margin, beating the previous record of 60.21% set in 1964. Richardson came within six votes of sweeping every county in the state, a feat that has never been achieved in any gubernatorial (or presidential) election in the state.

== Primary election ==
=== Democratic party ===
==== Candidates ====
- Bill Richardson, incumbent governor of New Mexico
- Anselmo A. Chavez, veteran and perennial candidate

==== Results ====
Democratic primary results
Party	Candidate	Votes	%
Democratic	Bill Richardson (incumbent)	107,720	99.64%
Democratic	Anselmo A. Chávez (write-in)	388	0.36%
Total votes		108,108	100.00%

=== Republican party ===
==== Candidates ====
- James R. Damron, physician
- George Brent Bailey Jr., educator and minister

==== Results ====
Republican primary results
Party	Candidate	Votes	%
Republican	James R. Damron	52,888	99.58%
Republican	George Bailey (write-in)	225	0.42%
Total votes		53,113	100.00%

== General election ==
=== Candidates ===
- Bill Richardson (Democrat), incumbent governor of New Mexico
- John Dendahl (Republican), former chair of the Republican Party of New Mexico

=== Campaign ===
James R. Damron easily won the Republican primary, but withdrew from the race on June 17, 2006, due to a lack of fundraising. John Dendahl was appointed by the Republican State Central Committee to replace him. There were no general election debates between the two candidates.

=== Predictions ===
Source	Ranking	As of
The Cook Political Report	Solid D	November 6, 2006
Sabato's Crystal Ball	Safe D	November 6, 2006
Rothenberg Political Report	Safe D	November 2, 2006
Real Clear Politics	Safe D	November 6, 2006

=== Polling ===
Poll source	Date(s) administered	Sample size	Margin of error	Bill Richardson (D)	John Dendahl (R)	Other	Undecided
Research & Polling Inc. of Albuquerque	September 25–28, 2006	—	—	60%	28%	—	—
Rasmussen Reports	September 7, 2006	—	—	61%	26%	—	—
Research & Polling Inc. of Albuquerque	August 25–31, 2006	—	—	57%	28%	—	—
Rasmussen Reports	June 26, 2006	—	—	56%	32%	—	—

=== Results ===
2006 New Mexico gubernatorial election
Party	Candidate	Votes	%	±%
Democratic	Bill Richardson (incumbent)	384,806	68.82%	+13.33%
Republican	John Dendahl	174,364	31.18%	−7.86%
Majority		210,442	37.63%	
Total votes		559,170	100.00%	
Democratic hold		Swing	+21.19%	

==== By county ====
Richardson was the first Democrat to win Lincoln County since John E. Miles in 1940. He was also the first Democrat to carry Chaves County, Los Alamos County, and San Juan County since Jack M. Campbell in 1964.

This is the most recent election in which a Democrat has carried Chaves County, Colfax County, Curry County, De Baca County, Eddy County, Harding County, Hidalgo County, Lea County, Lincoln County, Otero County, Quay County, Roosevelt County, San Juan County, Sierra County, Torrance County, Union County, and Valencia County.

County	Bill Richardson Democratic		John Dendahl Republican		Margin		Total votes cast
County	#	%	#	%	#	%	Total votes cast
Bernalillo	133,195	68.17%	62,205	31.83%	70,990	36.33%	195,400
Catron	857	49.83%	863	50.17%	-6	-0.35%	1,720
Chaves	9,060	57.49%	6,700	42.51%	2,360	14.97%	15,760
Cibola	4,698	75.97%	1,486	24.03%	3,212	51.94%	6,184
Colfax	3,125	64.39%	1,728	35.61%	1,397	28.79%	4,853
Curry	5,771	63.35%	3,339	36.65%	2,432	26.70%	9,110
De Baca	559	62.67%	333	37.33%	226	25.34%	892
Doña Ana	27,510	70.82%	11,335	29.18%	16,175	41.64%	38,845
Eddy	8,539	60.25%	5,633	39.75%	2,906	20.51%	14,172
Grant	7,502	72.55%	2,838	27.45%	4,664	45.11%	10,430
Guadalupe	1,546	84.30%	288	15.70%	1,258	68.59%	1,834
Harding	433	72.65%	163	27.35%	270	45.30%	596
Hidalgo	1,037	71.12%	421	28.88%	616	42.25%	1,458
Lea	6,473	55.13%	5,268	44.87%	1,205	10.26%	11,741
Lincoln	4,017	59.91%	2,688	40.09%	1,329	19.82%	6,705
Los Alamos	5,670	65.94%	2,929	34.06%	2,741	31.88%	8,599
Luna	4,284	70.33%	1,807	29.67%	2,477	40.67%	6,091
McKinley	14,973	86.05%	2,427	13.95%	12,546	72.10%	17,400
Mora	1,738	73.80%	617	26.20%	1,121	47.60%	2,355
Otero	8,271	57.80%	6,039	42.20%	2,232	15.60%	14,310
Quay	2,134	65.86%	1,106	34.14%	1,028	31.73%	3,240
Rio Arriba	8,621	81.46%	1,962	18.54%	6,659	62.92%	10,583
Roosevelt	2,350	57.32%	1,750	42.68%	600	14.63%	4,100
San Juan	18,846	60.08%	12,521	39.92%	6,325	20,16%	31,367
San Miguel	6,884	78.85%	1,847	21.15%	5,037	57.69%	8,731
Sandoval	24,722	67.69%	11,803	32.31%	12,919	35.37%	36,525
Santa Fe	37,649	79.07%	9,965	20.93%	27,684	58.14%	47,614
Sierra	2,445	57.49%	1,808	42.51%	637	14.98%	4,253
Socorro	4,551	72.78%	17,02	27.22%	2,849	45.56%	6,253
Taos	9,937	86.70%	1,524	13.30%	8,413	73.41%	11,461
Torrance	3,280	60.67%	2,126	39.33%	1,154	21.35%	5,406
Union	907	62.42%	546	37.58%	361	24.85%	1,453
Valencia	13,222	66.71%	6,597	33.29%	6,625	33.43%	19,819
Total	384,806	68.82%	174,364	31.18%	210,442	37.63%	559,170

Counties that flipped from Republican to Democratic

- Chaves (largest village: Roswell)
- Eddy (largest city: Carlsbad)
- Lincoln (largest city: Ruidoso)
- Los Alamos (largest city: Los Alamos)
- Otero (largest city: Alamogordo)
- San Juan (largest city: Farmington)
- Sierra (largest city: Truth or Consequences)
- Torrance (largest city: Moriarty)

== See also ==
- United States gubernatorial elections, 2006
