= 1952 New Mexico gubernatorial election =

- November 4, 1952
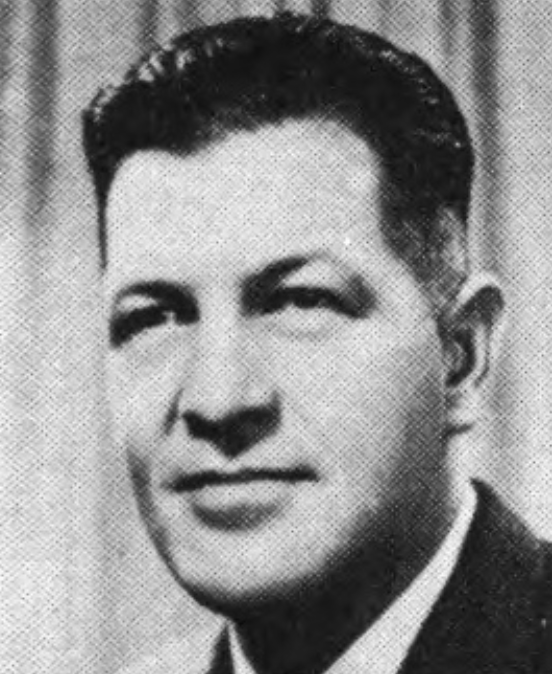

Nominee	Edwin L. Mechem	Everett Grantham
Party	Republican	Democratic
Popular vote	129,116	111,034
Percentage	53.76%	46.24%
- County results Mechem: 50–60% 60–70% Grantham: 50–60%
Governor before election
Edwin L. Mechem
Republican
Elected Governor
Edwin L. Mechem
Republican

The 1952 New Mexico gubernatorial election took place on November 4, 1952, in order to elect the Governor of New Mexico. Incumbent Republican Edwin L. Mechem ran for and won reelection to a second term. Mechem was the first Republican gubernatorial candidate to ever win Curry County, De Baca County, and Quay County. Moreover, Luna County and McKinley County voted Republican for the first time since 1930. Mechem was the last Republican to carry Otero County until Joe Skeen in 1974.

== General election ==
=== Results ===
1952 New Mexico gubernatorial election
Party	Candidate	Votes	%	±%
Republican	Edwin L. Mechem (incumbent)	129,116	53.76%	+0.02%
Democratic	Everett Grantham	111,034	46.24%	−0.02%
Majority		18,082	7.53%	
Total votes		240,150	100.00%	
Republican hold				

=== Results by county ===
County	Edwin L. Mechem Republican		Everett Grantham Democratic		Margin		Total votes cast
County	#	%	#	%	#	%	Total votes cast
Bernalillo	31,656	55.03%	25,866	44.97%	5,790	10.07%	57,522
Catron	768	62.44%	462	37.56%	306	24.88%	1,230
Chaves	6,637	60.65%	4,307	39.35%	2,330	21.29%	10,944
Colfax	3,591	54.12%	3,044	45.88%	547	8.24%	6,635
Curry	5,056	58.48%	3,590	41.52%	1,466	16.96%	8,646
De Baca	754	54.60%	627	45.40%	127	9.20%	1,381
Doña Ana	6,362	60.64%	4,129	39.36%	2,233	21.28%	10,491
Eddy	6,011	43.69%	7,748	56.31%	-1,737	-12.62%	13,759
Grant	3,294	41.09%	4,723	58.91%	-1,429	-17.82%	8,017
Guadalupe	1,525	52.14%	1,400	47.86%	125	4.27%	2,925
Harding	802	65.42%	424	34.58%	378	30.83%	1,226
Hidalgo	716	46.28%	831	53.72%	-115	-7.43%	1,547
Lea	4,304	42.87%	5,735	57.13%	-1,431	-14.25%	10,039
Lincoln	2,070	65.94%	1,069	34.06%	1,001	31.89%	3,139
Los Alamos	2,125	46.96%	2,400	53.04%	-275	-6.08%	4,525
Luna	1,686	55.31%	1,362	44.69%	324	10.63%	3,048
McKinley	3,278	52.38%	2,980	47.62%	298	4.76%	6,258
Mora	1,849	56.80%	1,406	43.20%	443	13.61%	3,255
Otero	2,587	54.76%	2,137	45.24%	450	9.53%	4,724
Quay	2,776	53.74%	2,390	46.26%	386	7.47%	5,166
Rio Arriba	4,331	48.62%	4,576	51.38%	-245	-2.75%	8,907
Roosevelt	2,993	54.38%	2,511	45.62%	482	8.76%	5,504
San Juan	3,929	68.35%	1,819	31.65%	2,110	36.71%	5,748
San Miguel	5,139	52.15%	4,715	47.85%	424	4.30%	9,854
Sandoval	1,778	51.46%	1,677	48.54%	101	2.92%	3,455
Santa Fe	8,487	53.50%	7,378	46.50%	1,109	6.99%	15,865
Sierra	1,937	59.82%	1,301	40.18%	636	19.64%	3,238
Socorro	2,199	54.69%	1,822	45.31%	377	9.38%	4,021
Taos	2,953	51.98%	2,728	48.02%	225	3.96%	5,681
Torrance	1,588	51.96%	1,468	48.04%	120	3.93%	3,056
Union	2,036	63.66%	1,162	36.34%	874	27.33%	3,198
Valencia	3,899	54.56%	3,247	45.44%	652	9.12%	7,146
Total	129,116	53.76%	111,034	46.24%	18,082	7.53%	240,150

==== Counties that flipped from Democratic to Republican ====
- Curry
- De Baca
- Guadalupe
- Luna
- McKinley
- Quay
- San Miguel
- Sandoval
- Socorro
- Taos

==== Counties that flipped from Republican to Democratic ====
- Grant
- Los Alamos
