= Judge Watson =

Judge Watson may refer to:

- Albert Leisenring Watson (1876–1960), judge of the United States District Court for the Middle District of Pennsylvania
- Derrick Watson (born 1966), judge of the United States District Court for the District of Hawaii
- James Lopez Watson (1922–2001), judge of the United States Court of International Trade
- Michael H. Watson (born 1956), judge of the United States District Court for the Southern District of Ohio

== See also ==
- Justice Watson (disambiguation)
