= 1956 New Mexico gubernatorial election =

- November 6, 1956
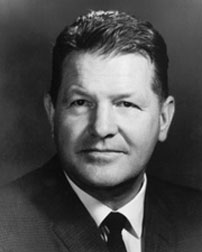

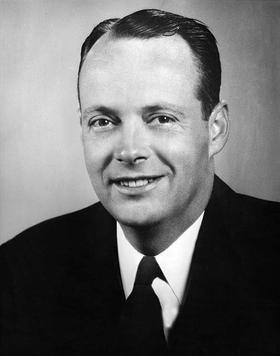
Nominee	Edwin L. Mechem	John F. Simms
Party	Republican	Democratic
Popular vote	131,488	120,263
Percentage	52.23%	47.77%
- County results Mechem: 50–60% Simms: 50–60% 60–70%
Governor before election
John F. Simms
Democratic
Elected Governor
Edwin L. Mechem
Republican

The 1956 New Mexico gubernatorial election took place on November 6, 1956, in order to elect the Governor of New Mexico. Incumbent Democrat John F. Simms ran for reelection to a second term but was defeated by former governor Edwin L. Mechem. This was the last gubernatorial election until 1994 in which a Republican carried Sandoval County.

== Primary election ==
=== Democratic primary ===
The Democratic primary was won by incumbent governor John F. Simms.

==== Results ====
New Mexico Democratic gubernatorial primary, 1956
Party	Candidate	Votes	%
Democratic	John F. Simms (incumbent)	46,722	48.30%
Democratic	Ingram B. Pickett	43,937	45.42%
Democratic	Robert F. Stephens	6,067	6.27%
Total votes		96,726	100.00%

=== Republican primary ===
The Republican primary was won by former governor Edwin L. Mechem.

==== Results ====
[data missing]

== General election ==
=== Results ===
1956 New Mexico gubernatorial election
Party	Candidate	Votes	%	±%
Republican	Edwin L. Mechem	131,488	52.23%	+9.24%
Democratic	John F. Simms (incumbent)	120,263	47.77%	−9.24%
Majority		11,225	4.46%	
Total votes		251,751	100.00%	
Republican gain from Democratic		Swing	+18.49%	

=== Results by county ===
County	Edwin L. Mechem Republican		John F. Simms Democratic		Margin		Total votes cast
County	#	%	#	%	#	%	Total votes cast
Bernalillo	38,207	59.02%	26,525	40.98%	11,682	18.05%	64,732
Catron	668	56.18%	521	43.82%	147	12.36%	1,189
Chaves	6,167	52.23%	5,640	47.77%	527	4.46%	11,807
Colfax	2,907	54.40%	2,437	45.60%	470	8.79%	5,344
Curry	4,371	52.38%	3,974	47.62%	397	4.76%	8,345
De Baca	652	50.15%	648	49.85%	4	0.31%	1,300
Doña Ana	6,476	54.50%	5,407	45.50%	1,069	9.00%	11,883
Eddy	5,346	37.10%	9,065	62.90%	-3,719	-25.81%	14,411
Grant	2,772	38.29%	4,467	61.71%	-1,695	-23.41%	7,239
Guadalupe	1,443	53.07%	1,276	46.93%	167	6.14%	2,719
Harding	632	57.82%	461	42.18%	171	15.65%	1,093
Hidalgo	589	37.93%	964	62.07%	-375	-24.15%	1,553
Lea	4,401	37.87%	7,220	62.13%	-2,819	-24.26%	11,621
Lincoln	1,790	59.59%	1,214	40.41%	576	19.17%	3,004
Los Alamos	1,689	36.69%	2,914	63.31%	-1,225	-26.61%	4,603
Luna	1,151	38.52%	1,837	61.48%	-686	-22.96%	2,988
McKinley	4,329	56.03%	3,397	43.97%	932	12.06%	7,726
Mora	1,736	58.59%	1,227	41.41%	509	17.18%	2,963
Otero	3,097	48.58%	3,278	51.42%	-181	-2.84%	6,375
Quay	2,095	48.60%	2,216	51.40%	-121	-2.81%	4,311
Rio Arriba	4,721	53.40%	4,119	46.60%	602	6.81%	8,840
Roosevelt	2,315	46.64%	2,649	53.36%	-334	-6.73%	4,964
San Juan	4,067	53.83%	3,488	46.17%	579	7.66%	7,555
San Miguel	4,984	54.54%	4,154	45.46%	830	9.08%	9,138
Sandoval	1,837	53.68%	1,585	46.32%	252	7.36%	3,422
Santa Fe	8,392	51.59%	7,875	48.41%	517	3.18%	16,267
Sierra	1,734	58.27%	1,242	41.73%	492	16.53%	2,976
Socorro	2,149	56.01%	1,688	43.99%	461	12.01%	3,837
Taos	3,162	54.19%	2,673	45.81%	489	8.38%	5,835
Torrance	1,461	53.01%	1,295	46.99%	166	6.02%	2,756
Union	1,394	50.42%	1,371	49.58%	23	0.83%	2,765
Valencia	4,754	58.05%	3,436	41.95%	1,318	16.09%	8,190
Total	131,488	52.23%	120,263	47.77%	11,225	4.46%	251,751

==== Counties that flipped from Democratic to Republican ====
- Bernalillo
- Chaves
- Colfax
- Curry
- De Baca
- Doña Ana
- Guadalupe
- McKinley
- Rio Arriba
- San Miguel
- Sandoval
- Santa Fe
- Sierra
- Socorro
- Taos
- Torrance
- Union
- Valencia
