= John Burroughs (New Mexico politician) =

18th Governor of New Mexico (1907–1978)

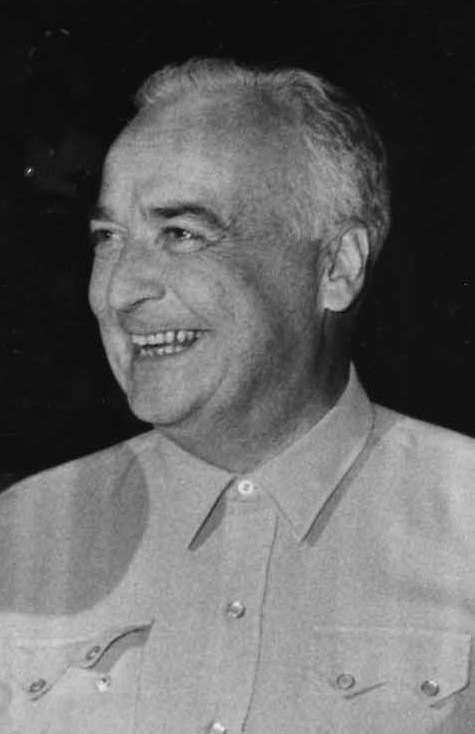

18th Governor of New Mexico
- In office January 1, 1959 – January 1, 1961
- Lieutenant: Ed V. Mead
- Preceded by: Edwin L. Mechem
- Succeeded by: Edwin L. Mechem

Member of the New Mexico House of Representatives
- In office January 1, 1957 – January 1, 1959

Personal details
- Born: April 7, 1907 Robert Lee, Texas, U.S.
- Died: May 21, 1978 (aged 71) Portales, New Mexico, U.S.
- Party: Democratic
- Profession: Businessman

John Burroughs (April 7, 1907 – May 21, 1978) was an American politician, educator, and businessman who served as the 18th governor of New Mexico. Burroughs, a Democrat, served one-term and is remembered for honest government and introduction of the concept of a state Personnel Act to improve the quality of state workers and limit somewhat the effect of political patronage.

== Early life and education ==
Burroughs was born in Robert Lee, Texas. He attended Texas Technological College (now Texas Tech University), where he played on the football team and was a member of the Agg Club, Tech Chamber of Commerce, stock judging team, and student council. He graduated in 1929 with a Bachelor of Science degree in Animal Husbandry, and later took graduate courses at Colorado State University.

== Career ==
He obtained his teaching certificate and, after several years of teaching agriculture in the New Mexico cities of Los Lunas and Clovis, went to work for an oil company located in the latter. In 1942 he entered the food processing industry. Eventually, he founded the "Cotton Oil Mill and Peanut Mill Company", which had branches in San Antonio, Texas, and Portales, New Mexico. His Texas plant made peanut butter.

A first time representative in the New Mexico legislature from Portales in 1957, Burroughs defeated incumbent Governor Edwin L. Mechem by less than one percent of the vote (103,481 to 101,567).

As governor, Burroughs stressed financial responsibility and pressed state officials to recover funds due and owing to the state. He created the New Mexico Department of Development incorporating the Tourist Bureau, the Economic Development Commission, and New Mexico Magazine under one authority. He was not re-elected. The next year he made a bid for the Democratic nomination for governor, but was stymied early in the process when his bid was quashed by the powerful Senator Clint Anderson. He ran again for governor in 1966, receiving the Democratic pre-primary convention endorsement, but was soundly defeated in the Democratic primary by Gene Lusk. Burroughs retired from politics, but still served on the New Mexico Finance Board under governors Bruce King and Jerry Apodaca.

Party political offices
Preceded by John F. Simms	Democratic nominee for Governor of New Mexico; 1958, 1960	Succeeded by Jack M. Campbell
Political offices
Preceded by Edwin L. Mechem	Governor of New Mexico; 1959–1961	Succeeded by Edwin L. Mechem
