= 1964 United States Senate election in New Mexico =

- November 3, 1964
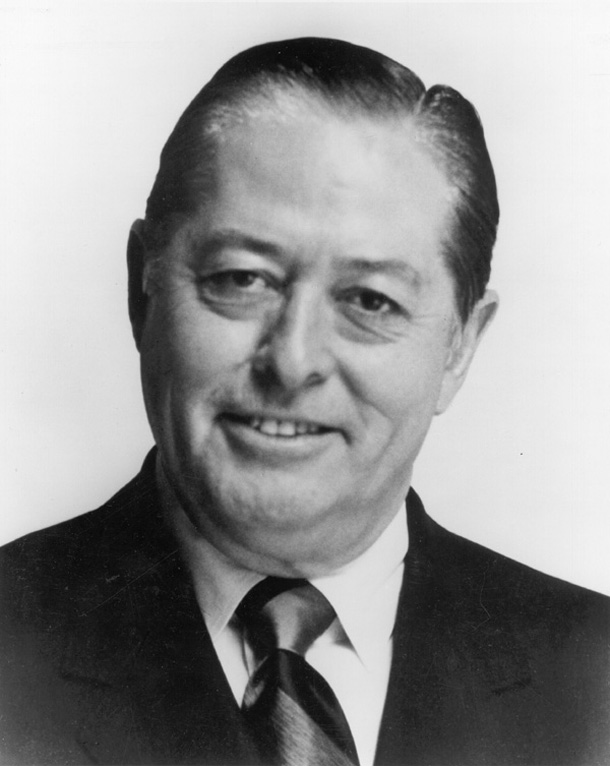

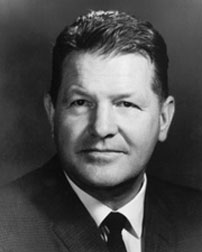
Nominee	Joseph Montoya	Edwin L. Mechem
Party	Democratic	Republican
Popular vote	178,209	147,562
Percentage	54.70%	45.30%
- County results Montoya: 50–60% 60–70% 70–80% Mechem: 50–60%
U.S. senator before election
Edwin L. Mechem
Republican
Elected U.S. Senator
Joseph Montoya
Democratic

The 1964 United States Senate election in New Mexico took place on November 3, 1964. Incumbent Republican U.S. Senator Edwin L. Mechem, who appointed himself to the office after the death of his predecessor, sought election to a full term. However, he was defeated by Democrat Joseph Montoya. Mechem was an ally of Arizona Senator and candidate for president Barry Goldwater who lost in a landslide on the same ballot. This and his very conservative voting record were widely seen as reasons for his loss.

== General election ==
=== Results ===
General election results
Party	Candidate	Votes	%
Democratic	Joseph Montoya	178,209	54.70
Republican	Edwin L. Mechem (inc.)	147,562	45.30
Majority		30,647	9.41%
Total votes		325,771	100.00
Democratic gain from Republican			

== See also ==
- 1964 United States Senate elections
