= J.R. Damron =

J.R. Damron was the Republican nominee for Governor of New Mexico in 2006.

== Governor Race Gone Awry ==
Damron announced his candidacy for governor in October 2005. In April 2006, Damron's wife, Barbara, was reportedly forced off the board of directors for Santa Fe’s St. Vincent Hospital, under threat that Governor Bill Richardson would veto funds for the hospital, because her husband was running for governor against Richardson.

Having won the primary election fairly, on June 17, 2006, he was pushed out of that position by the chairman of the New Mexico Republican Party, Allen Weh. John Dendahl, former party chairman, was appointed to run for governor as the Republican candidate. That was, although he had not received any votes to represent Republicans in New Mexico during the primary. Democrat Bill Richardson went on to win the general election for Governor of New Mexico in November 2006.

== Post-Gubernatorial Race Life ==
In 2013, Damron was elected chair of the New Mexico Health Exchange board of directors.
