= Mack Easley =

American judge

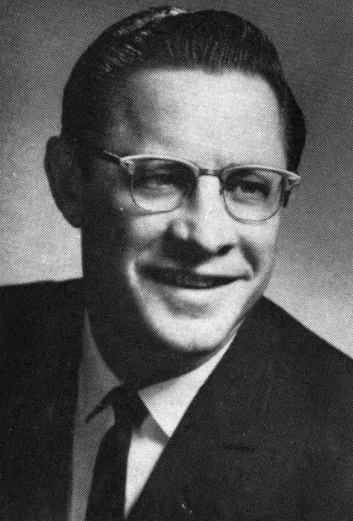

19th Lieutenant Governor of New Mexico
- In office January 1, 1963 – January 1, 1967
- Governor: Jack M. Campbell
- Preceded by: Tom Bolack
- Succeeded by: Lee Francis

Member of the New Mexico House of Representatives
- In office 1951–1953; 1955–1963

Personal details
- Born: October 14, 1916 Tahlequah, Oklahoma, U.S.
- Died: March 1, 2006 (aged 89) Albuquerque, New Mexico, U.S.
- Party: Democratic
- Spouse: Loyce Easley
- Children: 2
- Education: University of Oklahoma (LLB)

Mack Easley (October 14, 1916 – March 1, 2006) was an American politician and judge in New Mexico.

== Early life and education ==
Easley was born in Tahlequah, Oklahoma. He moved to Hobbs, New Mexico in 1947 after graduating from the University of Oklahoma College of Law.

== Career ==
After serving as assistant District Attorney, he was elected to the New Mexico House of Representatives, where he served five terms from 1951 to 1953 and 1955 to 1963. He also served Speaker of the House. In 1962, he was elected the 19th lieutenant governor of New Mexico and served for two terms (1963–1967) with Governor Jack Campbell. After returning to Hobbs to become its new State Senator, Governor Bruce King appointed him as a judge to the Fifth District Judge in 1974. In 1975, Governor Jerry Apodaca appointed Easley to a seat on the New Mexico Supreme Court vacated by the resignation of Donnan Stephenson, where he was elected to a second term. He retired in 1982 as chief justice.

== Family ==
Easley married artist Loyce Easley, with whom he had two children, Roger Easley and June Hudson.

Political offices
Preceded by Tom Bolack	Lieutenant Governor of New Mexico; 1963-1967	Succeeded by Lee Francis
