= John F. Simms =

American politician

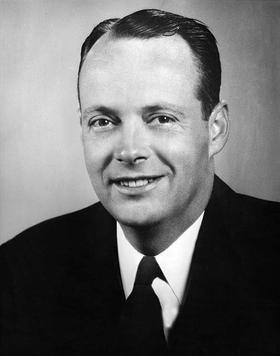

16th Governor of New Mexico
- In office January 1, 1955 – January 1, 1957
- Lieutenant: Joseph Montoya
- Preceded by: Edwin L. Mechem
- Succeeded by: Edwin L. Mechem

Speaker of the New Mexico House of Representatives
- In office 1949–1951
- Preceded by: H. Vearle Payne
- Succeeded by: Calvin Horn

Member of the New Mexico House of Representatives
- In office 1947–1951

Personal details
- Born: December 18, 1916 Albuquerque, New Mexico, US
- Died: April 11, 1975 (aged 58) Albuquerque, New Mexico, US
- Resting place: Fairview Memorial Park, Albuquerque, New Mexico
- Party: Democratic
- Spouse: Ruth Reynolds (m. 1940–1975, his death)
- Children: 5
- Education: University of New Mexico (BA); Yale University (LLB)
- Profession: Attorney, rancher
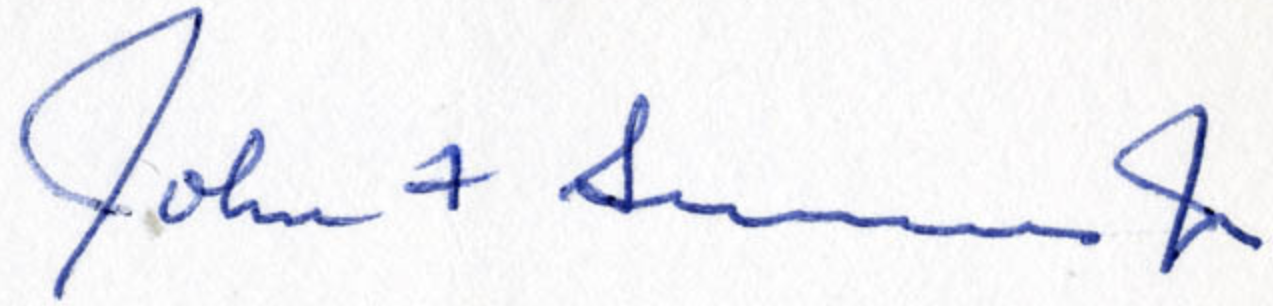
- Signature

Military service
- Branch/service: United States Army; United States Army Air Forces
- Battles/wars: World War II

John Field Simms Jr. (December 18, 1916 – April 11, 1975) was an American politician and lawyer from the state of New Mexico who served as the 16th governor of New Mexico.

== Early life and education ==
Simms was born in Albuquerque on December 18, 1916. He graduated from New Mexico Military Institute in 1933 and from the University of New Mexico in 1937. In 1940, he received his LL.B. degree from Yale Law School.

== Career ==
During World War II, Simms joined the United States Army Air Forces. He served until the end of the war, primarily in England, and carried out staff assignments at Eighth Air Force headquarters and Air Service Command headquarters. He was promoted to lieutenant colonel in June 1945, and left the service soon afterwards. Simms practiced law in addition to owning and operating his family's ranching business.

Simms ran successfully for the New Mexico House of Representatives in 1946 and 1948. He was chosen to serve as Speaker in his second term, and served from 1949 to 1951. From 1950 to 1954, Simms was a member of the New Mexico Commission for Promotion of Uniform State Laws.

In 1954, Simms was the successful Democratic nominee for governor. He served one term, 1955 to 1957 and presided over an increasing federal presence in the state. He also worked to make meetings of the state legislature more public and attempted to make the state government more accessible with initiatives including answering his own office phone. He was an unsuccessful candidate for reelection in 1956. After leaving office, Simms returned to his ranching interests and legal practice.

== Personal life ==
Simms was the son of Anne Clapton (Schluter) Simms and John F. Simms Sr. (1885–1954), who served as an associate justice of the New Mexico Supreme Court. In 1940, he married Ruth Reynolds (1915–1989), they were the parents of three sons and two daughters.

Simms died in Albuquerque, New Mexico on April 11, 1975. He was buried at Fairview Memorial Park in Albuquerque.

The John F. Simms Building, which is a part of the New Mexico State Capitol complex, is named for him.

In 1961 an episode of the television series Route 66, 'The Newborn', was filmed partially at his ranch according to the closing credits.

Party political offices
Preceded by Everett Grantham	Democratic nominee for Governor of New Mexico; 1954, 1956	Succeeded by John Burroughs
Political offices
Preceded by Edwin L. Mechem	Governor of New Mexico; 1955–1957	Succeeded by Edwin L. Mechem
