= Tom Bolack =

American politician (1918–1998)

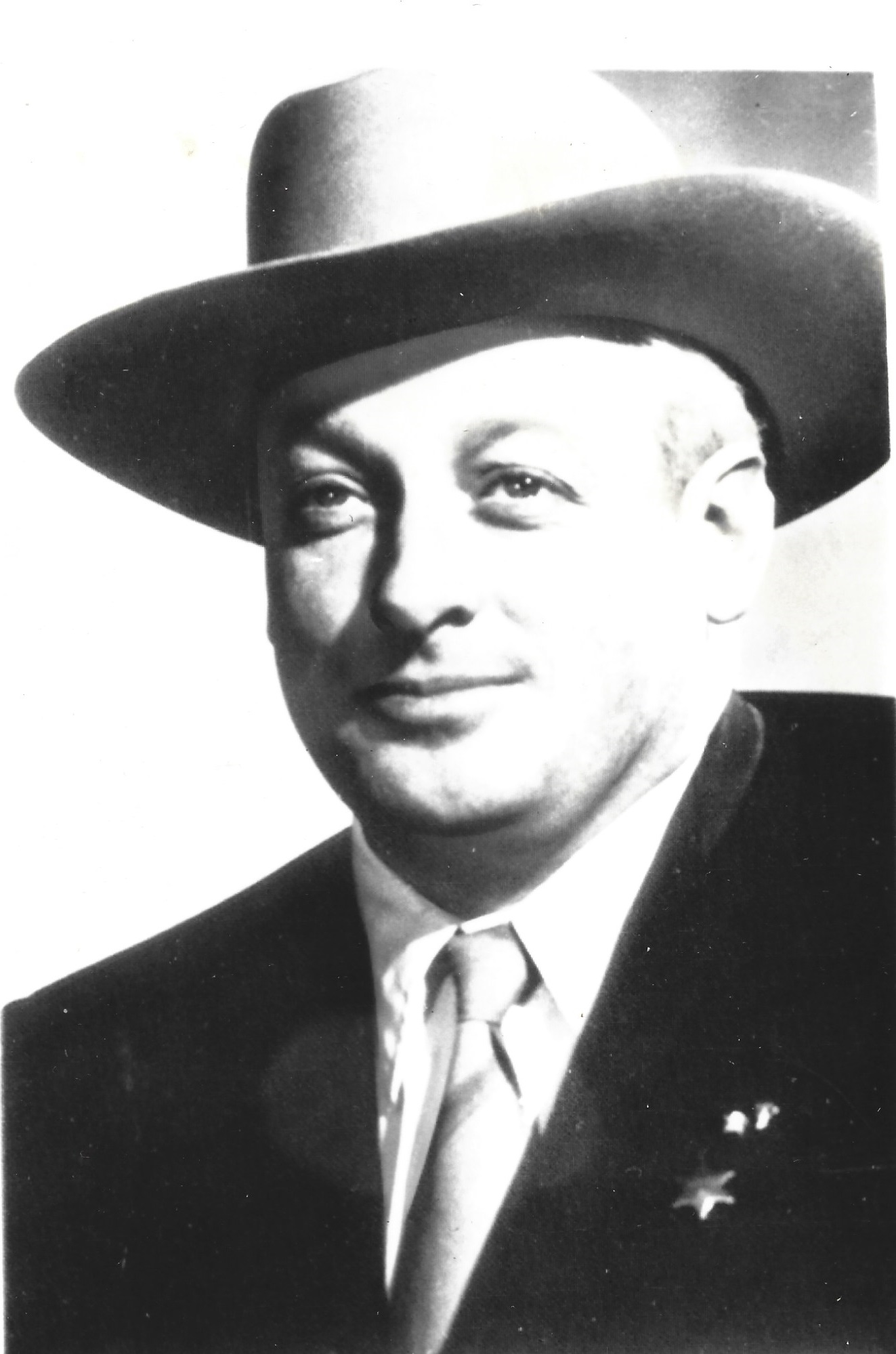
- Associated Press Wire Photo, December 11, 1962

20th Governor of New Mexico
- In office November 30, 1962 – January 1, 1963
- Lieutenant: Vacant
- Preceded by: Edwin L. Mechem
- Succeeded by: Jack M. Campbell

18th Lieutenant Governor of New Mexico
- In office January 1, 1961 – November 30, 1962
- Governor: Edwin L. Mechem
- Preceded by: Ed V. Mead
- Succeeded by: Mack Easley

Member of the New Mexico House of Representatives
- In office 1956–1958

Personal details
- Born: Tom Felix Bolack; May 18, 1918 Cowley County, Kansas, U.S.
- Died: May 20, 1998 (aged 80) Farmington, New Mexico, U.S.
- Party: Republican
- Profession: Oilman

Thomas Felix Bolack (May 18, 1918 – May 20, 1998) was an American businessman and politician who served as the 20th governor of New Mexico for 32 days in 1962–1963.

== Early life ==
On May 18, 1918, Bolack was born in Cowley County, Kansas. Bolack grew up on a farm.

== Career ==
Bolack was a self-educated oilman who learned geology from correspondence courses. He was also a rancher and owner of the Albuquerque Dukes minor-league baseball team from 1956 to 1963.

=== Politics ===
He was Mayor of Farmington, New Mexico from 1952 to 1954 and a member of the New Mexico House of Representatives from 1956 to 1958. In 1957 he unsuccessfully ran for election to the U.S. House of Representatives, losing soundly to Joseph Montoya.

=== Lieutenant Governor ===
In 1960, Bolack was elected lieutenant governor by a margin of 279 votes, becoming the first Republican lieutenant governor in New Mexico since 1928. That Bolack, an "Anglo" (or New Mexican not of Spanish or Indian descent), was able to defeat a candidate with Spanish ancestry in statewide elections was seen as one of several signs of the decline of the influence of long-time United States Senator Dennis Chavez. Democrats challenged the narrow victory, on the basis that some voters on Navajo reservations should have been required to vote outside of their reservations, but the New Mexico Supreme Court ruled in Bolack's favor.

=== Governor ===
Governor Edwin L. Mechem was defeated in his bid for re-election and, when he resigned on November 30, 1962, Bolack became governor, serving the remainder of Mechem's term. Bolack, in his first act as governor, appointed Mechem to fill the vacancy in the United States Senate caused by the recent death of Dennis Chavez. Bolack served as governor until newly elected Governor Jack M. Campbell was sworn in on January 1, 1963.

In 1976, Bolack co-chaired a bipartisan group that aimed to reform New Mexico's election legislation, after the state was included on a list of several states with unfair elections. In addition to lobbying for reform, the group offered $1,000 to anyone providing information leading to the arrest of an election-law violator.

== Personal life ==
Bolack's wife was Alice (née Schwerdtfeger) Bolack. They had three children.

=== Death ===
In 1985, Bolack suffered a stroke and had to use a wheelchair. On May 20, 1998, Bolack died in Farmington, New Mexico. Bolack's body was cremated and his ashes were scattered over his Farmington ranch using 16 specially-made fireworks on Fourth of July, 1999.

=== Legacy ===
Bolack's ranch is now the site of the Bolack Museum of Fish and Wildlife, which displays over 4,000 stuffed animals including many of rare species. Bolack, an accomplished big-game hunter and recipient of Safari Club International's Fourth Pinnacle of Achievement Award, shot most of the animals in the collection himself.

The Tom Bolack Urban Forest Park in Albuquerque is named in his honor.

Political offices
Preceded by James B. Jones	Lieutenant Governor of New Mexico; 1961–1962	Succeeded by Mack Easley
Preceded by Edwin L. Mechem	Governor of New Mexico; 1962–1963	Succeeded by Jack M. Campbell
