= John Dendahl =

American businessman, politician, and cross-country skier

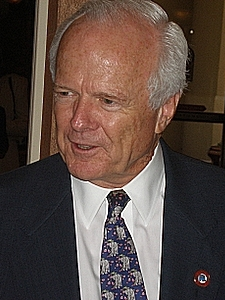

Chairman of the New Mexico Republican Party
- In office 1994–2003

Personal details
- Born: September 28, 1938 Santa Fe, New Mexico, U.S.
- Died: November 9, 2013 (aged 75) Denver, Colorado, U.S.
- Party: Republican
- Education: University of Colorado, Boulder (BS)

John Dendahl (September 28, 1938 – November 9, 2013) was an American business executive, Republican politician, and syndicated columnist from New Mexico. While attending the University of Colorado, he led two NCAA champion skiing teams, won three individual NCAA titles and was a member of the U.S. ski team at the 1960 Winter Olympics. He was inducted into the University of Colorado Athletic Hall of Fame and the New Mexico Ski Hall of Fame.

== Childhood and education ==
Dendahl was born September 28, 1938, in Santa Fe, New Mexico where his great grandparents emigrated from Germany in the 1870s. His parents were John D. and Eleanor (née Hoge) Dendahl. The elder Dendahl owned a merchant business established in 1901 by his grandfather, Johann, and operated by the family for three generations.

Dendahl attended public schools and graduated from Santa Fe High School in 1956. He attended the University of Colorado in Boulder and graduated in 1961 with bachelor's degrees in electrical engineering (electronics) and business administration (finance). He was a member of Phi Gamma Delta fraternity and was the university's Outstanding Senior Athlete in 1960. He was also a cross-country skier on the 1960 U.S. Olympic team in Squaw Valley.

== Business history ==
Following college graduation, Dendahl joined Eberline Instrument Corporation (a subsidiary of Thermo Electron Corporation) full-time as an engineer for whom he later became chief financial officer and then CEO. Later, Dendahl was the first chief financial officer of the then-new Santa Fe campus of St. John's College. In 1983, Dendahl became general manager of a partnership owning more than 20,000 acres of undeveloped land near Santa Fe. Then in 1985, he started a term as president of The First National Bank of Santa Fe during which time the bank suffered from loan quality problems and was put under special supervision by the Comptroller of the Currency a few months after Dendahl had taken his office. Improvements under the management of Dendahl and his colleagues led to termination of the special supervision in 364 days.

During and after his business career, Dendahl served on the boards of directors of numerous charitable organizations, including United Way, Sangre de Cristo Girl Scout Council, New Mexico Association of Commerce and Industry, the Santa Fe Opera, Santa Fe Preparatory School, School of American Research (now School for Advanced Research), Mountain States Legal Foundation (MSLF), and St. John's College. Dendahl was chairman of the board for St. John's College for two years.

== Political history ==
Dendahl served as New Mexico's Secretary of Economic Development and Tourism from 1988 to 1990 a position he was appointed to by Governor Garrey Carruthers. During the year prior to that appointment, Dendahl was a Carruthers appointee on the N.M. State Investment Council. In 1994 Dendahl unsuccessfully sought the Republican nomination for Governor losing to Gary Johnson. In late 1994 Dendahl was elected Chairman of the New Mexico Republican Party, a position he held until 2003.

== Race for governor - 2006 ==
Dendahl was the Republican candidate for Governor of New Mexico in the 2006 election. He became so on June 17, 2006, when Dr. J.R. Damron, the unopposed Republican who won the primary election, withdrew from the election due to a lack of funds after strong encouragement to do so by the Republican party chairman Allen Weh. In accordance with state law, the Republican Party's state central committee met to name a replacement. Dendahl was the only person nominated and became the party's general election nominee. Along with lieutenant governor candidate Sue Wilson Beffort, Dendahl ran against and lost the election to the incumbent Democratic ticket of Governor Bill Richardson and Lieutenant Governor Diane Denish.

== Later years ==
Upon retiring from New Mexico politics in 2007, Dendahl lived with his wife Jackie in Roxborough Park, Colorado just south of Denver. In 2011, Dendahl became a candidate for the Intermountain Rural Electric Association (IREA) Board of Directors, but he failed to unseat the incumbent director Mike Kempe, who won by 61.45% to Dendahl's 38.54%. Dendahl died in Denver on November 9, 2013.

Party political offices
Preceded by John Sanchez	Republican nominee for Governor of New Mexico; 2006	Succeeded by Susana Martinez
