= David W. Carmody =

American judge (1908–1976)

Chief Justice of the New Mexico Supreme Court
- In office 1965–1966

Justice of the New Mexico Supreme Court
- In office January 1, 1959 – April 30, 1969
- Preceded by: W. Morris Shillinglaw
- Succeeded by: John T. Watson

Personal details
- Born: David Wetherill Carmody; April 22, 1908 Denver, Colorado, U.S.
- Died: April 25, 1976 (aged 68) Bradenton, Florida, U.S.
- Spouse: Hazel (died 1970)
- Parent(s): Thomas E. Carmody; Mary Jane McBride
- Education: University of Colorado (AB, LLB)
- Profession: Judge

David Wetherill Carmody (April 22, 1908 – April 25, 1976) was a justice of the New Mexico Supreme Court from January 1, 1959, until his retirement on April 30, 1969. He served as chief justice in 1965 and 1966.

== Early life, education, and career ==
Born in Denver, Colorado to Thomas E. Carmody, a physician, and Mary Jane (McBride) Carmody, David W. Carmody attended the Denver public schools, and received an A.B. from the University of Colorado in 1931, and LL.B. from the same institution in 1933. After gaining admission to the bar in New Mexico in 1935, Carmody served as a district attorney from 1937 to 1947, when Governor Mabry appointed Carmody to a seat on the New Mexico First Judicial District. Carmody served in that office until 1959, also serving as president of the Judicial Council of New Mexican Judges from 1953 to 1955.

== Supreme court service ==
In 1958, Carmody was elected to the New Mexico Supreme Court, an event that began a transition to a substantially new membership for the court. During his time on the court, "Carmody, an active proponent of judicial reform, pushed for voter ratification of the amendment" to create an intermediate court of appeals.

Carmody was reelected without opposition in 1966, retiring from the court on April 30, 1969, due to issues with his health and eye problems. His retirement, like his initial election, was part of a substantial turnover in court membership. Following his retirement, Carmody served as a delegate to the 1969 New Mexico Constitutional Convention.

== Personal life and death ==
Carmody's first wife, Hazel, died in 1970, after which Carmody moved to Bradenton, Florida, where he remarried and resided until his death.

Political offices
Preceded by W. Morris Shillinglaw	Justice of the New Mexico Supreme Court; 1959–1969	Succeeded by John T. Watson
