= John T. Watson =

American judge (1908–2007)

Justice of the New Mexico Supreme Court
- In office May 29, 1969 – December 31, 1970
- Nominated by: David Cargo
- Preceded by: David W. Carmody
- Succeeded by: Kenneth B. Wilson

Personal details
- Born: 1908 Michigan
- Died: September 7, 2007 (aged 98–99)
- Spouses: Jane Graham McCabe; Mirth Hansen
- Children: 2
- Parent: John C. Watson (father)

John T. Watson (1908 – September 7, 2007) was a justice of the New Mexico Supreme Court from May 29, 1969 until December 31, 1970. He left office after losing in the primary.

== Early life ==
Born in Michigan, Watson came with his family to Deming, New Mexico at the age of five. He attended the local schools and received an undergraduate degree from the University of New Mexico in 1929, followed by a law degree at the University of Colorado Law School in 1934. He practiced law for various periods in Albuquerque, and Santa Fe, the latter in partnership with his father.

=== Military career ===
Watson served in the United States Army in the European theatre of World War II, and in the Korean War.

== Career ==
On May 23rd, 1969, governor David Cargo nominated Watson to a seat on the New Mexico Supreme Court Vacated by the retirement of Justice David W. Carmody. Watson's father, John C. Watson, served on the New Mexico Supreme Court in the 1920s and 1930s.

== Personal life ==
In 1936, Watson married Jane Graham McCabe, with whom he had two sons. Jane died in 1984, and Watson was later in a relationship with Mirth Hansen for the last 22 years of his life. Watson died at the age of 99.

Political offices
Preceded by David W. Carmody	Justice of the New Mexico Supreme Court; 1969–1970	Succeeded by Donnan Stephenson
