= 1958 New Mexico gubernatorial election =

- November 4, 1958
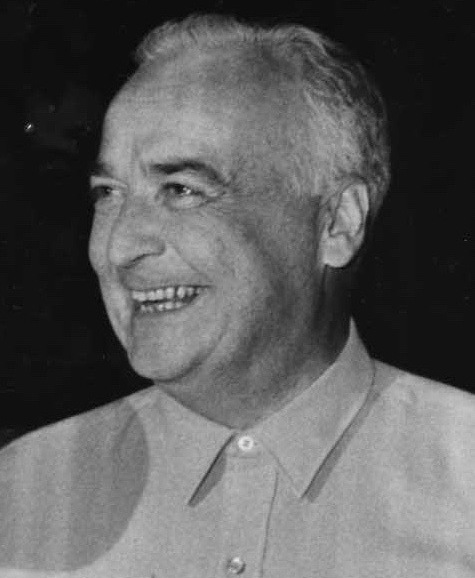

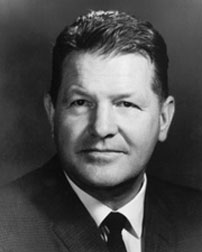
Nominee	John Burroughs	Edwin L. Mechem
Party	Democratic	Republican
Popular vote	103,481	101,567
Percentage	50.47%	49.53%
- County results Burroughs: 50–60% 60–70% 70–80% Mechem: 50–60% 60–70%
Governor before election
Edwin L. Mechem
Republican
Elected Governor
John Burroughs
Democratic

The 1958 New Mexico gubernatorial election took place on November 4, 1958, in order to elect the Governor of New Mexico. Incumbent Republican Edwin L. Mechem ran for reelection to a fourth term against Democrat John Burroughs. Burroughs narrowly defeated Mechem in the state's closest gubernatorial election since 1924. Mechem was the last Republican to carry Guadalupe County until Susana Martinez in 2010.

== Primary election ==
=== Democratic primary ===
The Democratic primary was won by state representative John Burroughs. Former Attorney General Robert C. Dow unsuccessfully sought the nomination.

=== Candidates ===
- John Burroughs, State Representative (1957-1959)
- Joseph Bursey, former director of the New Mexico Bureau of Tourism
- Ingram B. Pickett, state Corporation Commissioner
- Robert C. Dow, former New Mexico Attorney General (1927-1928)
- Cole Moffett, real estate broker

==== Results ====
Democratic primary results
Party	Candidate	Votes	%
Democratic	John Burroughs	46,344	43.76%
Democratic	Joseph Bursey	33,623	31.75%
Democratic	Ingram B. Pickett	18,150	17.14%
Democratic	Robert C. Dow	5,569	5.26%
Democratic	Cole Moffet	2,207	2.08%
Total votes		105,893	100.00%

=== Republican primary ===
The Republican primary was won by incumbent governor Edwin L. Mechem.

==== Results ====
[data missing]

== General election ==
=== Results ===
1958 New Mexico gubernatorial election
Party	Candidate	Votes	%	±%
Democratic	John Burroughs	103,481	50.47%	+2.70%
Republican	Edwin L. Mechem (incumbent)	101,567	49.53%	−2.70%
Majority		1,914	0.93%	
Total votes		205,048	100.00%	
Democratic gain from Republican		Swing	+5.39%	

=== Results by county ===
County	John Burroughs Democratic		Edwin L. Mechem Republican		Margin		Total votes cast
County	#	%	#	%	#	%	Total votes cast
Bernalillo	19,641	39.37%	30,246	60.63%	-10,605	-21.26%	49,887
Catron	496	47.15%	556	52.85%	-60	-5.70%	1,052
Chaves	4,639	50.74%	4,504	49.26%	135	1.48%	9,143
Colfax	2,213	49.11%	2,293	50.89%	-80	-1.78%	4,506
Curry	3,001	51.89%	2,782	48.11%	219	3.79%	5,783
De Baca	496	49.95%	497	50.05%	-1	-0.10%	993
Doña Ana	5,287	55.83%	4,183	44.17%	1,104	11.66%	9,470
Eddy	7,131	64.95%	3,849	35.05%	3,282	29.89%	10,980
Grant	4,013	70.07%	1,714	29.93%	2,299	40.14%	5,727
Guadalupe	1,248	49.17%	1,290	50.83%	-42	-1.65%	2,538
Harding	444	44.89%	545	55.11%	-101	-10.21%	989
Hidalgo	749	62.21%	455	37.79%	294	24.42%	1,204
Lea	5,662	74.52%	1,936	25.48%	3,726	49.04%	7,598
Lincoln	1,153	44.26%	1,452	55.74%	-299	-11.48%	2,605
Los Alamos	2,060	53.49%	1,791	46.51%	269	6.99%	3,851
Luna	1,687	64.46%	930	35.54%	757	28.93%	2,617
McKinley	3,406	48.95%	3,552	51.05%	-146	-2.10%	6,958
Mora	1,124	42.79%	1,503	57.21%	-379	-14.43%	2,627
Otero	2,844	53.27%	2,495	46.73%	349	6.54%	5,339
Quay	2,410	66.23%	1,229	33.77%	1,181	32.45%	3,639
Rio Arriba	3,778	46.16%	4,406	53.84%	-628	-7.67%	8,184
Roosevelt	3,195	69.16%	1,425	30.84%	1,770	38.31%	4,620
San Juan	2,844	47.94%	3,089	52.06%	-245	-4.13%	5,933
San Miguel	4,224	51.38%	3,997	48.62%	227	2.76%	8,221
Sandoval	1,661	51.01%	1,595	48.99%	66	2.03%	3,256
Santa Fe	6,508	46.66%	7,439	53.34%	-931	-6.68%	13,947
Sierra	1,199	46.71%	1,368	53.29%	-169	-6.58%	2,567
Socorro	1,858	53.36%	1,624	46.64%	234	6.72%	3,482
Taos	2,315	47.20%	2,590	52.80%	-275	-5.61%	4,905
Torrance	1,258	50.32%	1,242	49.68%	16	0.64%	2,500
Union	1,279	53.40%	1,116	46.60%	163	6.81%	2,395
Valencia	3,658	48.57%	3,874	51.43%	-216	-2.87%	7,532
Total	103,481	50.47%	101,567	49.53%	1,914	0.93%	205,048

==== Counties that flipped from Republican to Democratic ====
- Chaves
- Curry
- Doña Ana
- San Miguel
- Sandoval
- Socorro
- Torrance
- Union
