= 1962 New Mexico gubernatorial election =

- November 6, 1962
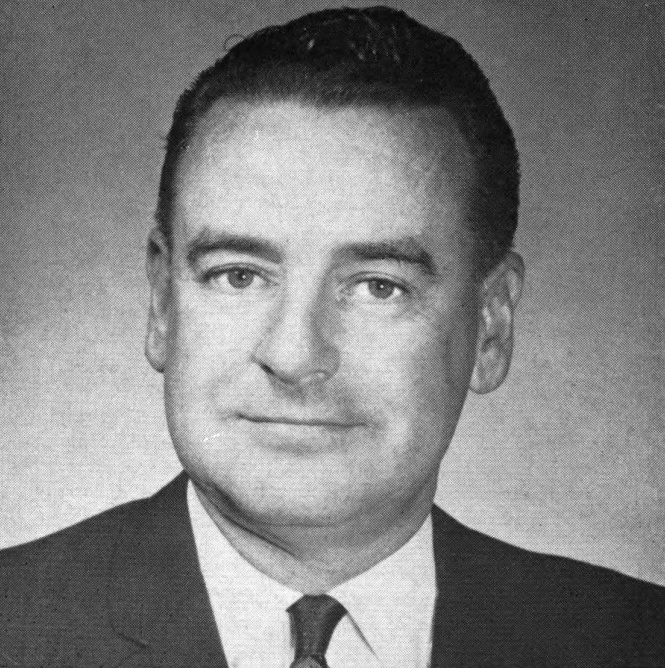

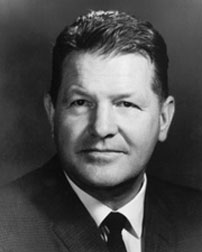
Nominee	Jack M. Campbell	Edwin L. Mechem
Party	Democratic	Republican
Popular vote	130,933	116,174
Percentage	52.98%	47.01%
- County results Campbell: 50–60% 60–70% Mechem: 50–60%
Governor before election
Edwin L. Mechem
Republican
Elected Governor
Jack M. Campbell
Democratic

The 1962 New Mexico gubernatorial election took place on November 6, 1962, to elect the Governor of New Mexico. Incumbent Republican Edwin L. Mechem ran for reelection for a sixth term against Democrat Jack Campbell. Campbell defeated Mechem by a decisive six point margin.

== Primary election ==
=== Democratic primary ===
The Democratic primary was won by state representative Jack M. Campbell.

==== Results ====
Democratic primary results
Party	Candidate	Votes	%
Democratic	Jack M. Campbell	47,873	38.73%
Democratic	Ed V. Mead	44,385	35.90%
Democratic	Leo T. Murphy	28,755	23.26%
Democratic	Clarence W. Via	2,611	2.11%
Total votes		123,624	100.00%

=== Republican primary ===
Incumbent governor Edwin L. Mechem was unopposed in the Republican primary.

== General election ==
=== Results ===
1962 New Mexico gubernatorial election
Party	Candidate	Votes	%	±%
Democratic	Jack M. Campbell	130,933	52.98%	+3.31%
Republican	Edwin L. Mechem (incumbent)	116,174	47.01%	−3.31%
	Scattering	18	0.01%	
Majority		14,749	5.97%	
Total votes		247,135	100.00%	
Democratic gain from Republican		Swing	+6.62%	

=== Results by county ===
County	Jack M. Campbell Democratic		Edwin L. Mechem Republican		Margin		Total votes cast
County	#	%	#	%	#	%	Total votes cast
Bernalillo	34,383	50.86%	33,210	49.12%	1,173	1.74%	67,605 (Note: Includes 12 write-in votes)
Catron	444	40.36%	656	69.64%	-212	-19.27%	1,100
Chaves	5,134	40.99%	7,391	59.01%	-2,257	-18.02%	12,526 (Note: Includes 1 write-in vote)
Colfax	2,754	58.60%	1,946	41.40%	808	17.19%	4,700
Curry	3,411	47.49%	3,771	52.51%	-360	-5.01%	7,182
De Baca	557	49.91%	559	50.09%	-2	-0.18%	1,116
Doña Ana	6,343	50.19%	6,296	49.81%	47	0.37%	12,639
Eddy	8,557	61.76%	5,295	38.22%	3,262	23.54%	13,855 (Note: Includes 3 write-in votes)
Grant	3,288	58.29%	2,353	41.71%	935	16.58%	5,641
Guadalupe	1,448	56.70%	1,106	43.30%	342	13.39%	2,554
Harding	396	43.66%	511	56.34%	-115	-12.68%	907
Hidalgo	771	57.20%	577	42.80%	194	14.39%	1,348
Lea	6,167	56.50%	4,748	43.50%	1,419	13.00%	10,915
Lincoln	1,349	44.92%	1,654	55.08%	-305	-10.16%	3,003
Los Alamos	2,356	55.34%	1,901	44.66%	455	10.69%	4,257
Luna	1,537	53.95%	1,312	46.05%	225	7.90%	2,849
McKinley	3,694	56.79%	2,811	43.21%	883	13.57%	6,505
Mora	1,166	45.30%	1,408	54.70%	-242	-9.40%	2,574
Otero	3,360	50.47%	3,296	49.50%	64	0.96%	6,658 (Note: Includes 2 write-in votes)
Quay	1,972	52.38%	1,793	47.62%	179	4.75%	3,765
Rio Arriba	5,334	62.91%	3,145	37.09%	2,189	25.82%	8,479
Roosevelt	1,921	45.88%	2,266	54.12%	-345	-8.24%	4,187
San Juan	5,193	53.23%	4,562	46.77%	631	6.47%	9,755
San Miguel	4,541	56.87%	3,444	43.13%	1,097	13.74%	7,985
Sandoval	2,317	65.03%	1,246	34.97%	1,071	30.06%	3,563
Santa Fe	8,812	55.16%	7,162	44.84%	1,650	10.33%	15,974
Sierra	1,337	50.74%	1,298	49.26%	39	1.48%	2,635
Socorro	1,888	54.28%	1,590	45.72%	298	8.57%	3,478
Taos	2,942	53.80%	2,526	46.20%	416	7.61%	5,468
Torrance	1,261	50.66%	1,228	49.34%	33	1.33%	2,489
Union	1,207	50.71%	1,173	49.29%	34	1.43%	2,380
Valencia	5,093	56.32%	3,950	43.68%	1,143	12.64%	9,043
Total	130,933	52.98%	116,814	47.01%	14,749	5.97%	247,135

==== Counties that flipped from Republican to Democratic ====
- Bernalillo
- Doña Ana
- Los Alamos
- Quay
- San Juan
- Santa Fe
- Union

==== Counties that flipped from Democratic to Republican ====
- Roosevelt
