= Bill Richardson =

American politician (1947–2023)

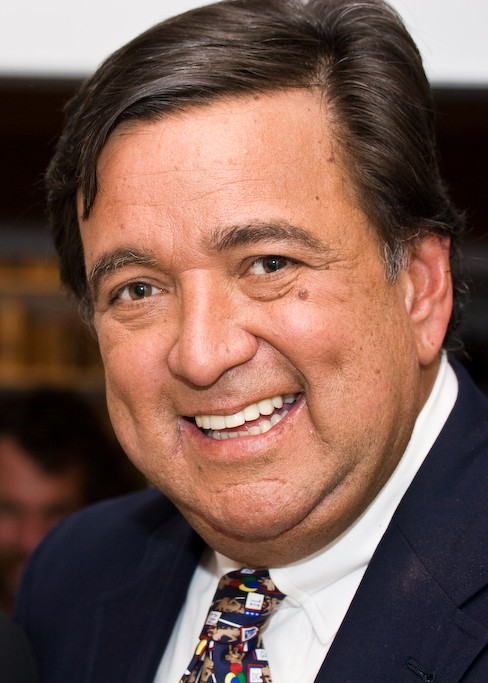
- Richardson in 2006

30th Governor of New Mexico
- In office January 1, 2003 – January 1, 2011
- Lieutenant: Diane Denish
- Preceded by: Gary Johnson
- Succeeded by: Susana Martinez

9th United States Secretary of Energy
- In office August 18, 1998 – January 20, 2001
- President: Bill Clinton
- Preceded by: Federico Peña
- Succeeded by: Spencer Abraham

21st United States Ambassador to the United Nations
- In office February 18, 1997 – August 18, 1998
- President: Bill Clinton
- Preceded by: Madeleine Albright
- Succeeded by: Richard Holbrooke

Member of the U.S. House of Representatives from New Mexico's 3rd district
- In office January 3, 1983 – February 13, 1997
- Preceded by: Constituency established
- Succeeded by: Bill Redmond

Personal details
- Born: William Blaine Richardson III; November 15, 1947 Pasadena, California, U.S.
- Died: September 1, 2023 (aged 75) Chatham, Massachusetts, U.S.
- Party: Democratic
- Spouse: Barbara Flavin (m. 1972)
- Education: Tufts University (BA, MA)

William Blaine Richardson III (November 15, 1947 – September 1, 2023) was an American politician, author, and diplomat who served as the 30th governor of New Mexico from 2003 to 2011. He was U.S. ambassador to the United Nations and energy secretary in the Clinton administration, a U.S. congressman, chair of the 2004 Democratic National Convention, and chair of the Democratic Governors Association (DGA).

In December 2008, Richardson was nominated for the cabinet position of Secretary of Commerce in the first Obama administration but withdrew a month later, as he was being investigated for possible improper business dealings. Although the investigation was later dropped, it damaged Richardson's popularity and diminished his influence as his second and final term as New Mexico governor concluded.

Richardson occasionally provided advice on diplomatic issues pertaining to North Korea and visited the nation on several occasions, including efforts to release American detainees. He completed a number of private humanitarian missions, one of which secured the release of U.S. journalist Danny Fenster from a Myanmar prison in November 2021.

== Early life and education ==
William Blaine Richardson III was born in Pasadena, California, on November 15, 1947. He grew up in the borough of Coyoacán in Mexico City. His father, William Blaine Richardson Jr. (1891–1972), who was of Anglo-American and Mexican descent, was an American bank executive from Boston who worked in Mexico for what is now Citibank. Richardson's father was born on a ship heading towards Nicaragua.

His mother, María Luisa López-Collada Márquez (1914–2011), had been his father's secretary—she was the Mexican-born daughter of a Mexican mother and a Spanish father from Villaviciosa, Asturias. Just before Bill Richardson was born, his father sent his mother to California to give birth because, as Richardson explained, "My father had a complex about not having been born in the United States."

Richardson, a United States citizen by birth, spent his childhood in a lavish hacienda in Coyoacán's barrio of San Francisco where he was raised as a Roman Catholic. When Richardson was 13, his parents sent him to the U.S. to attend Middlesex School, a preparatory school in Concord, Massachusetts, where he played baseball as a pitcher. He entered Tufts University in 1966, where he continued to play baseball.

In 1967, he played collegiate summer baseball in the Cape Cod Baseball League, pitching for the Cotuit Kettleers; he returned to the league in 1968 with the Harwich Mariners. A Kettleers program included the words "Drafted by K.C." Richardson said:

When I saw that program in 1967, I was convinced I was drafted.... And it stayed with me all these years.

Richardson's original biographies stated he had been drafted by the Kansas City Athletics and the Chicago Cubs to play professional baseball, but a 2005 Albuquerque Journal investigation discovered he never was on any official draft. Richardson acknowledged the error, which he maintained was unintentional, saying he had been scouted by several teams and told that he "would or could" be drafted, but he was mistaken in saying that he actually had been drafted.

Richardson earned a Bachelor's degree at Tufts University in 1970, majoring in French and political science, and was a member and president of Delta Tau Delta fraternity. He earned a master's degree in international affairs from the Tufts University Fletcher School of Law and Diplomacy in 1971. He had met his future wife Barbara (née Flavin) when they were in high school in Concord, Massachusetts, and they married in 1972 following her graduation from Wheaton College.

Richardson was a descendant of William Brewster, a passenger on the Mayflower.

== Early political career ==
After college, Richardson worked for Republican Congressman F. Bradford Morse from Massachusetts from 1971 to 1973. In 1974, he left to work on congressional relations for the Kissinger State Department during the Nixon administration. Between 1976 and 1978 he was a staff member for the Senate Foreign Relations Committee.

== U.S. Representative (1983–1997) ==
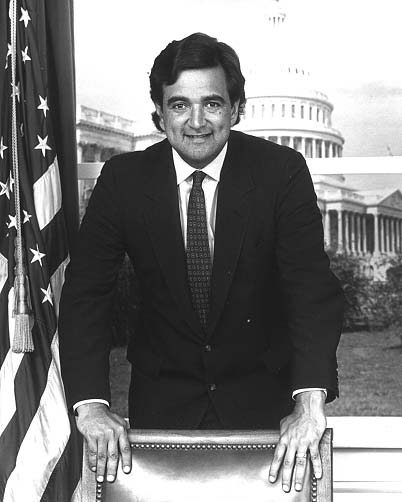
As a congressman

In 1978, Richardson moved to Santa Fe, New Mexico. In 1980 he ran for the House of Representatives in the state's 1st congressional district, but lost narrowly to longtime Republican incumbent and future United States Secretary of the Interior Manuel Lujan. Two years later, Richardson was elected to New Mexico's newly created third district, which took in most of the northern part of the state. Richardson spent 14 years in Congress, representing the country's most diverse district and holding 2,000 town meetings.

Richardson served as Chair of the Congressional Hispanic Caucus in the 98th Congress (1984–1985) and as Chair of the House Natural Resources Subcommittee on Native American Affairs in the 103rd Congress (1993–1994). Richardson sponsored a number of bills, including the American Indian Religious Freedom Act Amendments of 1994, the Indian Dams Safety Act, the Tribal Self-Governance Act, and the Jicarilla Apache Tribe Water Rights Settlement Act.

He became a member of the Democratic leadership as a deputy majority whip, where he became friends with Bill Clinton after they worked closely on several issues, including when he served as the ranking House Democrat in favor of NAFTA's passage in 1993. For his work as a back channel to Carlos Salinas de Gortari, Mexico's president at the time of the negotiations, he was awarded the Aztec Eagle Award, Mexico's highest award for a foreigner. Clinton in turn sent Richardson on various foreign policy missions, including a trip in 1995 in which Richardson traveled to Baghdad with Peter Bourne and engaged in lengthy one-on-one negotiations with Saddam Hussein to secure the release of two American aerospace workers who had been captured by the Iraqis after wandering over the Kuwaiti border. Richardson also visited Nicaragua, Guatemala, Cuba, Peru, India, North Korea, Bangladesh, Nigeria, and Sudan to represent U.S. interests and met with Slobodan Milošević.

In 1996, he played a major role in securing the release of American Evan Hunziker from North Korean custody and for securing a pardon for Eliadah McCord, an American convicted and imprisoned in Bangladesh. Due to these missions, Richardson was nominated for the Nobel Peace Prize three times.

== Ambassador to the United Nations (1997–1998) ==
Richardson served as U.S. Ambassador to the United Nations from February 1997 to August 1998. In 1997, working alongside Nelson Mandela, he helped negotiate the transfer of power between Mobutu Sese Seko and Laurent-Désiré Kabila at the conclusion of the First Congo War. In 1998 he flew to Afghanistan to meet with the Taliban and Abdul Rachid Dostum, an Uzbek warlord. The ceasefire he believed he had negotiated with the help of Bruce Riedel of the National Security Council failed to hold; neither was he successful in convincing the Taliban to hand over Osama bin Laden.

== U.S. Secretary of Energy (1998–2001) ==
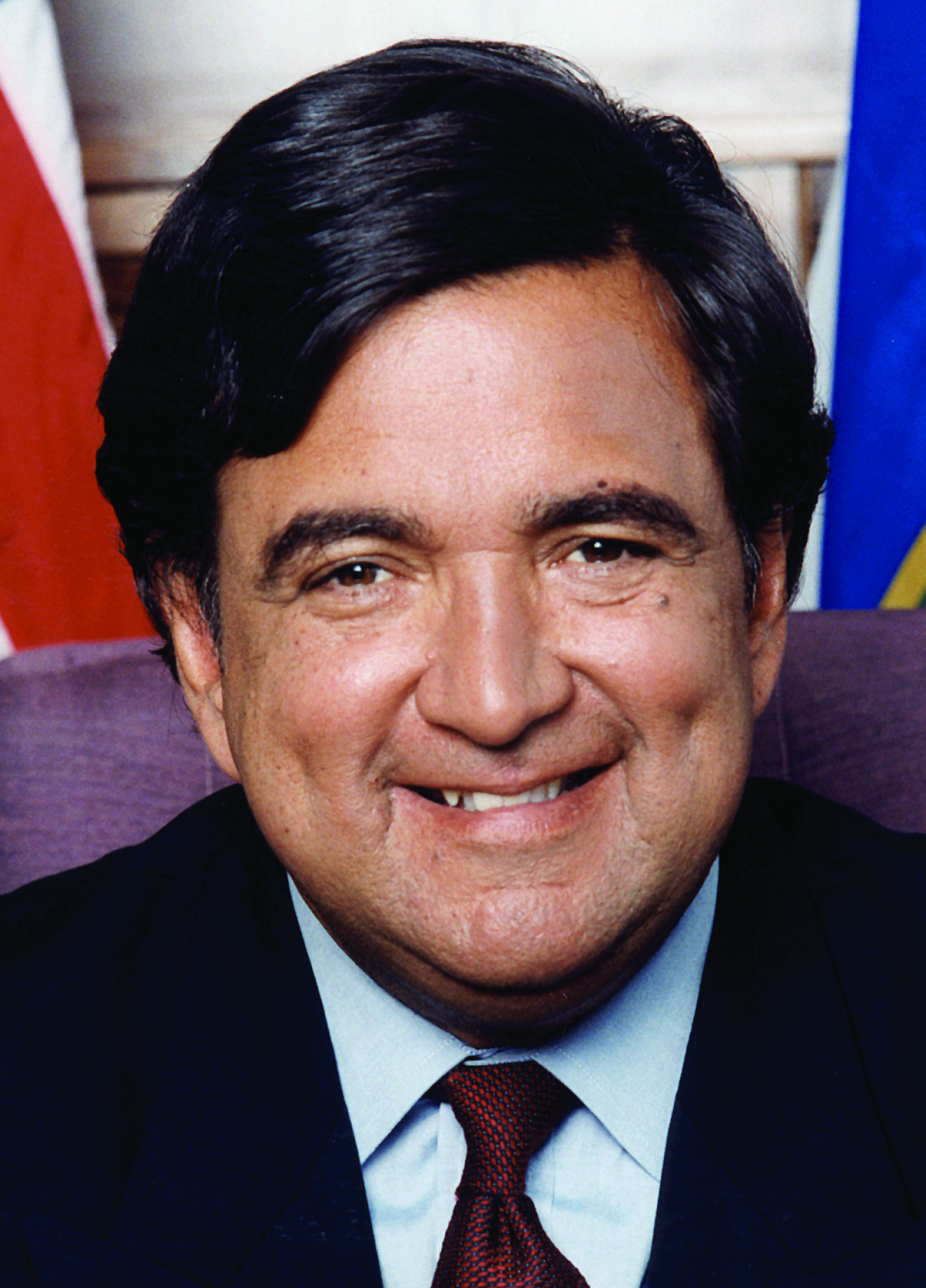
As Secretary of Energy

The Senate confirmed Richardson to be Clinton's Secretary of Energy on July 31, 1998. His tenure at the Department of Energy was marred by the Wen Ho Lee nuclear controversy. As told by The New York Times in a special report, a scientist later named as Lee at the Los Alamos National Laboratory was reported as a suspect who might have given nuclear secrets to the People's Republic of China government. The article mentioned Richardson several times, although he denied in sworn testimony that he was the source or that he made improper disclosures. After being fired and spending nine months in solitary confinement as an alleged security risk, Lee was later cleared of espionage charges and released with an apology from the judge. Eventually, Lee won a $1.6 million settlement against the federal government and several news outlets, including the Times and The Washington Post, for the accusation. Richardson was also criticized by the United States Senate for his handling of the espionage inquiry, which involved missing computer hard drives containing sensitive data, and for not testifying in front of Congress sooner. Richardson justified his response by saying that he was waiting to uncover more information before speaking to Congress. Republican Senators called for Richardson's resignation, while both parties criticized his role in the incident, and the scandal ended Richardson's hope of being named as Al Gore's running mate for the 2000 presidential election.

Richardson tightened security following the scandal, leading to the creation of the National Nuclear Security Administration (NNSA, not to be confused with the NSA and the NSC). This foreshadowed the creation of the Department of Homeland Security in reaction to the 9/11 attacks. He created the Director for Native American Affairs position in the department in 1998, and in January 2000, oversaw the largest return of federal lands, 84,000 acres (340 km^{2}), to a Native American Tribe (the Northern Ute Tribe of Utah) in more than 100 years. Richardson also directed the overhaul of the department's consultation policy with Native American tribes and established the Tribal Energy Program.

== Post–cabinet career (2001–2003) ==
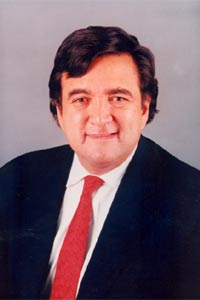
As UN Ambassador

With the end of the Clinton administration in January 2001, Richardson took on a number of different positions. He was an adjunct professor at Harvard Kennedy School and a lecturer at the United World College of the American West (UWC-USA), and also taught at the University of New Mexico, and New Mexico State University. In 2000, Richardson was awarded a United States Institute of Peace Senior Fellowship. He spent the next year researching and writing on the negotiations with North Korea and the energy dimensions of U.S. relations. In 2011, Richardson was named a senior fellow at the Baker Institute of Rice University.

Richardson joined Kissinger McLarty Associates, a "strategic advisory firm" headed by former Secretary of State Henry Kissinger and former Clinton White House chief of staff Mack McLarty, as Senior Managing Director.

From February 2001 to June 2002, he served on the board of directors of Peregrine Systems. He also served on the corporate boards of several energy companies, including Valero Energy Corporation and Diamond Offshore Drilling. He withdrew from these boards after being nominated by the Democratic Party for governor of New Mexico, but retained considerable stock holdings in Valero and Diamond Offshore. He would later sell these stocks during his campaign for president in 2007, saying he was "getting questions" about the propriety of these holdings, especially given his past as energy secretary, and that it had become a distraction.

Richardson was on the board of directors of the National Institute for Civil Discourse (NICD), which was created after the 2011 Tucson shooting of Congresswoman Gabby Giffords.

== Governor of New Mexico (2003–2011) ==
=== First term ===
Richardson was elected governor of New Mexico in November 2002, having defeated the Republican nominee, John Sanchez, 56–39%. During the campaign, he set a Guinness World Record for most handshakes in eight hours by a politician, breaking Theodore Roosevelt's record. He succeeded a two-term Republican governor, Gary Johnson. He took office in January 2003 as the only Hispanic Governor in the United States. In his first year, Richardson proposed "tax cuts to promote growth and investment" and passed a broad personal income tax cut and won a statewide special election to transfer money from the state's Permanent Fund to meet current expenses and projects. In early 2005, Richardson helped make New Mexico the first state in the nation to provide $400,000 in life insurance coverage for New Mexico National Guard members who serve on active duty. Thirty-five states have since followed suit.

Working with the legislature, he formed Richardson's Investment Partnership (GRIP) in 2003. The partnership has been used to fund large-scale public infrastructure projects throughout New Mexico, including the use of highway funds to construct a brand new commuter rail line (the Rail Runner) that runs between Belen, and Santa Fe. He supported a variety of LGBT rights in his career as governor; he added sexual orientation and gender identity to New Mexico's list of civil rights categories. However, he was opposed to same-sex marriage, and he faced criticism for his use of the anti-gay slur maricón on Don Imus's morning radio show in March 2006.

During the summer of 2003, he met with a delegation from North Korea at its request to discuss concerns over that country's nuclear weapons. At the request of the White House, he also flew to North Korea in 2005 and met with another North Korean delegation in 2006. On December 7, 2006, Secretary General of the Organization of American States José Miguel Insulza named Richardson his Special Envoy for Hemispheric Affairs with the mandate to "promote dialogue on issues of importance to the region, such as immigration and free trade".

In 2003, Richardson backed and signed legislation creating a permit system for New Mexicans to carry concealed handguns. He applied for and received a concealed weapons permit, though by his own admission he seldom carries a gun.

As Richardson discussed frequently during his 2008 run for president, he supported a controversial New Mexico law allowing undocumented immigrants to obtain driver's licenses for reasons of public safety. He said that because of the program, traffic fatalities had gone down, and the percentage of uninsured drivers decreased from 33% to 11%.

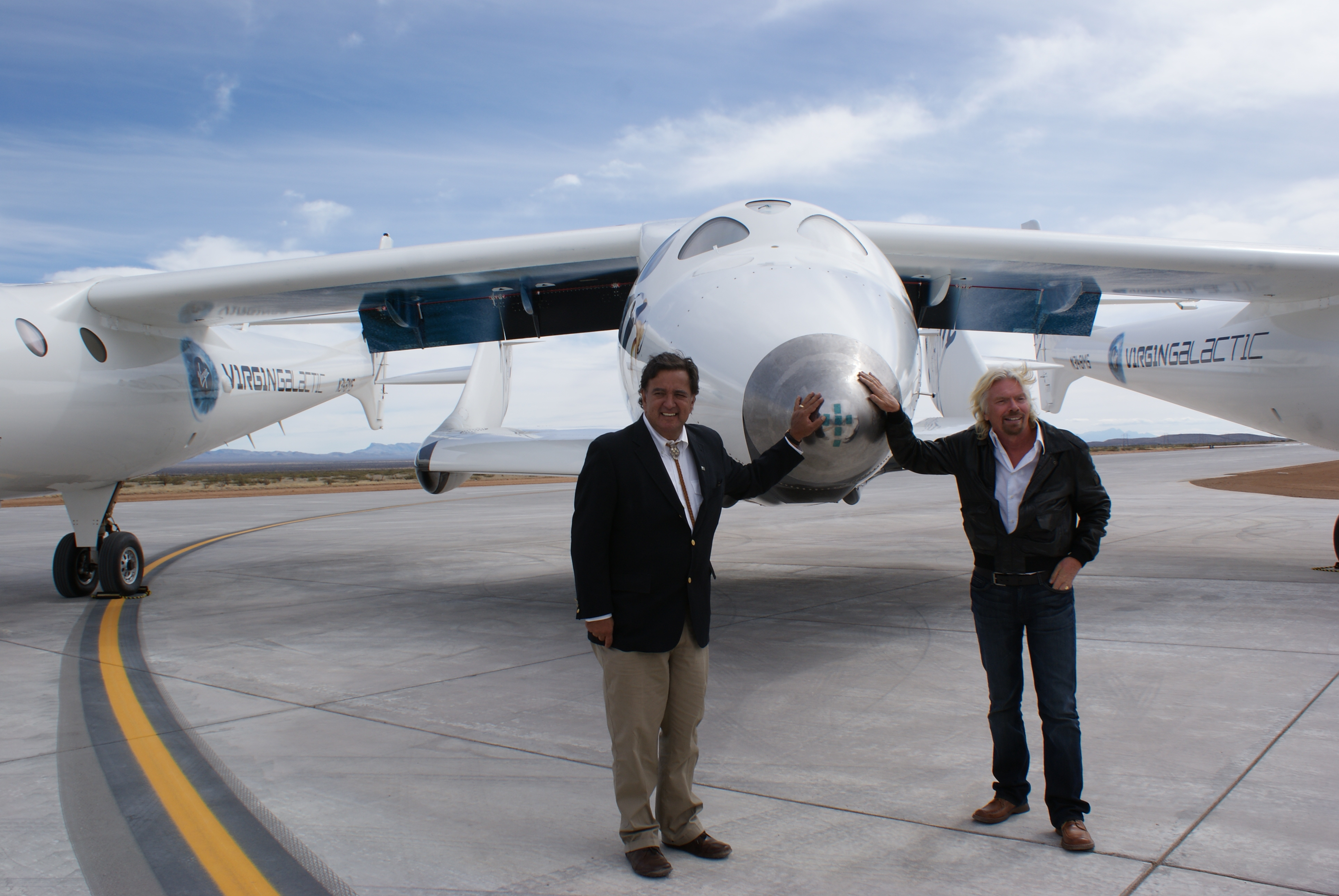
Gov. Richardson and Richard Branson with SpaceShipTwo, 2010

Richardson was named Chair of the Democratic Governors Association in 2004 and announced a desire to increase the role of Democratic governors in deciding the party's future.

In December 2005, Richardson announced the intention of New Mexico to collaborate with billionaire Richard Branson to bring space tourism to the proposed Spaceport America located near Las Cruces. In 2006, Forbes credited Richardson's reforms in naming Albuquerque the best city in the United States for business and careers. The Cato Institute, meanwhile, consistently rated Richardson as one of the most fiscally responsible Democratic governors in the nation.

In March 2006, Richardson vetoed legislation that would ban the use of eminent domain to transfer property to private developers, as allowed by the Supreme Court's 2005 decision in Kelo v. City of New London. He promised to work with the legislature to draft new legislation addressing the issue in the 2007 legislative session.

On September 7, 2006, Richardson flew to Sudan to meet President Omar Al-Bashir and successfully negotiated the release of imprisoned journalist Paul Salopek. The Sudanese had charged Salopek with espionage on August 26, 2006, while on a National Geographic assignment. In January 2007, at the request of the Save Darfur Coalition, he brokered a 60-day cease-fire between al-Bashir and leaders of several rebel factions in the western Sudanese region of Darfur. The cease-fire never became effective, however, with allegations of breaches on all sides.

=== Second term ===
2006 New Mexico gubernatorial election results by county

Richardson won his second term as Governor of New Mexico on November 7, 2006, 68–32% against former New Mexico Republican Party Chairman John Dendahl. Richardson received the highest percentage of votes in any gubernatorial election in the state's history.

In December 2006, Richardson announced that he would support a ban on cockfighting in New Mexico which became law on March 12, 2007. Puerto Rico, U.S. Virgin Islands, Guam, and the Northern Mariana Islands are now the only parts of the United States where cockfighting is legal.

During New Mexico's 2007 legislative session, Richardson signed a bill into law that made New Mexico the 12th state to legalize cannabis for medical reasons. When asked if this would hurt him in a presidential election, he stated that it did not matter, as it was "the right thing to do".

During 2008 and 2009, Richardson faced "possible legal issues" while a federal grand jury investigated pay-to-play allegations in the awarding of a lucrative state contract to a company that gave campaign contributions to Richardson's political action committee, Moving America Forward. The company in question, CDR, was alleged to have funneled more than $100,000 in donations to Richardson's PAC in exchange for state construction projects. Richardson said when he withdrew his Commerce Secretary nomination that he was innocent; his popularity then slipped below 50% in his home state. In August 2009, federal prosecutors dropped the pending investigation against the governor, and there was speculation in the media about Richardson's career after his second term as New Mexico governor concluded.

On March 18, 2009, he signed a bill repealing the death penalty, making New Mexico the second U.S. state, after New Jersey, to repeal the death penalty by legislative means since the 1960s. Richardson was subsequently honored with the 2009 Human Rights Award by Death Penalty Focus.

In December 2010, while still serving as governor, Richardson returned to North Korea in an unofficial capacity at the invitation of the North's chief nuclear negotiator Kim Kye-gwan. Upon arriving in Pyongyang on December 16, Richardson told reporters that his "objective is to see if we can reduce the tension on the Korean peninsula, that is my objective. I am going to have a whole series of talks with North Korean officials here and I look forward to my discussions", he said. On December 19, Richardson said his talks with North Korean officials made "some progress" in trying to resolve what he calls a "very tense" situation. Speaking from Pyongyang, Richardson told U.S. television network CNN that a North Korean general he met was receptive to his proposal for setting up a hotline between North and South Korean forces, and also was open to his idea for a military commission to monitor disputes in and around the Yellow Sea.

After his return from North Korea, Richardson dealt with the issue of a pardon for William H. Bonney, aka Billy the Kid, for killing Sheriff William J. Brady of Lincoln County, New Mexico, some 130 years before. Following up on the promise of a pardon at the time by then-territorial governor Lew Wallace, Richardson said he could not pardon Bonney posthumously because he did not want to second-guess his predecessor's decision. "It was a very close call", Richardson said. "The romanticism appealed to me to issue a pardon, but the facts and the evidence did not support it."

Richardson's second term in office ended in 2011 and he was term-limited from further terms as governor.

== 2008 presidential campaign ==
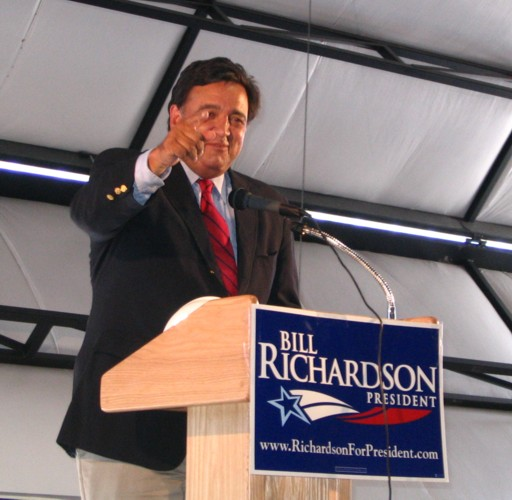
Richardson campaigning in Elko, Nevada; July 2007

Richardson was a candidate for the Democratic nomination for the 2008 presidential election but dropped out on January 10, 2008, after lackluster showings in the first primary and caucus contests. Despite his long history and friendship with the Clinton family, Richardson endorsed Barack Obama for the Democratic nomination on March 21, 2008, over Hillary Clinton. Commentator and Clinton ally James Carville compared Richardson to Judas Iscariot for the move. Richardson responded in a Washington Post article, feeling "compelled to defend [himself] against character assassination and baseless allegations."

Richardson was a rumored vice presidential candidate for Democratic presumptive nominee Barack Obama, and was fully vetted by the Obama campaign, before Obama chose Joe Biden on August 23, 2008.

== Secretary of Commerce nomination ==
Following Barack Obama's victory in the 2008 presidential election, Richardson's name was frequently mentioned as a possible Cabinet appointment in the incoming Obama administration. Most of this speculation surrounded the position of Secretary of State, given Richardson's background as a diplomat. Richardson did not publicly comment on the speculation. Ultimately, Hillary Clinton was Obama's nominee for Secretary of State.

Richardson was also considered for the position of Commerce Secretary. On December 3, 2008, Obama tapped Richardson for the post. On January 4, 2009, Richardson withdrew his name as Commerce Secretary nominee because of the federal grand jury investigation into pay-to-play allegations. The New York Times had reported in late December that the grand jury investigation issue would be raised at Richardson's confirmation hearings. Later, in August 2009, Justice Department officials decided not to seek indictments.

== Controversies ==
=== Monica Lewinsky ===
According to his autobiography, while serving as United States Ambassador to the United Nations, Bill Richardson was asked by the White House in 1997 to interview Monica Lewinsky for a job on his staff. Richardson did so, and later offered her a position, which she declined. The American Spectator alleged that Richardson knew more about the Clinton–Lewinsky scandal than he had declared to the grand jury.

=== Allegations of corruption ===
In its April 2010 report, ethics watchdog group Citizens for Responsibility and Ethics in Washington named Richardson one of the 11 worst governors in the United States because of various ethics issues throughout Richardson's term as governor. The group accused Richardson of allowing political allies to benefit from firms connected to state investments, rewarding close associates with state positions or benefits (including providing a longtime friend and political supporter with a costly state contract), and allowing pay-to-play activity in his administration. They also opined that he fell short on efforts to make state government more transparent. In 2011, Richardson was under investigation for his role in alleged campaign-finance violations. A former member of Richardson's campaign claimed that, during Richardson's 2008 presidential campaign, Richardson and members of his campaign paid an unknown woman $250,000 to keep her from exposing an alleged affair they had in 2004.

During the 2012 trial United States of America v. Carollo, Goldberg and Grimm, the former CDR employee Doug Goldberg testified that he was involved in giving Bill Richardson campaign contributions amounting to $100,000 in exchange for his company, CDR, being hired to handle a $400 million swap deal for the New Mexico state government. During his testimony, Doug Goldberg stated that he had been given an envelope containing a check for $25,000 payable to Moving America Forward, Bill Richardson's political action committee, by his boss, Stewart Wolmark, and told to deliver it to Bill Richardson at a fundraiser. When Goldberg handed the envelope to Richardson, he allegedly told Goldberg to "Tell the big guy [Stewart Wolmark] I'm going to hire you guys". Goldberg went on to testify that CDR was hired, but that he later learned that another firm was hired by Richardson to perform the actual work required and that Stewart Wolmark had given Richardson a further $75,000 in contributions.

=== Jeffrey Epstein ties ===
In 2019, it was revealed that Richardson was among those named in court documents from a civil suit between Virginia Giuffre and Jeffrey Epstein associate Ghislaine Maxwell. The documents were unsealed on August 9, 2019, a day before Epstein's death. Giuffre alleged that she was sexually trafficked by Epstein and Maxwell to several high-profile individuals, including Richardson, while she was underage in the early 2000s. Epstein contributed $50,000 to Richardson's successful campaign for Governor of New Mexico in 2002 and again for his successful run for reelection in 2006. Flight logs for Epstein's helicopter released by the US Congress in 2025 showed that in 2011 Richardson and his chief of staff Brian Condi traveled with Epstein and three of his victims from the British Virgin Islands to the US Virgin Islands. According to Condi the flight originated at Richard Branson's Necker Island (British Virgin Islands).

Court documents from 2015 that were unsealed in 2019 alleged Richardson's possible involvement with the Jeffrey Epstein child-trafficking ring, allegations which he denied. A spokesperson for Richardson also denied the claims, stating that Richardson did not know Giuffre and had never seen Epstein in the presence of young or underage girls. Richardson released a statement in August 2019, saying that he had offered his assistance in the investigation of Epstein to the U.S. Attorney for the Southern District of New York. Richardson's attorney, Jeff Brown of Dechert LLP, later said that he was informed by the assistant U.S. attorney that Richardson was neither a target, subject, nor witness in the case and that there was no allegation against Richardson that the government was actively investigating. Giuffre, who died in April 2025, reiterated her accusations about being directed to have sex with Richardson in her posthumous October 2025 memoir Nobody's Girl: A Memoir of Surviving Abuse and Fighting for Justice. On November 12, 2025, Richardson was confirmed to be among numerous people listed in Epstein's personal contact book.

== Private diplomacy ==
Richardson visited North Korea several times and was involved in negotiations with the leadership there since the early 1990s. In 1996, he accompanied U.S. State Department officials and successfully negotiated the release of Evan Hunziker, the first American civilian to be arrested by North Korea on espionage charges since the end of the Korean War.

In 2011, he was again appointed as special envoy of the Organization of American States. Richardson formed a foundation, the Richardson Center, to help negotiate the release of political prisoners globally.

In January 2013, he led a delegation to North Korea of business leaders, including Google chair Eric Schmidt shortly after the state launched an orbital rocket. Richardson called the trip a "private, humanitarian" mission by U.S. citizens. He tried unsuccessfully to speak to North Korean officials about the detention of Kenneth Bae, a U.S. citizen accused of committing "hostile" acts against the state and sought to visit him but was only able to deliver to authorities a letter from Bae's son. (Bae was released in November 2014.)

In March 2016, at the request of Ohio Governor John Kasich, Richardson unsuccessfully negotiated for the release of Cincinnati college student Otto Warmbier, who had been detained on a visit to North Korea. Warmbier was eventually released in a vegetative state in June 2017 and died in Cincinnati later that same month.

In November 2021, Richardson undertook a mission to Myanmar, where he negotiated with military junta head Min Aung Hlaing and secured the release of U.S. journalist Danny Fenster from an 11-year prison sentence.

Shortly before his death, Richardson was nominated for a Nobel Peace Prize by four Democratic senators for his role in hostage diplomacy seeking the release of 15 political prisoners, including professional basketball player Brittney Griner and former U.S. Marine Trevor Reed.

== Post–gubernatorial career ==
In 2011, Richardson joined the boards of APCO Worldwide company Global Political Strategies as chairman, the World Resources Institute, the National Council for Science and the Environment, and Abengoa (international advisory board).

In 2012, Richardson joined the advisory board of Grow Energy and Refugees International. He was a member of Washington, D.C.–based Western Hemisphere think tank, the Inter-American Dialogue.

In December 2012, Richardson became chairman of the Board of Directors of Car Charging Group, the largest independent owner and operator of public electric vehicle charging stations in the United States. In 2013 Richardson joined the Board of Advisors for the Fuel Freedom Foundation.

== Death ==
Richardson died at his summer house in Chatham, Massachusetts, on September 1, 2023, at age 75.

== Publications ==
- Bill Richardson with Michael Ruby. 2005. Between Worlds: The Making of an American Life – An Autobiography. G. P. Putnam's Sons. ISBN 0399153241.
- Bill Richardson. 2008. Leading by Example: How We Can Inspire an Energy and Security Revolution. Wiley. ISBN 9780470186374
- Bill Richardson, Charles Streeper, and Margarita Sevcik. Fall 2011. Sweeping Up Dirty Bombs: A Shift From Normative to Pro-Active Measures. Federation of American Scientists.
- Bill Richardson, with Gay Dillingham, Charles Streeper, and Arjun Makhijani. January 2011. "Universal Transparency: A Goal for the U.S. at the 2012 Nuclear Security Summit". Arms Control Today. Arms Control Association.
- Bill Richardson with Kevin Bleyer. 2013. How to Sweet-Talk a Shark: Strategies and Stories from a Master Negotiator. Rodale Books. ISBN 9781623360580.

== See also ==
- Electoral history of Bill Richardson
- List of Latino Democrats
- List of Hispanic Americans in the United States Congress
- List of minority governors and lieutenant governors in the United States
- Unsuccessful nominations to the Cabinet of the United States

U.S. House of Representatives
| New constituency | Member of the U.S. House of Representatives from New Mexico's 3rd congressional district 1983–1997 | Succeeded by Bill Redmond |
| Preceded by Robert García | Chair of the Congressional Hispanic Caucus; 1984–1985 | Succeeded by Marty Martínez |
Diplomatic posts
| Preceded by Madeleine Albright | United States Ambassador to the United Nations; 1997–1998 | Succeeded by Peter Burleigh; Acting |
Political offices
| Preceded by Federico Peña | United States Secretary of Energy; 1998–2001 | Succeeded by Spencer Abraham |
| Preceded by Gary Johnson | Governor of New Mexico; 2003–2011 | Succeeded by Susana Martinez |
Awards and achievements
| Preceded by Bob Dole | Recipient of the Theodore Roosevelt Award; 1999 | Succeeded by Roger Staubach |
Party political offices
| Preceded by Martin Chávez | Democratic nominee for Governor of New Mexico; 2002, 2006 | Succeeded by Diane Denish |
| Preceded by Terry McAuliffe | Permanent Chairperson of the Democratic National Convention; 2004 | Succeeded by Nancy Pelosi |
| Preceded by Tom Vilsack | Chair of the Democratic Governors Association; 2004–2006 | Succeeded by Kathleen Sebelius |
