= Jack M. Campbell =

American politician

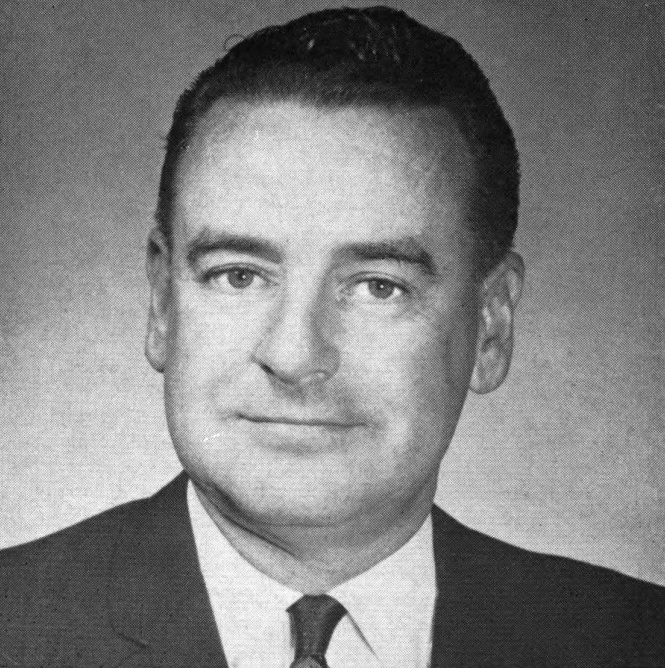

21st Governor of New Mexico
- In office January 1, 1963 – January 1, 1967
- Lieutenant: Mack Easley
- Preceded by: Tom Bolack
- Succeeded by: David Cargo

Member of the New Mexico House of Representatives
- In office 1955–1962

Personal details
- Born: John Moren Campbell; September 10, 1916 Hutchinson, Kansas, U.S.
- Died: June 14, 1999 (aged 82) Santa Fe, New Mexico, U.S.
- Party: Democratic
- Spouse: Ruthanne DeBus
- Children: 4
- Education: Washburn University (BA, LLB)
- Profession: Attorney

Military service
- Allegiance: United States
- Branch/service: United States Marine Corps
- Battles/wars: World War II

John Moren Campbell (September 10, 1916 – June 14, 1999) was an American politician who served as the 21st governor of New Mexico from January 1, 1963 until January 1, 1967.

== Early life and education ==
Campbell was born in Hutchinson, Reno County, Kansas, and educated at Washburn University, where he received an undergraduate degree in 1938 and an LL.B degree in 1940.

== Career ==
During World War II, Campbell served in the United States Marine Corps. After the war, he established a legal practice in Albuquerque, New Mexico, while working as an agent for the Federal Bureau of Investigation.

In 1955, Campbell began his career in politics when he was elected to the New Mexico House of Representatives, where he served until 1962, after having spent the last two years as Speaker.

In 1962, he was the Democratic nominee for governor and defeated incumbent Edwin L. Mechem 130,933 to 116,184. Two years later, in 1964, he became the first New Mexico governor in 12 years to win re-election.

In office, Campbell supported programs to aid the mentally ill, and appointed the first state science adviser. In 1963 he called for an overhaul in the New Mexico Constitution and convinced the legislature to create a Constitutional Revision Commission, which eventually led to the 1969 New Mexico Constitutional Convention.

After leaving office, he served on the Atomic Safety and Licensing Board.

== Death ==
Campbell died in Santa Fe, New Mexico in 1999.

Party political offices
Preceded by John Burroughs	Democratic nominee for Governor of New Mexico; 1962, 1964	Succeeded by Gene Lusk
Political offices
Preceded by Tom Bolack	Governor of New Mexico; 1963–1967	Succeeded by David F. Cargo
