= Edwin L. Mechem =

American judge and politician (1912–2002)

Edwin Mechem
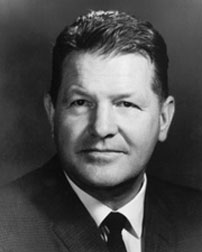

Senior Judge of the United States District Court for the District of New Mexico
- In office July 3, 1982 – November 27, 2002

Judge of the United States District Court for the District of New Mexico
- In office October 14, 1970 – July 3, 1982
- Appointed by: Richard Nixon
- Preceded by: Seat established by 84 Stat. 294
- Succeeded by: Bobby Baldock

United States Senator from New Mexico
- In office November 30, 1962 – November 3, 1964
- Appointed by: Tom Bolack
- Preceded by: Dennis Chávez
- Succeeded by: Joseph Montoya

15th, 17th and 19th Governor of New Mexico
- In office January 1, 1961 – November 30, 1962
- Lieutenant: Tom Bolack
- Preceded by: John Burroughs
- Succeeded by: Tom Bolack
- In office January 1, 1957 – January 1, 1959
- Lieutenant: Joseph Montoya vacant
- Preceded by: John F. Simms
- Succeeded by: John Burroughs
- In office January 1, 1951 – January 1, 1955
- Lieutenant: Tibo J. Chávez
- Preceded by: Thomas J. Mabry
- Succeeded by: John F. Simms

Member of the New Mexico House of Representatives
- In office 1947–1948

Personal details
- Born: Edwin Leard Mechem; July 2, 1912 Alamogordo, New Mexico, U.S.
- Died: November 27, 2002 (aged 90) Albuquerque, New Mexico, U.S.
- Party: Republican
- Education: University of Arkansas (LLB)

Edwin Leard Mechem (July 2, 1912 – November 27, 2002) was an American attorney, politician, and jurist from New Mexico. He served as the 15th, 17th, and 19th governor of New Mexico, the first person born in the 20th century to become the state's governor, as well as the first person born in New Mexico after statehood to ascend to the office. During his final term as governor, Mechem appointed himself as a United States Senator, pursuant to the Seventeenth Amendment to the United States Constitution. During his tenure, he was one of five non-Southern Republicans in the Senate to vote against the Civil Rights Act 1964. He was defeated in his bid to keep his senate seat in the 1964 United States Senate election in New Mexico. He later served as a United States district judge of the United States District Court for the District of New Mexico.

== Early life and education ==
Born in Alamogordo, New Mexico, he attended schools in Alamogordo and Las Cruces. He attended New Mexico A&M University (now New Mexico State University) from 1930 to 1931 and 1935, where he was a member of Alpha Delta Theta fraternity. When it became a chapter of Sigma Pi fraternity Mechem was one of the first alumni to be initiated into the national organization. He worked as a land surveyor for the United States Bureau of Reclamation in Las Cruces from 1932 to 1935. He transferred his college credits to the University of Arkansas School of Law and graduated in 1939 with a Bachelor of Laws.

== Career ==
=== New Mexico politics ===
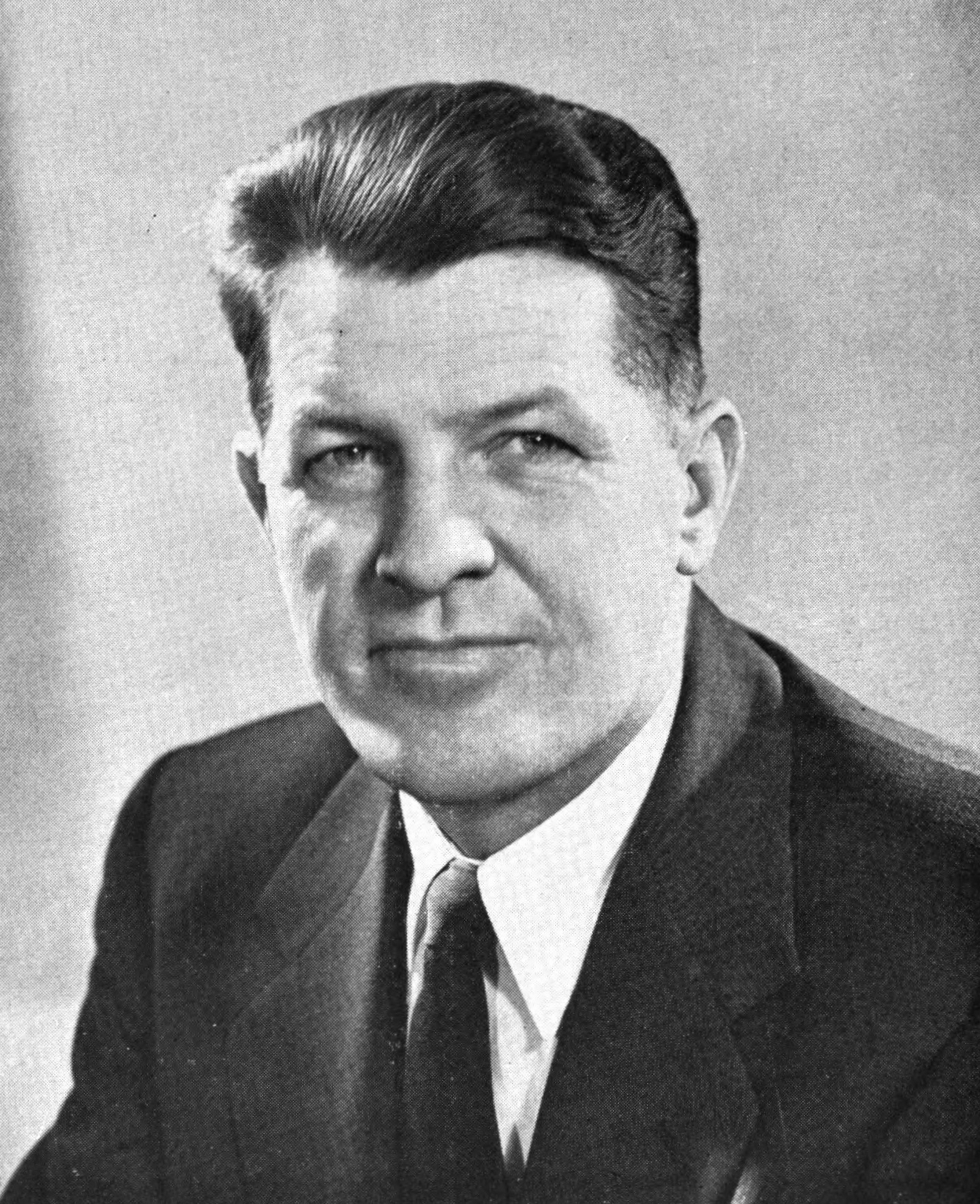
Mechem as governor in 1958.

He was admitted to the New Mexico Bar in 1939 and practiced law in Las Cruces and later Albuquerque, New Mexico. He was an FBI agent from 1942 to 1945 and a member of the New Mexico House of Representatives from 1947 to 1948.

He was elected Governor in 1950 and 1952, did not run in 1954, and was elected again in 1956. In 1954 he ran for the United States Senate but was defeated by sitting Senator Clinton Presba Anderson. After winning another term as governor in 1956, he was defeated for reelection again in 1958, then elected to a fourth term in 1960. A member of the Committee on Government Security from 1956 to 1957, and a member of the American Law Institute, he was again elected Governor in 1960. Mechem lost his bid for reelection on November 6, 1962. He arranged his own appointment (as was his prerogative under the Seventeenth Amendment) to the United States Senate when long-time senator Dionisio "Dennis" Chavez died later that month. In the Senate he voted against the Civil Rights Act of 1964. He served until November 1964 and resumed his law practice after an unsuccessful run for reelection. He was a member of the New Mexico Commission on Reorganization of the Executive Branch and a member of the New Mexico State Police Commission.

=== Federal judicial service ===
Mechem was nominated by President Richard Nixon on September 3, 1970, to the United States District Court for the District of New Mexico, to a new seat authorized by 84 Stat. 294. He was confirmed by the United States Senate on October 8, 1970, and received his commission on October 14, 1970. He assumed senior status on July 3, 1982. His service terminated on November 27, 2002, due to his death.

=== Notable ruling ===
As a judge, Mechem's made a ruling protecting the rights of American Indians on Indian lands from government interference.

== Personal ==
Mechem's father, Edwin Mechem Sr., had been a respected state district judge in Las Cruces. He was the nephew of another New Mexican governor, Merritt C. Mechem. His son, Jesse Mechem, was a 2nd Lieutenant in the Army, when he died in combat during the Vietnam War.

== Death ==
Mechem died on November 27, 2002, at his home in Albuquerque, due to congestive heart failure.

== Sources ==
- United States Congress. "Edwin L. Mechem (id: M000623)". Biographical Directory of the United States Congress.
- Obituary via The Associated Press

Party political offices
Preceded by Manuel Lujan Sr.	Republican nominee for Governor of New Mexico; 1950, 1952	Succeeded by Alvin Stockton
Preceded by Patrick J. Hurley	Republican nominee for U.S. Senator from New Mexico (Class 2); 1954	Succeeded by William Colwes
Preceded by Alvin Stockton	Republican nominee for Governor of New Mexico; 1956, 1958, 1960, 1962	Succeeded by Merle H. Tucker
Preceded by Forrest S. Atchley	Republican nominee for U.S. Senator from New Mexico (Class 1); 1964	Succeeded by Anderson Carter
Political offices
Preceded by Thomas J. Mabry	Governor of New Mexico; 1951–1955	Succeeded by John F. Simms
Preceded by John F. Simms	Governor of New Mexico; 1957–1959	Succeeded by John Burroughs
Preceded by John Burroughs	Governor of New Mexico; 1961–1962	Succeeded by Tom Bolack
U.S. Senate
Preceded by Dennis Chavez	United States Senator (Class 1) from New Mexico; 1962–1964	Succeeded by Joseph Montoya
Legal offices
Preceded by Seat established by 84 Stat. 294	Judge of the United States District Court for the District of New Mexico; 1970–1982	Succeeded by Bobby Baldock
