= John C. Watson (judge) =

American judge (1878–1970)

Justice of the New Mexico Supreme Court
- In office January 1, 1925 – December 31, 1934
- Appointed by: James F. Hinkle
- Preceded by: Clarence M. Botts
- Succeeded by: Charles R. Brice

Personal details
- Born: John Clinton Watson; January 28, 1878 Alma, Michigan
- Died: May 8, 1970 (aged 92)
- Party: Republican
- Children: John T. Watson
- Education: University of Michigan

Military service
- Years of service: 1916 - 1917
- Rank: Captain

John Clinton Watson (January 28, 1878 – May 8, 1970) was a justice of the New Mexico Supreme Court from January 1, 1925 until December 31, 1934, serving as chief justice from 1933 to 1934, before being defeated in his bid for reelection that year. He ran again unsuccessfully in 1936.

== Biography ==
Born near Alma, Michigan, Watson received his undergraduate degree from the University of Michigan in 1898, and then attended the University of Michigan Law School before completing his law degree at the George Washington University Law School. He gained admission to the Michigan state bar in 1906, and later moved to New Mexico, gaining admission to the bar of that state in 1911. He served in the First New Mexican Infantry Regiment, "participating in the military operation against Pancho Villa" from 1916 to 1917, and attaining the rank of captain.

=== Political career ===
In 1923, Governor James F. Hinkle appointed Watson to a four-year term on the State Game Commission.

Watson ran for a seat on the New Mexico Supreme Court in the 1924 election, winning the Republican nomination to a two-year term in September of that year, and winning the general election in November by a larger margin than most candidates vying for office in that election. Watson was reelected in 1926, and became chief justice in 1933. Watson sought reelection again in 1934, but was defeated by Democratic challenger Charles R. Brice.

== Personal life and death ==
Watson's son, John T. Watson, also served on the New Mexico Supreme Court. Watson died after a brief illness at the age of 92.

Political offices
Preceded by Clarence M. Botts	Justice of the New Mexico Supreme Court; 1925–1934	Succeeded by Charles R. Brice
