= 2009 Albuquerque mayoral election =

← 2005	October 6, 2009	2013 →
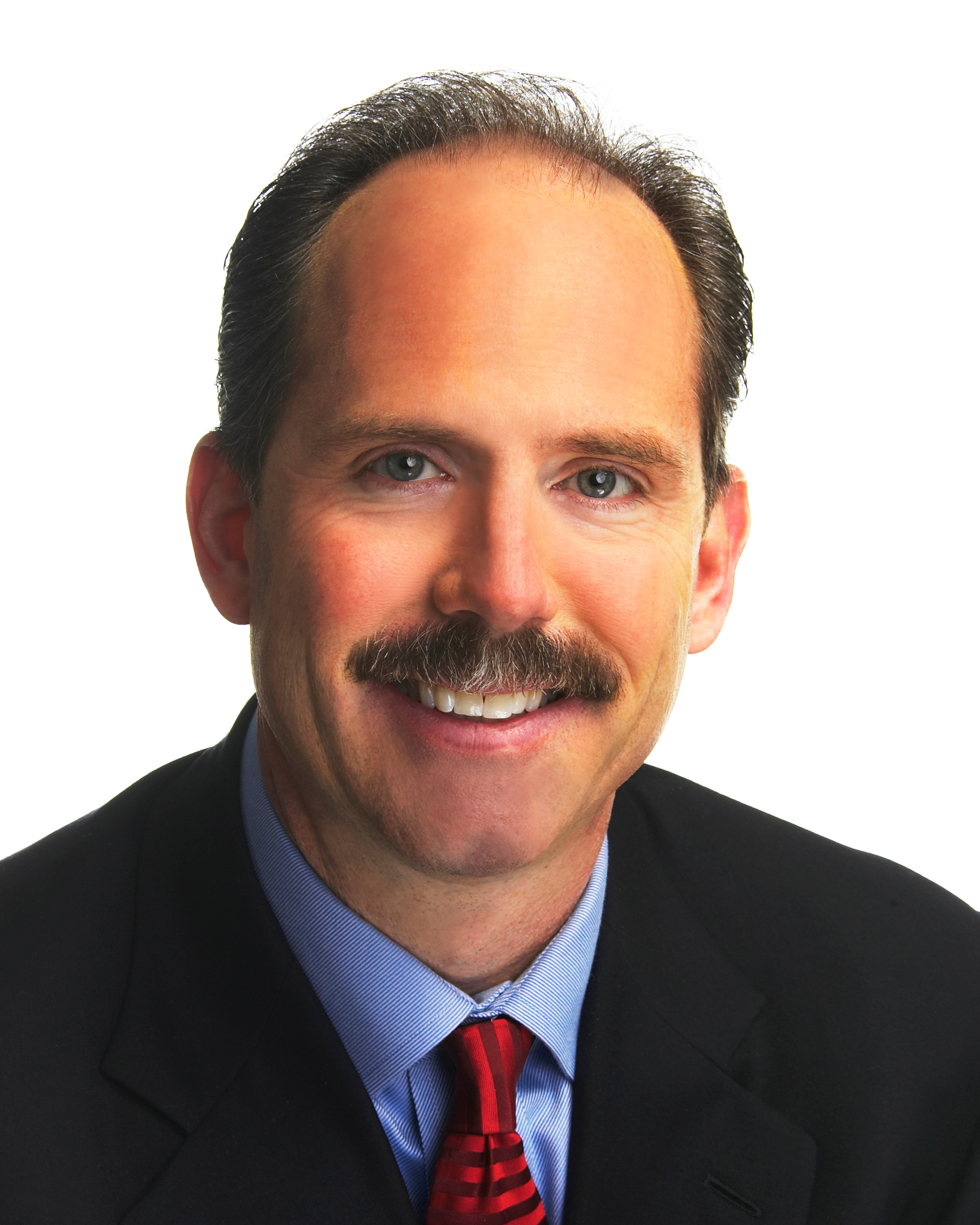

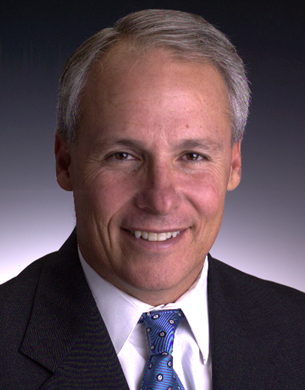

Candidate	Richard Berry	Martin Chávez	Richard Romero
Party	Nonpartisan	Nonpartisan	Nonpartisan
Popular vote	36,869	29,513	17,767
Percentage	43.79%	35.06%	21.10%
Mayor before election
Martin Chávez
Nonpartisan
Elected mayor
Richard Berry
Nonpartisan

The 2009 Albuquerque mayoral election took place on October 6, 2009. Incumbent Mayor Martin Chávez ran for re-election to a third consecutive term, and fourth term overall. The city charter barred Chávez from seeking a third consecutive term, but he challenged the term limits, successfully arguing that the limit was unconstitutional under the state constitution.

In his bid for re-election, Chávez faced two challengers: Republican State Representative Richard Berry and Democrat Richard Romero, a former State Senator. Berry and Romero both attacked Chávez over his challenge to the term limits, with Romero comparing him to New York City Mayor Michael Bloomberg, who was also seeking a third term that year. Berry, a general contractor, campaigned on bringing his perspective as a businessman to city government, while Romero argued for greater transparency, and Chávez emphasized his accomplishments.

Ultimately, though a majority of voters indicated that they believed the city was moving in the right direction, Berry defeated Chávez. Berry won 44 percent of the vote to Chávez's 35 percent and Romero's 21 percent, avoiding the need for a runoff election, and becoming the first Republican to be elected Mayor since 1981.

== General election ==
=== Candidates ===
- Richard Berry, State Representative (Republican)
- Martin Chávez, incumbent Mayor (Democratic)
- Richard Romero, former State Senator (Democratic)

==== Declined ====
- Michael Cadigan, City Councilor
- Rob Dickson, developer
- Debbie O'Malley, City Councilor
- Donna Rowe, community activist
- Rudy Serrano,
- James Thomas, businessman

=== Polling ===
Poll source	Date(s) administered	Sample size (Note: Key: A – all adults RV – registered voters LV – likely voters V – unclear)	Margin of error	Richard Berry	Martin Chávez	Richard Romero	Undecided
Research & Polling Inc.	September 22–24, 2009	406 (LV)	± 5.0%	31%	26%	24%	19%

=== Results ===
2009 Albuquerque mayoral election results
Party	Candidate	Votes	%
Nonpartisan	Richard Berry	36,869	43.79%
Nonpartisan	Martin Chávez (inc.)	29,513	35.06%
Nonpartisan	Richard Romero	17,767	21.10%
Write-in		38	0.05%
Total votes		84,187	100.00%
