= Harry E. Kinney =

American politician

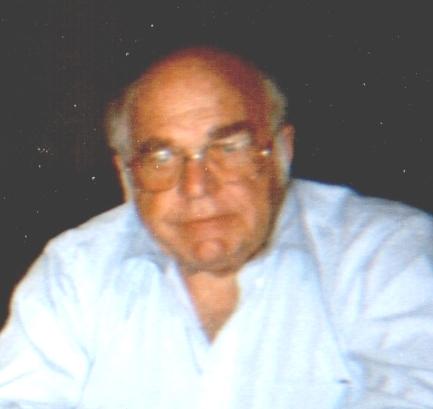
- Harry Kinney in the mid-1990s.

21st & 23rd Mayor of Albuquerque
- In office December 1981 – November 1985
- Preceded by: David Rusk
- Succeeded by: Ken Schultz
- In office July 1, 1974 – November 1977
- Preceded by: Richard G. Vaughan
- Succeeded by: David Rusk

Chairman of the Albuquerque City Commission
- In office October 1971 – February 21, 1973
- Preceded by: Charles E. Barnhart
- Succeeded by: Louis E. Saavedra

Personal details
- Born: June 7, 1924 Trinidad, Colorado
- Died: May 9, 2006 (aged 81) Albuquerque, New Mexico
- Party: Republican
- Spouse: Velma Allene Lowery (1924–1969)

Harry Edwin Kinney (June 7, 1924 – May 9, 2006) was 21st & 23rd Mayor of Albuquerque for two terms, from 1974 to 1977 and again from 1981 to 1985, as well as Chairman of the City Commission from 1971 to 1973. Among his accomplishments as mayor were initiating the Albuquerque International Balloon Fiesta, preserving the Elena Gallegos Land Grant for open space, and establishing the first bike trail and senior center in the city.

Born in Trinidad, Colorado, Kinney attended Raton High School and graduated from the University of New Mexico with a degree in mechanical engineering. He served in the United States Navy and the Navy Reserve and owned an appliance store, before working for Sandia National Laboratories as a staff engineer on weapons development, from 1956 to 1973.

Kinney entered politics when he was elected to the Bernalillo County Commission in 1956, and twice reelected in 1958 and 1960. He was first elected to the Albuquerque City Commission in 1966 and served as chairman from 1971 to 1973. Additionally, he served as an assistant to Senator Pete Domenici before his first term as mayor.

After his retirement from public life, Kinney was a substitute teacher in the Albuquerque public schools, and drove a taxi cab for five years. He died at his Albuquerque home on May 9, 2006. The Harry E. Kinney Civic Plaza in downtown Albuquerque is named in his honor.
