= Frank Clancy =

Frank Clancy may refer to:

- Frank Willey Clancy (1852–1928), politician in New Mexico
- Frank Clancy (sheriff) (1890–1955), murder victim
- T. Frank Clancy (1871–1936), politician in Wisconsin
