= Ken Schultz =

American politician

Mayor of Albuquerque
- In office December 1985 – November 1989
- Preceded by: Harry E. Kinney
- Succeeded by: Louis E. Saavedra

Personal details
- Born: October 10, 1937 Chicago, Illinois, U.S.
- Died: 2019 (aged 81–82) Henderson, Nevada
- Party: Democratic

Kenneth A. Schultz (October 27, 1937 – 2019) was an American politician. He served as mayor of Albuquerque, New Mexico from 1985 to 1989. He also served on the Albuquerque City Council from 1981 to 1985.

Schultz was elected Mayor of Albuquerque in 1985, winning the election over New Mexico Commissioner of Public Lands Jim Baca. Schultz and Baca were the two top finishers in the October election and faced each other in a November runoff. Schultz served one four-year term as mayor as he unsuccessfully ran for re-election in 1989. Louis Saavedra succeeded Schultz as mayor.

In 2009 as a private citizen, Schultz pleaded guilty to one count of mail fraud and conspiracy in connection to a scandal involving the construction of the Metropolitan Courthouse. He was sentenced to five year probation and ordered to pay $50,000 in restitution. Soon afterwards, Mayor Martin Chávez removed his photo portrait from City Hall.

Schultz died in 2019 in Henderson, Nevada, but his death was not reported until 2023.
