= 2013 Albuquerque mayoral election =

← 2009	October 6, 2013	2017 →
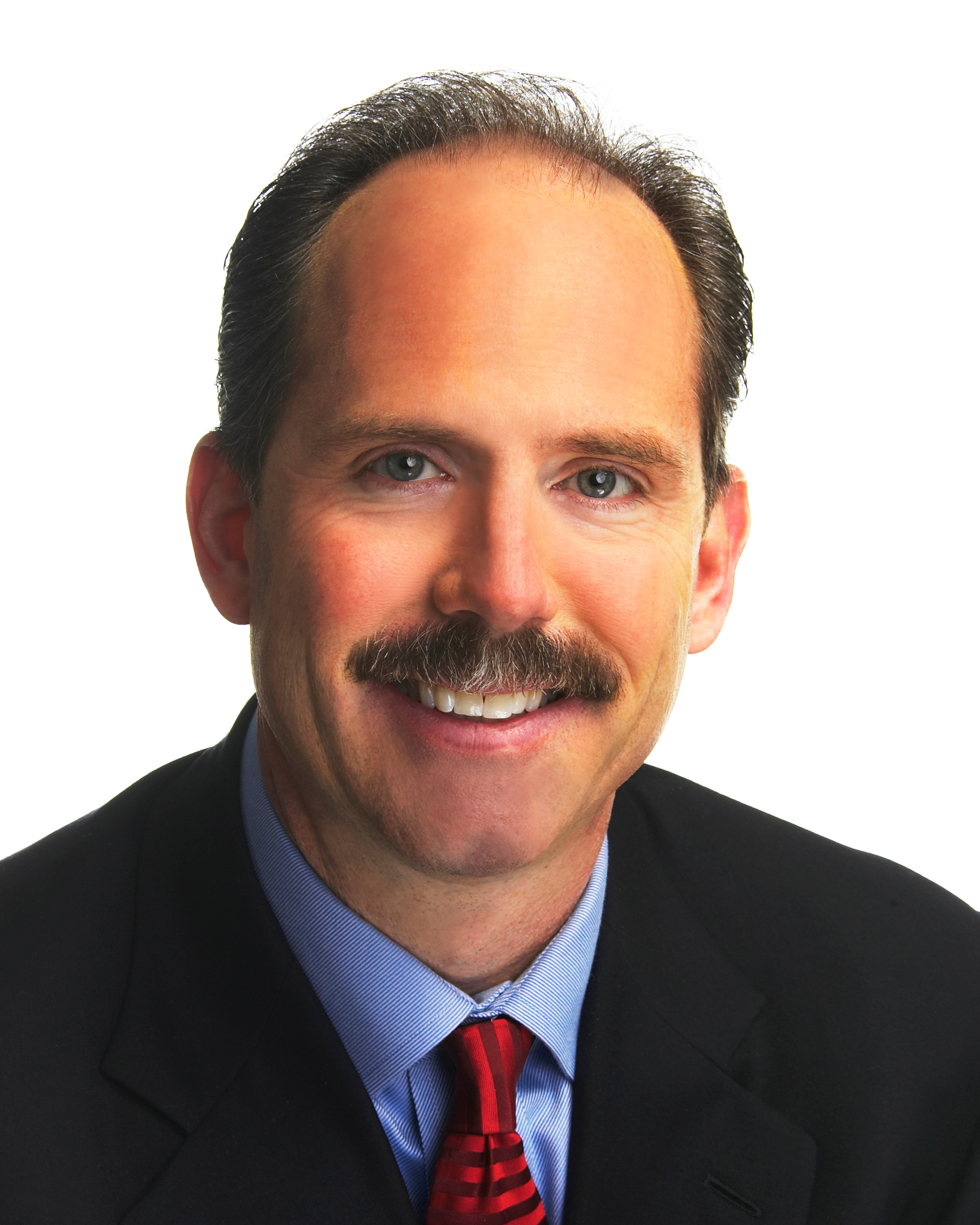

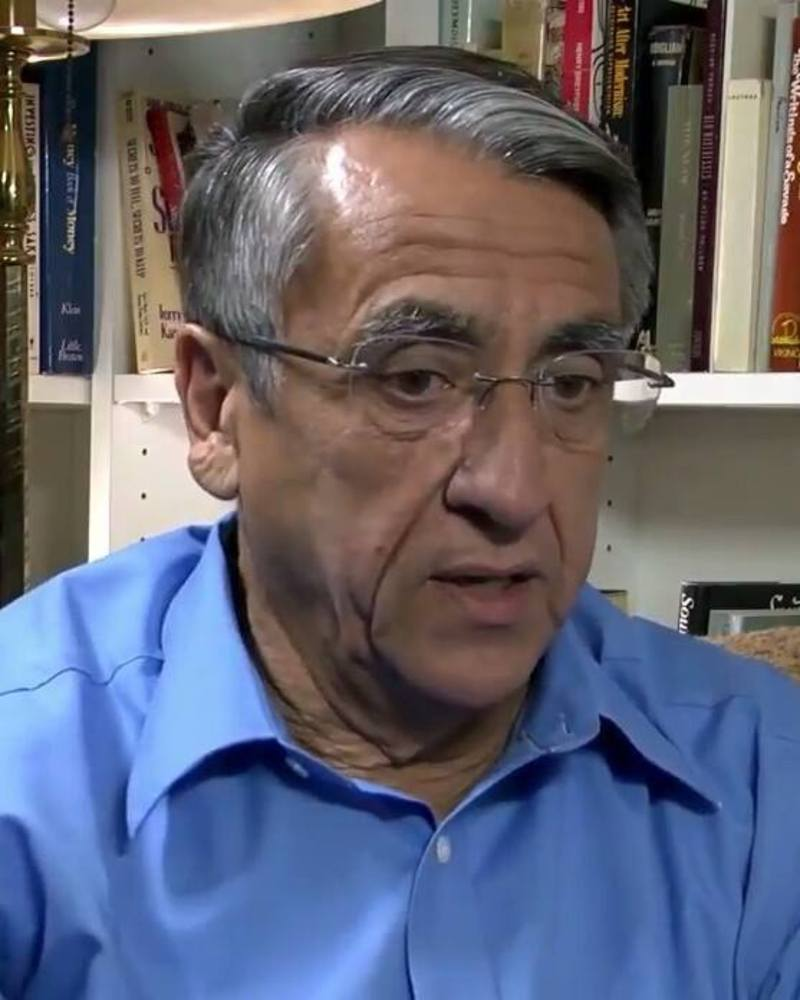
Candidate	Richard Berry	Pete Dinelli
Party	Nonpartisan	Nonpartisan
Popular vote	48,009	20,248
Percentage	68.10%	28.72%
Mayor before election
Richard Berry
Nonpartisan
Elected mayor
Richard Berry
Nonpartisan

The 2013 Albuquerque mayoral election took place on October 4, 2013. This election was the first one to require a runoff election if no candidate received fifty percent of the vote. In past elections, a runoff was required if no candidate received forty percent of the vote, but in a March 11, 2013, special election, voters approved an amendment to the city charter raising the threshold.

Incumbent Mayor Richard Berry, a Republican, ran for re-election to a second term. Though several high-profile candidates, including former Lieutenant Governor Diane Denish, City Councilor Ken Sanchez, and former First Lady of Albuquerque Margaret Aragón de Chávez considered running, all ultimately declined to. Berry's main opponent was former City Councilman Pete Dinelli, a Democrat who had served as the city's Chief Public Safety Officer. Berry ultimately won re-election in a landslide, receiving 68 percent of the vote to Dinelli's 29 percent.

== General election ==
=== Candidates ===
- Richard Berry, incumbent Mayor (Republican)
- Pete Dinelli, former Chief Public Safety Officer, former City Councilman, 1989 candidate for Mayor (Democratic)
- Paul Heh, retired Albuquerque Police Department sergeant (Republican)

==== Withdrawn ====
- Margaret Aragón de Chávez, educator, former First Lady of Albuquerque

==== Declined ====
- Terry Brunner, USDA Rural Development New Mexico State Director
- Diane Denish, former Lieutenant Governor of New Mexico, 2010 Democratic nominee for Governor
- Ken Sanchez, City Councilor

=== Polling ===
Poll source	Date(s) administered	Sample size (Note: Key: A – all adults RV – registered voters LV – likely voters V – unclear)	Margin of error	Richard Berry	Pete Dinelli	Paul Heh	Undecided
SurveyUSA	May 14–17, 2013	501 (LV)	± 4.4%	59%	17%	9%	15%

=== Results ===
2013 Albuquerque mayoral election results
Party	Candidate	Votes	%
Nonpartisan	Richard Berry (inc.)	48,009	68.10%
Nonpartisan	Pete Dinelli	20,248	28.72%
Nonpartisan	Paul Heh	2,217	3.14%
Write-in		26	0.04%
Total votes		70,500	100.00%
