= 2022 New Mexico Attorney General election =

- November 8, 2022
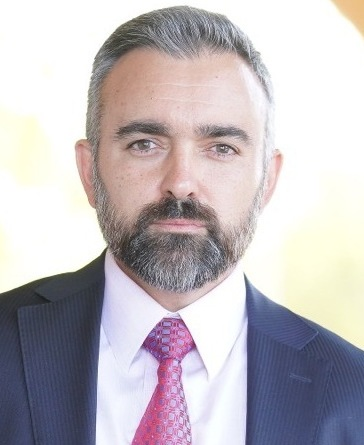

Nominee	Raúl Torrez	Jeremy Gay
Party	Democratic	Republican
Popular vote	388,592	314,023
Percentage	55.31%	44.69%
- Torrez: 50–60% 60–70% 70–80% 80–90% >90% Gay: 50–60% 60–70% 70–80% 80–90% >90% Tie: 50% No votes
Attorney General before election
Hector Balderas
Democratic
Elected Attorney General
Raúl Torrez
Democratic

The 2022 New Mexico Attorney General election took place on November 8, 2022, to elect the next attorney general of New Mexico. Incumbent Democratic Attorney General Hector Balderas was term-limited and could not seek re-election.

== Democratic primary ==
=== Candidates ===
==== Nominee ====
- Raúl Torrez, Bernalillo County district attorney

==== Eliminated in primary ====
- Brian Colón, New Mexico State Auditor

=== Endorsements ===
Brian Colón

Organizations

- Latino Victory Fund
Raúl Torrez

U.S. Senators

- Martin Heinrich, U.S. Senator from New Mexico

Newspapers

- Albuquerque Journal

=== Debates ===
2022 New Mexico Attorney General Democratic primary debates
No.	Date	Host	Moderator	Link	Democratic	Democratic
Key: P Participant A Absent N Not invited I Invited W Withdrawn						
Key: P Participant A Absent N Not invited I Invited W Withdrawn					Brian Colón	Raúl Torrez
1	May 9, 2022	KRQE	Jessica Garate	YouTube	P	P
2	May 25, 2022	KOAT-TV; Albuquerque Journal; KKOB-FM	Dan Boyd; Bob Clark; Royale Da	YouTube	P	P

=== Polling ===
Poll source	Date(s) administered	Sample size (Note: Key: A – all adults RV – registered voters LV – likely voters V – unclear)	Margin of error	Brian Colón	Raúl Torrez	Undecided
SurveyUSA	April 29 – May 7, 2022	583 (LV)	± 5.7%	28%	34%	38%

=== Results ===
Results by county Torrez: 50–60%; 60–70%; Colón: 50–60%; 60–70%

Democratic primary results
Party	Candidate	Votes	%
Democratic	Raúl Torrez	73,299	53.49%
Democratic	Brian Colón	63,723	46.51%
Total votes		137,022	100.0%

== Republican primary ==
=== Candidates ===
==== Declared ====
- Jeremy Gay, U.S. Marine veteran

=== Results ===
Republican primary results
Party	Candidate	Votes	%
Republican	Jeremy Gay	92,688	100.0%
Total votes		92,688	100.0%

== General election ==
=== Predictions ===
Source	Ranking	As of
Sabato's Crystal Ball	Leans D	November 3, 2022
Elections Daily	Likely D	November 1, 2022

=== Polling ===
Poll source	Date(s) administered	Sample size	Margin of error	Raúl Torrez (D)	Jeremy Gay (R)	Other	Undecided
Research & Polling Inc.	October 20–27, 2022	625 (LV)	± 3.9%	49%	39%	2% (Note: "None of these/Wouldn't say" with 2%)	10%
SurveyUSA	October 21–26, 2022	650 (LV)	± 4.9%	47%	37%	–	17%
SurveyUSA	October 1–6, 2022	570 (LV)	± 5.8%	50%	33%	–	16%
Cygnal (R) (Note: Poll sponsored by Gay's campaign.)	September 27–29, 2022	400 (LV)	± 4.9%	42%	41%	–	17%
SurveyUSA	September 8–12, 2022	558 (LV)	± 5.7%	49%	34%	–	18%
Research & Polling Inc.	August 19–25, 2022	518 (LV)	± 4.3%	49%	33%	3% (Note: "None of these/Wouldn't say" with 3%)	15%
Public Policy Polling (D)	June 13–14, 2022	642 (V)	± 3.9%	44%	37%	–	19%

=== Results ===
2022 New Mexico Attorney General election
Party	Candidate	Votes	%	±%
Democratic	Raúl Torrez	388,592	55.31%	−6.50%
Republican	Jeremy Gay	314,023	44.69%	+11.26%
Total votes		702,615	100.0%	
Democratic hold				

==== By county ====
County	Raúl Torrez Democratic		Jeremy Gay Republican		Margin		Total votes cast
County	#	%	#	%	#	%	Total votes cast
Bernalillo	147,612	61.12%	93,895	38.88%	53,717	22.24%	241,507
Catron	517	26.05%	1,468	73.95%	-951	-47.91%	1,985
Chaves	4,697	29.00%	11,498	71.00%	-6,801	-41.99%	16,195
Cibola	3,870	57.36%	2,877	42.64%	993	14.72%	6,747
Colfax	2,238	46.15%	2,611	53.85%	-373	-7.69%	4,849
Curry	2,680	26.45%	7,454	73.55%	-4,774	-47.11%	10,134
De Baca	214	29.32%	516	70.68%	-302	-41.37%	730
Doña Ana	32,419	56.72%	24,737	43.28%	7,682	13.44%	57,156
Eddy	4,085	24.68%	12,465	75.32%	-8,380	-50.63%	16,550
Grant	6,541	56.59%	5,018	43.41%	1,523	13.18%	11,559
Guadalupe	1,059	62.70%	630	37.30%	429	25.40%	1,689
Harding	150	37.31%	252	62.69%	-102	-25.37%	402
Hidalgo	691	44.78%	852	55.22%	-161	-10.43%	1,543
Lea	2,484	17.89%	11,398	82.11%	-8,914	-64.21%	13,882
Lincoln	2,559	30.93%	5,714	69.07%	-3,155	-38.14%	8,273
Los Alamos	6,258	62.52%	3,752	37.48%	2,506	25.03%	10,010
Luna	2,728	47.12%	3,062	52.88%	-334	-5.77%	5,790
McKinley	12,497	66.09%	6,413	33.91%	6,084	32.17%	18,910
Mora	1,657	70.72%	686	29.28%	971	41.44%	2,343
Otero	6,251	35.83%	11,193	64.17%	-4,942	-28.33%	17,444
Quay	913	30.54%	2,077	69.46%	-1,164	-38.93%	2,990
Rio Arriba	9,050	71.19%	3,663	28.81%	5,387	42.37%	12,713
Roosevelt	1,195	25.87%	3,424	74.13%	-2,229	-48.26%	4,619
San Juan	14,090	35.71%	25,363	64.29%	-11,273	-28.57%	39,453
San Miguel	6,903	73.84%	2,445	26.16%	4,458	47.69%	9,348
Sandoval	32,422	53.50%	28,184	46.50%	4,238	6.99%	60,606
Santa Fe	53,247	77.22%	15,709	22.78%	37,538	54.44%	68,956
Sierra	1,983	40.81%	2,876	59.19%	-893	-18.38%	4,859
Socorro	3,267	54.46%	2,732	45.54%	535	8.92%	5,999
Taos	10,608	80.19%	2,621	19.81%	7,987	60.37%	13,229
Torrance	1,887	34.43%	3,594	65.57%	-1,707	-31.14%	5,481
Union	363	25.05%	1,086	74.95%	-723	-49.90%	1,449
Valencia	11,457	45.44%	13,758	54.56%	-2,301	-9.13%	25,215
Totals	388,592	55.31%	314,023	44.69%	74,569	10.61%	702,615

Counties that flipped from Democratic to Republican

- Colfax (largest municipality: Raton)
- Harding (largest city: Roy)
- Hidalgo (largest municipality: Lordsburg)
- Luna (largest municipality: Deming)
- Sierra (largest city: Truth or Consequences)
- Torrance (largest city: Moriarty)
- Valencia (largest municipality: Los Lunas)

==== By congressional district ====
Torrez won all three congressional districts.

District	Torrez	Gay	Representative
1st	56%	44%	Melanie Stansbury
2nd	52%	48%	Yvette Herrell (117th Congress)
2nd	52%	48%	Gabe Vasquez (118th Congress)
3rd	57%	43%	Teresa Leger Fernandez

== Notes ==
Partisan clients
