= Charles A. Leland =

American politician and judge (1859–1901)

Charles Asbury Leland (November 23, 1859 – February 18, 1901) was an American lawyer and politician who served as a justice of the New Mexico Territorial Supreme Court from 1898 to 1900.

== Biography ==
Born in Noble County, Ohio, Leland was raised on a farm, was educated in the public schools, including the high school, and read law while teaching school to gain admission to the bar in 1881. He entered the practice of law in Caldwell, Ohio, eventually partnering with J. M. McGinnis, who had been a member of the firm with which he studied law.

Leland was elected to a three-year term as prosecuting attorney for the county in 1887, and re-elected in 1890. In 1895 he was elected as a Republican to represent Noble County in the seventy-second legislative assembly of Ohio, and strongly supported Joseph B. Foraker for the senate. Leland was re-elected in 1897, to the seventy-third legislative assembly, and made the nominating speech and led the fight in the house for Mark Hanna for the senate. A bout with pneumonia left him with weak lungs, and required help to take him to Thomasville, Georgia, where he regained sixteen pounds in six weeks.

On May 20, 1898, President William McKinley nominated Leland to serve as an associate justice for the fifth district of the territorial supreme court of New Mexico, for which Leland was endorsed by Senators Foraker and Hanna. Leland hoped that the climate of New Mexico would prove beneficial to his precarious health, saying that if it did, he would "make it his permanent home". Leland was popular in New Mexico, and "his prospects of being one of the first Senators when New Mexico received Statehood, were very bright as he was a favorite of both parties".

However, Leland and his family only remained in New Mexico for two years and three months, until his failing health caused them to return to Ohio in September 1900.

== Personal life and death ==
Leland married Cora McKee on December 21, 1889, with whom he had one daughter.

Leland died from consumption (tuberculosis) at his home in Caldwell, Ohio, at the age of 41.

Political offices
Preceded by Humphrey B. Hamilton	Justice of the New Mexico Territorial Supreme Court; 1898–1900	Succeeded by Daniel H. McMillan
