= A. L. Zinn =

American judge (c. 1888–1957)

Justice of the New Mexico Supreme Court
- In office January 1, 1933 – May 31, 1943
- Preceded by: Frank W. Parker; Tom W. Neal
- Succeeded by: Tom W. Neal; Martin A. Threet

Personal details
- Born: Abraham Lucine Zinn; December 24, 1893
- Died: May 15, 1957 (aged 63) Santa Fe, New Mexico, U.S.
- Party: Democratic
- Children: Frank B. Zinn
- Education: University of Denver (LLB)

Military service
- Branch/service: United States Air Force
- Battles/wars: World War I World War II

Abraham Lucine Zinn (December 24, 1893 – May 15, 1957) was an American attorney and jurist who served as a justice of the New Mexico Supreme Court from January 1, 1933 to May 31, 1943. He was Chief Justice from January 1, 1943 until his retirement on June 1, 1943.

== Education ==
He received his law degree from the University of Denver College of Law in 1924, and was admitted to the New Mexico Bar shortly afterwards.

== Career ==
Zinn moved to New Mexico after World War I and served in the New Mexico Senate, where he was Democratic floor leader in 1923. After graduating from law school, he entered the practice of law in Gallup, New Mexico, where he moved "at the invitation of Arthur T. Hannett to pick up the threads of the latter's law practice". He also served as the city attorney of Gallup twice.

In September 1932, Zinn successfully sought the Democratic Party nomination for a seat on the state supreme court. Prior to the election, however, Justice Frank W. Parker died, and Zinn was appointed to the fill that unexpired term, "thereby becoming at the age of 38 the youngest man ever to serve on that bench". Zinn was then elected to the same seat in November of that year. Caught in a scandal in 1935 due to the determination that some years earlier he had commingled state funds with his own, he nonetheless ran for reelection and won in 1936. He was reelected again in 1942, and refused to resign from the bench in 1943, when he enlisted in the United States Air Force, serving in India and China in World War II. When the state auditor withheld his pay due to his absence, and the state legislature drew up a bill to replace Zinn, he finally resigned in May 1943, continuing thereafter to serve in the military until 1945. Zinn again sought the Democratic nomination for a seat on the court in 1950, but was defeated.

== Personal life ==
Zinn was married to Mabel Surguy. They had two sons, Frank B. Zinn and Dean Zinn, both of whom became attorneys. He died at St. Vincent Hospital in Santa Fe, New Mexico, from a heart attack. He is buried in the Santa Fe National Cemetery.
