= 1998 New Mexico gubernatorial election =

- November 3, 1998
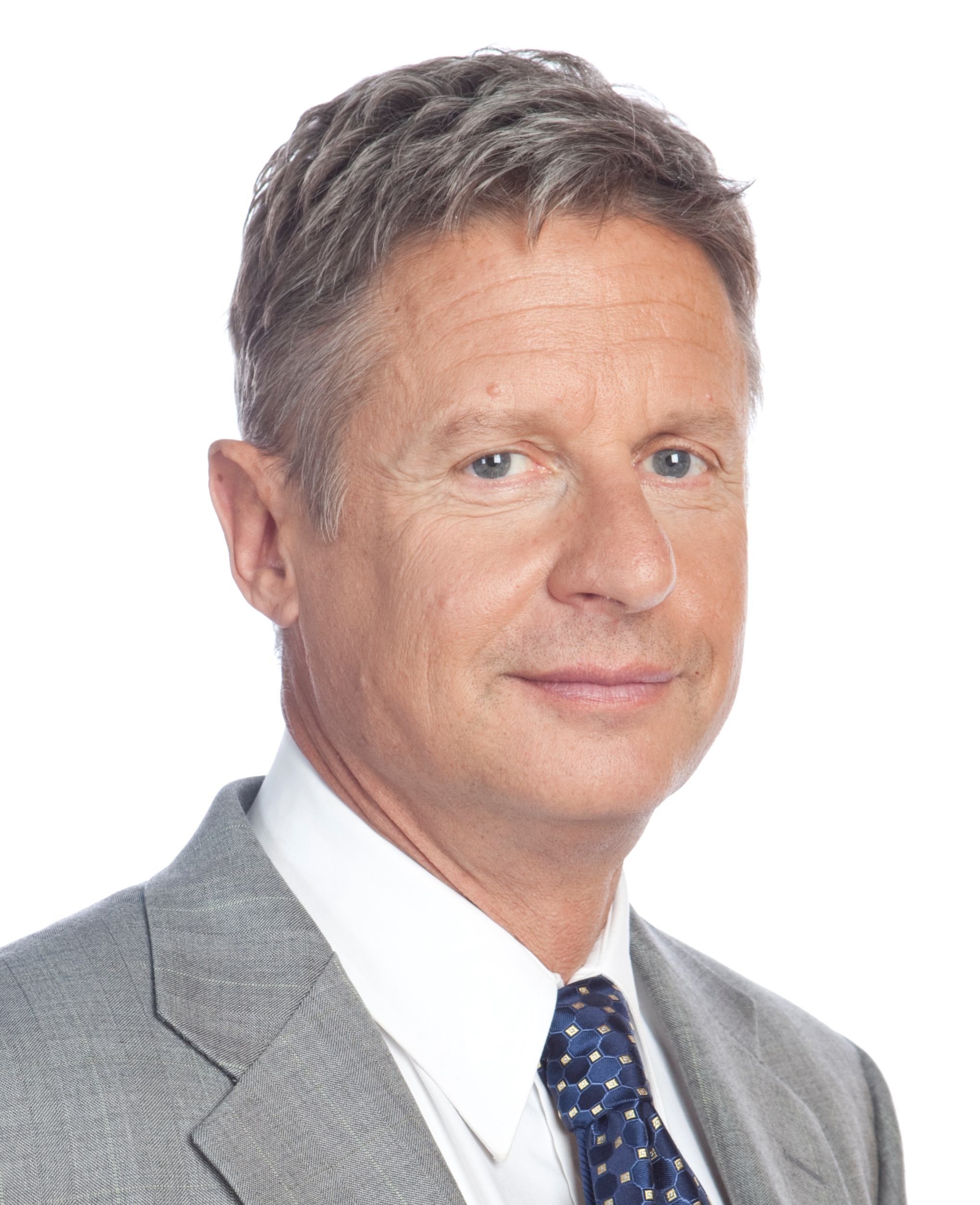

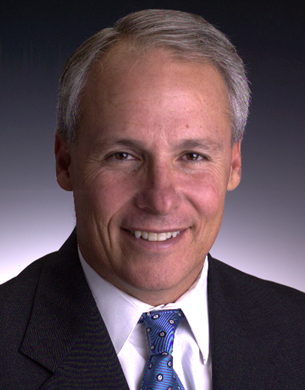
Nominee	Gary Johnson	Martin Chávez
Party	Republican	Democratic
Running mate	Walter Bradley	Diane Denish
Popular vote	271,948	226,755
Percentage	54.53%	45.47%
- County results Johnson: 50–60% 60–70% 70–80% Chávez: 50–60% 60–70% 70–80%
Governor before election
Gary Johnson
Republican
Elected Governor
Gary Johnson
Republican

The 1998 New Mexico gubernatorial election held on November 3, 1998 to elect the governor and lieutenant governor of New Mexico. Republican incumbent Gary Johnson was re-elected to a second term in office over Albuquerque mayor Martin Chávez.

As of 2026, this is the last time a non-Hispanic was elected governor of New Mexico.

== Republican Party ==
=== Candidates ===
- Gary Johnson, incumbent governor of New Mexico since 1995

=== Results ===
Republican primary results
Party	Candidate	Votes	%
Republican	Gary Johnson (incumbent)	64,669	100.00%
Total votes		64,669	100.00%

== Democratic Party ==
=== Candidates ===
- Jerry Apodaca, former governor of New Mexico (1975–79)
- Ben Chavez, 1994 candidate for state representative
- Martin Chávez, mayor of Albuquerque
- Reese P. Fullerton, attorney
- Gary King, state representative from Stanley and son of Bruce King
- Robert E. Vigil, New Mexico state auditor

=== Results ===
Democratic primary results
Party	Candidate	Votes	%
Democratic	Martin J. Chávez	82,147	48.11%
Democratic	Gary K. King	51,847	30.37%
Democratic	Jerry Apodaca	16,303	9.55%
Democratic	Robert E. Vigil	10,483	6.14%
Democratic	Reese P. Fullerton	5,800	3.40%
Democratic	Ben Chavez	4,127	2.42%
Democratic	Frances Salas (write-in)	29	0.02%
Total votes		170,736	100.00%

== General election ==
=== Candidates ===
- Martin Chávez, mayor of Albuquerque (Democratic)
  - Running mate: Diane Denish, businesswoman
- Gary Johnson, incumbent governor since 1995 (Republican)
  - Running mate: Walter Dwight Bradley, incumbent lieutenant governor since 1995

=== Campaign ===
Johnson campaigned on the policies of his first term in office, promising to continue improvements to public education; cutting state spending, taxes, and bureaucracy; and frequent use of his veto and line-item veto power. Chávez, a strong Hispanic candidate in a state with a 40 percent Hispanic population, was initially considered the favorite in the race.

=== Polling ===
Poll source	Date(s)	Sample size (Note: Key: A – all adults RV – registered voters LV – likely voters V – unclear)	Margin of error	Gary Johnson (R)	Martin Chávez (D)	Other / undecided (Note: Calculated by taking the difference of 100% and all other candidates combined.)
Research & Polling, Inc. (Note: Poll sponsored by Albuquerque Journal)	October 27–29, 1998	916 (RV)	± 3.0%	49%	39%	12%
Mason-Dixon Polling & Strategy	October 20, 1998	409	—	47%	43%	10%
Research & Polling Inc.	October 18, 1998	916	—	49%	39%	12%
Mason-Dixon Polling & Strategy	October 6–7, 1998	412 (LV)	± 5.0%	45%	43%	12%
Mason-Dixon Polling & Strategy	September 15–16, 1998	409 (LV)	± 5.0%	42%	44%	14%
Research & Polling, Inc.	September 5–10, 1998	909 (RV)	± 3.0%	42%	40%	18%

=== Results ===
Johnson won with 55 percent of the vote. This made him the first governor of New Mexico elected to two consecutive four-year terms, following the expansion of term limits in 1991. Johnson made the school voucher system a "hallmark issue" of his second term.

1998 New Mexico gubernatorial election (Note: The New Mexico Secretary of State has not published the complete statewide general election canvass on its 1998 election page. The county results can be obtained from the individual county pages and the statewide total from an archived version of the Secretary of State's website)
Party	Candidate	Votes	%	±%
Republican	Gary Johnson (incumbent)	271,948	54.53%	+4.72%
Democratic	Martin Chávez	226,755	45.47%	+5.55%
Majority		45,193	9.06%	
Total votes		498,703	100.00%	
Republican hold		Swing	-0.83%	

==== Results by county ====
County	Gary Johnson Republican		Martin Chávez Democratic		Margin		Total votes cast
County	#	%	#	%	#	%	Total votes cast
Bernalillo	96,329	57.55%	71,067	42.45%	25,262	15.09%	167,396
Catron	1,063	66.73%	530	33.27%	533	33.46%	1,593
Chaves	10,409	63.55%	5,969	36.45%	4,440	27.11%	16,378
Cibola	2,952	43.69%	3,805	56.31%	-853	-12.62%	6,757
Colfax	2,541	54.36%	2,133	45.64%	408	8.73%	4,674
Curry	7,248	71.49%	2,890	28.51%	4,358	42.99%	10,138
De Baca	714	65.63%	374	34.38%	340	31.25%	1,088
Doña Ana	16,635	49.67%	16,858	50.33%	-223	-0.67%	33,493
Eddy	8,927	60.47%	5,835	39.53%	3,092	20.95%	14,762
Grant	4,689	47.14%	5,259	52.86%	-570	-5.73%	9,948
Guadalupe	756	33.80%	1,481	66.20%	-725	-32.41%	2,237
Harding	389	57.89%	283	42.11%	106	15.77%	672
Hidalgo	1,117	53.55%	969	46.45%	148	7.09%	2,086
Lea	9,066	74.12%	3,166	25.88%	5,900	48.23%	12,232
Lincoln	3,613	63.70%	2,059	36.30%	1,554	27.40%	5,672
Los Alamos	5,729	64.02%	3,220	35.98%	2,509	28.04%	8,949
Luna	3,375	57.03%	2,543	42.97%	832	14.06%	5,918
McKinley	5,788	41.72%	8,085	58.28%	-2,297	-16.56%	13,873
Mora	697	27.86%	1,805	72.14%	-1,108	-44.28%	2,502
Otero	8,721	66.38%	4,417	33.62%	4,304	32.76%	13,138
Quay	2,265	60.22%	1,496	39.78%	769	20.45%	3,761
Rio Arriba	3,206	30.26%	7,389	69.74%	-4,183	-39.48%	10,595
Roosevelt	3,387	69.12%	1,513	30.88%	1,874	38.24%	4,900
San Juan	20,233	70.53%	8,454	29.47%	11,779	41.06%	28,687
San Miguel	2,015	22.91%	6,781	77.09%	-4,766	-54.18%	8,796
Sandoval	14,595	59.94%	9,756	40.06%	4,839	19.87%	24,351
Santa Fe	13,821	33.81%	27,053	66.19%	-13,232	-32.37%	40,874
Sierra	2,624	63.54%	1,506	36.46%	1,118	27.07%	4,130
Socorro	2,920	45.21%	3,539	54.79%	-619	-9.58%	6,459
Taos	2,713	31.12%	6,005	68.88%	-3,292	-37.76%	8,718
Torrance	2,623	61.16%	1,666	38.84%	957	22.31%	4,289
Union	1,077	64.76%	586	35.24%	491	29.52%	1,663
Valencia	9,711	54.03%	8,263	45.97%	1,448	8.06%	17,974
Total	271,948	54.53%	226,755	45.47%	45,193	9.06%	498,703

==== Counties that flipped from Democratic to Republican ====
- Colfax
- De Baca
- Harding
- Torrance

==== Counties that flipped from Republican to Democratic ====
- Doña Ana

== Notes ==
Partisan clients
