= Augustus T. Seymour =

American judge (1907–1965)

Augustus T. "Joe" Seymour (March 1, 1907 – December 21, 1965) was a justice of the New Mexico Supreme Court from July 8, 1953, to December 15, 1954, when he was defeated for reelection. He had been appointed by Governor Edwin L. Mecham July 8, 1953.

Born in Columbus, Ohio, Seymour graduated from Princeton University in 1929 and from Harvard Law School in 1932, gaining admission to the bar in New Mexico the following year. Seymour was a founding member of the Modrall Law Firm in Albuquerque, having joined the firm with Judge John F. Simms and James R. ("Dick") Modrall in 1937. He served in the United States Army for four years during World War II, attaining the rank of captain. In 1953, Governor Edwin L. Mechem appointed Seymour to the New Mexico Supreme Court. Seymour was defeated in a bid for reelection to the seat the following year.

He was president of the New Mexico State Bar Foundation and was New Mexico's delegate to the American Bar Association. Seymour died at the age of 58 in Albuquerque, of cancer.

Political offices
Preceded by Henry G. Coors	Justice of the New Mexico Supreme Court; 1953–1954	Succeeded by Henry A. Kiker
