= Hilton A. Dickson Jr. =

American politician

Attorney General of New Mexico
- In office 1959–1960
- Governor: John Burroughs
- Preceded by: Frank B. Zinn
- Succeeded by: Earl E. Hartley

Personal details
- Born: February 20, 1924
- Died: June 20, 1985 (aged 61)
- Party: Democratic
- Education: Tulane University

Hilton A. Dickson Jr. (February 20, 1924 – June 20, 1985) was an American politician. He served as attorney general of New Mexico from 1959 to 1960.

== Life and career ==
Dickson attended Tulane University.

Dickson served as attorney general of New Mexico from 1959 to 1960.

Dickson died on June 20, 1985, at the age of 61.
