= Clarence J. Roberts =

American judge (1873–1931)

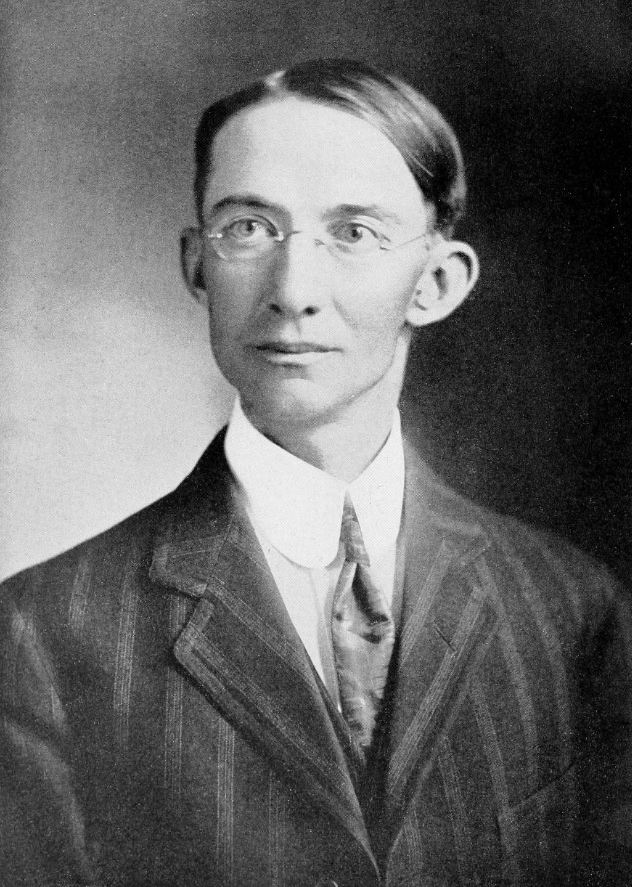

Justice of the New Mexico Supreme Court
- In office January 10, 1912 – January 21, 1921

Member of the New Mexico House of Representatives
- In office 1909

Personal details
- Born: October 21, 1873 Jefferson County, Indiana, US
- Died: January 27, 1931 (aged 57) Santa Fe, New Mexico, US
- Political party: Republican

Clarence J. Roberts (October 21, 1873 – January 27, 1931) was a justice of the New Mexico Supreme Court from January 10, 1912, until his retirement on January 21, 1921.

== Biography ==
Born in Jefferson County, Indiana on October 21, 1873, in 1892 Roberts began reading law in the Madison, Indiana office of attorney Perry E. Bear. Roberts gained admission to the bar in Indiana in 1894, at the relatively young age of 21, and in 1899 was elected county attorney of Jefferson County. Roberts remained in that office until 1905, then moved to Colfax County, New Mexico, in 1907, and was elected as a Republican to the New Mexico House of Representatives in 1909. In 1910, he was elected to serve in the state Constitutional Convention. Soon after, President William Howard Taft appointed him to the New Mexico Territorial Supreme Court. He was elected to the court following New Mexico's admission to statehood, taking office as chief justice in January 1912. After serving in that capacity for five years, Roberts was reelected to an eight-year term as an associate justice on the court in 1917, but resigned in 1921 to return to private practice. He then pursued various business ventures, obtaining substantial real estate holdings in the state.

Roberts died at his home in Santa Fe on January 27, 1931, following a bout of indigestion after several years of declining health.

Political offices
Preceded by Newly established court	Justice of the New Mexico Supreme Court; 1912–1921	Succeeded by Stephen B. Davis Jr.
