= 2005 Albuquerque mayoral election =

Election in Albuquerque, New Mexico, USA

- October 4, 2005
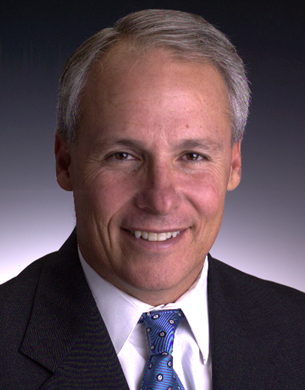

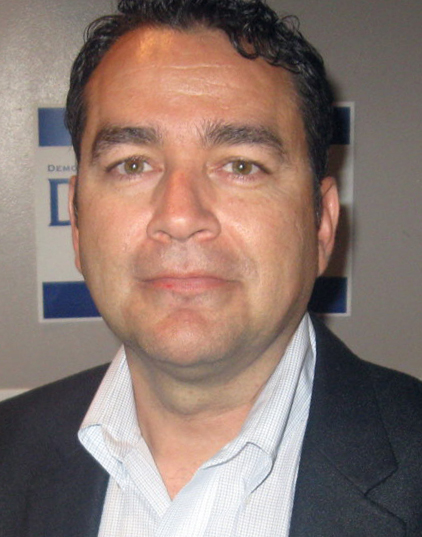

Candidate	Martin Chávez	Eric Griego	Brad Winter
Party	Nonpartisan	Nonpartisan	Nonpartisan
Popular vote	41,092	22,560	21,779
Percentage	47.08%	25.84%	24.95%
Mayor before election
Martin Chávez
Nonpartisan
Elected mayor
Martin Chávez
Nonpartisan

The 2005 Albuquerque mayoral election took place on October 4, 2005. Incumbent Mayor Martin Chávez ran for re-election to a second consecutive term, and third term overall. Chávez faced four challengers: City Council President Brad Winter, City Councilor Eric Griego, former State Secretary of Transportation Judy Espinosa, and environmental planning commission member David Steele. Though Chávez's ex-wife, Margaret Aragón de Chávez, considered running against him, she ultimately declined to do so.

During the campaign, Espinosa was disqualified from the ballot for submitting insufficient signatures. Though a district court judge initially allowed her to appear on the ballot, the city appealed to the New Mexico Supreme Court, which upheld Espinosa's disqualification but allowed her to seek additional signatures. Espinosa instead ended her campaign, concluding that she did not have enough time to gather enough signatures.

The election was the first one since 1995 to require a runoff election if no candidate received 40 percent of the vote. The city charter required runoff elections, but a district court judge struck down the requirement in 1997, concluding that it violated the state constitution. In 2004, voters approved a constitutional amendment allowing municipalities to require runoff elections.

Chávez ultimately won re-election by a wide margin, winning 47 percent of the vote to Griego's 26 percent and Winter's 25 percent, becoming the first mayor in city history to win two consecutive terms.

== General election ==
=== Candidates ===
- Martin Chávez, incumbent Mayor
- Eric Griego, City Councilor
- Brad Winter, City Council President
- David Steele, member of the city Environmental Planning Commission

==== Dropped out ====
- Judy Espinosa, former Secretary of the New Mexico Department of Transportation

==== Declined ====
- Margaret Aragón de Chávez, former educator, ex-wife of Martin Chávez

=== Polling ===
Poll source	Date(s) administered	Sample size (Note: Key: A – all adults RV – registered voters LV – likely voters V – unclear)	Margin of error	Martin Chávez	Eric Griego	Brad Winter	David Steele	Others	Undecided
Research & Polling Inc.	August 17–18, 2005	501 (LV)	± 4.4%	40%	13%	11%	3%	2%	31%
Research & Polling Inc.	September 29–30, 2005	500 (LV)	± 4.4%	43%	19%	19%	3%	—	17%

=== Results ===
2005 Albuquerque mayoral election results
Party	Candidate	Votes	%
Nonpartisan	Martin Chávez (inc.)	41,092	47.08%
Nonpartisan	Eric Griego	22,560	25.84%
Nonpartisan	Brad Winter	21,779	24.95%
Nonpartisan	David Steele	1,859	2.13%
Total votes		87,290	100.00%
