= Raúl Torrez =

American politician (born 1976)

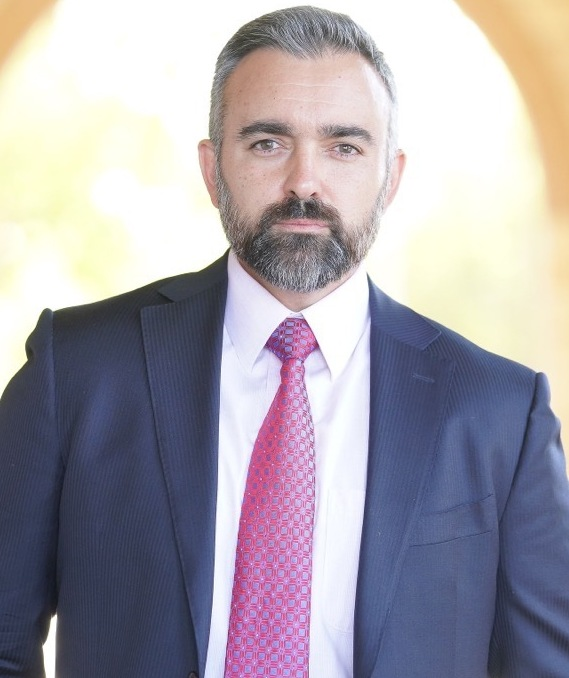

32nd Attorney General of New Mexico
- Incumbent
- Assumed office January 1, 2023
- Governor: Michelle Lujan Grisham; Deb Haaland (elect)
- Preceded by: Hector Balderas

District Attorney of Bernalillo County
- In office January 1, 2017 – January 1, 2023
- Preceded by: Kari Brandenburg
- Succeeded by: Sam Bregman

Personal details
- Born: July 24, 1976 (age 50) Albuquerque, New Mexico, U.S.
- Party: Democratic
- Spouse: Nasha
- Children: 2
- Education: Harvard University (AB); London School of Economics (MS); Stanford University (JD)

Raúl Torrez (born July 24, 1976) is an American lawyer and politician serving as the attorney general of New Mexico since 2023. Previously, he was the district attorney of Bernalillo County from 2017 to 2023. He is a member of the Democratic Party.

Torrez was first elected in 2022.

== Early life and education ==
Torrez's father, Presiliano Torrez, was a federal prosecutor and his mother taught Spanish at Sandia Preparatory School. He graduated from Sandia Prep, and then attended Harvard University, where he graduated cum laude with a Bachelor of Arts in government. He earned a Master of Science in IPE from the London School of Economics, and then worked for the Cesar Chavez Foundation in Los Angeles before attending Stanford Law School, earning his Juris Doctor.

== Career ==
After graduating from Stanford Law School in 2005, Torrez became an assistant district attorney in Valencia County, New Mexico. The next year, he took a job in the office of the New Mexico attorney general. In 2008, Torrez was chief counsel to Ben Luján, the speaker of the New Mexico House of Representatives, and then he served as a White House Fellow in the class of 2009–2010 during the presidency of Barack Obama. He returned to Albuquerque to work in the United States attorney's office and operated a solo law firm.

Torrez won the Democratic Party nomination for district attorney of Bernalillo County, New Mexico, in 2016. George Soros, a major liberal donor, provided $100,000 to support his campaign. Torrez won the general election without opposition from a Republican.

=== Attorney General of New Mexico ===
With incumbent attorney general Hector Balderas unable to seek reelection in 2022 due to term limits, Torrez announced his candidacy to succeed him in May 2021. Torrez won the Democratic nomination, defeating New Mexico State Auditor Brian Colón, and faced Republican Jeremy Gay. Torrez won the election and assumed office in January 2023. Torrez won a second term in 2026.

Tenure

Since taking office, Torrez has focused on issues including child safety, consumer protection, environmental enforcement, and government transparency.

Environmental litigation and natural resources

The attorney general’s office has participated in litigation related to public access to waterways and environmental contamination. In March 2025, the Fourth Judicial District Court issued a permanent injunction preventing landowners in Terrero from blocking public access to the Pecos River. The office has also filed lawsuits against DuPont and the United States Department of Defense regarding contamination associated with per- and polyfluoroalkyl substances (PFAS).

Consumer protection actions

During Torrez’s tenure, the attorney general’s office conducted investigations and enforcement actions involving consumer protection and healthcare access. These included an investigation into Memorial Medical Center concerning allegations that uninsured patients were denied certain medical services, which resulted in settlement agreements with the hospital.

The office has also investigated alleged price gouging following natural disasters, addressed infrastructure and service issues affecting residents of mobile home parks in Alamogordo, and participated in regulatory proceedings concerning a proposed rate increase by the electric utility Public Service Company of New Mexico.

Multistate litigation

Torrez has participated in several multistate legal actions involving antitrust and federal policy issues. He joined attorneys general from multiple states in litigation opposing the proposed merger between Kroger and Albertsons.

He has also joined multistate litigation involving Ticketmaster and lawsuits concerning alleged monopolistic practices by Google.

In addition, Torrez joined attorneys general from several states in a lawsuit challenging the authority granted to Elon Musk in connection with the federal Department of Government Efficiency (DOGE), raising constitutional questions related to executive authority and oversight.

Social media litigation and youth safety

During Torrez’s tenure, the New Mexico Department of Justice filed lawsuits against social media companies including Meta Platforms and Snap Inc. The lawsuits allege that the companies’ platforms expose minors to harmful content and that their design and moderation practices do not adequately prevent exploitation or unsafe interactions involving young users.

The attorney general’s office has also conducted undercover investigations into online child exploitation through initiatives described as Operation MetaPhile and Operation Overwatch. According to the office, the operations targeted individuals suspected of online exploitation and resulted in arrests in several cases.

Anti-hazing and cyberbullying legislation

Torrez has supported legislation addressing hazing and cyberbullying in schools and youth organizations in New Mexico. The proposal categorizes hazing offenses by severity and establishes penalties ranging from misdemeanors to second-degree felonies in cases involving death. The legislation also includes provisions requiring educational and prevention programs in schools and youth organizations.

Missing and Murdered Indigenous People initiative

The New Mexico Department of Justice launched an online portal focused on cases involving Missing and Murdered Indigenous People (MMIP). The portal provides case information and updates and is intended to assist coordination between law enforcement agencies and Indigenous communities.

== Personal life ==
Torrez's wife, Nasha, is also an attorney and is a dean at the University of New Mexico. They have two children.

== Electoral history ==
2022 New Mexico Attorney General election
Party	Candidate	Votes	%
Democratic	Raúl Torrez	388,592	55.3
Republican	Jeremy Gay	314,023	44.6
Total votes		702,615	100.0

Legal offices
Preceded by Hector Balderas	Attorney General of New Mexico; 2023–present	Incumbent
