= Grand Lodge of New Mexico =

Masonic lodge

Grand Lodge of New Mexico A.F. & A.M.
- Seal of the Grand Lodge of New Mexico; A.F. & A.M.
- Established: August 7, 1877
- Location: US
- Region served: New Mexico
- Website: nmmasons.org

The Grand Lodge of Ancient, Free And Accepted Masons of New Mexico is the oldest and largest of the two regular Masonic Grand Lodges in the State of New Mexico. It was founded on August 7, 1877, in Santa Fe, New Mexico.

== Freemasonry in early New Mexico ==
No records exist of any Masonic lodge in the area of the upper Rio Grande before the arrival of military units of the United States in 1846 as the Mexican–American War broke out between Mexico and the U.S. There may have been Masons among the trappers and traders who ventured into the northern territories of Mexico, later to become New Mexico, but no lodges were ever chartered in the area before the arrival of the U.S. Army. Missouri Military Lodge No.86 had been established in Independence, Missouri, and had accompanied its associated military unit throughout the theater of conflict, meeting in Santa Fe, El Paso, and Santa Cruz, Chihuahua, Mexico. When its military unit returned east, No.86 went with it. Hardin Military Lodge No.87 was established by the Grand Lodge of Missouri in October 1847, the first Masonic Lodge formed in what would be New Mexico. Lodge No.87 also traveled place to place with the unit to which it was attached, and held meetings in several locations in New Mexico, including Albuquerque, Santa Fe, and Las Vegas. The life of Hardin Lodge was designed to be limited from its founding, allowed to exist only for the duration of the military conflict with Mexico, and to be disbanded within six months after the conclusion of hostilities.

Immediately following the demise of Hardin No.87 in 1848, Freemasons residing in Santa Fe—capital of the territory which had been ceded to the United States that same year in the Treaty of Guadalupe Hidalgo—petitioned Missouri for a charter to establish a new lodge. On August 12, 1851, Montezuma No.109 was established, and for eleven years was the only active lodge in New Mexico. Some of the early leading men in the New Mexico Territory joined Freemasonry at the new lodge in Santa Fe, including Lafayette Head, prominent merchant, U.S. Marshall, and later to be the first Lieutenant Governor of Colorado; famed trapper and scout Kit Carson; and Ceran St. Vrain, founder of the Santa Fe Gazette newspaper.

Pages of the Montezuma Lodge No.109 visitors ledger, with entries from 1861, including the names of Christopher "Kit" Carson, Miguel A. Otero, and Charles Bowmer

Two other lodges were later founded at Fort Union. Chapman Lodge No.95 in 1861, named for Lt. Colonel William Chapman, the commanding officer of Fort Union., and Union Lodge No.480 in 1874 were chartered at the fort, and would later move off of the military plat and become permanent, local lodges. Chapman No.95 was relocated to Las Vegas, and Union No.480 relocated from the fort to the nearby village of La Junta (later called Watrous) and is now in Wagon Mound.

== Formation of the Grand Lodge of New Mexico ==
The distance of New Mexico from Missouri left the lodges in the Territory out of touch with their Grand Lodge for long periods of time. Many days of travel on horseback over 1000 miles of the Santa Fe Trail was necessary to reach the governing Masonic authority. This inevitably resulted in poor communication and frustration for the lodges. A total of eight lodges were chartered in New Mexico by the Grand Lodge of Missouri after the removal or demise of the two purely military lodges associated with regiments active in the Mexican-American War:

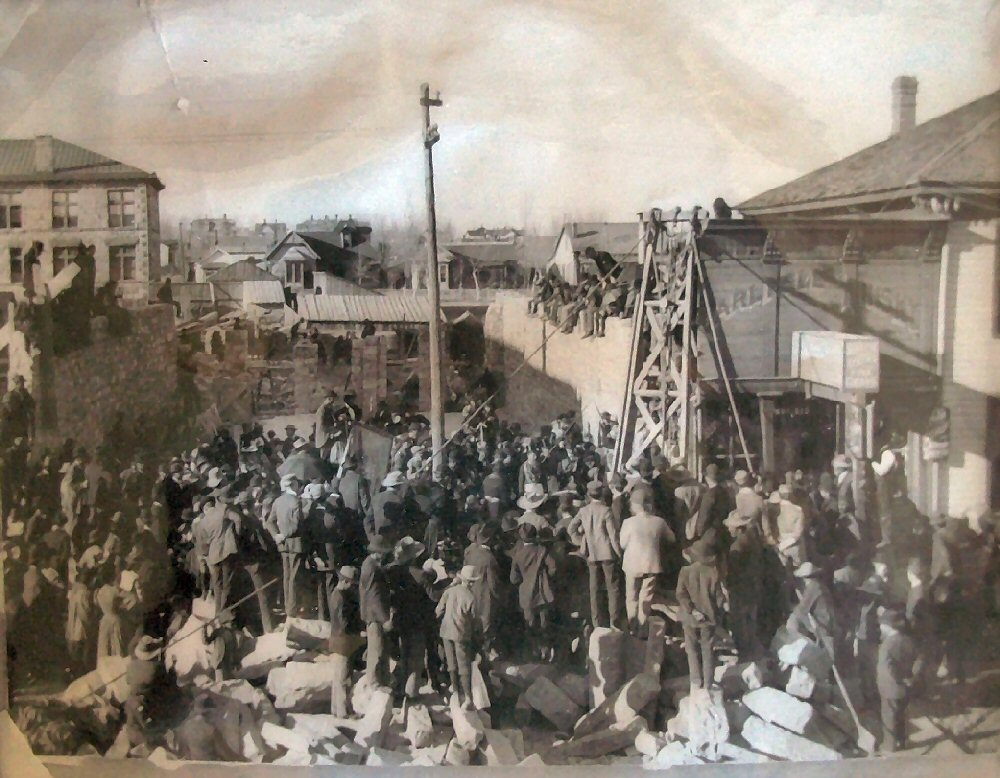
Laying the cornerstone of Chapman Lodge No.2, Las Vegas, New Mexico, 1884

Lodge	Charter date	Location
Montezuma No.109	1851	Santa Fe
Bent Lodge No.204	1860	Taos
Chapman No.95	1866	Ft. Union, later Las Vegas
Aztec No.108	1867	Las Cruces
Kit Carson No.326	1869	Elizabethtown
Silver City No.465	1873	Silver City
Union No.480	1874	Ft. Union, later La Junta
Cimarron No.348	1875	Cimarron

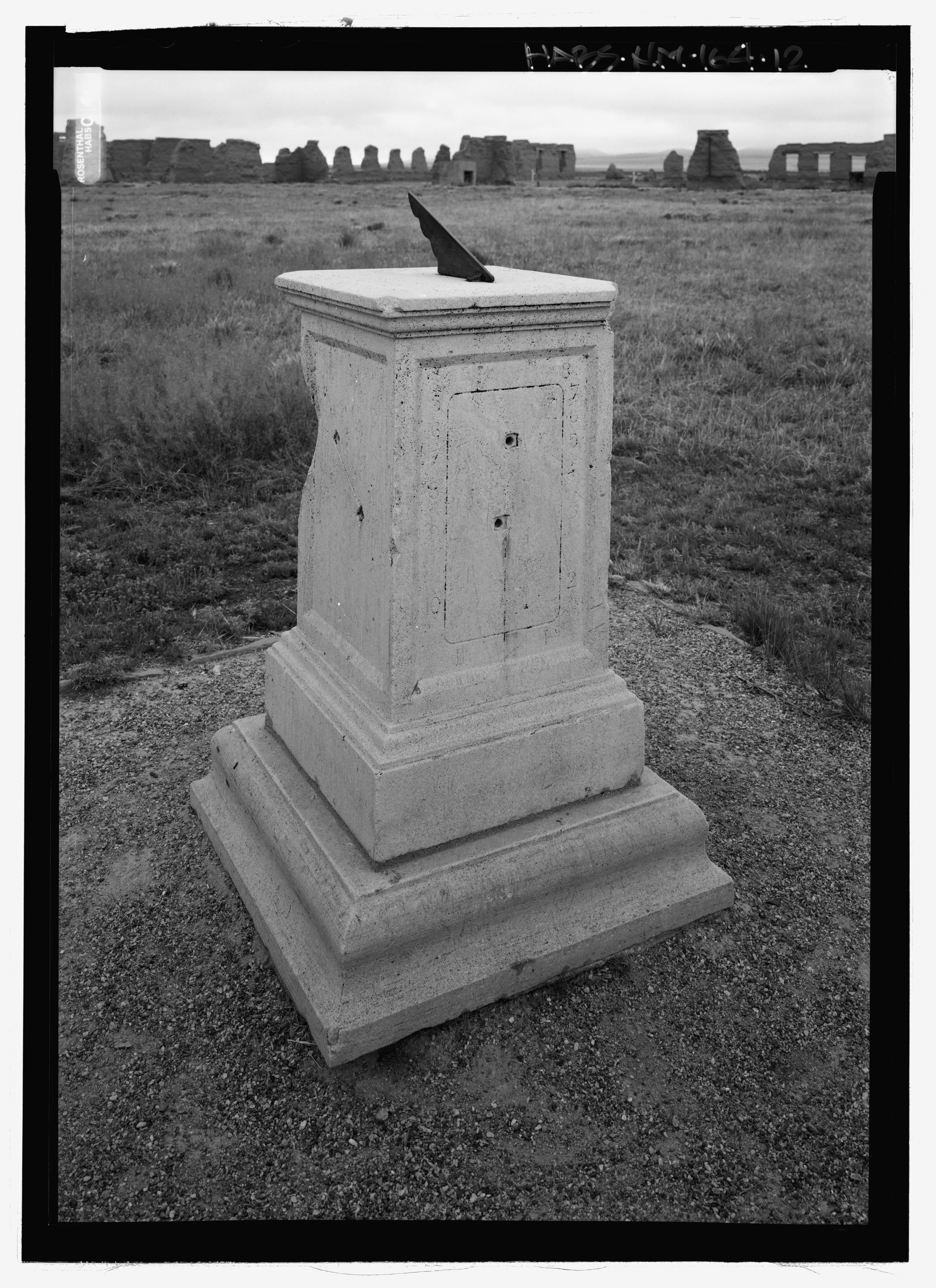
View of the sundial - Fort Union, State Highway No. 161, Watrous, Mora County, NM HABS NM-164-12

Several of these original lodges quickly faltered. By 1877, when representatives met in Santa Fe to form the Grand Lodge of New Mexico, Kit Carson and Bent Lodges had folded, and Cimarron was only a few months away from a similar fate. Of the remaining five lodges, Silver City No.465 opposed the idea of breaking with Missouri, reflecting a standing regional conflict which pitted the powerful, landed class of the Santa Fe Ring against dusty backwater hamlets like Silver City. The other four lodges in the Territory: Montezuma, Chapman, Aztec, and Union all voted in favor of forming the new Grand Lodge.

Eight men, William W. Griffin, Gustave Elsberg, A.Z. Huggins, George W. Stebbins, W.B. Stapp, William L. Rynerson, John S Crouch, and S.B. Newcomb, convened on the 6th of August in the second-floor rooms of Montezuma Lodge on the Santa Fe Plaza, above the offices of the Santa Fe New Mexican, the first newspaper published in the Territory. Over ensuing four days, a Constitution and set of by-laws were adopted, officers were elected, and the ritual of the Grand Lodge of Missouri was adopted. The Grand Lodge of New Mexico officially came into being on the 7th of August, with the installation of the Grand Officers, accomplished with the help of Masonic representatives from Colorado and Ohio.

The four lodges which voted to form the new Grand Lodge were given new numbers in anticipation of their new charters from the emerging jurisdiction. The lodges' numbers were ordered according to the dates of their original chartering by Missouri, resulting in Montezuma No.1, Chapman No.2, Aztec No.3, and Union No.4. The defiant lodge at Silver City eventually relented (only after the Territorial Legislature moved to provide public schools in Silver City), joining the Grand Lodge of New Mexico in 1882. Their new charter was at that time given No.8, regardless of their historical precedence of origin, predating the lodges which were numbered 5-7.

== Expansion of Freemasonry in New Mexico ==
=== Railroad lodges ===
Freemasonry was established early in New Mexico's time as a territory of the United States, and Masonic lodges began to spring up in many areas where American immigrants increasingly settled. This phenomenon was highly accelerated by the extension of railroads into the Territory, starting in 1879. In 1880 the railroad reached Albuquerque, and in 1881 Temple Lodge No.6 was chartered. Gate City Lodge No.11 was established in Raton, where the Atchison, Topeka and Santa Fe Railway first crossed the pass into New Mexico three years prior. The Southern Pacific Railroad joined two lines coming from the east and west at Deming in 1881, and in 1883 Deming Lodge No.12 was formed. When the Santa Fe Railroad built shops at San Marcial in 1880, a community began to grow up around them, and in 1885 there were enough Masons living there to found Hiram Lodge No.13, which became known as one of the "railroad Lodges." Logging and grazing in the area of Chama, New Mexico led to the extension of a line into the valley in the late 1880s, and Chama Lodge No.17 was chartered in 1889. The trend continued for as long as the railroad boom was maintained, well into the 20th century. Many Lodges in New Mexico, including Bethlehem, Chama, Tucumcari, and Hiram still display images of Gilded Age locomotives on their banners in homage to their history.

=== Mining lodges ===
Another industry which drove the chartering of new lodges in New Mexico was mining. Several lodges were founded in the Territory, and later the State, shoulder to shoulder with operations and towns as the mineral-rich area was parceled out for mining. Silver City Lodge No.8 (chartered as No.465 by the Grand Lodge of Missouri), took its name from the mining town in which it was built in 1873. Other lodges were later chartered in the same area as mining boomed, including Mimbres No.10, which was tied to silver mining at Georgetown. Hurley, New Mexico was founded as a town to house and serve the workers of the open pit copper mine started by the Chino Copper Mine Company at Santa Rita in 1910, and Hurley Lodge No. 55 was started as a "Masonic Club" in 1911, receiving its charter in 1919. Not far away to the northeast of the lodges around Silver City, Kingston Lodge No.16 was founded in 1889 in Kingston, NM, but soon moved east to Hillsboro as the mines declined in the area of the original location, and the population moved to live near new ones opened about 10 miles away.

=== Cowboy lodges ===
As farming and ranching expanded and new towns were settled, Masonic lodges followed. Animas Lodge No.15 in Farmington was founded in 1887 as settlers from Colorado arrived to pursue agriculture in the rich valley. The lodge itself first met the same year that the county was organized, and fourteen years before the town was incorporated. San Juan Lodge No.25 was founded in nearby Aztec, New Mexico in 1905. Portales Lodge No.26 was established by homesteaders in 1903, five years after the area was irrigated. Elida Lodge No.31 was erected by homesteaders turned ranchers in 1907. Cimarron Lodge No.37 had been chartered in 1875 by the Grand Lodge of Missouri but quickly folded. The lodge was revived in 1908, and included some members from the original lodge.

== Freemasonry and New Mexico statehood ==
Freemasons figure heavily in the establishment of New Mexico as a state. 25 of the 99 delegates who attended the 1910 Constitutional Convention were Freemasons, according to the biographical notes in the convention yearbook. Far from constituting a voting block, the Freemason delegates at the convention came from across the state, and across the socio-economic and political spectra. Nine were Republicans (who dominated the convention with about two thirds of the delegates), fifteen were Democrats, and one was a Socialist. Three of the delegates who were Freemasons were Past Grand Masters of the Grand Lodge, namely Elias S. Stover (1900), Arthur H. Harllee (1901), and James G. Fitch (1905). The most influential Mason at the Convention, however, was Thomas B. Catron, a leading member of the so-called Santa Fe Ring and one of the largest landowners in the United States.

== Ritual and Masonic lineage ==
The Grand Lodge of New Mexico descends directly from the Grand Lodge of Missouri, and elected to remain an "Ancient" Masonic jurisdiction, in deference to that Mother Grand Lodge. The Masonic ritual of Missouri was adopted at the institution of the Grand Lodge of New Mexico, and was practiced without significant alteration for over half a century. The adopted ritualㅡthe same ritual which had already been in use by lodges in the Territory for decadesㅡwas immediately put to use by the newly-formed Grand Lodge, as its officers conferred the Masonic Third Degree on two gentlemen over the ensuing two evenings. The second of these men was Max Frost, who would be elected as the eighth Grand Master of the State, in 1885.

The Masonic designation styled as "Ancient" for the Grand Lodge of New Mexico is derived from its lineage tracing back to the Grand Lodge of North Carolina (via the Grand Lodges of Missouri and Tennessee), which was founded as a Grand Lodge of Ancient York Masons in 1787.

== Mutual Recognition with Prince Hall Masonry in New Mexico ==
The Grand Lodge of New Mexico was the fifteenth state Grand Lodge to formally and fully recognize its sister Prince Hall Grand Lodge. On November 16, 1996, an agreement referred to as the "Compact" was signed by Omer E. Horn, Grand Master of the Grand Lodge of New Mexico, and Harold H. Bendaw, Grand Master of the Prince Hall Grand Lodge of New Mexico. The Compact extended "full and complete fraternal recognition" between the two Grand Lodges, and extended "to the respective members of each, all of the rights of a Master Mason [...]"

== Appendant Masonic bodies in New Mexico ==
The Grand Lodge of New Mexico recognizes several appendant bodies operating in its jurisdiction, including the York Rite, the Scottish Rite, and the Shrine.

=== York Rite ===
The first Chapter of Royal Arch Masons was organized as Santa Fe Chapter No.1 in 1865. A Commandery of Knights Templars, Santa Fe Commandery No.1 was established in 1871. Deming Council No.1, chartered in 1889, was the first Council of Royal and Select Masters.

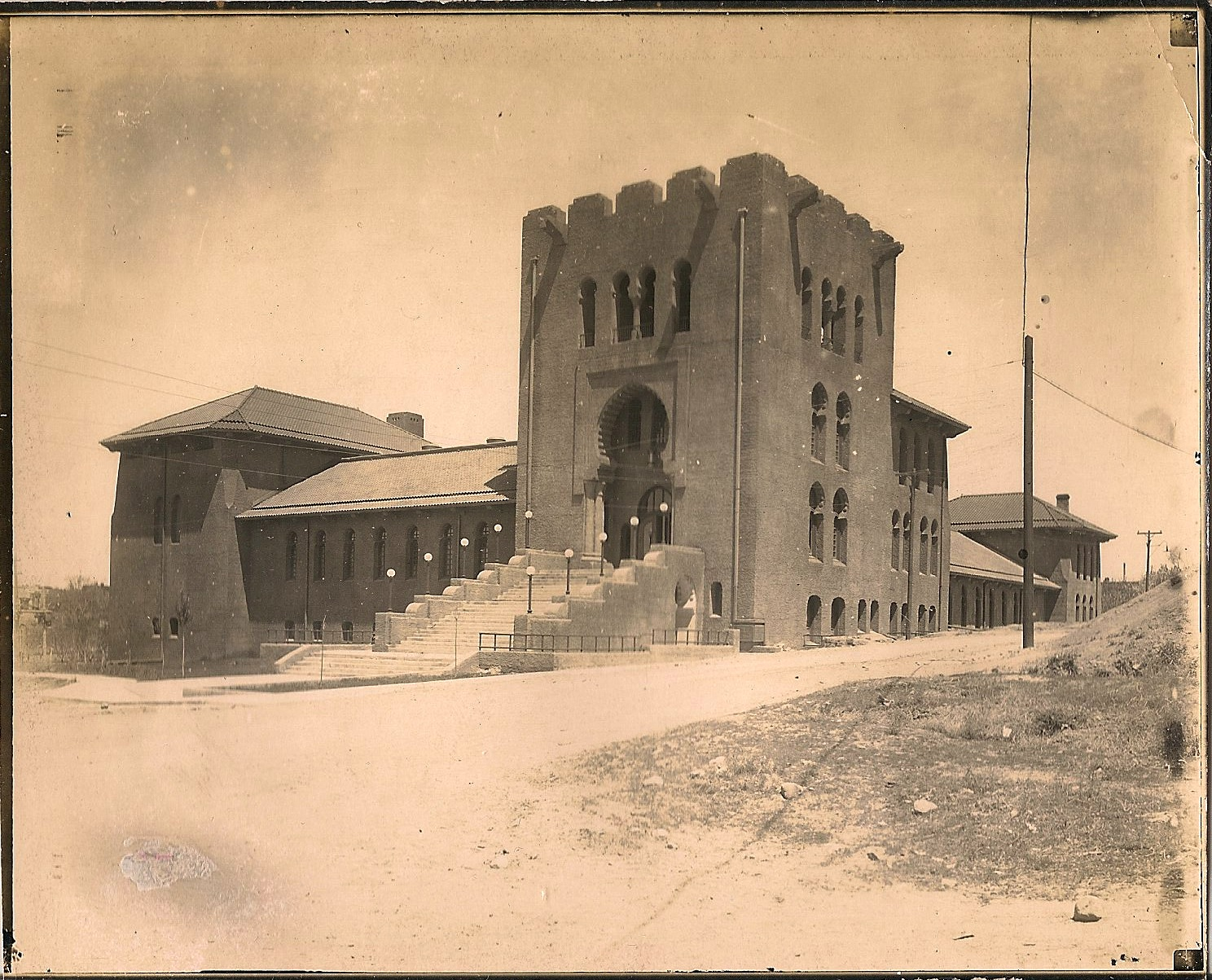

=== Scottish Rite ===
The chartering of Santa Fe Lodge of Perfection No.1 established Scottish Rite Masonry in the Territory in 1886. Local chapters of the remaining three Scottish Rite bodies (Aztlan Chapter of Rose Croix, Coronado Council of Kadosh, and New Mexico Consistory) completed the Scottish Rite system of Masonry in Santa Fe. In 1912, the Scottish Rite Temple was completed in Santa Fe, and remains the most important Masonic building in the state.

=== Shriners ===
The Ancient Arabic Order, Nobles of the Mystic Shrine organized Ballut Abyad Temple in Albuquerque in 1889.

=== Other appendant bodies ===
The Order of the Eastern Star established its first Chapter in New Mexico, Queen Esther Chapter No.1, in 1902. New Mexico also maintains bodies of Societas Rosicruciana and Order of the Amaranth, as well as Councils of the Allied Masonic Degrees and Chapters of National Sojourners.

== Notable Freemasons in New Mexico ==
- Clinton P. Anderson - US Secretary of Agriculture under President Harry S. Truman; U.S. Representative and Senator (Albuquerque Lodge No.60)
- Samuel Beach Axtell - Ninth Territorial Governor of New Mexico, 1875-1878; Chief Justice of the New Mexico Territorial Supreme Court, 1882-1885 (Montezuma Lodge No.1)

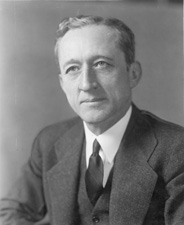
Carl Atwood Hatch

- Charles Bent - first civilian Territorial Governor of New Mexico; killed during the Taos Revolt (Montezuma No.1)
- David R. Boyd - President of the University of New Mexico, 1912-19 (Temple Lodge No.6)
- Sam G. Bratton - U.S. Senator 1925-1933 and Federal Judge in the Tenth Circuit Court of Appeals (Clovis Lodge No.40)
- Charles R. Brice - Chief Justice of the NM Supreme Court, 1935-1950 (Roswell Lodge No.18)
- Christopher "Kit" Carson - famous trapper, trader, scout, and soldier (Montezuma Lodge No.109, Bent Lodge No.204)
- Thomas B. Catron - territorial legislator, U.S. Senator; one of the largest landowners in U.S. history (Montezuma No.1)
- Albert Jennings Fountain - Union Army Colonel, 1st Regiment New Mexico Volunteer Cavalry; prominent Mesilla lawyer and defense attorney for Billy the Kid, prosecutor in the Lincoln County War; disappeared 1896; member of Texas State Senate and 14th Lieutenant Governor of Texas (Aztec Lodge No.3)
- Richard H. Hanna - Justice of the NM Supreme Court 1912-1918; Grand Master of New Mexico 1920 (Montezuma No.1)
- Arthur T. Hannett - Seventh Governor of New Mexico 1925-1927 (Lebanon Lodge No.22)
- Carl Hatch - U.S. Senator, namesake of the Hatch Act of 1939 (Clovis Lodge No.40)
- Elias Turner Hensley - Chief Justice of the NM Court of Appeals 1966; Grand Master of New Mexico 1951 (Portales Lodge No.26)
- James F. Hinkle - fifth Governor of New Mexico, 1923-1925 (Roswell Lodge No.18)

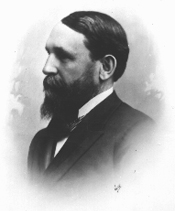
Elias Sleeper Stover

- Joab Houghton - first Chief Justice of the New Mexico provisional government (1846-1851); Justice of the New Mexico Territorial Supreme Court (Montezuma Lodge No.109, Bent Lodge No.204, Aztec Lodge No.108)
- Alpheus Keen - Grand Secretary of New Mexico 1884-1946, making him the longest-serving Masonic officer in history (Chapman Lodge No.2)
- Thomas J. Mabry - fourteenth Governor of New Mexico, 1947-1951 (Temple Lodge No.6)
- James B. McGhee - Associate Justice of the NM Supreme Court, 1947-1960 (Roswell Lodge No.18)
- Merritt Cramer Mechem - Fifth Governor of New Mexico, 1921-1923. (Montezuma Lodge No.1?)
- John Gaw Meem - Key proponent of the Pueblo Revival architectural style, and one of New Mexico's most famous and important architects. (Montezuma Lodge No.1)
- John Milne - Superintendent of Albuquerque Public Schools, 1911-1956; Grand Master of New Mexico, 1933
- Victor L. Minter - instrumental in establishing and promoting Carlsbad Caverns National Park; Grand Master of New Mexico, 1930 (Eddy Lodge No.21); Grand Master of The Independent Order of Odd Fellows of New Mexico, 1915-1916.
- Miguel Antonio Otero (born 1859) - sixteenth Territorial Governor of New Mexico, 1897-1906; U.S. Marshal of the Canal Zone, 1917-1921 (Montezuma Lodge No. 1, Chapman Lodge No.2)
- L. Bradford Prince - Chief Justice of the NM Supreme Court, 1879-1882; Fourteenth Territorial Governor of New Mexico, 1889-1893; archaeologist and collector
- Herman E. Roser - Assistant Secretary of Energy for defense programs under Ronald Reagan, 1981-1984; Grand Master, 1980 (Pajarito Lodge No.66)
- Charles G. Sage - U.S. Army Brigadier General; commanded the Philippine Provisional Coast Artillery in World War II, imprisoned at Bataan (Deming Lodge No.12)
- Arthur Seligman - ninth Governor of New Mexico, 1931-1933 (Montezuma Lodge No.1)
- William Howard Shuster - creator of the Zozobra Festival; modern painter (Montezuma No.1)
- Elias S. Stover - first President of the University of New Mexico; prominent Albuquerque land developer; Grand Master of New Mexico, 1900 (Temple Lodge No.6)
- David Waldo - first doctor with a medical degree to practice in New Mexico (Montezuma Lodge No.1)

== Sources ==
- Langston, LaMoine (1977). A History of Masonry in New Mexico. Hall-Poorbaugh Press, Inc.
