= List of mayors of Albuquerque =

Mayor of Albuquerque
- Flag of Albuquerque

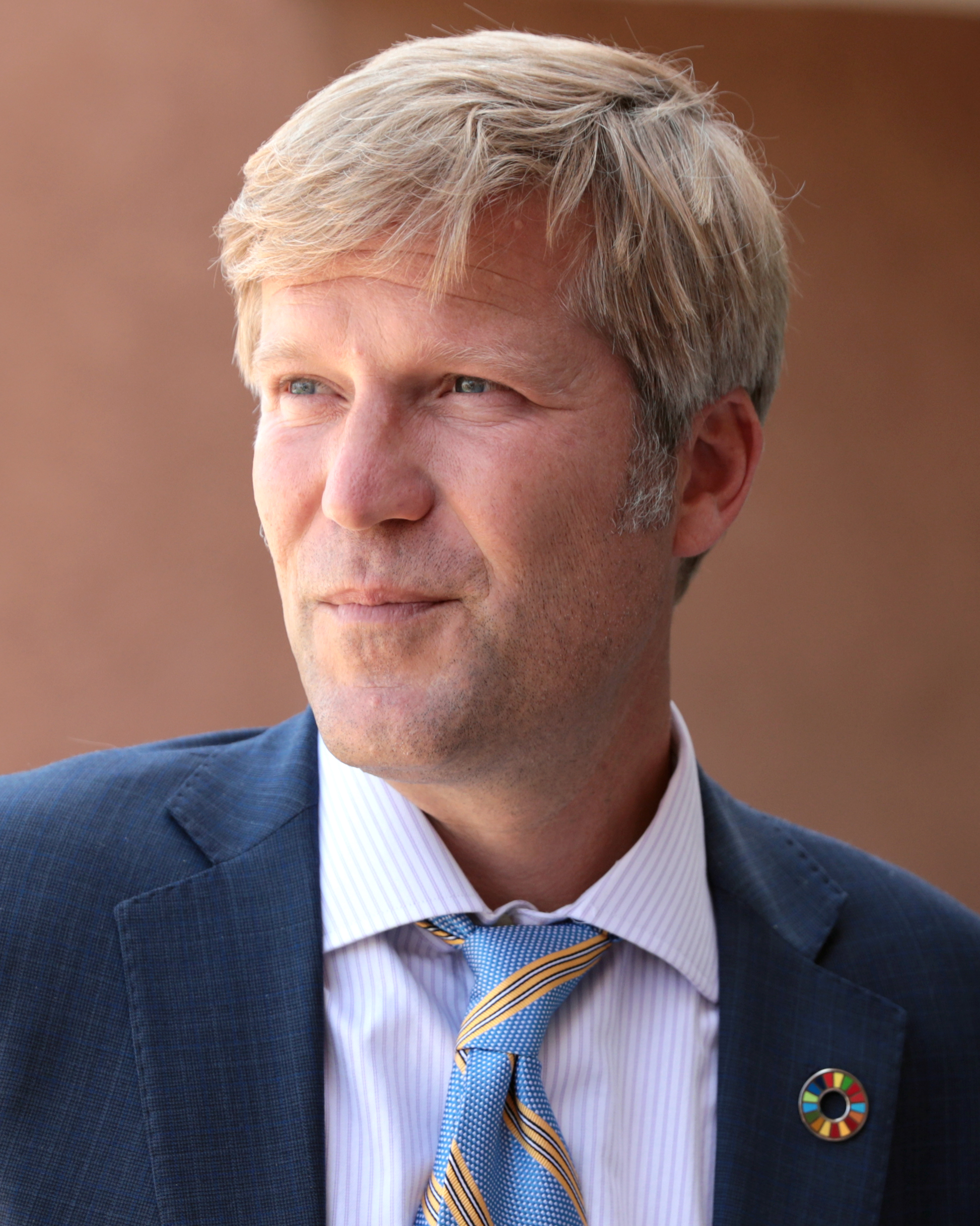
- Incumbent; Tim Keller since December 1, 2017
- Term length: Four years (No term limits)
- Formation: 1885
- Website: Office of the Mayor

The mayor of Albuquerque, New Mexico, is the chief executive officer of the city, elected for a four-year term. There are no term limits for the mayor. Under the New Mexico State Constitution, municipal elections are nonpartisan. The 30th and current mayor is Tim Keller, a Democrat.

== History ==
Henry N. Jaffa was elected the first mayor of Albuquerque in 1885. The city was governed by a mayor until the transition to a City Commission government in 1917. Under this system, the leader of city government in Albuquerque was the Chairman of the City Commission. In 1975, due to large growth in the city, voters replaced the commission system with a city council system. After the change occurred, voters once again elected a mayor.

== Duties and powers ==
Albuquerque has a strong mayor council form of government, giving the mayor the position of chief executive of the city. The mayor is given the authority to appoint and remove officials from city posts, and is required to propose a budget each year. Most of the mayor's appointments and proposals are subject to approval by the Albuquerque City Council, but the mayor has the power of veto or approval of City Council legislation. The organization of the mayor's office changes with administration, but is almost always governed by a chief of staff, deputy chief of staff, and director of communications.

== List of mayors ==
=== Mayor (1885–1917) ===
Mayor	Term	Party
Henry N. Jaffa	July 7, 1885 – April 13, 1886	Independent
George Lail	April 13, 1886 – April 12, 1887	Democratic
William B. Childers	April 14, 1887 – April 11, 1888	Democratic
Arthur E. Walker	April 11, 1888 – April 10, 1889	Republican
G. W. Meylert	April 10, 1889 – April 9, 1890	Republican
Michael Mandell	April 9, 1890 – April 15, 1891	Democratic
Joseph Exum Saint	April 15, 1891 – April 18, 1892	Republican
George S. Easterday	April 18, 1892 – April 17, 1893	Democratic
Neill Brooks Field	April 17, 1893 – April 21, 1894	Democratic
John F. Luthy	April 21, 1894 – April 15, 1895	Republican
Joseph C. Baldridge	April 15, 1895 – April 19, 1897	Republican
Strickland Aubright	April 19, 1897 – April 18, 1898	Republican
Frank Willey Clancy	April 18, 1898 – April 17, 1899	Republican
Owen N. Marron	April 17, 1899 – April 1902	Democratic
Charles F. Myers	April 1902 – April 1904	Republican
Frank McKee	April 1904 – April 1908	Republican
Felix H. Lester	April 1908 – April 1910	Democratic
John W. Elder	April 1910 – April 1912	Republican
D. K. B. Sellers	April 1912 – April 1914	Democratic
David H. Boatright	April 1914 – April 1916	Republican
Henry Westerfeld	April 1916 – December 3, 1917	Republican

=== Chairman of the City Commission (1917–1974) ===
Chairman of the City Commission	Term	Party
Charles F. Wade	December 4, 1917 – May 24, 1919 (Note: Died in office.)	Republican
Walter Connell	June 1919 – April 4, 1922	Democratic
William R. Walton	April 19, 1922 – December 19, 1922 (Note: Resigned from City Commission.)	Democratic
Edwin B. Swope	December 19, 1922 – February 23, 1925	Democratic
Clyde Tingley	February 25, 1925 – January 14, 1935	Democratic
Charles Henry Lembke	January 14, 1935 – January 29, 1938	Democratic
Clyde Elmer Oden	January 29, 1938 – October 11, 1939 (Note: Stepped down as chairman, but remained on City Commission.)	Democratic
Clyde Tingley	October 11, 1939 – April 9, 1946	Democratic
Albert E. Buck	April 9, 1946 – August 12, 1947	Republican
Frank W. Darrow	August 12, 1947 – October 10, 1947	Republican
Clyde Tingley	October 10, 1947 – January 27, 1948	Democratic
Ernest Everly	January 27, 1948 – October 2, 1951	Republican
Clyde Tingley	October 9, 1951 – April 13, 1954	Democratic
Maurice Sanchez	April 13, 1954 – April 10, 1962	Republican
Archie Westfall	April 10, 1962 – April 12, 1966	Republican
Ralph S. Trigg	April 18, 1966 – October 9, 1967	Republican
Pete V. Domenici	October 16, 1967 – March 3, 1970	Republican
Charles E. Barnhart	March 3, 1970 – October 11, 1971	Republican
Harry E. Kinney	October 11, 1971 – February 21, 1973	Republican
Louis E. Saavedra	February 21, 1973 – December 10, 1973	Democratic
Ray R. Baca	December 10, 1973 – April 1, 1974	Democratic
Richard G. Vaughan	April 1, 1974 – June 30, 1974	Republican

=== Mayor (since 1974) ===
Mayor	Term	Party
Harry E. Kinney	July 1, 1974 – November 1977	Republican
David Rusk	December 1977 – November 1981	Democratic
Harry E. Kinney	December 1981 – November 1985	Republican
Ken Schultz	December 1985 – November 1989	Democratic
Louis E. Saavedra	December 1989 – November 1993	Democratic
Martin Chávez	December 1993 – November 1997	Democratic
Jim Baca	December 1997 – November 2001	Democratic
Martin Chávez	December 2001 – November 2009	Democratic
Richard J. Berry	December 2009 – November 2017	Republican
Tim Keller	December 2017 – present	Democratic

== See also ==
- Timeline of Albuquerque, New Mexico
- History of Albuquerque, New Mexico
