= David Rusk =

American politician (1940–2025)

Mayor of Albuquerque
- In office December 1, 1977 – November 1981
- Preceded by: Harry E. Kinney
- Succeeded by: Harry E. Kinney

Personal details
- Born: October 10, 1940
- Died: November 24, 2025 (aged 85)
- Party: Democratic
- Relations: Dean Rusk (father)

David Patrick Rusk (October 10, 1940 – November 24, 2025) was an American politician. He served as mayor of Albuquerque, New Mexico, from 1977 to 1981. He was the son of United States Secretary of State Dean Rusk. Rusk was an alumnus of the University of California, Berkeley.

Rusk died on November 24, 2025, at the age of 85.
