= Frank B. Zinn =

American jurist (1920–2009)

Frank Zinn

Judge of the New Mexico District Court for the 11th district
- In office 1959–1975
- Appointed by: John Burroughs

18th Attorney General of New Mexico
- In office 1959
- Preceded by: Fred M. Standley
- Succeeded by: Hilton A. Dickson Jr.

Personal details
- Born: Frank Benjamin Zinn; December 24, 1920 Tucumcari, New Mexico, U.S.
- Died: May 2, 2009 (aged 88) Michigan, U.S.
- Resting place: Santa Fe National Cemetery
- Party: Democratic
- Relations: A. L. Zinn (father)
- Education: New Mexico Military Institute (AS)

Military service
- Branch/service: United States Army
- Unit: New Mexico National Guard
- Battles/wars: World War II

Frank B. Zinn (December 24, 1920 – May 2, 2009) was an American attorney, politician, and jurist who served as the 18th attorney general of New Mexico in 1959. From 1959 to 1975, he served as a judge of the New Mexico Eleventh Judicial District Court from 1959 to 1975.

== Early life and education ==
Zinn was born in Tucumcari, New Mexico, the son of A. L. Zinn, a justice of the New Mexico Supreme Court. He attended high school and junior college at the New Mexico Military Institute. He took classes at American University Washington College of Law until 1942.

== Career ==
During World War II, Frank served in the United States Army. He later served in the New Mexico National Guard before retiring in 1981 as a lieutenant colonel. He moved to Santa Fe, New Mexico in 1951 to serve as assistant to the Attorney General before entering private law practice with his father and brother, Dean, the following year. Zinn was elected attorney general of New Mexico in 1958 and assumed office in 1959. He resigned in June 1960 after being appointed as a judge of the New Mexico Eleventh Judicial District Court by then-Governor John Burroughs. Zinn served as a judge until 1975 and later worked as a special master and arbitration judge on federal courts.

== Personal life ==
Zinn was married to Anne Shaffer Zinn from 1950 until her death in 1999. After his wife's death, Zinn relocated to Michigan to be closer to his son, daughter-in-law, and grandchildren.
