= Daniel H. McMillan (American politician) =

American politician

Daniel Hugh McMillan (March 7, 1846 – June 2, 1908) was an American lawyer, politician, and judge.

== Life ==
McMillan was born on March 7, 1846, in York, New York, the son of Daniel McMillan and Margaret McNaughton. His father was a reverend. His mother had three brothers who sat in the Canadian parliament and a fourth who helped organize the state of Wisconsin and served in its legislature.

McMillan attended Le Roy Academy. He went to Cornell University from 1868 to 1869, and was in its first graduating class. He then moved to Buffalo and studied in the law firm Laning, Cleveland & Folsom, which future president Grover Cleveland was a member of. He was admitted to the state bar in 1872, and shortly afterwards he became a member of the law firm Laning, Gluck & MacMillan. The firm was later known as MacMillan, Gluck, Pooley & DePew, and it served as the local counsel for New York Central Railroad, Lake Shore and Michigan Southern Railway, Michigan Central Railroad, and West Shore Railroad.

In 1885, McMillan was elected to the New York State Senate as a Republican, representing New York's 31st State Senate district (Erie County). He served in the Senate in 1886 and 1887. In the Senate, he was Chairman of the Canal Committee and successfully passed a bill that provided for the strengthening of locks on the Erie Canal, which reduced transportation costs between the Great Lakes and tide water by as much as 40 percent. He wrote and passed bills that provided for a uniform fire insurance policy to be used by all companies in the state, created a commission to report the most humane execution method (which led to the state adapting the electric chair), authorized the use of Niagara Falls for power, reformed labor law and discipline, and regulated the employment of women in manufacturing establishments.

McMillan was nominated to the State Senate in 1887, but he declined the nomination. He was manager of the Buffalo Library from 1883 to 1889 and its president from 1889 to 1890, law examiner of admission to the bar in the New York 5th Judicial District from 1883 to 1894, manager of the Buffalo State Asylum from 1884 to 1899, a trustee of the State Normal School from 1887 to 1899, vice-president of the New York State Bar Association from 1887 to 1888, and a member of the New York Republican State Committee in 1887. He was an alternate delegate-at-large to the 1888, 1892, and 1896 Republican National Conventions and a delegate-at-large to the 1894 New York State Constitutional Convention, In 1899, he served on a commission to revise the state's educational laws.

When McMillan began to suffer from poor health, he moved West to recover and retired from his law firm. In 1900, President William McKinley appointed him an associate justice of the New Mexico Territorial Supreme Court. He was assigned to the Third Judicial District and moved to the district's headquarters in Socorro. He later moved to Las Cruces, and then to Denver, Colorado. In 1903, President Roosevelt removed him as Justice after United States Attorney General Philander C. Knox investigated and charged him with immorality. Influential friends of McMillan, including John G. Milburn, held up the hearings and tried to save his position.

McMillan was manager of the Buffalo State Hospital and a member of the Buffalo Historical Society, the Society of Natural Sciences, the American Bar Association, The Freemasons, the Shriners, and Chi Psi. He attended the Presbyterian Church. In 1872, he married Delphia Bethna Jackson. They had two sons, Morton Kemper and Laning Ross, both of whom went to Cornell. During World War I, Laning Ross enlisted in the Engineering Corps and was killed at action in Chéry-Chartreuve, France, in 1918.

McMillan died in Denver on June 2, 1908. He was buried in Forest Lawn Cemetery in Buffalo.

New York State Senate
Preceded by Robert C. Titus	New York State Senate; 31st District; 1886–1887	Succeeded by John Laughlin
