= Frank W. Parker =

American judge (1860–1932)

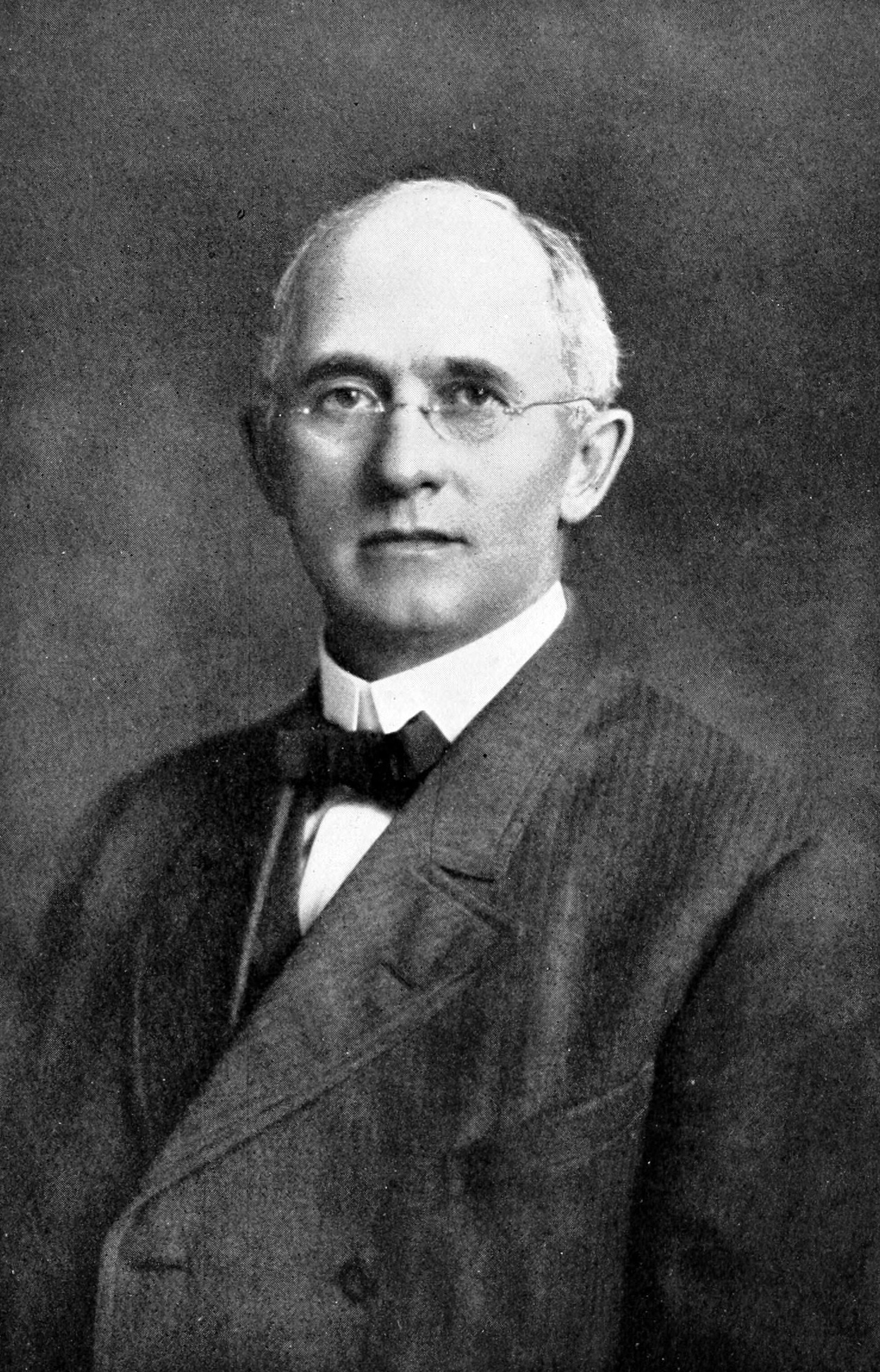
- Photograph from Representative New Mexicans, Vol. I (1912)

Justice of the New Mexico Supreme Court
- In office 1912–1932
- Preceded by: Newly established court
- Succeeded by: Tom W. Neal

Personal details
- Born: Frank Wilson Parker; October 16, 1860; Sturgis, Michigan, U.S.
- Died: August 3, 1932 (aged 71)
- Resting place: Fairview Cemetery, Santa Fe, New Mexico, U.S.
- Political party: Republican
- Spouse(s): Lillian L. Kinney (m. 1892; died 1893) Anna Davis (m. 1904)
- Children: 2
- Parent(s): James W. Parker; Maria Antoinette
- Education: University of Michigan Law School (LLB)
- Occupation: Judge

Frank Wilson Parker (October 16, 1860 – August 3, 1932) was an American judge who served on the New Mexico Supreme Court for 35 years, from its territorial period to after statehood.

Parker was born in Sturgis, Michigan, to James W. Parker and Maria Antoinette (Thompson). He earned a Bachelor of Laws from the University of Michigan Law School in 1880, and practiced law for a year in Sturgis before moving to Mesilla in New Mexico Territory in 1881. He moved in 1882 to Kingston, a mining town in Sierra County, and then to Hillsboro in 1883. He served as the Sierra County school superintendent from 1887 to 1889.

A Republican, Parker was appointed to serve on the Territorial Supreme Court on January 10, 1898 by President William McKinley, on the recommendation of territorial governor Miguel Antonio Otero. He was reappointed to the Territorial Supreme Court by President Theodore Roosevelt in 1901 and 1905, and by William Howard Taft in 1909. While serving as a territorial district court judge, he presided over two trials that received national publicity. In 1899, ranchers Oliver Lee and Jim Gilliland were charged with the murder of lawyer and Republican politician Albert J. Fountain and his son, three years after their disappearance. Sheriff Pat Garrett, famous for killing outlaw Billy the Kid, obtained the indictments. The ranchers were defended by Albert Bacon Fall, a Democratic rival of Fountain's, who obtained an acquittal; Fountain's murder was never solved. In 1909, Parker presided over the trial of Jesse Wayne Brazel, this time for the murder of Garrett. Fall again represented the defendant, and again obtained an acquittal.

Parker served as a member of New Mexico's constitutional convention and as chair of the committee on judiciary. New Mexico achieved statehood in 1912, and Parker was one of the first three justices elected to the Supreme Court. He continued to secure re-election, always running on the Republican ticket, and served on the court until his death in 1932. During his tenure, he served as chief justice from 1919 to 1920 and 1922 to 1928. He also served as chair of the state's boundary commission during a boundary dispute with Texas.

In 1923, the New Mexico State Tribune, a pro-Democratic newspaper, suggested that Parker had misused court funds. The paper's editor and publisher, Carl Magee, was subsequently tried and convicted of criminal libel.

Parker was married twice. He married Lillian L. Kinney on September 28, 1892; she died on August 11, 1893. They had one daughter, Rosamond Lillian. On October 26, 1904, he married Anna Davis, with whom he had a son, Frank Wilson, Jr. He was a freemason and a member of the Elks Lodge. Parker is buried at Fairview Cemetery in Santa Fe.

Political offices
Preceded by Newly established court	Justice of the New Mexico Supreme Court; 1912–1932	Succeeded by Tom W. Neal
