= Louis E. Saavedra =

American politician and educator

25th Mayor of Albuquerque
- In office December 1989 – November 1993
- Preceded by: Ken Schultz
- Succeeded by: Martin Chávez

Personal details
- Born: March 18, 1933 Socorro, New Mexico, U.S.
- Died: August 7, 2009 (aged 76) Albuquerque, New Mexico, U.S.
- Party: Democratic

Louis Emilio Saavedra (March 18, 1933 – August 7, 2009) was an American politician and educator who served as the 25th mayor of Albuquerque, New Mexico. A member of the Democratic Party, he served as mayor from December 1989 until November 1993.

== Early life and education ==
Born in Socorro, New Mexico, Saavedra attended Socorro High School. For post-secondary education, Saavedra received two degrees from Eastern New Mexico University.

== Career ==
He later went on to a career in education in Albuquerque, and eventually ran for and won mayorship of Albuquerque in 1989. Saavedra founded the Albuquerque Technical Vocational Institute in 1964, and was its president until he was elected mayor of Albuquerque.

== Death ==
On August 7, 2009, Saavedra died from brain cancer in Albuquerque.
