= New Mexico Attorney General =

Head of the New Mexico Department of Justice

Attorney General of New Mexico
- Seal of New Mexico

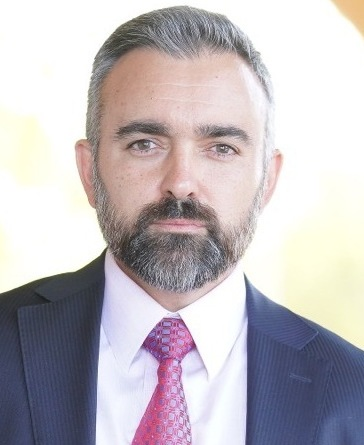
- Incumbent; Raúl Torrez since January 1, 2023
- Term length: Four years
- Formation: 1912
- First holder: Frank Willey Clancy
- Website: Attorney General of New Mexico

The attorney general of New Mexico, an elected executive officer of the state, oversees the New Mexico Attorney General's Office and serves as head of the New Mexico Department of Justice.

The officeholder, who is required to be a licensed attorney, is fifth in succession to the office of Governor of New Mexico, after the Lieutenant Governor of New Mexico, Secretary of State of New Mexico, President pro tempore of the New Mexico Senate and the Speaker of New Mexico House of Representatives.

The attorney general of New Mexico functions as the state's chief legal officer, legal counsel to state government, consumer advocate and guardian of the public interest.

== Statutory responsibilities ==
The officeholder represents the state before any courts or agencies when the public interest requires or when requested by the Governor and prosecutes and defends all causes in the New Mexico Supreme Court, New Mexico Court of Appeals, or any other court or tribunal in which the state is a party or is interested. The New Mexico Attorney General prosecutes and defends all actions and proceedings involving any state employee in their official capacity, as well as may represent residential or small business consumers before the New Mexico Public Regulation Commission.

Upon request, the AG will provide written legal opinions to the legislature, any state official, or any district attorney on any subject pending before one of these officials. In matters involving the state Election Code the AG provides legal assistance to the Secretary of State of New Mexico.

The AG drafts contracts, bonds, and other instruments as required for use by the state.

At the governor's direction, the AG may attend and assist in the trial of any indictment or information in any county of the state. When a District Attorney fails or refuses to act, the AG may act on behalf of a county in any criminal or civil case.

In matters of the impeachment of a state legislator or employee, the AG initiates conflict of interest enforcement actions. The AG also prosecutes removal proceedings against district attorneys.

The AG establishes and maintains a register of all documents filed by charitable organizations and makes it available for public inspection.

== List of New Mexico Attorneys General ==
Parties

Democratic (29) Republican (3)

#	Image	Name	Took office	Left office	Party	Years in office
1		Frank W. Clancy	1912	1916	Republican	5 (Note: Since the first state election was in an odd-numbered year (1911), the term lasted five years.)
2		Harry L. Patton	1917	1918	Democratic	2
3		Oscar O. Askren	1919	1920	Democratic	2
4		Harry S. Bowman	1921	1922	Democratic	2
5		Milton J. Helmick	1923	1924	Democratic	2
6		John W. Armstrong	1925	1926	Democratic	<2 (Note: Died while in office)
7		Fred E. Wilson	1926	1926	Democratic	<1 (Note: Appointed by Governor Hannett in 1926)
8		Robert C. Dow	1927	1928	Democratic	2
9		Miguel A. Otero III	1929	1930	Republican	2
10		Ernest K. Neumann	1931	1934	Democratic	4
11		Frank H. Patton	1935	1938	Democratic	4
12		Filo Sedillo	1939	1940	Democratic	2
13		Edward P. Chase	1941	1944	Democratic	<4 (Note: Resigned in 1944.)
14		Clyde C. McCullough	1944	1948	Democratic	<5 (Note: Appointed by Governor Dempsey in 1944.)
15		Joe L. Martínez	1949	1952	Democratic	4
16		Richard H. Robinson	1953	1956	Democratic	4
17		Fred M. Standley	1957	1958	Democratic	2
18		Frank B. Zinn	1959	1959	Democratic	<1 (Note: Resigned in 1959.)
19		Hilton A. Dickson Jr.	1959	1960	Democratic	<2 (Note: Appointed by Governor Burroughs in 1959.)
20		Earl E. Hartley	1961	1964	Democratic	4
21		Boston E. Witt	1965	1968	Democratic	4
22		James A. Maloney	1969	1970	Democratic	2
23		David L. Norvell	1971	1974	Democratic	4
24		Toney Anaya	1975	1978	Democratic	4
25		Jeff Bingaman	1979	1982	Democratic	4
26		Paul G. Bardacke	1983	1986	Democratic	4
27		Harold Stratton	1987	1990	Republican	4
28		Tom Udall	1991	1998	Democratic	8
29		Patricia A. Madrid	1999	2006	Democratic	8
30		Gary King	2007	2014	Democratic	8
31		Hector Balderas	2015	2022	Democratic	8
32		Raúl Torrez	2023	Incumbent	Democratic	1
