= Frank Willey Clancy =

American mayor (1852–1928)

Frank Willey Clancy (January 15, 1852 – September 1, 1928) was attorney general of New Mexico (1909–1916), as well as Mayor of Albuquerque (1898).

== Life ==
Clancy was born on January 15, 1852 in Dover, New Hampshire, the son of Michael Albert Clancy and Lydia Ardilla Willey, and brother of Harry Smith Clancy.

In 1873 he graduated with a LL. B from the law school at Columbian University (now George Washington University) in Washington, DC. He moved to Albuquerque, New Mexico, in 1874, and was admitted to the bar in New Mexico. From 1875-1876 he was the Clerk of District court Second District in Albuquerque. In 1877, he moved east for two years, and became the Secretary to the Assistant Secretary of Treasury, R.C. McCormick, remaining as McCormick's secretary when he appointed as U.S. Commissioner-General to the Paris Exposition.

In 1879 he moved to Santa Fe, New Mexico, where he married Charlotte Jane Cawthorne Swallow on October 30, 1879. She was the daughter of Reverend Benjamin Swallow, and was born in London, England. From 1879 to 1883 he was the Clerk of the District and Supreme Courts in New Mexico. In 1889 he became a member of the New Mexico Constitutional Convention, and in 1891 became President of the New Mexico Bar Association. In 1892 he left Santa Fe and returned to Albuquerque. The same year he became a Regent at the University of New Mexico, a post he would hold until 1909.

In 1896 he was a practising attorney, living at 314 North 6th Street. From April 1898 to April 1899, he served as mayor of Albuquerque. In 1901 he became district attorney for Bernalillo County, and remained in this post 1909. In 1906 he was a delegate to the New Mexico Constitutional Convention. From 1909 to 1916 he was Attorney General of New Mexico, living at 911 W. Copper.

In 1912 Governor William McDonald requested Clancy to determine the boundary between New Mexico and Texas. He also acted as Special Counsel for New Mexico in suits against Colorado and Texas. From 1913 to 1914 he was the president of the Territorial Board of Equalization, living again in Santa Fe. From 1923 to 1924, he was the president of the New Mexico Historical Society.

He died on September 1, 1928, at his home in Santa Fe.

== See also ==
- Frank Bourg
