= Charles E. Barnhart =

American politician

Charles Barnhart

Member of the Albuquerque City Commission
- In office 1967–1971

Personal details
- Born: January 9, 1922 Santa Rosa, New Mexico, U.S.
- Died: June 28, 2007 (aged 85) Albuquerque, New Mexico, U.S.
- Education: University of New Mexico (BS, JD)

Military service
- Branch/service: United States Navy
- Battles/wars: World War II

Charles E. Barnhart (January 9, 1922 – June 28, 2007) was an American attorney, politician, and engineer who served as the ex-officio mayor of Albuquerque from 1970 to 1971 and as a member of the Albuquerque City Commission from 1967 to 1971.

== Early life and education ==
Barnhart was born and raised in Santa Rosa, New Mexico, where he attended the Santa Rosa Public High School. He earned a Bachelor of Science degree in engineering from the University of New Mexico in 1944 and a Juris Doctor from the University of New Mexico School of Law.

== Career ==
During World War II, Barnhart was commissioned as an ensign in the United States Navy and served aboard the USS Waupaca. After the war, Barnhart worked as an engineer in Albuquerque and Los Alamos, New Mexico. After graduating from law school in 1959, he worked as an attorney in Albuquerque for several years. Barnhart was also the developer of the Van Cleave Mobile home park, a planned community for seniors.

Barnhart served as a member of the Albuquerque City Commission from 1967 to 1971 and chairman of the commission in 1970 to 1971, a rank equivalent to mayor.

== Death ==
Barnhart died in Albuquerque in 2007. He was 85.
