= Richard J. Berry =

American entrepreneur and politician

Richard Berry
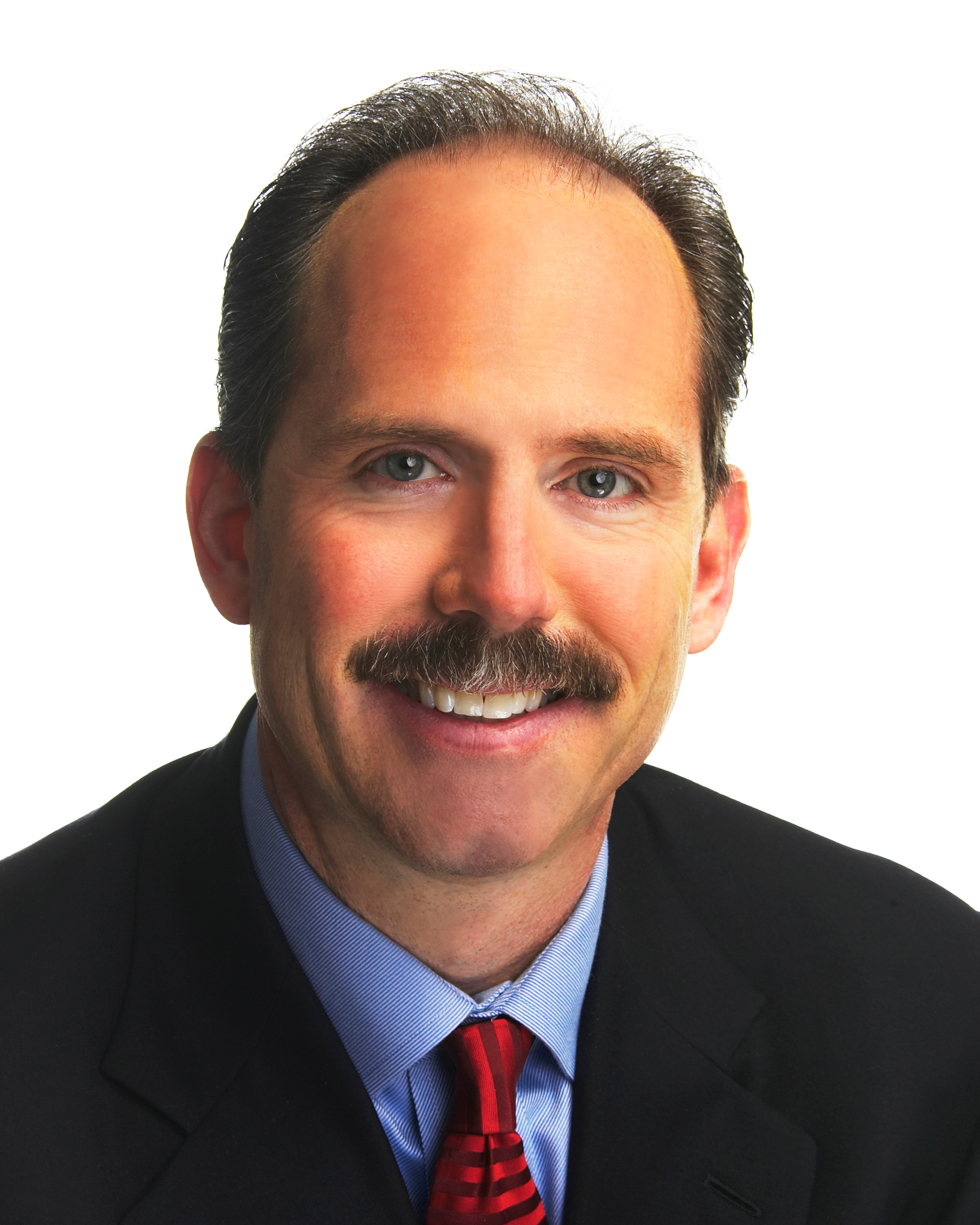

29th Mayor of Albuquerque
- In office December 1, 2009 – December 1, 2017
- Preceded by: Martin Chávez
- Succeeded by: Tim Keller

Member of the New Mexico House of Representatives from the 20th district
- In office January 3, 2007 – December 1, 2009
- Preceded by: Ted Hobbs
- Succeeded by: James White

Personal details
- Born: Richard James Berry; November 5, 1962 (age 63) Waterloo, Iowa, U.S.
- Party: Republican
- Spouse: Maria Medina
- Children: 1
- Education: University of New Mexico, Albuquerque (BBA)

Richard James Berry (born November 5, 1962) is an American entrepreneur and politician who served as the 29th mayor of Albuquerque, New Mexico, He is also a former two term member of the New Mexico House of Representatives, and is a member of the Republican Party, as of 2025, is the last Republican Mayor of Albuquerque.

Berry was sworn into office on December 1, 2009, following his victory over incumbent Democrat Martin Chávez, Berry became the first Republican Mayor of Albuquerque in nearly 30 years.

== Early life, education, and business career ==
Richard Berry was born in Waterloo, Iowa on November 5, 1962. He was raised in Nebraska and graduated from Beatrice Senior High School in Beatrice, Nebraska in 1981, Berry moved to Albuquerque in 1982 to attend the University of New Mexico on academic and athletic scholarships (track & field, decathlon). While at the Anderson School of Management, he met his future wife, Maria Medina. Berry graduated with a Bachelor of Business Administration in 1985.

After graduating, he became an entrepreneur in the construction industry.

== New Mexico House of Representatives ==
=== Elections ===
In 2006, Berry ran for the 20th district of the New Mexico House of Representatives after Republican State Representative Ted Hobbs decided to retire. He won the June 6 Republican primary with 52% of the vote, defeating two other candidates and won the general election, In 2008, he won re-election to a second term.

=== Tenure ===
Berry was a member of the pension solvency task-force.

=== Committee assignments ===
- Appropriations and Finance
- Rules
- Rural and Economic Development
- Transportation and Public Works

== Mayor of Albuquerque ==
=== Elections ===
In 2009, Berry decided to run for Mayor of Albuquerque. He won the election with 44% of the popular vote. He defeated two Democrats: incumbent Mayor Martin Chávez (35%) and State Senator Richard Romero (21%).

Berry ran for re-election to a second term in 2013 and won with 69% of the vote, defeating Democrat Pete Dinelli and Republican Paul Heh.

=== National leadership ===
Berry served as the Chairman of the US Conference of Mayors Metro Economies Committee, as well as an elected member of the Advisory Board. In addition, he served as the Chairman of the Community Leaders of America (CLA) from 2013–2015.

=== Budgets ===
As Mayor, Berry reduced government spending by over $140 million, while keeping services to the community intact and without layoffs. In addition, Berry reduced the size of city government by over 300 positions, through attrition and vacancies. This attrition was made up partially by the 8% reduction in the city's police force during which time the city experienced a spike in violent crimes. Without raising taxes, he increased the city's operating reserve percentage.

Berry initiated an "Efficiency, Stewardship, and Accountability" program that encourages city employees to report areas of inefficiency or waste in resources, offering a cash incentive to employees to encourage participation. By 2015, the program had saved over $20 million.

Other innovations included switching to one provider for insurance, saving of more than $4 million. The city has maintained its "AAA" S&P bond rating.

=== Education ===
One of Berry's core focus areas was augmenting the existing educational system by starting a program called Running Start for Careers, a nationally recognized apprenticeship and education program. This public-private partnership allows high school students to enroll in a semester-long, dual-credit career exploration class held at industry sites for work-and-learn programs. Participants have higher graduation rates, and the program has served over 1000 local students and the program has maintained a 98% graduation rate. Running Start for Careers was named one of the Top 25 "Innovations in Government" by the Harvard Ash Center in May 2015.

Berry also committed $100,000 a year to fund six "Homework Diner" locations. Homework Diner is a grassroots, community-led program that provides after-school tutoring and meal assistance to families. The program addresses two common barriers to education – hunger and lack of parental involvement. Homework Diner provides free nutritious meals prepared by culinary students from the Central New Mexico Community College (CNM), and educators stay late to tutor children and help them with their homework. It brings families together around a table with a meal and involves parents in helping their children with their academics. The program's inter-generational approach also includes GED courses for parents who attend.

Berry announced that the city will provide approximately $115,000 for an International Baccalaureate (IB) program at Sandia High School, the first program of its kind in the local public school district. The IB diploma program is a world-recognized college prep program for juniors and seniors based on rigorous academic standards. Qualified students from across Albuquerque will be encouraged to participate. APS expects IB to be offered to a junior class of 100-150 students beginning with the 2013-2014 school year. Sandia High School, as of the 2025-2026 school year, offers over a dozen IB classes.

Another initiative Berry put into action is TalentABQ, which helped people gain the certifications they needed to show prospective employers that they had the skills to do the job and improve productivity in their businesses. The program tested people for free at 35 locations around the City of Albuquerque. Within two years of 2017, 14,000 people had decided to be tested to see what job they would be best at, and nearly 42,000 assessments had been taken. The city had also been working with 250 businesses to go into skills based hiring. In 2018, TalentABQ's contract was not renewed, the initiative's website expired and the program is defunct.

=== Social initiatives ===
In 2011, Berry launched a homelessness aid initiative called Albuquerque Heading Home. Heading Home had existed in some form since 2004, through its men’s shelter at the Albuquerque Opportunity Center. This program provides chronically homeless, medically vulnerable individuals with housing through partnerships with local service providers. Since 2011, 646 individuals and families have been housed through the program. A study by the University of New Mexico found that it was 31% more cost-effective to house chronically homeless, medically-vulnerable individuals through the program than to let them remain on the streets.

In August 2013, Berry announced a pay equity taskforce to address gender-based wage and salary inequality. As a result of task force recommendations, in May 2015 the City Council passed a bill supported by Berry that gave incentives to companies bidding for city contracts that can prove that they pay women within 10% of what they pay men in comparable jobs.

In 2015, Berry launched the There's A Better Way campaign. The initiative helps to eradicate homelessness in the Albuquerque area. With the help of St. Martin's Hospitality Center, a van goes out in the morning picks up panhandlers and homeless people. They pay the individuals $9 an hour, give them lunch, and then at the end of the day go back to St. Martin's and get invited to engage into programs that may help them to end their homelessness. To date, about 1,200 day jobs have been provided and over 180 people have been connected with some kind of permanent employment opportunities. Through the program about 100,000 pounds of trash and weeds have been cleaned up from about 310 city blocks.

=== Capital improvements ===
Berry's administration completed the $93 million Paseo del Norte and I-25 interchange improvement project. This critical project is shortening commute times for over 56 million drivers a year and is estimated to bring nearly $3 billion in economic opportunity to Albuquerque in the coming decades.

=== Transparency ===
A leader in government transparency, Berry also launched ABQ-View. It allows citizens to easily access city spending data, employee salaries, vendor contracts, capital projects, audits, internal investigations, budget trending, travel expenses, and political contributions. This led to the City of Albuquerque to receive an A+ rating from the Sunshine Review for transparency in both 2011 and 2012.

To encourage city employees to cut spending and waste, Berry created the Efficiency, Stewardship and Accountability Award. This program allows employees to submit ideas for saving the city money in their own departments. If the idea results in actual savings, the employee's department is eligible for an efficiency bonus. The citizens of Albuquerque have saved over $1.4 million, much of it recurring. A recent ESA example involved identifying annual savings on cell phones of $344,000.

=== Recognitions ===
Under Mayor Berry, Albuquerque:

- Bloomberg Businessweek's latest ranking has Albuquerque topping major cities like Boston and Los Angeles. The ranking recognized Albuquerque's scenery and its stable economy, recreational opportunities, and quality educational system.
- Albuquerque received high marks from Business Facilities magazine's annual ranking of metro areas' economic strengths. Albuquerque was the 2nd-highest-rated area in terms of both economic growth potential and alternative energy industry leaders, 3rd for motion picture industry growth, and the 5th-highest-ranked metro area for quality of life.
- MovieMaker magazine ranks Albuquerque the #1 city to live, work, and make movies in their January 2010 issue.
- Relocate America ranked Albuquerque among the Top 10 Recovery Cities – May 2010 issue.
- Forbes ranked Albuquerque among the best retirement places in its March 2011 issue.
- The Brookings Institution ranked Albuquerque's exports 20th in the US in its July 2010 issue.
- Brookings Institution also ranked Albuquerque #7 for increase in gross metro product, in its April 2010 issue.
- William F. Dixon Award for Open Government, the Foundation for Open Government, 2012.
- City of Albuquerque received an A+ rating from the Sunshine Review for transparency in both 2011 and 2012.

=== Public safety ===
Berry's office claims that by stepping up community policing efforts in conjunction with smart policing technology Albuquerque has seen its crime rate drop to the lowest the city has seen in 20 years. Homicide totals, robberies, burglaries, auto theft, and property crime are all down since Berry took office, according to 2012 statistics from the Albuquerque Police Department. However, media reports contradict some of these statements, with some reports showing an overall rise in violent crime and property crime from 2010 onwards, 2014 ranking as the most violent year for the last five years.

Berry and then-Police Chief Raymond Schultz launched a new initiative in 2012 aimed to get more recruits into the police academy. "We are looking for the best and brightest," Berry said; "We believe these new incentives will attract some of the best law enforcement recruits in our region." The advertising campaign was called, "My Mommy and Daddy Are Heroes". However, those recruiting efforts have largely been unsuccessful. APD continues to suffer from a significant shortage of new officers and difficulty attracting qualified recruits, as of 2015. Berry has defended APD in several shootings, causing many protests in the city. Berry's platform for police reform and the department's lack of transparency have been met with national scrutiny and criticism.

=== 2014 report on the Albuquerque Police Department ===
Despite the Albuquerque Police Department's focus on the drop in crime rates, a 2014 Justice Department investigation into APD's practices resulted in a report citing numerous violations of individuals' constitutional rights and finding that the "department engages in a pattern or practice of using excessive force during the course of arrests and other detentions in violation of the Fourth Amendment and Section 14141."

The DOJ report includes specific examples of excessive and unnecessary use of force, from a random sample of 200 force reports during Mayor Berry's term between 2009–2013 and includes recommendations for revising department policies and practices The report was submitted to Mayor Berry, APD Chief Gordon Eden, and Albuquerque City Attorney David Tourek on April 10, 2014.

The report also notes that "Albuquerque police officers also often use less-lethal force in an unconstitutional manner" and that "The use of excessive force by APD officers is not isolated or sporadic. The pattern or practice of excessive force stems from systemic deficiencies in oversight, training, and policy. Chief among these deficiencies is the department's failure to implement an objective and rigorous internal accountability system. Force incidents are not properly investigated, documented, or addressed with corrective measures."

As of May 2015, more than a year after the DOJ report, APD's website does not outline any specific policy changes, or otherwise respond to the report, although it does provide a link.

== Personal life ==
Berry is an Eagle Scout, participating with his son who is also an Eagle Scout. Berry received the Silver Beaver Award from the Boy Scouts of America for his work as a Scout leader who has made an impact on the lives of youth through service given to the council.

He enjoys outdoor activities with his family including, hunting and fishing, snowboarding, water skiing, and other outdoor sports. Berry lettered in track & field while at the University of New Mexico. He participates in community and philanthropic events. He is a Roman Catholic.

== See also ==
- List of mayors of Albuquerque
- List of mayors of the largest 50 US cities

New Mexico House of Representatives
Preceded by Ted Hobbs	Member of the New Mexico House of Representatives from the 20th district 2007–2009	Succeeded by James White
Political offices
Preceded by Martin Chávez	Mayor of Albuquerque; 2009–2017	Succeeded by Tim Keller
