= Frank Clancy (sheriff) =

American sheriff and alleged Mafia associate

Frank Clancy (September 6, 1892 – December 22, 1960) was a sheriff and alleged American Mafia associate.

An old time political boss, Clancy had recently appeared before the Kefauver Committee and had testified that he had allowed organized crime figures to place 5,000 slot machines in his parish. It was also claimed he had earned a percentage of gambling casinos operated by acting New Orleans crime family boss Carlos Marcello, in which he maintained the right to hire employees below management position. Although Clancy's testimony did implicate Marcelo, it had relatively little impact on his gambling operations.

Clancy had apparently been talking to federal authorities regarding gambling operations in Louisiana but following an attempt on his life he soon stopped cooperating with authorities.

== Attempt on life and mistaken victim ==
Frank Bourg (1890–1955) was a New Orleans bank teller and an apparently mistaken victim of a failed contract murder on a mafia associate Sheriff Frank Clancy.

A longtime New Orleans resident, Frank Bourg had been hospitalized following a heart attack in April 1955 when an unidentified assailant, possibly posing as a visitor, entered his room and smashed the skull of the 64-year-old bank teller as he slept. Although evidence pointed to a gangland slaying, police could find no evidence of criminal associations in connection other than his nearly 30 years as a local bank teller.

However, it was later theorized that Bourg had been mistaken for Sheriff Frank Clancy, who occupied the next room as a police report stated "...from the time Clancy...entered the hospital, he...had a guard outside of his door but the guard was removed-on the morning of the attack-by someone representing themselves as the sheriff's wife."

Although the gangland slayings of innocent victims usually bring considerable unwanted attention and pressure from law enforcement, Marcello's organization suffered little retaliation from local authorities. While a nurse's aid gave a description of a suspect, she recanted her testimony three days later.

Clancy stopped cooperating with authorities after Bourg's murder.
