= Martin Chávez =

American politician (born 1952)

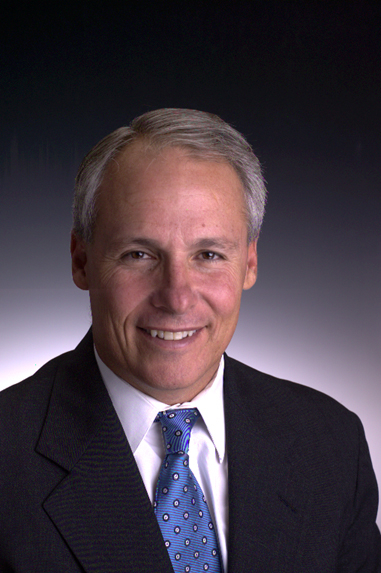

26th and 28th Mayor of Albuquerque
- In office December 1, 2001 – December 1, 2009
- Preceded by: Jim Baca
- Succeeded by: Richard J. Berry
- In office December 1, 1993 – December 1, 1997
- Preceded by: Louis Saavedra
- Succeeded by: Jim Baca

Member of the New Mexico Senate
- In office 1987–1993

Personal details
- Born: Martin Joseph Chávez; March 2, 1952 (age 74) Albuquerque, New Mexico, US
- Party: Democratic
- Children: 2
- Education: University of New Mexico (BA); Georgetown University (JD)

Martin Joseph "Marty" Chávez (born March 2, 1952) is an American politician, businessman, and attorney who served as a member of the New Mexico Senate from 1987 to 1993 and as the 26th and 28th mayor of Albuquerque, New Mexico. He served as the Executive Director of ICLEI Local Governments for Sustainability USA. and Chairman of the Advisory Board for the Center for Green Schools at U.S. Green Building Council. In 2012, he unsuccessfully sought the Democratic nomination for the Congressional seat being vacated by Martin Heinrich, who retired from the House to run for Senate.

He was a senior advisor to Ready for Hillary, an unaffiliated Super PAC supporting of a Hillary Clinton presidential candidacy prior to her announcement. He was a member of the national finance committee of the Hillary Clinton 2016 presidential campaign.

== Early life and education ==
He was born in 1952 in Albuquerque, New Mexico to a family of Hispanic heritage. Chávez attended both Catholic and public secondary schools. After graduating from Manzano High School, Chávez earned a Bachelor of Arts degree in university studies from the University of New Mexico and a Juris Doctor from Georgetown University Law Center.

== Career ==
He was the founding director of the New Mexico Workers' Compensation Administration in 1986.

=== New Mexico Senate ===
From 1987 to 1993, he served in the New Mexico Senate, where he helped pass the New Mexico Workers Compensation Act and to implement the Voter Registration Reform Act, known as "motor voter".

=== First mayoral term ===
==== 1993 election ====
He pulled a major upset by defeating former Governor David Cargo in the 1993 election for Mayor of Albuquerque 50.4%-49.6%, a difference of just 596 votes.

=== 1998 gubernatorial election ===
In 1997, Chávez opted not to run for re-election as mayor and instead ran for Governor of New Mexico in 1998. He won the six-candidate Democratic primary with 48% of the vote and won most of the counties in the state. He defeated very experienced candidates like State Representative Gary King, former Governor Jerry Apodaca, and State Auditor Robert Vigil. In the general election he was defeated by incumbent Republican governor Gary Johnson 55%-45%.

=== Second mayoral term ===
==== 2001 election ====
In 2001, Chávez again ran for Mayor of Albuquerque and finished first in a seven-candidate race.

==== 2005 re-election bid ====
In 2005, he was the first mayor to be re-elected for two consecutive terms since the creation of the strong mayoral form of government in 1974

=== Tenure ===
As Mayor, Chávez partnered with the University of New Mexico, Sandia National Laboratories and leading entrepreneurs and educators to establish the Albuquerque Institute of Math and Science (AIMS), a charter high school dedicated to academic excellence. In 2009, the AIMS graduated its first senior class of 26 students. For the first time in New Mexico's history, an entire graduating class had enrolled in college.

=== Recognitions ===
During his tenure as Mayor, Chávez and the City of Albuquerque received the following recognitions:

- Top Ten Places to Live In the US, U.S. News & World Report (2009);
- "Cool" Mayor Award, Mayors for Climate Protection –cited as "The Visionary" for sustainable water vision, urban forestry program and climate change initiatives, ICLEI (2009);
- EPA Climate Protection Award, 1st Place, US Environmental Protection Agency (2008);
- U.S. Chamber of Commerce and Siemens Sustainable Community Award (2008);
- Fittest City in America, Men's Fitness Magazine (2008);
- Renewable Energy Innovator of the Year Award, Association of Energy Engineers (2008);
- Best Cities for Jobs or a Career, Forbes Magazine (2007);
- Climate Protection Award, 1st Place, United States Conference of Mayors (2007);
- Most Pet Friendly City, 3rd Place, Forbes Magazine (2007);
- World Leadership Award for Water Utilities Conservation, World Leadership Forum, London, (2006)
- Number-one Place to do Business, Forbes Magazine (2006);
- Mayor of Trees Award, National Alliance for Community Trees (2004);
- William F. Dixon Award for Open Government, the Foundation for Open Government (2004);

==== 2008 U.S. Senate election ====
On October 8, 2007, Chávez announced his candidacy for the U.S. Senate seat that was being vacated by retiring Republican Senator Pete Domenici. Democratic leaders, including Senator Charles Schumer, Chairman of Democratic Senatorial Campaign Committee, recruited Tom Udall into the race.

Chávez indicated that he intended to remain in the race, referring to Udall as Washington's "fair-haired boy". However, Chavez withdrew from the race on December 7 saying, "While I deeply appreciate all the support I have received, it has become very clear to me that Democrats should not be divided in the upcoming election. "

==== 2009 re-election bid ====
In 2009, Chávez succeeded in overturning a two-consecutive mayoral term limit, which he had gotten passed into law, and announced he would seek a third consecutive, and fourth overall, term as mayor. He ran against Republican State Representative Richard J. Berry and Democratic State Senator Richard Romero in a hotly contested race. Romero split the Democratic vote, and Richard J. Berry defeated Chavez 44% to 35% while Romero finished a distant third with 21%.

=== Post-mayoral career ===
==== ICLEI ====
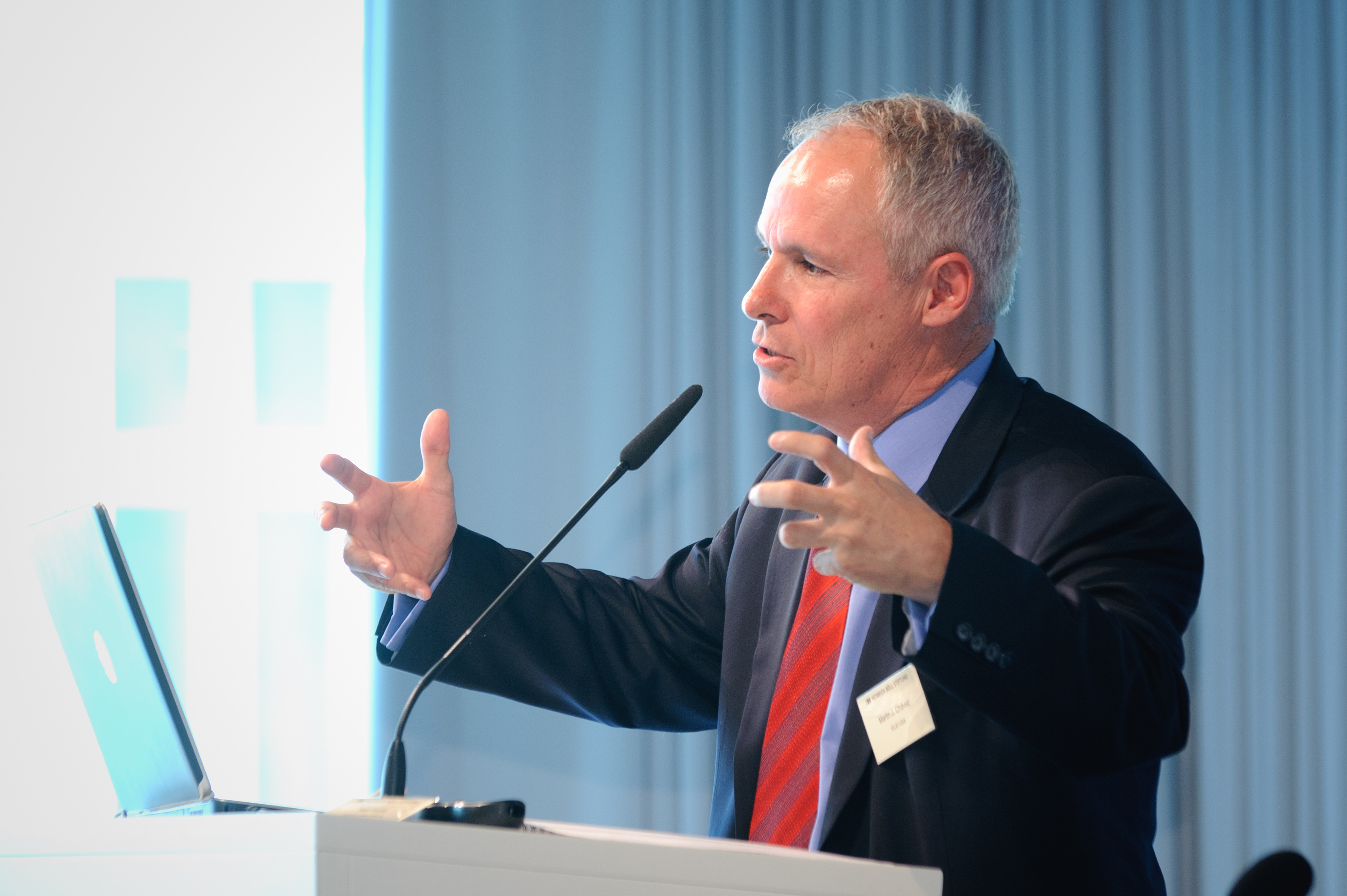
Chávez speaking in 2011

In March 2010, Chávez, was appointed Executive Director of ICLEI Local Governments for Sustainability USA. Chávez had served on ICLEI USA's Board of Directors and was recognized nationally as a "green mayor" during his tenure in Albuquerque. Chavez leads a staff of 52 ICLEI USA employees, based in six regional offices: Boston, Atlanta, Chicago, Houston, Oakland, and Seattle. In addition to these responsibilities Chávez also speaks at many conferences including George Mason University's Washington Youth Summit on the Environment in 2011.

==== Memberships ====
Chavez serves on the Board of the Mexican American Legal Defense and Educational Fund (MALDEF). Chávez is a member of the National Building Museum's Intelligent Cities Advisory Committee and member of the U.S. Department of Agriculture's Vibrant Cities and Urban Forests Task Force. In March 2011, Chávez joined polar explorer and environmentalist Robert Swan, on an expedition to explore the effects of climate change in the Antarctica.

==== 2012 congressional election ====
Chávez sought the Democratic nomination to succeed Martin Heinrich in the U.S. House, but lost to Bernalillo County Commissioner Michelle Lujan Grisham.

=== Current Memberships ===
Martin Chavez was named to a two-year term on the board of directors of the Mexican American Legal Defense and Educational Fund (MALDEF) in May 2013. He also on the board of directors of American Rivers. He is a former senior adviser to the Hispanic Technology and Telecommunications Partnership (HTTP), He is currently a senior adviser to Smart City Media, an Internet of Things company that merges interactive smart signs with mobile applications to deliver location-based media in real time, and to P3GM, a Smart Cities technology startup focusing on public-private partnerships in the smart cities arena. He is also a member of the board of directors of the Center for National Policy/Truman Security Project.

Political offices
Preceded by Louis Saavedra	Mayor of Albuquerque; 1993–1997	Succeeded by Jim Baca
Preceded by Jim Baca	Mayor of Albuquerque; 2001–2009	Succeeded by Richard Berry
Party political offices
Preceded by Bruce King	Democratic nominee for Governor of New Mexico; 1998	Succeeded by Bill Richardson
