= Gertrude Lee =

Diné lawyer and politician

Chief Prosecutor of the Navajo Nation
- In office November 2016 – before September 2020
- Appointed by: Ethel Branch
- Preceded by: Jaime High (acting)

Personal details
- Born: Kirtland, New Mexico, U.S.
- Citizenship: Navajo Nation; United States
- Party: Republican
- Education: Creighton University; University of New Mexico

Gertrude Lee is a Diné lawyer and politician who was appointed chief prosecutor of the Navajo Nation in 2016. By 2020, she was a senior trial attorney for the San Juan County district attorney's office.

== Early life and education ==
Lee was born and raised in Kirtland, New Mexico and is an enrolled member of the Navajo Nation. She graduated from Kirtland Central High School in 2002. She completed a B.A. in political science from Creighton University. Lee was influenced to pursue a legal career by her father, Calvin F. Lee, and her older brother, Calvin Lee Jr., who is also a lawyer. Lee attended the University of New Mexico School of Law, where she earned a J.D. in 2009.

== Career ==
Lee is a licensed attorney in the state of New Mexico and a member of both the New Mexico Bar Association and the Navajo Nation Bar Association. She began her legal career working for six and a half years with the 11th Judicial District Attorney's Office, Division 2, in Gallup, New Mexico. Starting as an associate trial attorney, she advanced to the position of deputy district attorney. While with the district attorney's office she prosecuted criminal cases. She gained experience in a murder case under the mentorship of McKinley County district attorney Karl Gillson.

In November 2016, at the age of 32, Lee was appointed as the chief prosecutor for the Navajo Nation by attorney general Ethel Branch. She was sworn in by Window Rock district court judge Geraldine Benally. As chief prosecutor, Lee became responsible for overseeing a staff of 35 employees across nine district offices throughout the Navajo Nation. Her role included prosecuting individuals who violated the laws of the Navajo Nation Code and managing the tribe’s prosecutorial resources. Lee succeeded Bernadine Martin, who had vacated the position 16 months prior. During the interim period, deputy chief prosecutor Jaime High had served as acting chief prosecutor. In November 2016, Lee outlined a strategy to recruit professionals to fill key positions and enhance the capacity of the Navajo Nation's justice system to handle its caseload.

By September 2020, Lee was serving as a senior trial attorney for the San Juan County district attorney's office. Lee announced her candidacy for the New Mexico Court of Appeals during the 2020 elections, running as a Republican. Her campaign platform focused her perspective as a Navajo trial attorney from rural New Mexico. She was a candidate for position 2 on the court of appeals for the role in 2022. Her candidacy was endorsed by the Albuquerque Police Officers' Association.

== Electoral history ==
Judge Shammara Henderson ran for a term ending in 2024 after being appointed by Governor Michelle Lujan Grisham on February 14, 2020.

2020 New Mexico Court of Appeals election (Position 2)
Party	Candidate	Votes	%
Democratic	Shammara Henderson (incumbent)	450,566	50.97%
Republican	Gertrude Lee	370,778	41.95%
Libertarian	Stephen Curtis	62,547	7.08%
Total votes		883,891	100.0%
Democratic hold			

Incumbent Judge Katherine Anne Wray was appointed on September 23, 2021, to a vacancy caused by the elevation of Judge Briana Zamora to the Supreme Court. Judge Wray ran for reelection to a full 8-year term.

2022 New Mexico Court of Appeals election (Position 2)
Party	Candidate	Votes	%
Democratic	Katherine Anne Wray (incumbent)	350,229	50.69%
Republican	Gertrude Lee	297,057	42.99%
Libertarian	Stephen P. Curtis	43,632	6.32%
Total votes		690,918	100.0%
Democratic hold			

== See also ==
- Native American women in politics
