= San Juan Episcopal Mission =

Branch of Episcopal Church in New Mexico, US

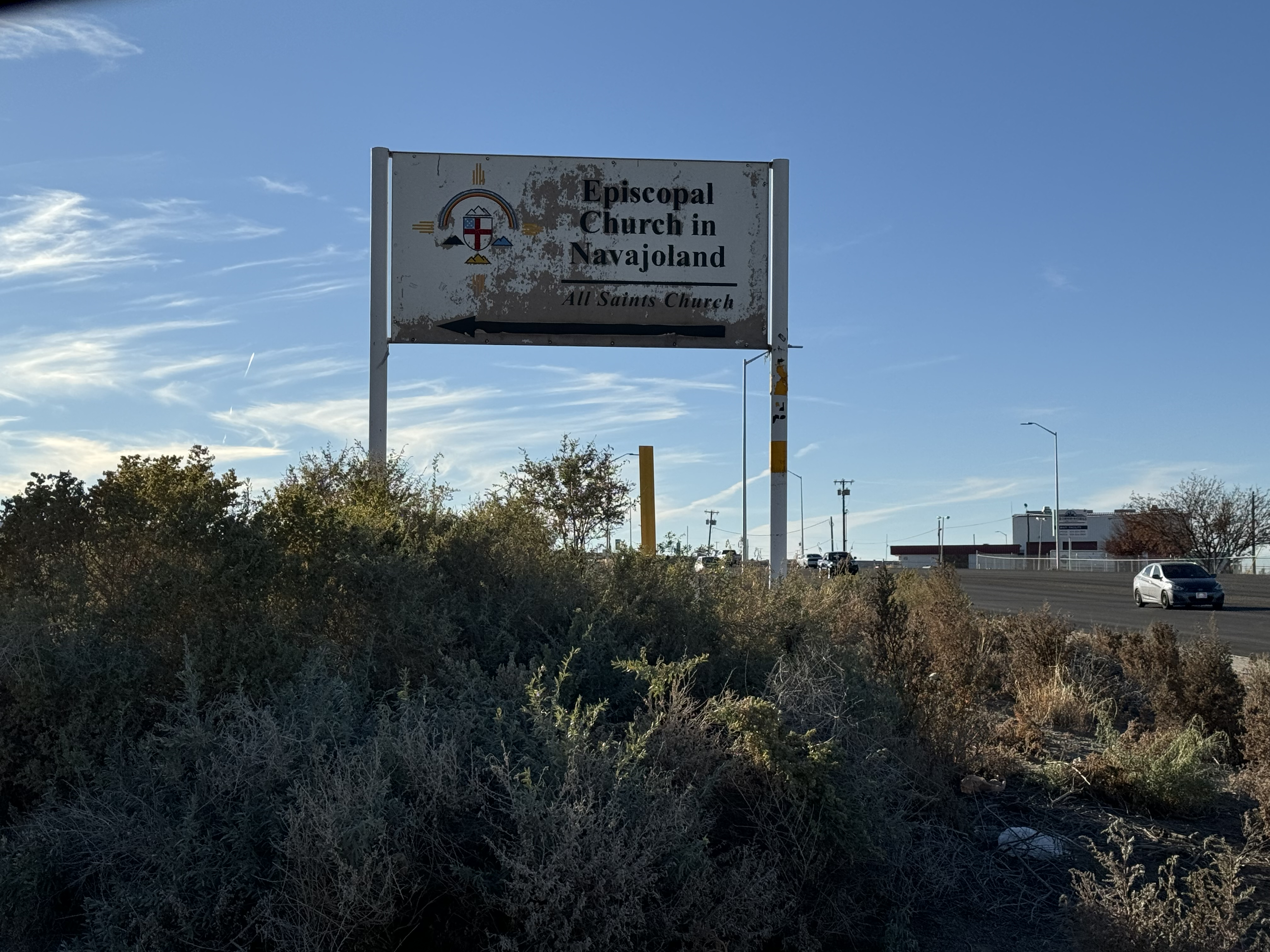
The entrance sign for the All Saint's Church in Farmington, NM. This was the original site of the San Juan Episcopal Mission.

The San Juan Episcopal Mission is a branch of the Episcopal Church in Navajoland Area Mission based in Farmington, New Mexico. Established in 1917, the mission serves sections of northwestern New Mexico, in particular the northern area of the Navajo Nation. What began as a small hospital and chapel functions today through three locations: All Saint's Episcopal Church in Farmington, St. Michael's Episcopal Church in Fruitland, and St. Luke's Episcopal Church in Bloomfield.

== Missionization in the United States ==
=== The Peace Commission and Peace Policy ===
In 1867, President Ulysses Grant created the Indian Peace Commission to address the origins of increased hostility between settlers and Native Americans. The committee called upon churches to redirect their attention homeward, as many had focused missionary efforts overseas. It was believed that with a special religious focus and effort, Native Americans could assimilate and become more like the white man. The success of the Peace Commission presented itself in the President's continued focus on Native American assimilation, and the development of the Peace Policy. This policy would place more Native Americans on reservations and provide agencies, schools, and religious resources for development.

An appendage of this policy was the creation of a Board of Indian Commissioners. President Grant's intentions were twofold: use the Board of Indian Commissioners to monitor agencies and agents, and support Christian missionary efforts among Native peoples. Many denominations were wary of a close church-state relationship but used increased government influence to support missionary expansion. The Methodist Episcopal Church alone more than doubled its missions, churches, missionaries, and members. This increased proximity participation between the federal government and Christian missionary efforts formally ended in 1882. Many denominations, including the Episcopalians, renewed their determination to evangelize.

=== Episcopal missionary work among the Navajo ===
Though the Episcopal Church had a presence in New Mexico and Arizona, local leaders began specific work on the Navajo Nation in the late 19th century. In 1889, Reverends T.L. Wiltsee, Thomas Harwood, and H.B. Antes embarked on a trip to determine the needs of the Navajo. Of this experience, Wiltsee wrote in his journal, "We came back more than ever convinced that here is a rare opportunity for our church to do missionary work among a most needy people...The Missionary Society that was born on an Indian reservation ought not to let a tribe of 20,000 Indians perish without the bread of life." Work began slowly, with the establishment of a base at Fort Defiance, Arizona. Here work was coordinated first by Wiltsee, under the direction of Bishop Kendrick. In addition to religious services, Kendrick enlisted the help of Eliza W. Thackara to provide medical services.

The following year, Reverend F.A. Riggin replaced Wiltsee, and the progress among the Navajos continued, as buildings for church and educational services were built nearby. Due to the vast, unfamiliar terrain and increasing demand for services, a branch of the Woman's Home Missionary Society established an outpost on the San Juan River, over a hundred miles north. Staffed by Mrs. Eldridge, the outpost provided medical services for a short time until the supporting Indian Right Association of Cambridge, Massachusetts could no longer continue its operation. In 1893, Reverend S.E. Snider assumed control of the work at Fort Defiance, and northward expansion was postponed until the early 20th century.

== History ==
=== Establishing a mission in San Juan County ===
In 1916, Bishop Frederick B Howden expressed his desire to connect further with the Native population by establishing a hospital or a school. With limited resources, Howden began his work in the same building abandoned by Mrs. Eldridge years before, located close to the San Juan River. Dedicated as "The San Juan Indian Mission," work began in early 1917 with medical aid from Miss Mattie C. Peters and a Navajo interpreter.

Limited resources and a vast area to serve made the work very difficult. The Navajo Nation is the largest reservation in the United States, encompassing almost 30,000 square miles of rugged terrain. Throughout 1918, the addition of Miss Olcott and Emily Ireland increased the mission's outreach. Both women worked diligently to help those in need in the furthermost rural parts of the reservation, especially during a devastating wave of influenza that year. The mission particularly benefited from the assistance of Dr. A.M. Smith, a resident of Farmington, NM. Much of the mission's original work focused on medical services, with a religious backing that became more prominent in the following years.

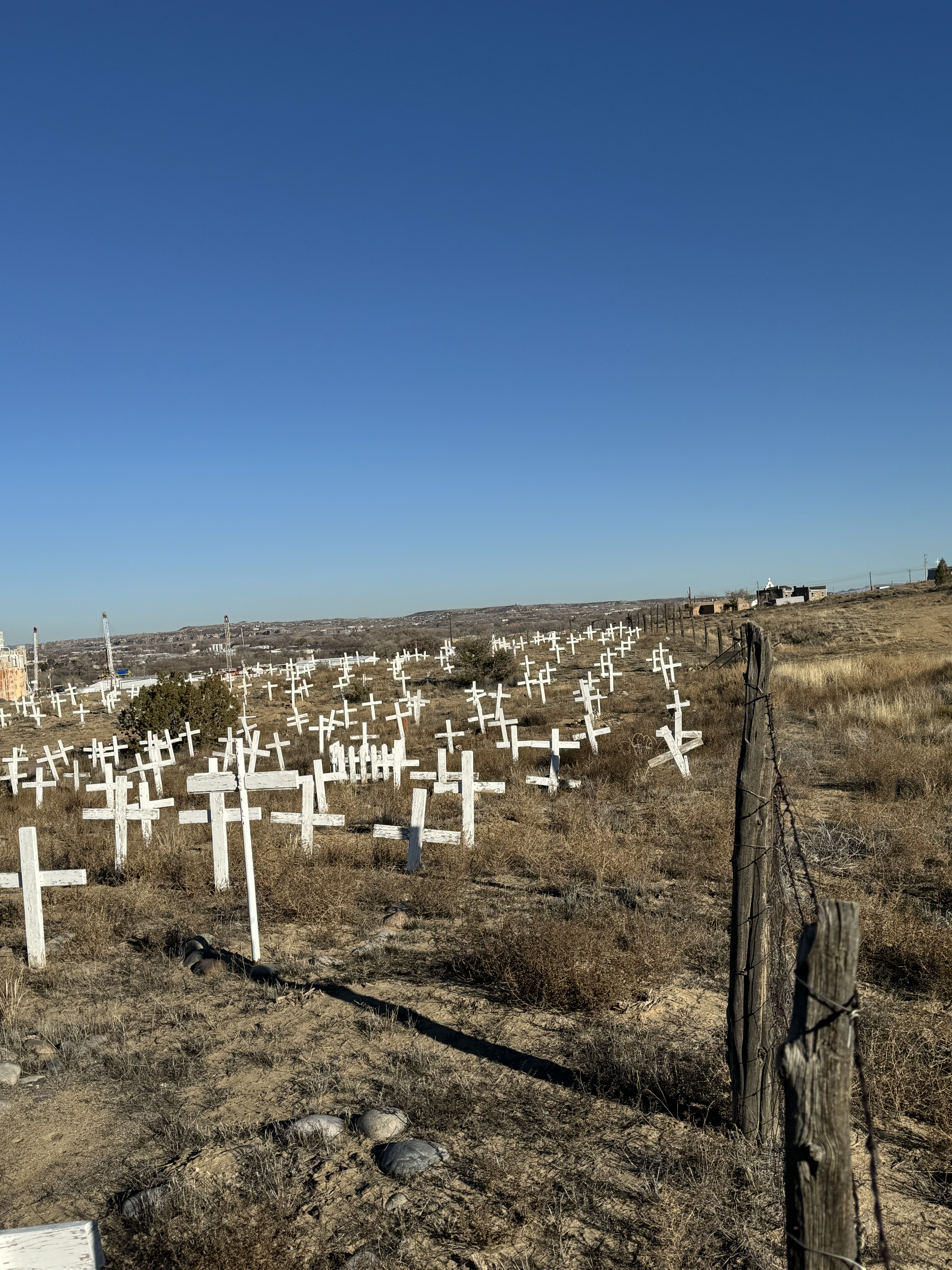
The mission has maintained a cemetery since its inception in the early 1920s

=== Activity during the mid-twentieth century ===
In 1920, a flood significantly damaged the original building. The new building—which opened in December 1923—included a hospital and a chapel. While maintaining this central location, Lena D. Wilcox was sent to Carson's Trading Post to provide services closer to the people in that area. Over the next twenty years the mission would expand twice more, once in 1930 with the construction of St. Luke's in the Desert in Bloomfield, NM, and again around 1952 in Fruitland, NM with the dedication of St. Michael's.

The superintendency of the mission changed hands multiple times and included Mr. Baker, Robert Y. Davis, Ralph H. Channon, F.J. Sedden, Eugene Botelho, David Clark, and Benjamin Ford. Each leader attempted to address the various needs of the Navajo during their incumbency, making strides in hospital development, spiritual outreach, and community development. By the mid-1950s, under the leadership of Eugene Botelho and with a heavily established presence in the San Juan community both on and off the reservation, the mission provided services in five particular areas: an Outpatient Clinic, Children's Center, Transient Center, Community Service, and the Episcopal Church Program.

== Healthcare on Native American reservations ==
=== Indian Health Service ===
The federal government first expressed interest in Native American health in 1832, making treaties with various tribes promising medical assistance. This type of treaty-making ended in 1871 and much of the promised care was fairly unreliable and inconsistent. The Bureau of Indian Affairs (BIA) standardized health care in the 1880s, to provide trained medical staff and quality resources to reservations. Unfortunately, due to a multitude of factors, including mediocre facilities and the remote nature of most reservations, most Native Americans did not receive proper care. By 1900 there were only five operating hospitals in the country, with less than 150 staff members.

In the early 20th century, the Indian Health Service underwent a dramatic revitalization, motivated primarily by the passage of the Indian Citizenship Act, also known as the Snyder Act. Not only did this act legitimize citizenship for Native Americans, but also gave the government responsibility for their welfare, including healthcare. Government leaders were further encouraged by the exposition of Native American life outlined in the Meriam Report of 1928. The report blamed the government for rampant health concerns on reservations. Over the next twenty years, under the direction of the BIA, the Indian Health Service attempted to address health concerns and improve life on reservations. One such attempt was the closure of many reservation hospitals in favor of contracts with local hospitals in nearby towns. While this simplified the work of the BIA, many Native Americans had concerns about losing these hospitals. In a time when the necessity of reservations was in question, closing hospitals appeared to be another step towards assimilation.

In 1954 the Indian Health Service transferred out of the jurisdiction of the BIA into the United States Public Health Service, an act that helped further organize healthcare efforts. Up until this point healthcare was largely regulated by government agencies and Native American autonomy did not become a greater priority until the 1970s. The passage of the 1975 Indian Self-Determination Act and the 1976 Indian Health Care Improvement Act gave tribal leaders a larger role in determining the available resources for their people.

=== Hospital at San Juan Mission ===
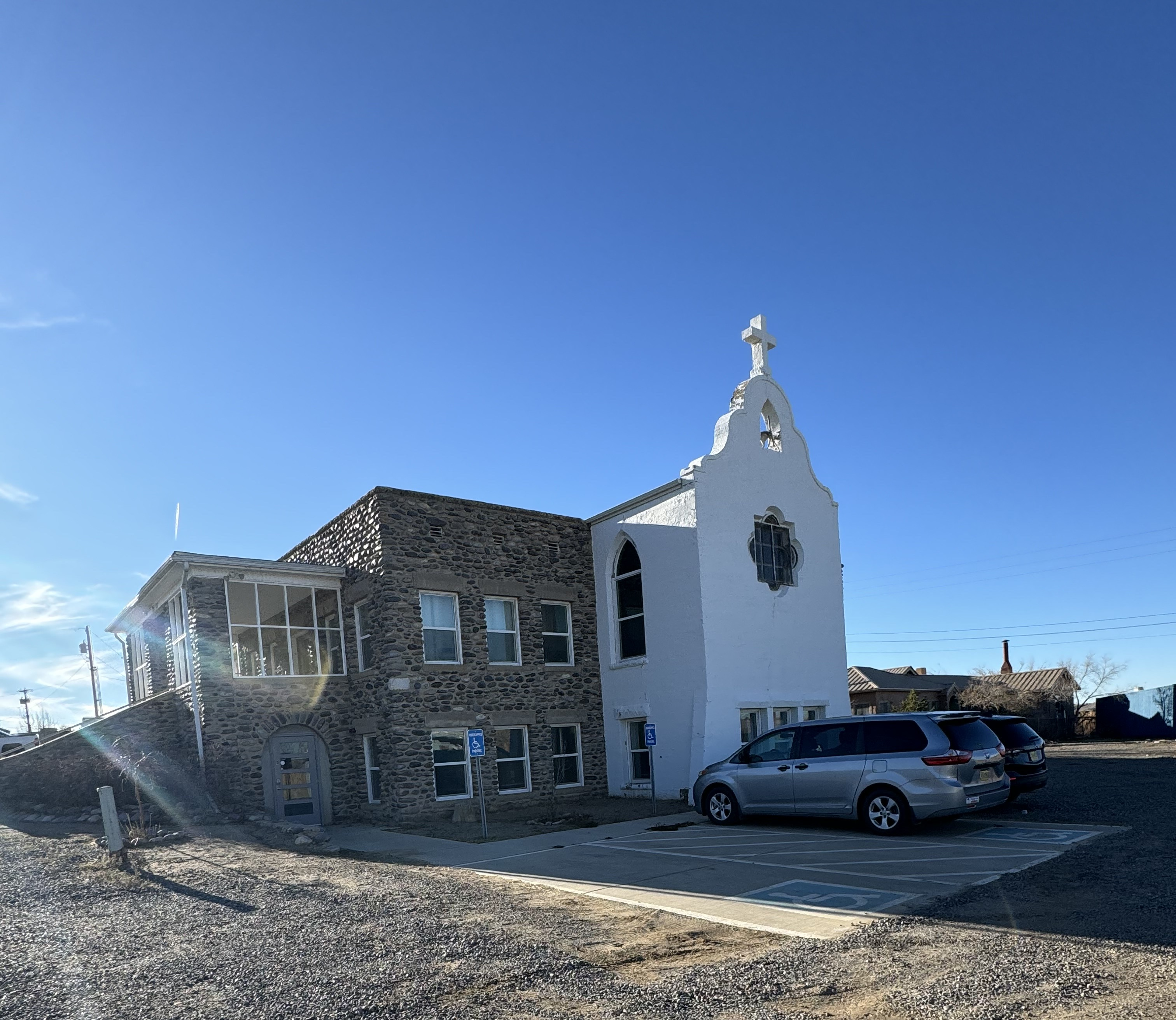
The old hospital building, now called the Hozho Building.

In 1928, Dr. Smith transferred his work to Dr. Michael D. Moran and Frances Gasele. Both had little experience with the Navajo but maintained hospital operations. Another nurse, Thelma Kelm, came to replace Gasele at the end of 1928. The hospital received great strength in August 1931 with the allocation of Jane Turnbull, a nurse from Los Angeles. She would serve the hospital and the mission for over 25 years, one of very few long-lasting medical personnel. During her time, the hospital expanded its operations with larger buildings and more patients. Her work allowed Kelm to travel to more remote areas of the reservation to provide care. By 1939, the success of the hospital spread far enough that those requesting care vastly outnumbered those who could give it. The hospital worked closely with San Juan Community Hospital—now the San Juan Regional Medical Center—whose resources greatly supplemented their work.

In October 1954, the hospital closed for repairs. The hospital had run on limited funds and services for many years, mostly tending to maternity and child care. With government hospitals more easily accessible, Bishop J.M. Stoney, Bishop of New Mexico and Southwest Texas debated whether a mission hospital was still needed. Projected to take seven months, this closure heavily impacted Native populations. Many protested its closure, as its services provided a primary source of care for a majority of them. In addition to providing a leave of absence for the hospital's sole nurse Turnbull, the building was to be renovated, a project which required more funds than they had available. Those who relied heavily on the hospital petitioned Navajo leaders and other community members for donations to keep the hospital functioning. After much protesting and a generous $10,000 donation from the New York office of the Episcopal Church, the mission secured Irene Gibbs as a temporary nurse, reopening in January 1955, after only four months of the planned seven-month closure. Turnbull returned to the mission in March and continued aiding patients.

The hospital has since been permanently closed and renamed the Hozho Building. It serves today as an auxiliary building for All Saint's Church.
