= Sara Wolfe =

Indigenous Canadian nurse, midwife, and healthcare advocate (born 1973)

- Born: 1973 (age 52–53)
- Citizenship: Brunswick House First Nation, Canadian
- Education: Rotman School of Management
- Occupations: nurse, midwife, healthcare advocate
- Years active: 1999–present
- Known for: Indigenous Midwifery

Sara Wolfe (born 1973) is an Anishnawbe registered nurse and registered midwife. She is the Director of the Indigenous Innovation Initiative at Grand Challenges Canada.

Wolfe is founding partner of Seventh Generation Midwives Toronto, which is a group of midwives who offer maternity care to women, particularly those from Toronto's downtown area and from the Indigenous community. Wolfe was a co-lead on the midwifery-led and Indigenous-governed Toronto Birth Centre. Wolfe is Anishnawbe (Ojibway) from the Brunswick House First Nation in northern Ontario.

== Education ==
Wolfe earned her master’s in business administration from the Rotman School of Management at the University of Toronto.

== Career ==
From 1999 to 2003, Wolfe was an Outpost Nurse in Sioux Lookout and Moose Factory.

Wolfe, with her fellow Indigenous midwifery students, Cheryllee Bourgeois and Ellen Blais, started the Toronto Aboriginal Midwives Initiative in 2002, and held community meetings and consultations to determine what Native community members wanted and needed.

She worked as a midwife for the Midwives Collective Toronto from 2003 to 2005. She was Head Midwife in the Dept. of Obstetrics and Gynaecology at Sunnybrook Women's College Hospital from 2005 to January 2012. From November 2012 to December 2013, she was Interim Executive Director and Midwife Project Co-Lead at the Toronto Birth Centre Inc. The Toronto Birth Centre provides pre-natal classes, labour, birth and postpartum care, complimentary breast-feeding support, massage therapy and nutritional counselling.

In collaboration with St. Michael's Hospital in Toronto, Wolfe and Seventh Generation Midwives took on a three-year research project called the Baby Bundle Project to address infant mortality and child removal rates that are higher in Indigenous communities compared to the general population in Canada. The goal of the research was to improve services for Indigenous families. While identifying barriers to access, the research also worked to identify and provide for mothers' needs, such as midwifery, housing, counselling, or culturally specific traditions.

Wolfe co-led a four-year research project about Indigenous people in Toronto that identified undercounting by Statistics Canada.

In 2020, the Indigenous Innovation Initiative, of which Sara Wolfe is the director, was launched. The goal is to promote Indigenous economic participation and innovation.

== Select bibliography ==
- Firestone, Michelle; Maddox, Raglan; O'Campo, Patricia; Smylie, Janet; Bourgeois, Cheryllee; Wolfe, Sara; Snelling, Susan; Manson, Heather; McKnight, Constance; Hebert, Jeanne; Boyer, Roger; Warry, Wayne; van Wagner, Vicki (2020). "Indigenous Health Service Evaluation: Principles and Guidelines from a Provincial "Three Ribbon" Expert Panel". Canadian Journal of Program Evaluation. 34 (3): 413–424. doi:10.3138/cjpe.68831. ISSN 0834-1516.
- Kitching, George Tjensvoll; Firestone, Michelle; Schei, Berit; Wolfe, Sara; Bourgeois, Cheryllee; O'Campo, Patricia; Rotondi, Michael; Nisenbaum, Rosane; Maddox, Raglan; Smylie, Janet (February 2020). "Unmet health needs and discrimination by healthcare providers among an Indigenous population in Toronto, Canada". Canadian Journal of Public Health. 111 (1): 40–49. doi:10.17269/s41997-019-00242-z. ISSN 0008-4263. PMC 7046890. PMID 31435849.

== See also ==
- Nicolle Gonzales
