= Waterflow, New Mexico =

Unincorporated community in New Mexico, US

Waterflow, New Mexico Tséyaa Akʼahí
- Unincorporated community
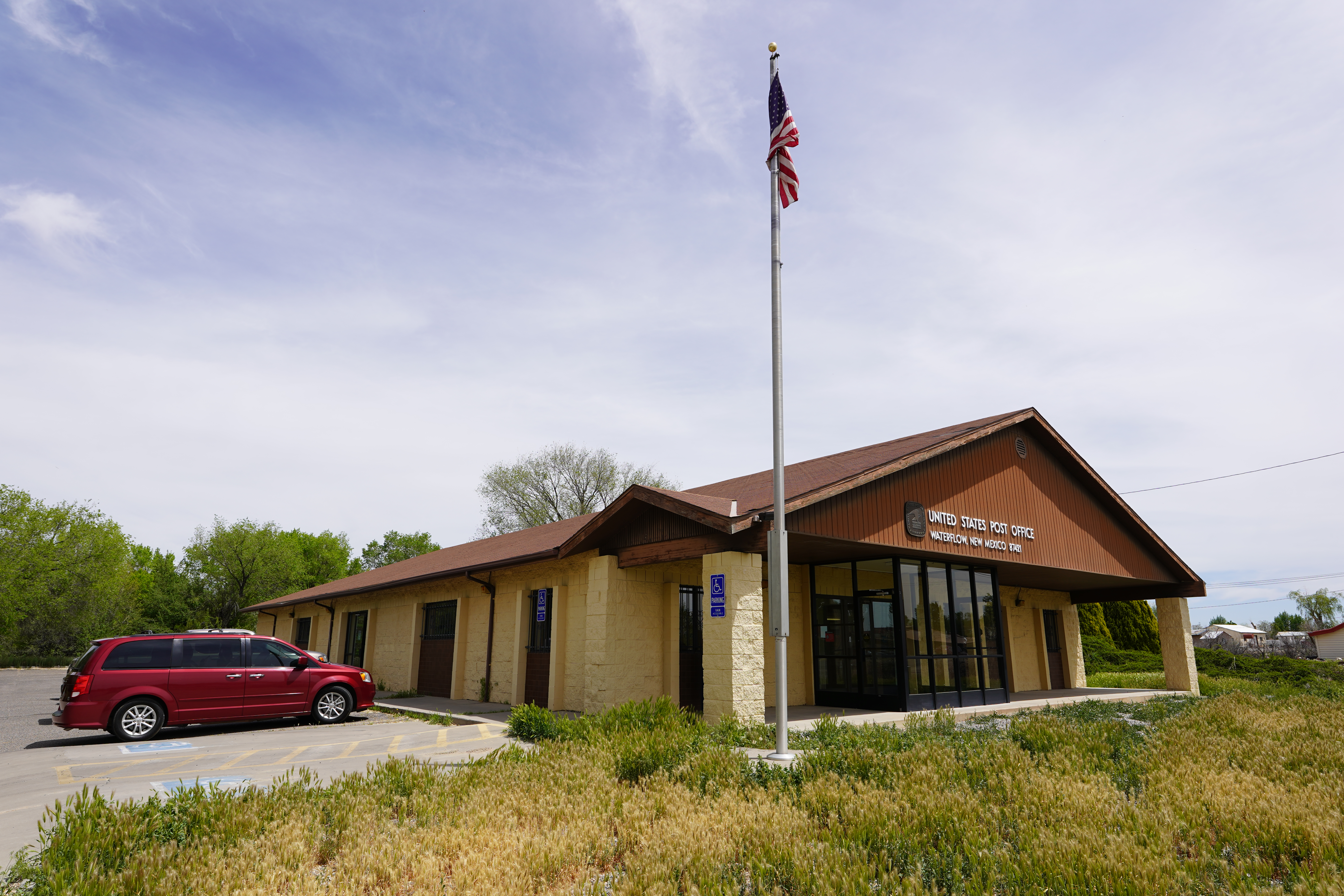
- Waterflow Post Office

- Location within New Mexico
- Coordinates: 36°45′15″N 108°28′03″W
- Country: United States
- State: New Mexico
- County: San Juan

Area
  - Total: 8.725 sq mi (22.60 km^{2})
  - Land: 8.323 sq mi (21.56 km^{2})
  - Water: 0.402 sq mi (1.04 km^{2})
- Elevation: 5,063 ft (1,543 m)

Population (2010)
  - Total: 1,670
  - Density: 201/sq mi (77.5/km^{2})
- Time zone: UTC-7 (Mountain (MST))
  - Summer (DST): UTC-6 (MDT)
- ZIP Code: 87421
- Area code: 505
- GNIS feature ID: 2584234

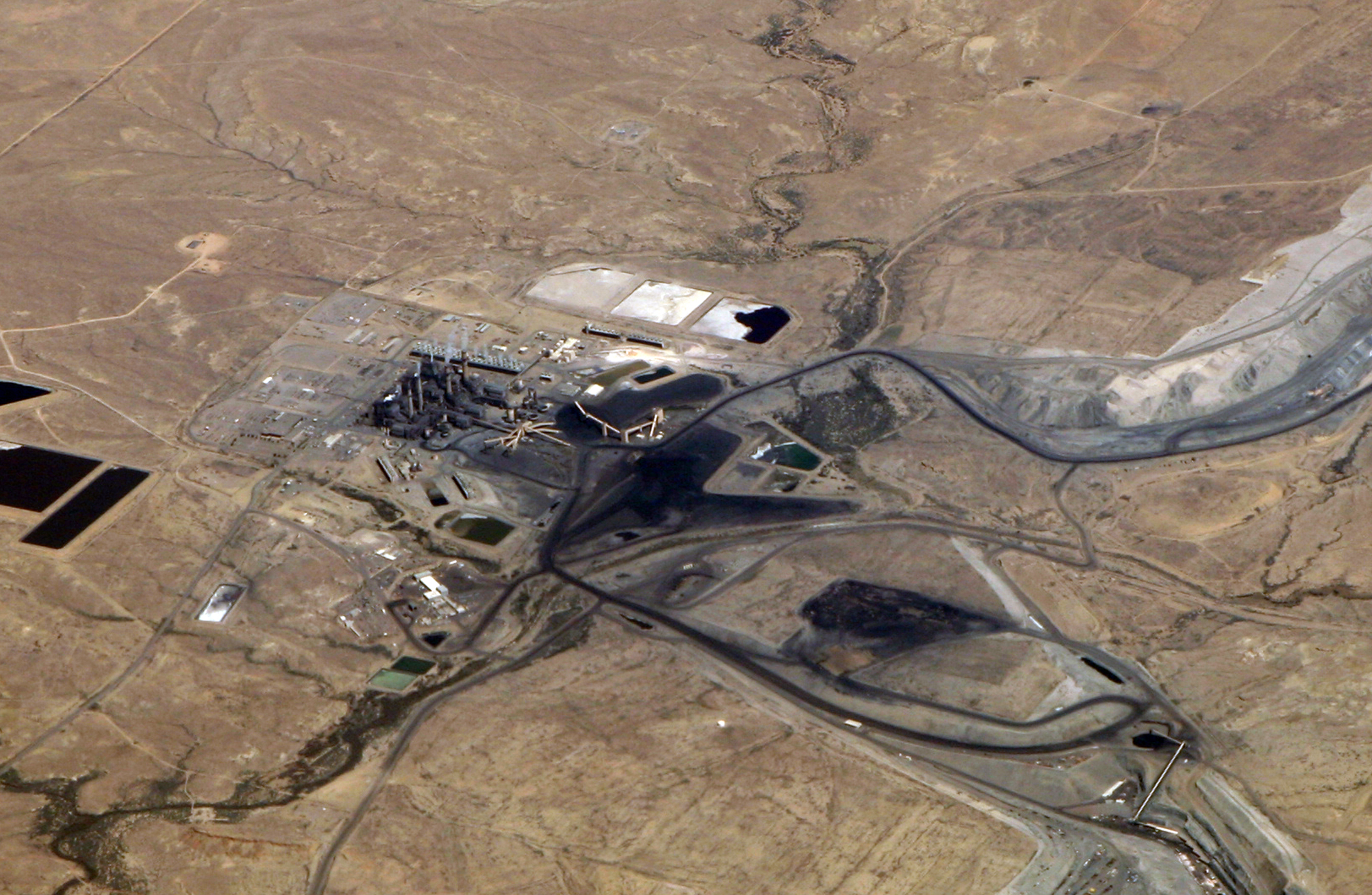
San Juan Generating Station (PNM) 2012. Mine is just to the right of this photo.

Waterflow (Navajo: Tséyaa Akʼahí) is an unincorporated community and census-designated place in San Juan County, New Mexico, United States on the north side of the San Juan River. It is immediately west of Fruitland and north across the river from the Navajo Nation. It is east of Shiprock.

As of the 2020 census, Waterflow had a population of 1,554.

== History ==
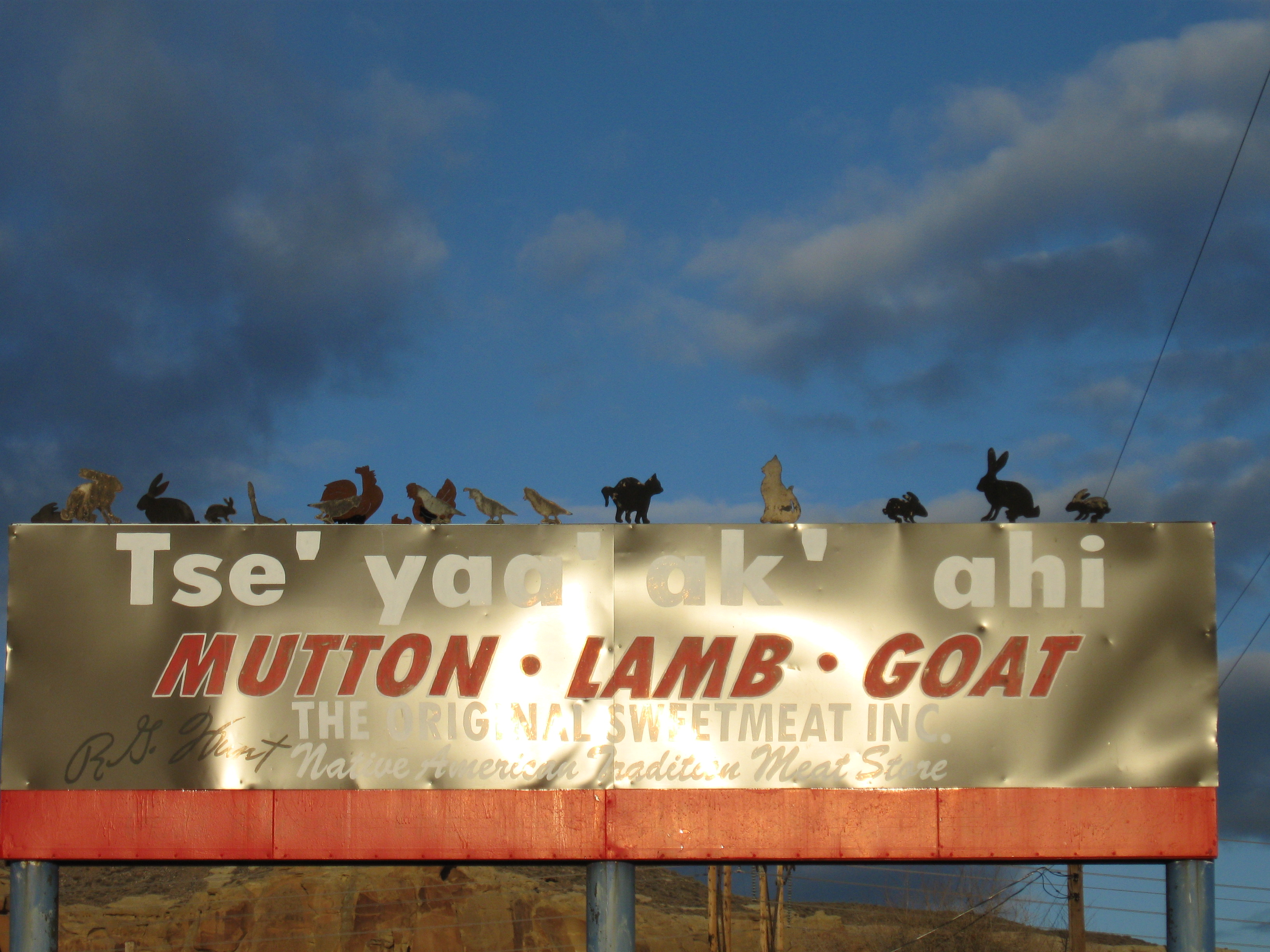
Advertising for Original Sweetmeat Inc. The billboard includes the apparent modern Navajo name for the place.

The area now known as Waterflow is traditional Navajo territory. This place was called Chʼį́įdii Łichííʼ (Red Devil) in reference to Walter Stallings who operated a trading post in the area; nowadays, Tséyaa Akʼahí (beneath-rock oil) seems to be another designation in reference to the nearby oil fields, as can be seen on billboards in the area (pictured).

The early Anglo settlers in this area named the place "Jewett Valley", and established Jewett Valley Cemetery as early as 1886. Although some reports say these pioneers were predominantly Catholic, one of the earliest families to be buried in this cemetery, the Hunts, have long been LDS.

Catholicism in Waterflow, New Mexico dates from February 22, 1912, when the first Mass was celebrated there in makeshift quarters. Three young men, Joseph and Lorenzo Stallings of Kentucky and David Watson of Georgia, Catholics, were among the pioneer settlers of the region. They called on the Franciscan Fathers at Farmington for help in establishing a church at Waterflow, which they called “Kentucky Mesa.” Sacred Heart Church was dedicated May 16, 1917.

The town was named "Jewett" in P. F. Collier's atlas as early as 1923. The local Catholic church remained a mission of Farmington but began to have a resident pastor in 1945. Since 1982, the Latter-day Saints have serviced their people in this area through the Kirtland Stake which covers from Kirtland west to Shiprock, New Mexico, and beyond.

== Geography ==
Waterflow is a high desert valley with the highest point being a geological hogback called "Hogback". The San Juan River and Shumway Arroyo are important water resources in the area.

== Demographics ==
In 2010, Waterflow reported a total population of 1,670 people. 823 were male, and 807 were female. 809 identified themselves as White, 12 identified themselves as Black, 3 identified themselves as Asian, 171 were Hispanic, and 743 were Navajo. 620 speak a language other than English at home. With 551 housing units and a land area of 8.323 sq. miles, there are approximately 190 people per sq. mile in Waterflow.

== Industry ==
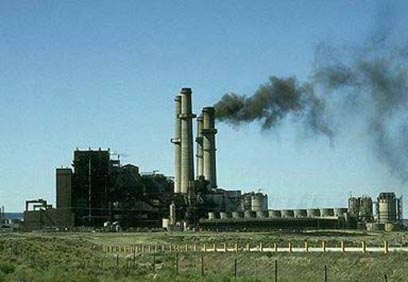
PNM San Juan Generating Station

Waterflow lies between two coal-fired power plants and southwest of a large coal mine. The area also has many oil wells.

While convenient for employment, this proximity has caused several large environmental issues. Because of this, air quality in Waterflow is 1 on a scale to 100 (higher is better). This is based on ozone alert days and number of pollutants in the air. Groundwater near the San Juan coal mine in Waterflow is extremely polluted according to both the Sierra Club and New Mexico Mining and Minerals Division.

A billboard in Waterflow.

The Sierra Club alleges that the San Juan Coal Company has improperly dumped more than 40 million tons of coal ash and sludge into unlined pits, resulting in the contamination of waterways and wells near the mine.

The group says that the waste, and the contaminated water, pose a danger to livestock, wildlife and families in the area, and in early December 2007, the Sierra Club announced its intent to sue the owners of the San Juan Coal Company.

The company denies responsibility for the contamination.

== Education ==
Central Consolidated Schools serves Waterflow as well as other communities in western San Juan County.

== Notable people ==
Notable people from Waterflow include:

- Nicolle Gonzales, Navajo midwife
