= Nicolle Gonzales =

Navajo certified midwife (born 1980)

Nicolle Gonzales (born March 15, 1980, in Waterflow, New Mexico) is a Navajo certified midwife. She is the founder of the Changing Woman Initiative, which is the nation's first combined Native American birthing and reproductive wellness center, in her home state, New Mexico.

== Biography ==
She studied at the University of New Mexico. She first received her bachelor's degree in nursing, followed by a master's degree in midwifery. She is a member of the American College of Nurse-Midwives and is certified with the American Midwifery Certification Board.

Gonzales trained as a midwife after traumatic experiences during the birth of her first child. At the time, she was the only Native American midwife-nurse student in the country.

Gonzales has publicly spoken about the need of culturally informed maternal healthcare for Indigenous people. In various interviews and public testimonies, she has discussed obstacles that Native women go through regarding healthcare access. This includes lack of prenatal care services on rural communities and lack of Indigenous representation within healthcare systems. During her time working as a nurse and midwife, she understood the need for culturally competent reproductive healthcare.

She has worked at Santa Fe Indian Hospital.

Gonzales discusses how Indigenous women have experienced healthcare disparities, especially in rural communities that lack access to prenatal and reproductive healthcare. In addition, she emphasizes the importance for Indigenous representation in healthcare services and culturally informed reproductive care. She also argues that traditional Indigenous healthcare practices can be beneficial to improving maternal health outcomes among Native communities.

Gonzales lives in Santa Fe, New Mexico. She is a long-distance runner.

== Changing Woman Initiative ==
Gonzales is the founder of Changing Woman Initiative (CWI), a non-profit organization which aims to improve the experience of childbirth for Indigenous women. Access to maternal healthcare can expensive and can be limited for Indigenous women living in rural communities. The organization aims to create spaces where Native women feel safe, respected, spiritually supported, and where Native healthcare professionals can incorporate traditional healing into their practice. They offer prenatal care, fresh produce, at-home services, doula assistance, and bodywork.

Gonzales also aims to reduce childbirth-related costs and provide services to help with the cost of women's health in general. The clinic's policy is that they "don’t turn any woman away," and they secure grant funding to ensure they can still support uninsured women and women with insurance providers such as Medicaid which do not always cover traditional medicine.

CWI also focuses on culturally based healthcare and reproductive wellness services for Indigenous communities. Additionally, it aims to promote healthcare practices that integrate medical treatment with culture, family, and community health programs. Lastly, the organization also supports midwives in Indigenous communities and maternal healthcare services.

The Changing Woman Initiative has also expressed their interest in a reproductive justice and wellness among Indigenous communities. Its programs seek to support women and their families by offering healthcare services that include both medical care with traditional practices. The organization has emphasized the need to restore Indigenous birthing practices and the increase of more Indigenous healthcare professionals. Programs associated with the initiative have focused on family support, reproductive education, and community based maternal health approaches.

Gonzales has also advocated for increasing access to healthcare services among Indigenous women living in rural areas. She has addressed challenges including transportation barriers, shortage of healthcare professionals, lack of healthcare access. She argues that increased Indigenous representation in the healthcare industry may improve communication between patients and providers.

Conversations concerning the Changing Woman Initiative have been connected to extensive discussions involving reproductive justice, Indigenous healthcare sovereignty, and maternal healthcare in the United States. The CWI is also responsible for funding the education of Native and Indigenous midwives who want to provide their services in their communities.

CWI also funds education for Native and Indigenous midwives who want to provide similar services in their communities.

== Advocacy and maternal healthcare ==
Gonzales has participated in discussions surrounding racial inequalities in maternal healthcare in the United States, particularly those impacting Indigenous people and rural communities. She is outspoken about barriers such as limited access to prenatal care services, shortage of healthcare practitioners, inadequate transport services, and a lack of available cultural healthcare service providers.

Gonzales has advocated for increased Indigenous representation in the healthcare workforce, emphasizing that culturally competent healthcare may potentially improve communication between health providers and patients. Additionally, other issues Gonzales has also been involved in include reproductive justice and Indigenous healthcare sovereignty and birthing practices.

Through various advocacy efforts and the CWI, Gonzales has promoted programs dedicated to reproductive well-being, maternal healthcare education, and community based healthcare approaches. Her advocacy work has supported conversations around maternal health disparities and culturally centered healthcare services in the United States.

== See also ==
- Annie Dodge Wauneka, 20th-century Navajo healthcare activist
- Sara Wolfe
- Contemporary Native American issues in the United States
- Cultural competence in healthcare
- Health status of Native Americans in the United States
- Healthcare in the United States
- Midwives Alliance of North America
- Native American health care
