= Clovis Baptist Hospital =

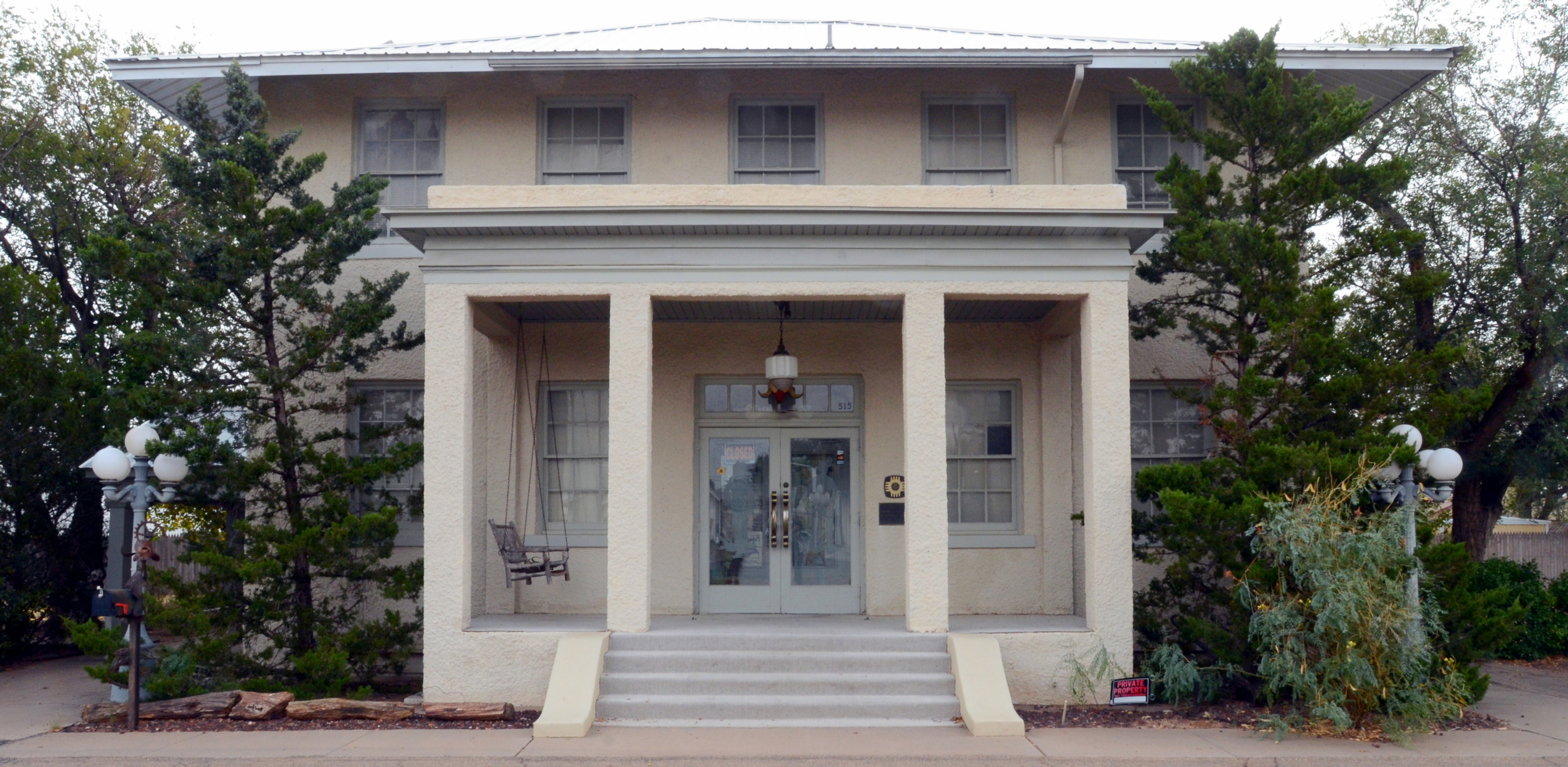

Geography
- Location: Clovis, New Mexico, United States

Organization
- Religious affiliation: Baptist

History
- Opened: October 7, 1920
- Closed: 1939

Links
- Lists: Hospitals in New Mexico
- Clovis Baptist Hospital
- U.S. National Register of Historic Places
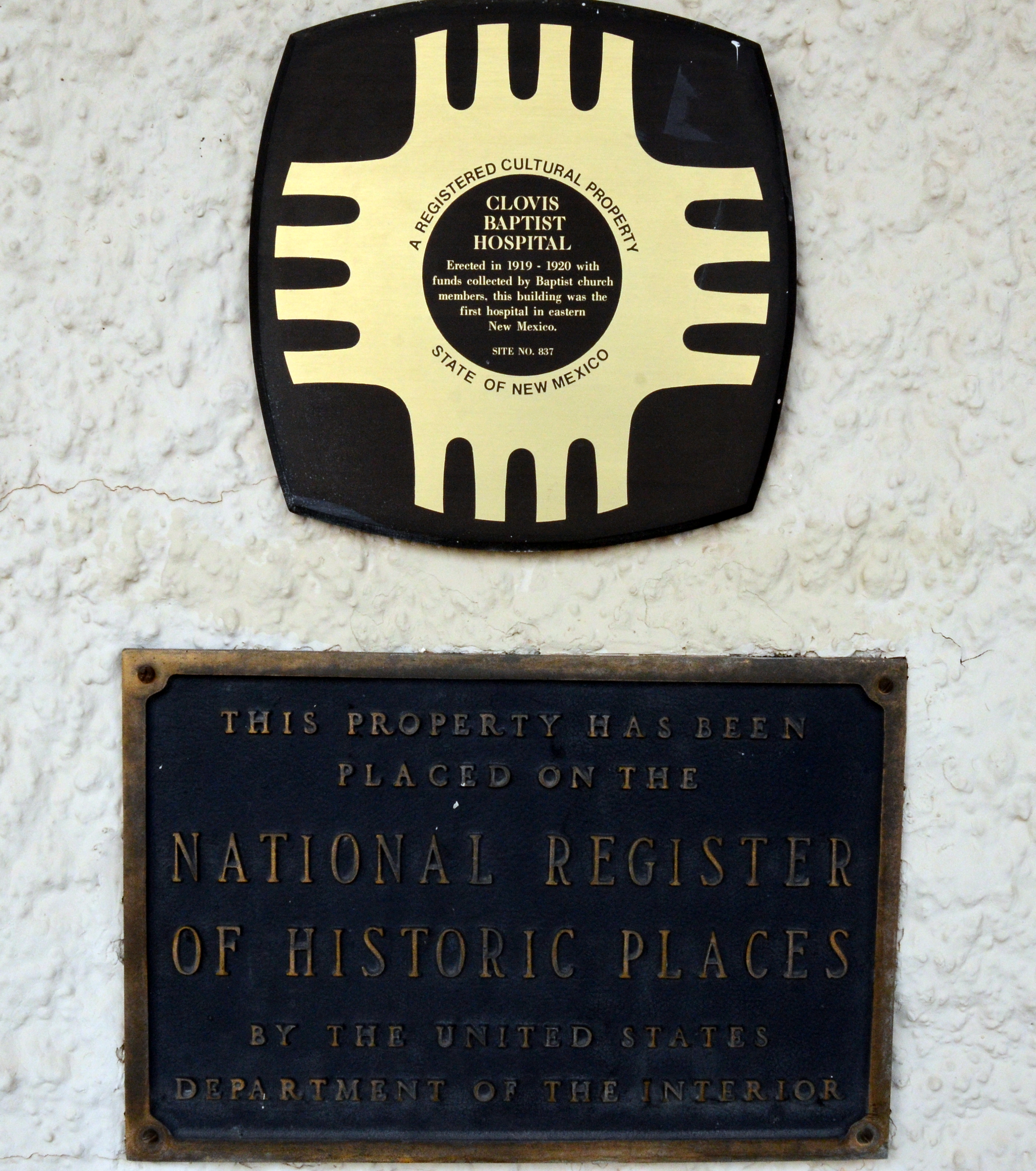
- Location: 515 Prince St., Clovis, New Mexico
- Coordinates: 34°24′12″N 103°11′44″W
- Area: 1 acre (0.40 ha)
- Built: 1919-1920
- NRHP reference No.: 82003322
- Added to NRHP: February 5, 1982

The Clovis Baptist Hospital, located at 515 Prince St. in Clovis in Curry County, New Mexico, was built in 1919–1920. It was listed on the National Register of Historic Places in 1982.

It is a two-story stuccoed building with a hipped roof. It has a projecting entry portico with square stuccoed columns. It was built as the result of a drive by Clovis-area Baptists, including of the First Baptist Church, Clovis, to create the first hospital in the area. It was described at its opening on October 7, 1920, as "'the only city of refuge on the high plains of eastern New Mexico.'"

It was operated as a hospital for 19 years until 1939, when a larger hospital was opened. The building then was re-used as the Ramsey Hotel. In 1981 it was in use as a restaurant and art gallery, "The Landmark".
