= Jennifer Attrep =

American lawyer

Judge of the New Mexico Court of Appeals
- Incumbent
- Assumed office 2018
- Appointed by: Susana Martinez
- Preceded by: Timothy L. Garcia

Personal details
- Born: Jennifer Lynn Attrep; 1977 or 1978 (age 48–49) Dallas, Texas, U.S.
- Spouse: Todd Coberly
- Education: College of William & Mary (BA); University of Virginia (JD)

Jennifer L. Attrep is an American lawyer and jurist serving as a judge of the New Mexico Court of Appeals. She assumed office in 2018.

== Early life and education ==
Alltrep is the daughter of Moses and Katherine (nee' Gerloff) Attrep. Born in Dallas and raised in Los Alamos, New Mexico,where father worked as a scientist at Los Alamos National Laboratory, Attrep graduated from Los Alamos High School. She earned a Bachelor of Arts degree from the College of William & Mary in 1999 and a Juris Doctor from the University of Virginia School of Law in 2006. Attrep was the managing editor of the Virginia Law Review.

== Career ==
Attrep served as a law clerk for Judge Richard J. Leon of the United States District Court for the District of Columbia. She also practiced at Williams & Connolly before returning home to New Mexico, working as a private practice attorney in Santa Fe. In 2014, Attrep was appointed to the First Judicial District Court of New Mexico by Republican Governor Susana Martinez. In 2018, Martinez appointed Attrep to the New Mexico Court of Appeals. She became chief judge in 2023.
