= CHRISTUS St. Vincent Regional Medical Center =

Coordinates: 35.659°N 105.945°W

Christus St. Vincent Regional Medical Center
- Christus Health
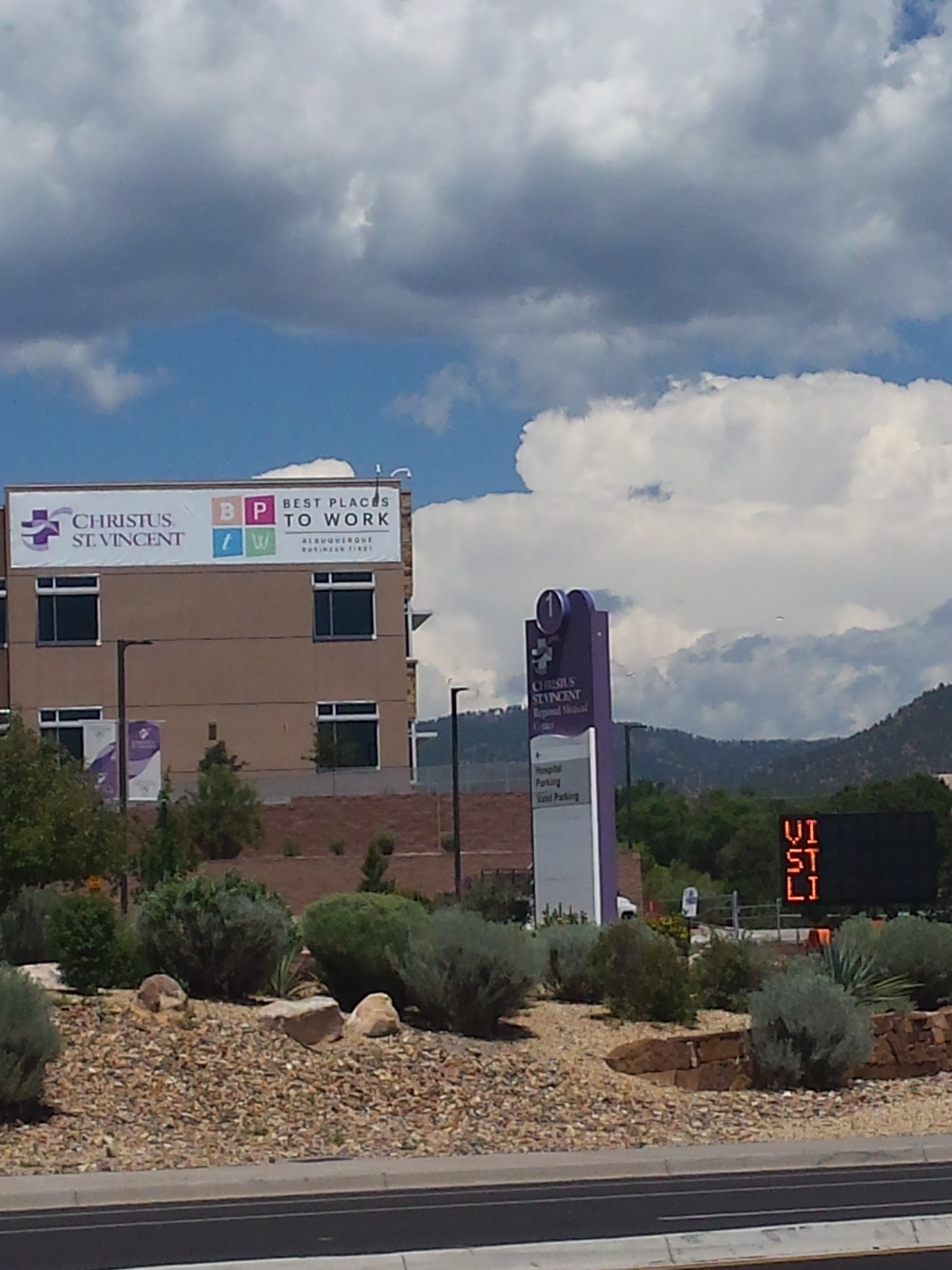

Geography
- Location: Santa Fe, New Mexico, United States

Organization
- Type: General

Services
- Emergency department: Level III trauma center
- Beds: 206 all private

History
- Opened: 1865

Links
- Website: http://christushealth.org/st-vincent
- Lists: Hospitals in New Mexico

Christus St. Vincent Regional Medical Center is a general hospital located in Santa Fe, New Mexico, United States. The hospital is the oldest in the State of New Mexico, since being established in the downtown plaza before it was moved in 1977 to developing St. Michaels Drive. It is the largest medical facility north of Albuquerque and the largest south of Pueblo, Colorado. It is one of two Level III Trauma Center in Northern New Mexico. It is now the center of a network of over 30 locations, including urgent care locations, family medicine centers, surgical center, cancer care, and women's specialty clinics. See list below.

A religious institution until it became public in 1973, it joined the Christus Health network of Catholic hospitals in 2008. In 2018, the culmination of a $44 million expansion is resulting in all-private patient rooms, which was the most-requested feature in a 2014 survey of the local area population.

== Services and clinics ==
- Behavioral Health
- Brain and Spine (Neurosurgery)
- Cancer Center
- Digestive Health (Gastroenterology)
- Emergency
- Urgent Care
- Health Gym (Center for Living Well)
- Heart and Vascular
- Hospitalist
- Infectious Disease
- Laboratory
- Labor and Delivery
- Orthopaedic
- Outpatient Therapy (Sports Medicine)
- Pediatric
- Physical Rehab (Inpatient Rehab)
- Pulmonary and Critical Care
- Radiology and Imaging
- Sleep
- Surgical
- Urology
- Weight Loss Surgery Program (Bariatrics)
- Women's Health
- Wound Care and Hyperbaric Oxygen Therapy
- Breast Institute
- Geriatrics and Internal Medicine
- Health Specialists – Los Alamos
- Heart and Vascular Center
- Neurosurgical Associates
- Orthopedics and Sports Medicine Associates
- Orthopedics of New Mexico
- Physical Medicine and Rehabilitation Specialists
- Pulmonary and Critical Care Associates
- Regional Cancer Center
- Sports Medicine – Los Alamos
- Surgical Associates
- Urology Associates
- Women's Care Specialists
- Dermatology
