= List of hospitals in New Mexico =

This is a list of hospitals in New Mexico (U.S. state), grouped by city and sorted by hospital name. With a population of a little over 2 million, there were 37 hospitals in New Mexico in 2019. The largest number of hospitals are in Albuquerque. Tribal areas are serviced by hospitals run by the Indian Health Service.

== Acoma ==
- Acoma-Canoncito-Laguna Hospital (United States Public Health Service, Indian Health Service), 6 staffed beds (35.068430°N 107.571650°W)

== Alamogordo ==
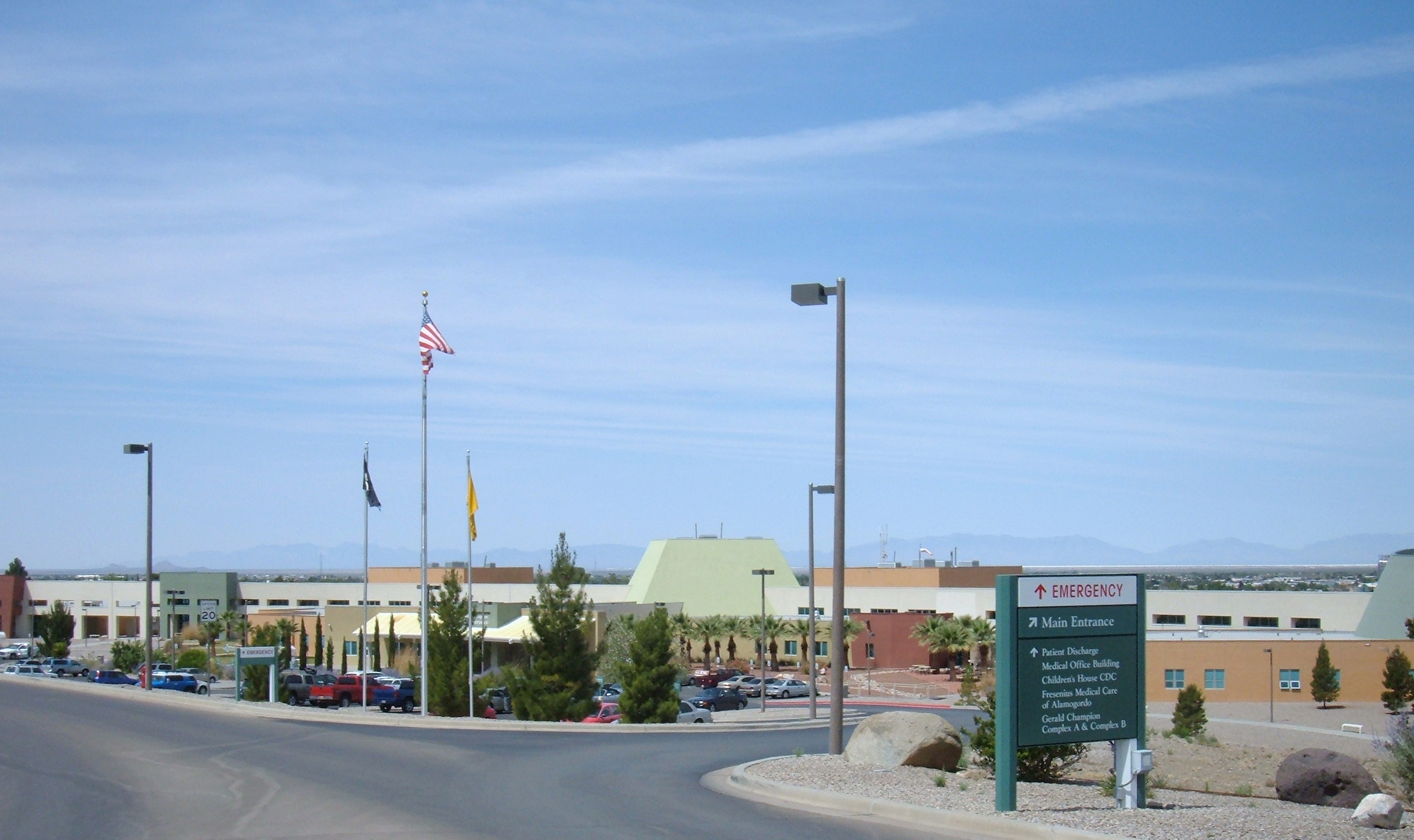
Gerald-Champion Regional Medical Center

- Gerald Champion Regional Medical Center, 98 staffed beds (32.924552°N 105.934687°W)

== Albuquerque ==
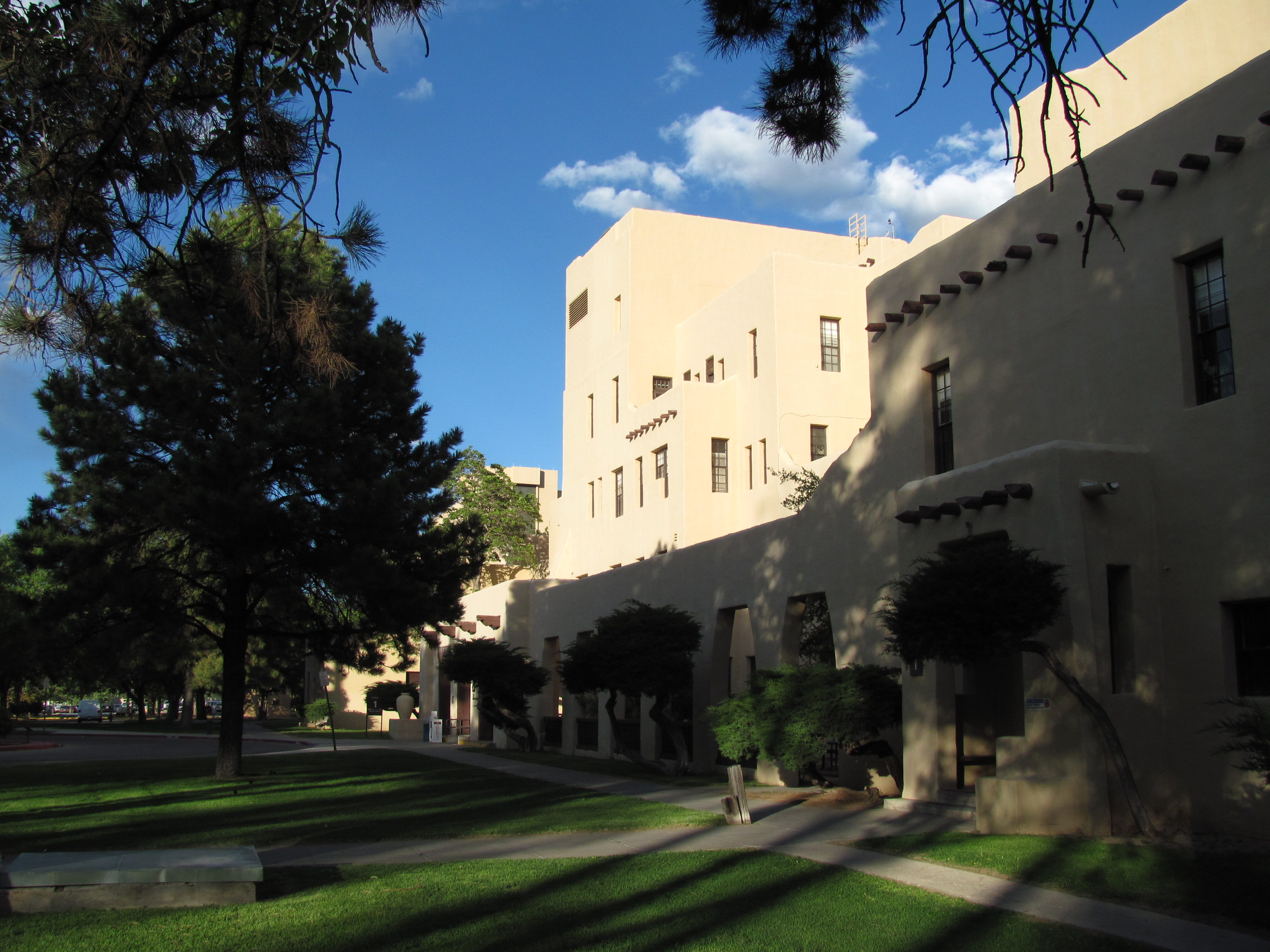
Albuquerque VA Medical Center

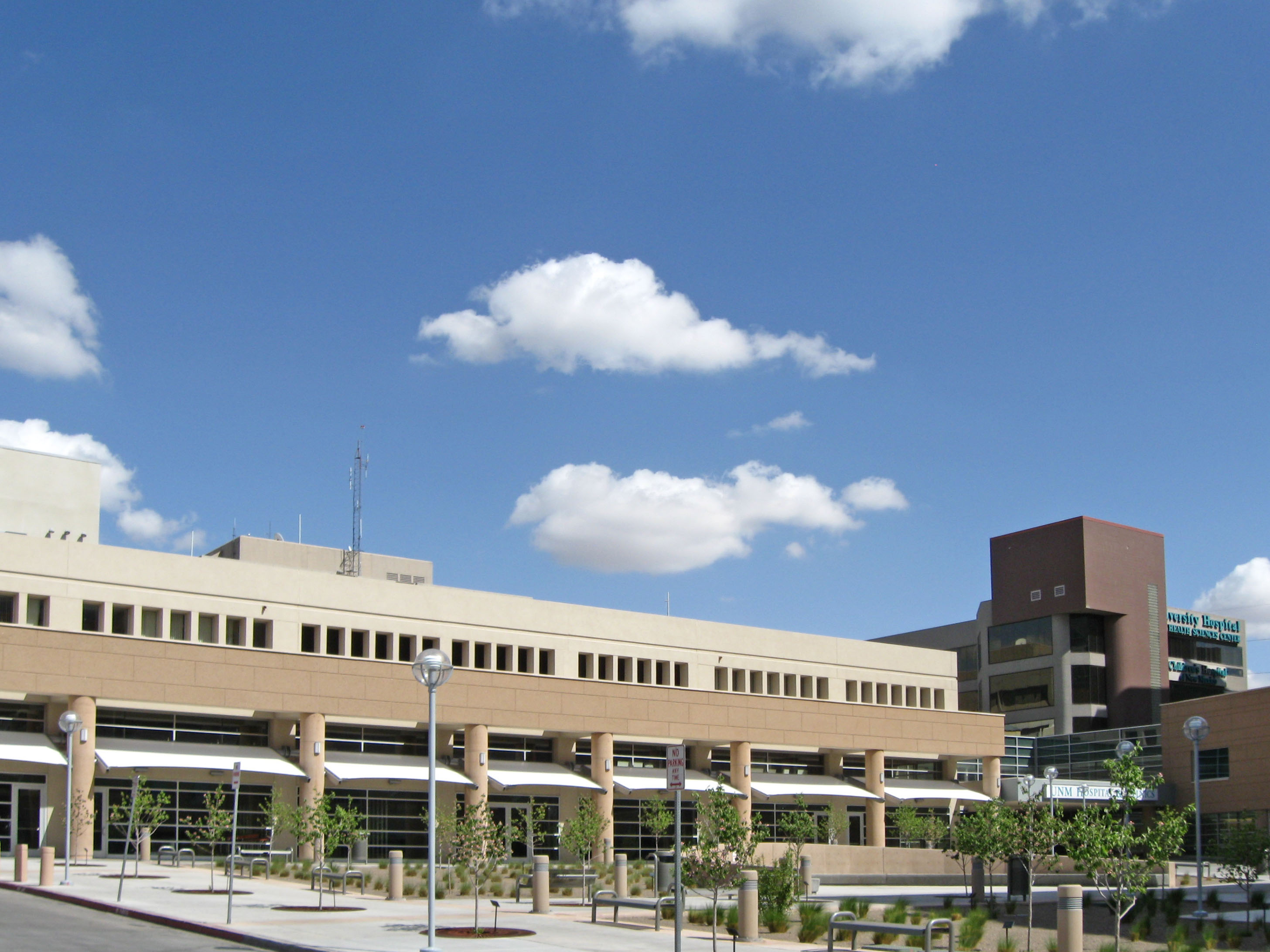
UNM Hospital, Alququerque

- Lovelace Health System
  - The Heart Hospital of New Mexico at Lovelace Medical Center, 55 staffed beds (35.087687°N 106.637064°W
  - Lovelace Medical Center, 293 staffed beds (35.086845°N 106.638555°W)
  - Lovelace Rehabilitation Hospital (35.088294°N 106.638030°W)
  - Lovelace Westside Hospital (West Mesa Medical Center), 70 staffed beds (35.207414°N 106.677334°W
  - Lovelace Women's Hospital, 162 staffed beds (35.131511°N 106.591782°W)
- New Mexico VA Health Care System
  - Raymond G. Murphy VA Medical Center, 310 authorized beds (35.055085°N 106.582345°W)
- Presbyterian Healthcare Services
  - Presbyterian Hospital, 716 staffed beds (35.081823°N 106.635436°W)
  - Presbyterian Kaseman Hospital, 85 staffed beds (35.093529°N 106.553213°W)
- University of New Mexico Hospitals
  - UNM Carrie Tingley Hospital (35.093695°N 106.627021°W)
  - UNM Children's Hospital (35.088099°N 106.618850°W)
  - UNM Children's Psychiatric Center (35.092896°N 106.621444°W)
  - UNM Hospital, 555 staffed beds (35.088°N 106.618°W)
  - UNM Psychiatric Center (35.090908°N 106.616136°W)
  - ABQ Dental Care (35.129997°N 106.524837°W)

== Artesia ==
- Artesia General Hospital, 49 staffed beds (32.848871°N 104.411162°W)

== Carlsbad ==
- Carlsbad Medical Center, 95 staffed beds (32.442677°N 104.258042°W)

== Clayton ==
- Union County General Hospital (36.455134°N 103.193415°W)

== Clovis ==
- Clovis Baptist Hospital (defunct) (34°24′12″N 103°11′44″W)
- Plains Regional Medical Center, 106 staffed beds

== Crownpoint ==
- Crownpoint Healthcare Facility (United States Public Health Service, Indian Health Service), 19 staffed beds (35.698879°N 108.139688°W)

== Deming ==
- Mimbres Memorial Hospital (32.260581°N 107.767821°W)

== Española ==
- Presbyterian Española Hospital, 52 staffed beds (35.997531°N 106.088509°W)

== Farmington ==
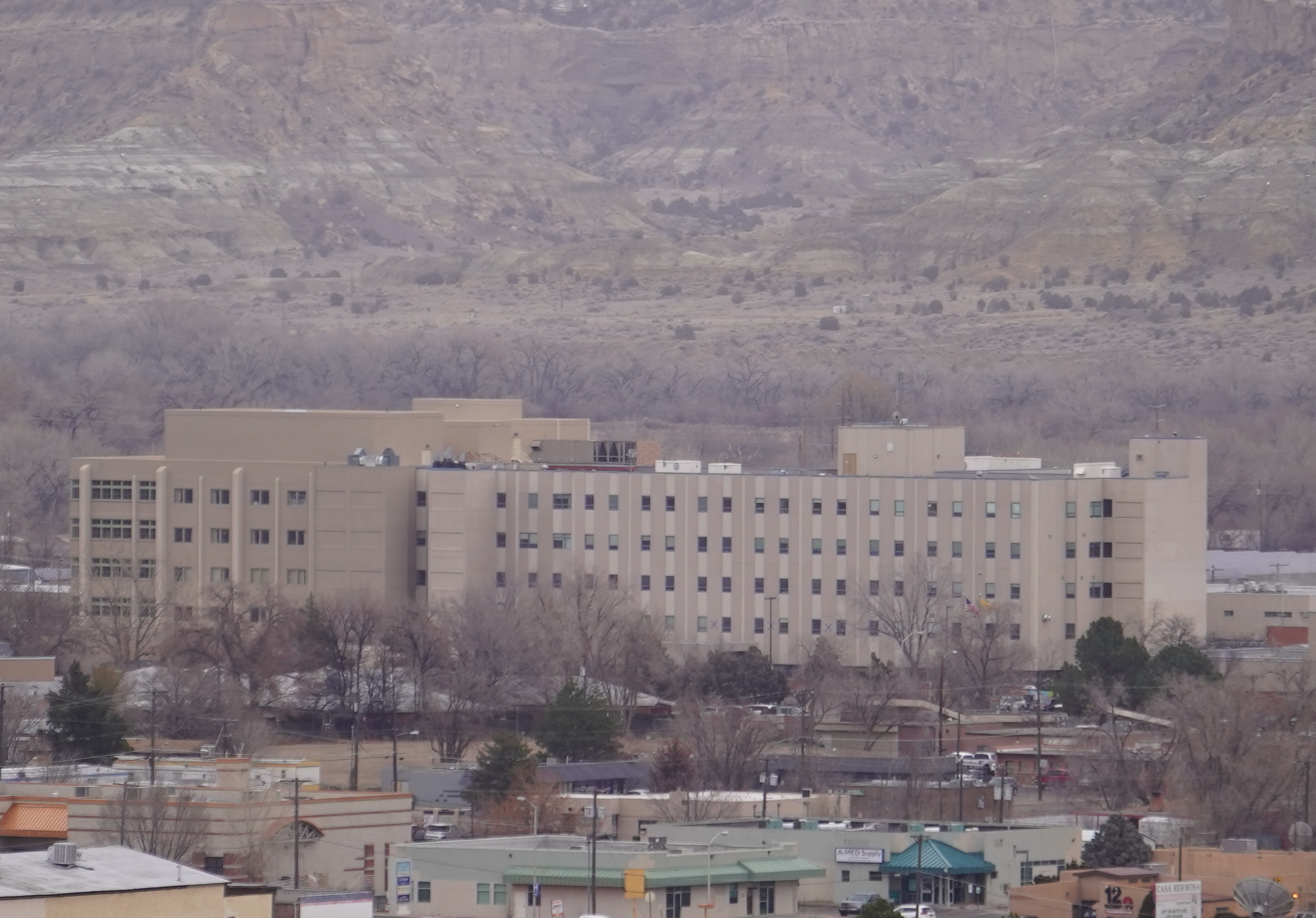
San Juan Regional Medical Center

- San Juan Regional Medical Center, 198 staffed beds (36.724194°N 108.216896°W)

== Gallup ==
- Gallup Indian Medical Center, 74 staffed beds (35.507840°N 108.730109°W)
- Rehoboth McKinley Christian Health Care Services, 28 staffed beds 35.507054°N 108.727642°W)

== Grants ==
- Cibola General Hospital (35.162725°N 107.827064°W)

== Hobbs ==
- Lea Regional Medical Center, 92 staffed beds (32.761593°N 103.184760°W)

== Las Cruces ==
- Advanced Care Hospital of Southern New Mexico (32.326251°N 106.725069°W)
- Memorial Medical Center, 199 staffed beds (32.292677°N 106.737182°W)
- Mesilla Valley Hospital (32.359440°N 106.774175°W)
- Mountain View Regional Medical Center, 180 staffed beds (32.323626°N 106.728320°W)
- Rehabilitation Hospital of Southern New Mexico (32.325344°N 106.724221°W)
- UNM Cancer Center (Southern New Mexico Cancer Center)
- Three Crosses Regional Hospital [www.threecrossesregional.com]

== Las Vegas ==
- Alta Vista Regional Hospital, 46 staffed beds (35.672509°N 105.237166°W)
- New Mexico Behavioral Health Institute at Las Vegas (35.603139°N 105.221698°W)

== Los Alamos ==
- Los Alamos Medical Center, 48 staffed beds (35.881861°N 106.319811°W)

== Lovington ==
- Nor-Lea General Hospital (32.964700°N 103.348300°W)

== Mescalero ==
- Mescalero Hospital (United States Public Health Service, Indian Health Service), 6 staffed beds

== Portales ==
- Roosevelt General Hospital, 20 staffed beds

== Raton ==
- Miners' Colfax Medical Center

== Rio Rancho ==
- Presbyterian Medical Center-Rio Rancho
- RUST (Presbyterian) Hospital, 0 staffed beds
- UNM Sandoval Regional Medical Center, 60 staffed beds

== Roswell ==
- Eastern New Mexico Medical Center, 162 staffed beds
- Lovelace Regional Hospital, Roswell, 27 staffed beds
- New Mexico Rehabilitation Center

== Ruidoso ==
- Lincoln County Medical Center

== Santa Fe ==
- CHRISTUS St. Vincent Physicians Medical Center, 12 staffed beds
- CHRISTUS St. Vincent Regional Medical Center, 214 staffed beds
- Santa Fe Indian Hospital (United States Public Health Service, Indian Health Service), 4 staffed beds
- Presbyterian Santa Fe Medical Center, 36 staffed beds

== Santa Rosa ==
- Guadalupe County Hospital, 10 staffed beds

== Santa Teresa ==
- Peak Behavioral Health Services

== Shiprock ==
- Northern Navajo Medical Center, 60 staffed beds

== Silver City ==
- Gila Regional Medical Center, 42 staffed beds

== Socorro ==
- Socorro General Hospital

== Taos ==
- Holy Cross Hospital

== Truth or Consequences ==
- Sierra Vista Hospital

== Tucumcari ==
- Dr. Dan C. Trigg Memorial Hospital

== Zuni ==
- Zuni Hospital (United States Public Health Service, Indian Health Service), 27 staffed beds

== Indian Health Service facilities ==
The Albuquerque Area of the Indian Health Service contains the following medical centers:

- Acoma-Canoncito-Laguna Service Unit (with hospital) (Acoma, New Mexico)
- Albuquerque Indian Health Center (with hospital)
- Albuquerque Indian Dental Clinic
- Jicarilla Service Unit (Dulce, New Mexico)
- Mescalero Service Unit (with hospital in Mescalero, New Mexico)
- New Sunrise Regional Treatment Center
- Santa Ana Health Center (Bernalillo, New Mexico)
- Santa Fe Service Unit (with hospital in Santa Fe, New Mexico)
- Taos-Picuris Service Unit (Taos, New Mexico)
- Ute Mountain Ute Service Unit (Towaoc, Colorado)
- Zia Health Clinic (Zia Pueblo, New Mexico)
- Zuni Comprehensive Health Center (with hospital) (Zuni, New Mexico)

The Navajo Area of the Indian Health Service is partially within New Mexico. It contains the following medical centers:

- Chinle Comprehensive Health Care Facility (Chinle, Arizona)
- Crownpoint Health Care Facility (Crownpoint, New Mexico)
- Dzilth-Na-O-Dith-Hle Health Center (Bloomfield, New Mexico)
- Fort Defiance Indian Hospital
- Four Corners Regional Health Center (Teec Nos Pos, Arizona)
- Gallup Indian Medical Center (Gallup, New Mexico)
- Inscription House Health Center (Shonto, Arizona)
- Kayenta Health Center (Kayenta, Arizona)
- Pinon Health Center (Pinon, Arizona)
- Shiprock-Northern Navajo Medical Centerb(Shiprock, New Mexico)
- Tohatchi Health Care Center (Southeastern portion of the Navajo Nation)
- Tsaile Health Center (Tsaile, Arizona)
- Tuba City Regional Health Care Corporation (Tuba City, Arizona)
- Winslow Indian Health Care Center (Winslow, Arizona)

== Former hospitals ==
Hospital	County	City	Bed count	Trauma center	Founded	Closed	Notes
Valmora Sanatorium	Mora County	Watrous					
