= Mamie Deschillie =

Navajo artist (1920–2010)

- Born: 1920; Burnham, Navajo Nation, New Mexico
- Died: 2010 (aged 89–90); Farmington, New Mexico
- Known for: Folk Art

Mamie Deschillie (1920–2010) was a Navajo folk artist.

Born in either Chaco or Burnham, New Mexico, on the Navajo Nation Reservation, Deschillie lived near Farmington. Described at her death as "a traditional Navajo", she spoke limited English, and frequently wore velvet. Mother of five children, she became an artist after the death of her husband, Chee Ford Deschillie, in 1979. She had little formal education, but in childhood learned to weave, and went on to gain some fame for her weaving before moving into other artistic pursuits. She was known for making mud toys of sun-dried clay, mainly in animal forms such as those of cows, sheep, buffalo, and horses and riders. She would decorate them with fur, cloth, or jewelry before touching them up with paint. In the 1980s she began to make cutouts of cardboard, also decorated with found objects and pieces of jewelry. Her smallest piece was a ten-inch horse and female rider; larger pieces extend up to three feet in height.

Several of Deschillie's works are in the collection of the Smithsonian American Art Museum. Her work is also held by the Museum of Northern Arizona and the Wheelwright Museum of the American Indian.
