= Kirtland, New Mexico =

- town
- Location of former Kirtland, New Mexico CDP

- Location in the United States
- Coordinates: 36°44′36″N 108°21′30″W
- Country: United States
- State: New Mexico
- County: San Juan
- Established: January 6, 2015

Area
  - Total: 1.76 sq mi (4.57 km^{2})
  - Land: 1.72 sq mi (4.46 km^{2})
  - Water: 0.042 sq mi (0.11 km^{2})
- Elevation: 5,233 ft (1,595 m)

Population (2020)
  - Total: 585
  - Density: 339.8/sq mi (131.18/km^{2})
- Time zone: UTC-07:00 (MST)
  - Summer (DST): UTC-06:00 (MDT)
- ZIP code: 87417
- Area code: 505
- FIPS code: 35-36230
- GNIS feature ID: 2783911
- Website: kirtlandnm.org

Kirtland is a town, made up of part of the former census-designated place (CDP) of the same name in San Juan County, New Mexico, United States. As of the 2020 census, Kirtland had a population of 585. It is part of the Farmington Metropolitan Statistical Area.

== History ==
Kirtland was founded in the early 1880s by Mormon settlers, who named it after Kirtland, Ohio. (Reflecting its history and principal demographic, the city's principal thoroughfare is Brigham Street, with a Mormon meetinghouse on the street and a release-time seminary building across the street from Kirtland Central High School.) There had been a few Mormons who had settled in Fruitland as early as 1878. As of 2000, Fruitland was designated as part of Kirtland for census purposes. Another Mormon settlement of these early days was Waterflow, just west of Fruitland, which appears on maps to this day. A Mormon meetinghouse was dedicated in Kirtland by Heber J. Grant in 1928.

The town incorporated in January 2015, after an 80–40 vote in favor of doing so.

== Geography ==
According to the United States Census Bureau, the town has a total area of 0.670 square miles (1.74 km^{2}), all land.

== Demographics ==
Historical population
Census	Pop.	Note	%±
2020	585		—
U.S. Decennial Census

As of the census of 2000, there were 6,190 people, 1,822 households, and 1,517 families residing in the CDP. The population density was 530.5 inhabitants per square mile (204.8/km^{2}). There were 1,994 housing units at an average density of 170.9 per square mile (66.0/km^{2}). The racial makeup of the CDP was 48.93% Native American, 43.38% White, 0.24% Asian, 0.19% African American, 0.02% Pacific Islander, 4.26% from other races, and 2.97% from two or more races. Hispanic or Latino of any race were 9.45% of the population.

There were 1,822 households, out of which 50.5% had children under the age of 18 living with them, 61.6% were married couples living together, 14.9% had a female householder with no husband present, and 16.7% were non-families. 13.7% of all households were made up of individuals, and 4.7% had someone living alone who was 65 years of age or older. The average household size was 3.40 and the average family size was 3.71.

In the CDP, the population was spread out, with 36.4% under the age of 18, 11.2% from 18 to 24, 27.4% from 25 to 44, 18.9% from 45 to 64, and 6.1% who were 65 years of age or older. The median age was 27 years. For every 100 females, there were 98.0 males. For every 100 females age 18 and over, there were 93.3 males.

The median income for a household in the CDP was $45,000, and the median income for a family was $45,491. Males had a median income of $41,014 versus $21,146 for females. The per capita income for the CDP was $14,053. About 12.5% of families and 14.8% of the population were below the poverty line, including 19.6% of those under age 18 and 9.607% of those age 65 or over.

== Education ==
Central Consolidated Schools serves Kirtland as well as other communities in western San Juan County.

== Notable person ==
- Gertrude Lee, Diné lawyer and politician
