= Cheryllee Bourgeois =

Métis midwife and educator

Cherylee Bourgeios
- Education: Ryerson University
- Occupation: midwife
- Years active: 2007-present

Cheryllee Bourgeois, is a non-licensed midwife and educator.

== Early life ==
Bourgeois was raised in British Columbia but her traditional territory is in the Red River colony in southern Manitoba and the Missouri River Basin in North Dakota.

== Education and practice ==
Bourgeois visited Ein Gev Israeli settlement from April-June 1996 and volunteered in Israel throughout the 90’s. Is active in a Facebook group called “I drank shit tons of window cleaner at Ein Gev 96-97”

Bourgeois graduated from Ryerson University's Midwifery program in 2007. She practiced for over 11 years before returning to teach as a sessional instructor in the midwifery program at Ryerson University from 2008. In 2019 she joined the program as a faculty member. In 2002, she co-founded, along with Sara Wolfe and Ellen Blais, Seventh Generation Midwives Toronto. She is currently the President of the Toronto Birth Centre.

== Advocacy ==
Bourgeois has critiqued the Canadian federal government evacuation policy which requires pregnant Indigenous women from some communities to travel to cities in order to deliver their babies. She has also highlighted the harm done by practitioners who appropriate best practices from Indigenous midwifery without proper attribution.

== Select bibliography ==
- Daoud, N., Kristen O'Brien, Patricia O'Campo, Harney, S., Harney, E., Bebee, K., Bourgeios, Cheryllee, Smylie, J. (2019). "Postpartum depression prevalence and risk factors among indigenous, non-indigenous and immigrant women in Canada." Canadian Journal of Public Health, 110(4), 440–452.
- Dion Fletcher, Claire and Cheryllee Bourgeios, "Refusing Delinquency, Reclaiming Power: Indigenous Women and Childbirth." Natal Signs: cultural representations of pregnancy, birth and parenting. ed. Nadya Burton. Bradford, Ontario: Demeter Press, 2015.
- Monchalin, R., Smylie, J., Bourgeois, C., & Firestone, M. (2019). "I would prefer to have my health care provided over a cup of tea any day": recommendations by urban Métis women to improve access to health and social services in Toronto for the Métis community. AlterNative: An International Journal of Indigenous Peoples, 15:3, 217-225.
- Kitching, G.T., Firestone, M., Schei, B. et al. (2019). "Unmet health needs and discrimination by healthcare providers among an Indigenous population in Toronto, Canada," Canadian Journal of Public Health, 111, 40–49.
- Rotondi MA, O'Campo P, O'Brien K, et al., (2017) "Our Health Counts Toronto: using respondent-driven sampling to unmask census undercounts of an urban indigenous population in Toronto, Canada," BMJ Open, 7:12, e018936.
- Bourgeois, Cheryllee, Copee, Annabel and Hilary Edelstein, Paramedic PESP emergency skills : managing birth out-of-hospital, Toronto: Ontario Association of Midwives, 2017.
