= Shammara Henderson =

American lawyer

Judge of the New Mexico Court of Appeals
- Incumbent
- Assumed office March 1, 2020
- Appointed by: Michelle Lujan Grisham
- Preceded by: M. Monica Zamora

Personal details
- Born: Shammara Haley Henderson; 1982 or 1983 (age 42–43) Albuquerque, New Mexico, U.S.
- Party: Democratic
- Education: American University (BA); University of New Mexico (JD)

Shammara Haley Henderson (born 1982/1983) is an American lawyer and jurist serving as a judge on the New Mexico Court of Appeals. She assumed office on March 1, 2020, the first African-American to serve on the court.

== Early life and education ==
Henderson was born and raised in Albuquerque, New Mexico, where she graduated from Valley High School. She earned a Bachelor of Arts degree in political science and philosophy from American University in 2004, where she received the Frederick Douglass Scholarship and a Juris Doctor from the University of New Mexico School of Law in 2007.

== Career ==
In 2007 and 2008, Henderson served as a clerk for New Mexico Supreme Court Justice Charles W. Daniels. She also served as an assistant district attorney and associate counsel to New Mexico Governor Bill Richardson. Henderson joined the United States Attorney's Office for the District of New Mexico in 2011, serving as an assistant United States attorney until 2017. Henderson developed and presented training and outreach programs across New Mexico for law enforcement, community organizations and churches. She co-founded her own law firm Henderson & Grohman, PC, in 2017 which joined Freedman, Boyd, Hollander, Goldberg, Urias, & Ward, PA in October of 2018. Since 2019, she has also worked as an adjunct professor at the University of New Mexico School of Law. In February 2020, Henderson was appointed to the New Mexico Court of Appeals by Governor Michelle Lujan Grisham, becoming the first African-American to sit on the court.
