= San Juan Regional Medical Center =

Coordinates: 36.7239°N 108.2175°W

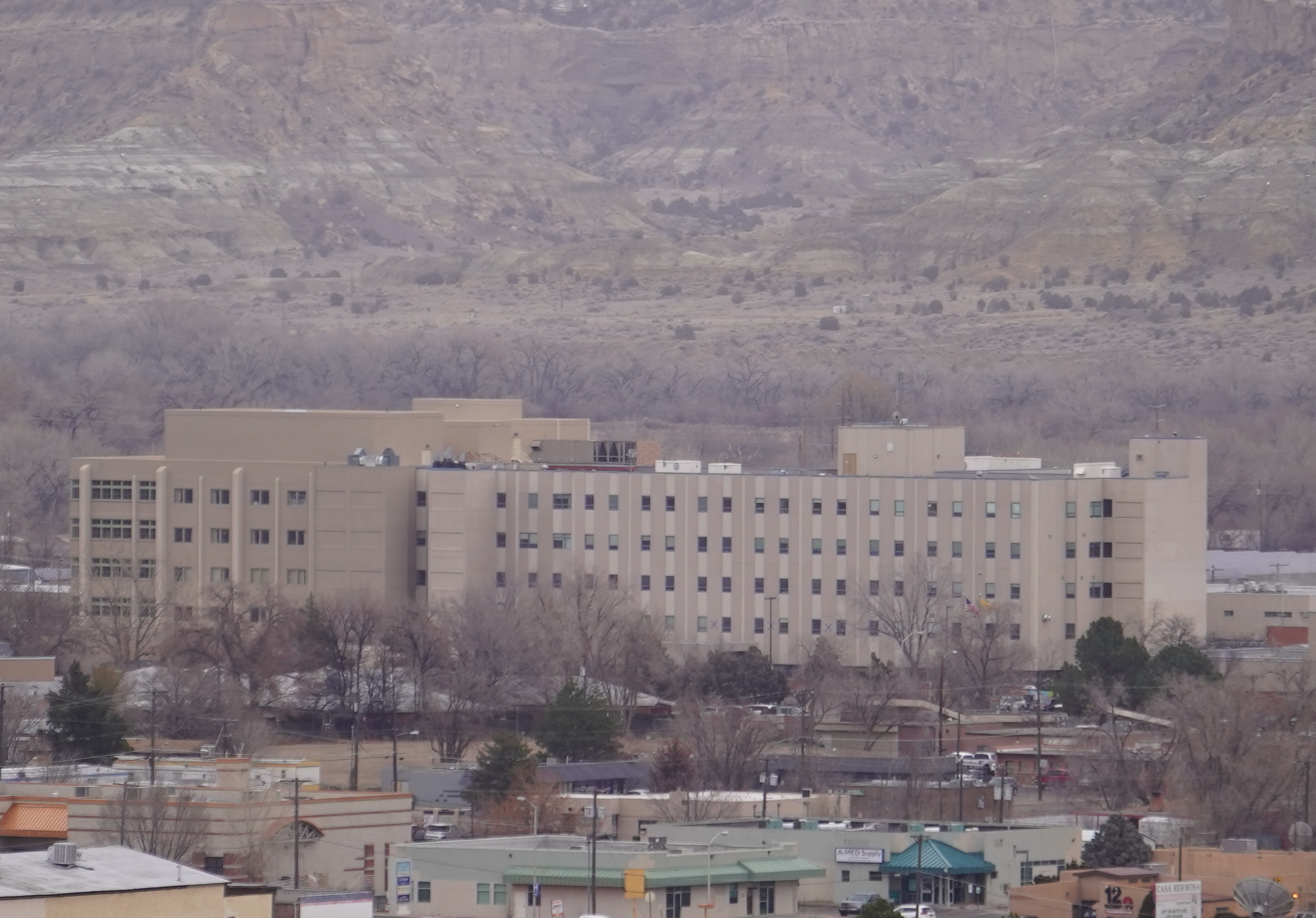

Geography
- Location: 801 W Maple St, Farmington, New Mexico, United States

Services
- Emergency department: Level III trauma center
- Beds: 198

Helipads
- Helipad: Single

History
- Founded: 1910

Links
- Website: www.sanjuanregional.com
- Lists: Hospitals in New Mexico

San Juan Regional Medical Center is a 198 bed, Level III Trauma Center that provides healthcare to the Four Corners region of New Mexico, Arizona, Utah and Colorado, in the United States. In October 2010, SJRMC received a three-year accreditation by Det Norske Veritas (DNV).
