= Fruitland, New Mexico =

Unincorporated community in New Mexico, US

- Unincorporated community
- Location within the state of New Mexico Fruitland (the United States)
- Country: United States
- State: New Mexico
- County: San Juan
- Elevation: 5,135 ft (1,565 m)

Population (2020)
  - Total: 771
- Time zone: UTC-7 (Mountain (MST))
  - Summer (DST): UTC-6 (MDT)
- ZIP codes: 87416
- Area code: 505
- GNIS feature ID: 2813405

Fruitland (Navajo: Bááh Díílid) is an unincorporated community and Census-designated place in San Juan County, New Mexico, United States. As of the 2020 census, Fruitland had a population of 771. The community is on the north side of the San Juan River. It is immediately west of central Kirtland and north across the river from the Navajo Nation and Upper Fruitland. Fruitland is east of Waterflow.

Fruitland shares its name with a geological formation, the Fruitland Formation.

== History ==
The area now known as Fruitland was traditional Navajo territory. This place is called Bááh Díílid in Navajo.

Euro-American settlers were allowed in 1877, and members of the Church of Jesus Christ of Latter-day Saints first settled in the area in 1878 and an organized group of settlers was sent there by the church in 1881 with Luther C. Burnham being prominent among them. Burnham was made bishop of the LDS ward there in 1883, which was named the Burnham Ward. From this time until the 1930s most of the residents called the area Burnham instead of Fruitland.

For a time Brigham Young, Jr. maintained one of his residences at Fruitland.

In 1930 the Burnham Ward had 718 members, including unbaptized children under age eight.

The Young Stake was organized with headquarters at Burnham in 1912. By the 1970s the stake headquarters was Farmington. In 1982 a Kirtland Stake was formed, which today covers from Kirtland west to Shiprock, New Mexico, and beyond.

== Population history ==
Fruitland had about 400 people in 1950 according to the Columbia-Lippincott Gazetteer. Other sources place the population at this point at 200.

== Education ==
It is within Central Consolidated Schools.

Nenahnezad Community School of the Bureau of Indian Education (BIE) is in Nenahnezad and has a Fruitland postal address.

== Notable people ==
- Mamie Deschillie (1920-2010), Navajo artist that had resided in Fruitland and Upper Fruitland
- Brigham Young Jr. (1836-1903), American religious leader who had once resided in Fruitland
