= New Mexico Court of Appeals =

Appellate court in New Mexico, US

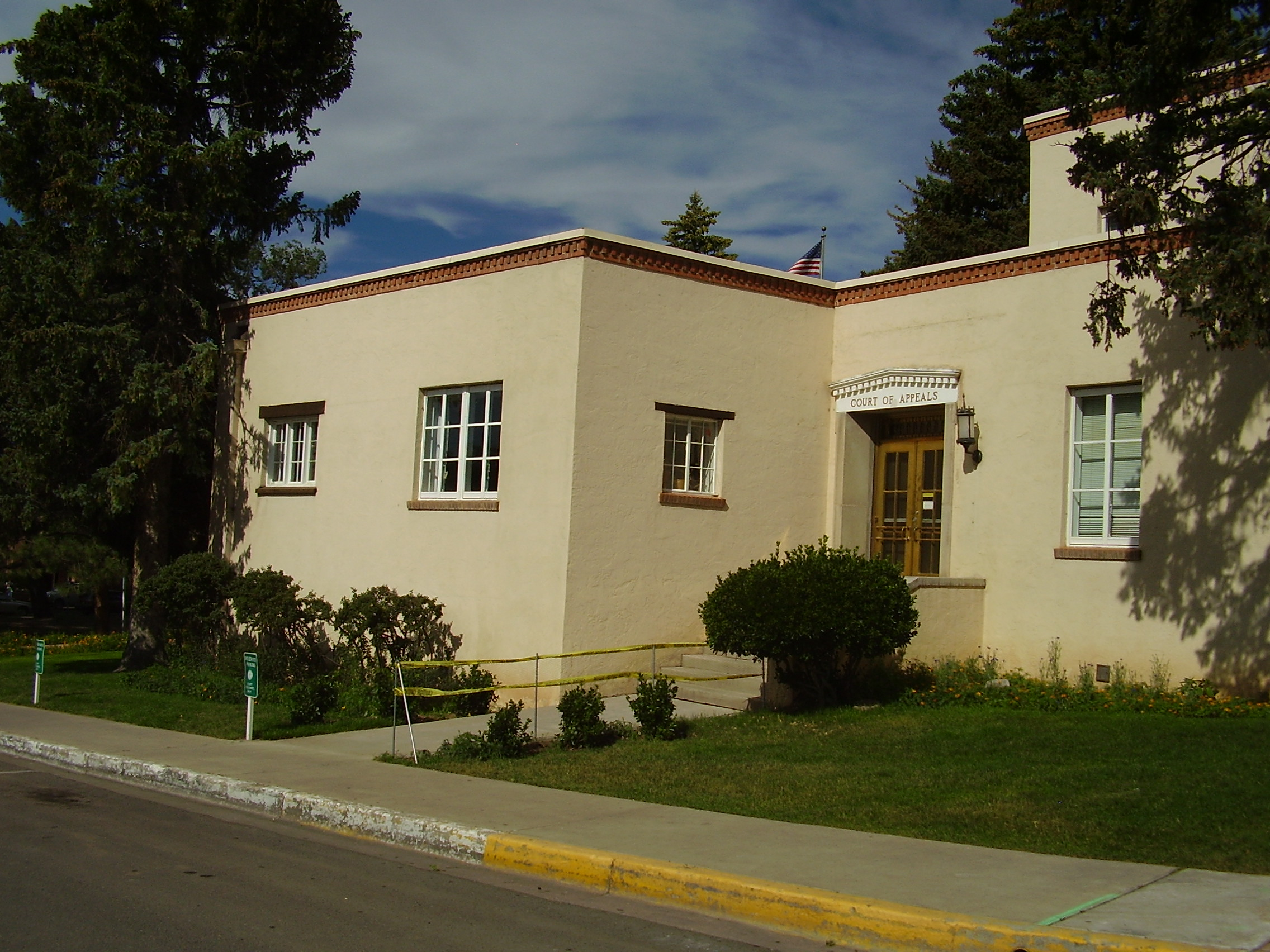
New Mexico Court of Appeals entrance in the Supreme Court Building

The New Mexico Court of Appeals (in case citation, N.M. Ct. App.) is the intermediate-level appellate court for the state of New Mexico.

== History ==
The court of appeals was created by a constitutional amendment submitted to the electorate in a special election held on September 28, 1965. The original enabling legislation established a court consisting of four judges. The court was expanded to five judges in 1972 and seven judges in 1978. In 1991, it was again expanded to ten judges, where it remains today.

== Jurisdiction ==
The court has general appellate jurisdiction over the state district courts and certain state agencies. The only exceptions to this grant of jurisdiction are:

- criminal cases in which the death penalty or life imprisonment is sought,
- Appeals from the Public Regulation Commission, and
- Cases involving the writ of habeas corpus.

These cases are directly reviewed by the New Mexico Supreme Court.

== Composition ==
Ten judges sit on the court, each with their own paralegal and law clerk. However, the Court is moving towards a two-law clerk system.

Name	Born	Start	Term ends (Note: Terms end on December 31.)	Party	Appointer	Law school
Jacqueline Medina, Chief Judge	1964 (age 61–62)	January 1, 2019	2028	Democratic	—N/a (Note: Took office after being elected in a partisan election.)	New Mexico
Miles Hanisee	1967 or 1968 (age 58–59)	December 2012	2034	Republican	Susana Martinez (R)	Pepperdine
Jennifer Attrep	1977 or 1978 (age 48–49)	January 19, 2018	2032	Democratic	Susana Martinez (R)	Virginia
Megan Duffy	September 19, 1979 (age 47)	January 1, 2019	2032	Democratic	—N/a	New Mexico
Zachary Ives	1972 or 1973 (age 53–54)	January 31, 2019	2028	Democratic	Michelle Lujan Grisham (D)	New Mexico
Shammara Henderson	1982 or 1983 (age 43–44)	March 1, 2020	2032	Democratic	Michelle Lujan Grisham (D)	New Mexico
Jane Yohalem	December 30, 1949 (age 76)	July 29, 2020	2030	Democratic	Michelle Lujan Grisham (D)	Columbia
Gerald Baca	February 16, 1962 (age 64)	March 19, 2021	2030	Democratic	Michelle Lujan Grisham (D)	New Mexico
Katherine Wray	1978 or 1979 (age 47–48)	September 23, 2021	2030	Democratic	Michelle Lujan Grisham (D)	New Mexico
Kristopher Houghton	June 15, 1981 (age 45)	August 16, 2025	2034	Democratic	Michelle Lujan Grisham (D)	New Mexico
