= 2018 New Mexico gubernatorial election =

- November 6, 2018
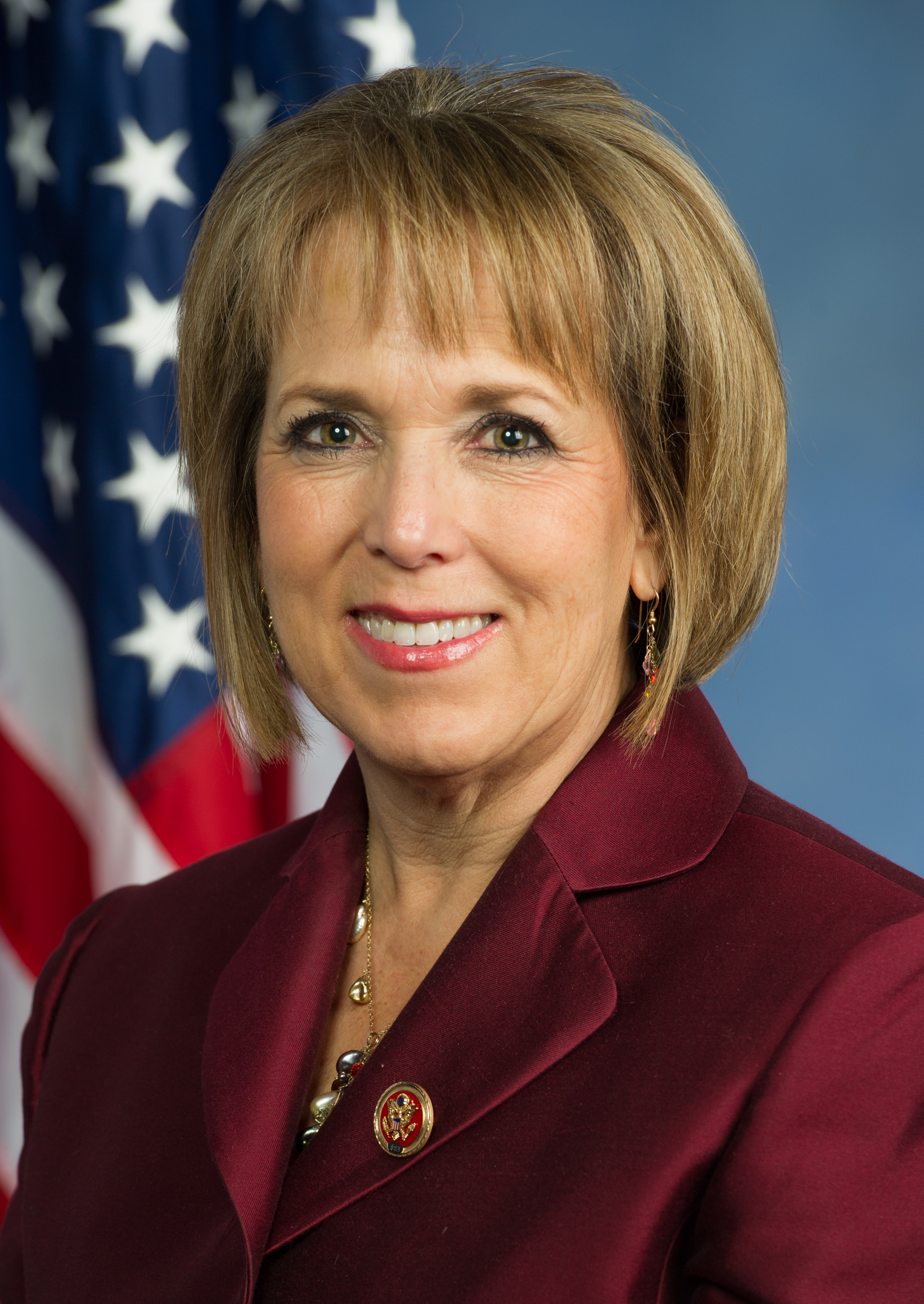

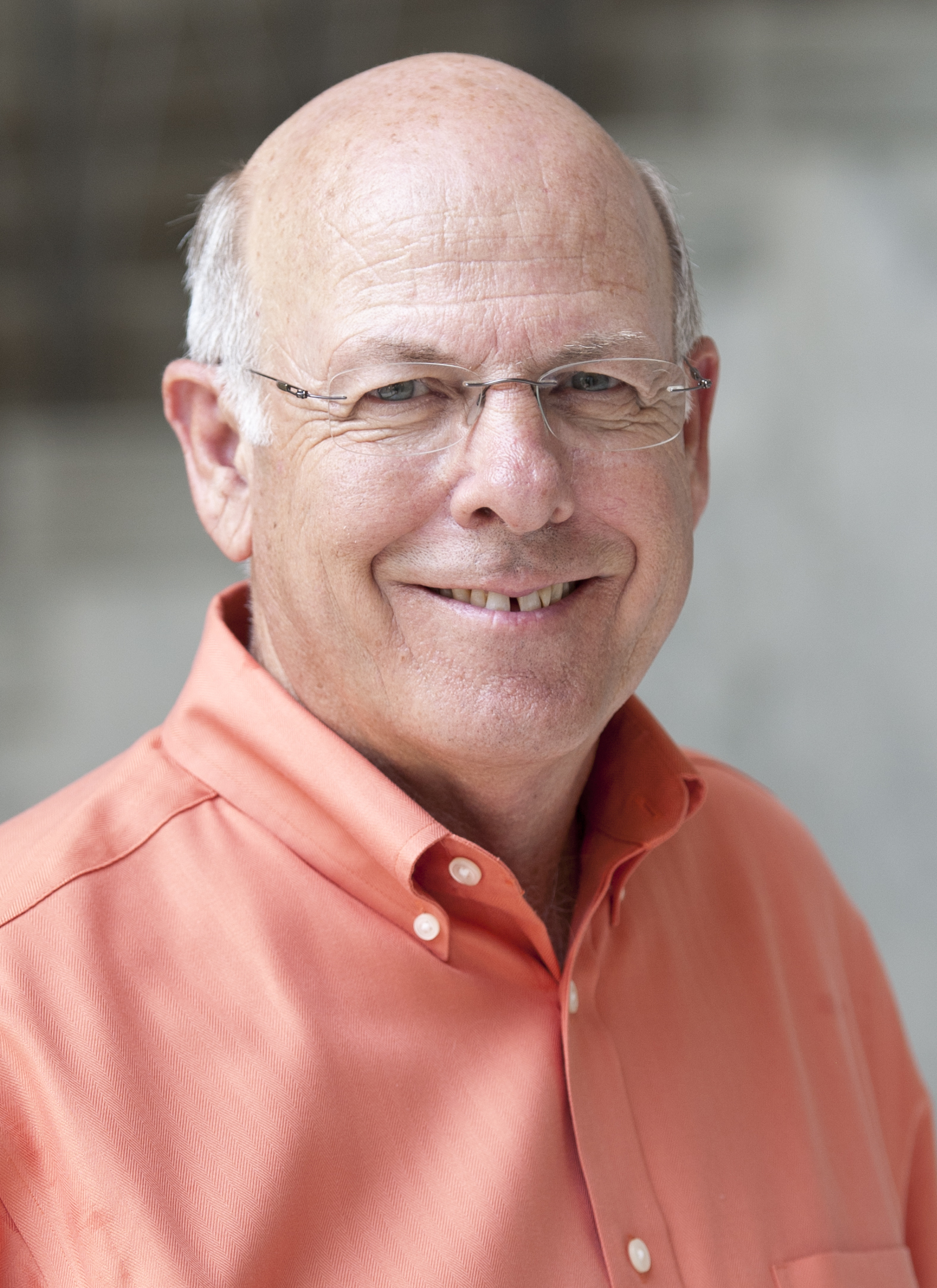
Nominee	Michelle Lujan Grisham	Steve Pearce
Party	Democratic	Republican
Running mate	Howie Morales	Michelle Garcia Holmes
Popular vote	398,368	298,091
Percentage	57.20%	42.80%
- Lujan Grisham: 50–60% 60–70% 70–80% 80–90% >90% Pearce: 50–60% 60–70% 70–80% 80–90% >90% Tie: 50% No data
Governor before election
Susana Martinez
Republican
Elected Governor
Michelle Lujan Grisham
Democratic

The 2018 New Mexico gubernatorial election took place on November 6, 2018, to elect the next governor of New Mexico, concurrently with the election of New Mexico's Class I U.S. Senate seat, as well as other elections to the United States Senate in other states, elections to the United States House of Representatives and various local elections. This was one of eight Republican-held governorships up for election in a state carried by Hillary Clinton in the 2016 presidential election.

Incumbent Republican Governor Susana Martinez was term-limited and could not seek a third consecutive term. Following party primaries on June 5, 2018, U.S. Representative Steve Pearce was the Republican nominee and U.S. Representative Michelle Lujan Grisham was the Democratic nominee. Lujan Grisham won the election by a substantial margin, which in fact was a complete and exact reversal of the 2014 gubernatorial results. Her win also signaled a continuation of the pattern of the partisanship of the office changing every two terms, beginning with Gary Johnson's first election in 1994. Furthermore, the pattern of the partisanship changing with each officeholder was continued, a pattern first started after Toney Anaya left office in 1987. Furthermore, the margin between the candidates (57.2% to 42.8%) was the same as the previous election, albeit with the parties switched.

== Background ==
At the presidential level, New Mexico has begun to trend into a Democratic-leaning swing state. It has gone Democratic in all but one presidential election since 1992. The only break in this trend came in 2004, when George W. Bush won it by less than a point. However, in 2008, Barack Obama won the state over John McCain by 15 points and in 2012 by 10 points over Mitt Romney. In 2016, Democrat Hillary Clinton defeated Republican Donald Trump by eight points.

However, in 2010, then-District Attorney of New Mexico's Third Judicial District Susana Martinez won the election, becoming the first US Latina Governor, over Lieutenant Governor Diane Denish, former running mate of two-term Democrat Bill Richardson, by approximately seven points. In 2014, Martinez was re-elected over state Attorney General Gary King by nearly 15 points. It has been described as one of the Democrats' best chances at a pickup, due to Gov. Martinez's unpopularity and because "she's leaving behind a high unemployment rate and struggling education system."

The 2018 primary election results show 116,311 votes for Democratic candidate Michelle Lujan Grisham and a total of 175,182 for all three Democratic candidates while Republican candidate/nominee Steve Pearce received 74,705; note that 23% of New Mexico's registered voters are third party or independents (280,000), who do not vote in the primary election.

== Republican primary ==
=== Governor ===
==== Candidates ====
===== Nominated =====
- Steve Pearce, U.S. Representative, candidate for the U.S. Senate in 2000 and nominee for the U.S. Senate in 2008

===== Declined =====
- Aubrey Dunn Jr., New Mexico Commissioner of Public Lands and candidate for NM-02 in 2008
- John Sanchez, lieutenant governor and nominee for governor of New Mexico in 2002

==== Results ====
Republican primary results
Party	Candidate	Votes	%
Republican	Steve Pearce	75,162	100.00%
Total votes		75,162	100.00%

=== Lieutenant governor ===
==== Candidates ====
===== Declared =====
- Michelle Garcia Holmes, former chief of staff to Attorney General Gary King, former police detective and candidate for mayor of Albuquerque in 2017

===== Withdrew =====
- Kelly Zunie, former secretary of the New Mexico Indian Affairs Department

===== Declined =====
- Ted Barela, former state senator
- Mark Moores, state senator
- Cliff Pirtle, state senator

==== Results ====
Republican primary results
Party	Candidate	Votes	%
Republican	Michelle Garcia Holmes	67,681	100.00%
Total votes		67,681	100.00%

== Democratic primary ==
=== Governor ===
==== Candidates ====
===== Nominated =====
- Michelle Lujan Grisham, U.S. Representative

===== Eliminated in primary =====
- Jeff Apodaca, businessman and son of former governor Jerry Apodaca
- Joe Cervantes, state senator

===== Declined =====
- Hector Balderas, Attorney General (running for re-election)
- Javier Gonzales, former mayor of Santa Fe (running for lieutenant governor)
- Martin Heinrich, U.S. senator (running for reelection)
- Tim Keller, mayor of Albuquerque and former State Auditor
- Ben Ray Luján, U.S. Representative
- Tom Udall, U.S. Senator
- Alan Webber, mayor of Santa Fe and candidate for governor in 2014

==== Endorsements ====
Jeff Apodaca

Local and state politicians

- Guadalupe Cano, Silver City Town Councilor
- Marco Lucero, Los Alamos County Sheriff

Individuals

- Sam Donaldson, retired news anchor, serving with ABC News 1967–2013
- Lilly Ledbetter, namesake of the Lilly Ledbetter Fair Pay Act of 2009
- Mary Molina Mescall, former executive director of the New Mexico Commission on the Status of Women
- Frances Ray, former president of the Democratic Women of Bernalillo County

==== Polling ====
Poll source	Date(s) administered	Sample size (Note: Key: A – all adults RV – registered voters LV – likely voters V – unclear)	Margin of error	Jeff Apodaca	Joe Cervantes	Michelle Lujan Grisham	Other	Undecided
Research & Polling, Inc.	May 20–24, 2018	444 (LV)	± 4.6%	15%	9%	57%	–	19%
GQR Research (D) (Note: Poll conducted for Lujan Grisham's campaign.)	February 14–19, 2018	400 (LV)	± 4.9%	13%	6%	72%	2% (Note: Peter DeBenedittis with 2%)	6%
GQR Research (D) (Note: Poll conducted for The Majority Institute, a research and strategy hub affiliated with the Democratic Party.)	October 12–18, 2017	446 (LV)	± 4.6%	10%	3%	75%	2%	10%

==== Results ====
Results by county: Lujan Grisham—70–80% Lujan Grisham—60–70% Lujan Grisham—50–60% Lujan Grisham—40–50% Apodaca—40–50%

Democratic primary results
Party	Candidate	Votes	%
Democratic	Michelle Lujan Grisham	116,754	66.38%
Democratic	Jeff Apodaca	38,975	22.16%
Democratic	Joe Cervantes	20,169	11.47%
Total votes		175,898	100.00%

=== Lieutenant governor ===
==== Candidates ====
===== Declared =====
- Billy Garrett, Doña Ana County Commissioner
- Rick Miera, former Majority Leader of the New Mexico House of Representatives
- Howie Morales, state senator and candidate for governor in 2014

===== Withdrew =====
- Jeff Carr, retired teacher and former New Mexico Public Education Commissioner
- Javier Gonzales, former mayor of Santa Fe
- David McTeigue, juvenile probation officer
- Michael Padilla, state senator

===== Declined =====
- Brian Colón, former chairman of the Democratic Party of New Mexico, nominee for lieutenant governor in 2010 and candidate for mayor of Albuquerque in 2017 (running for State Auditor)
- Bill O'Neill, state senator

==== Results ====
Results by county: Morales—80–90% Morales—70–80% Morales—60–70% Morales—50–60% Morales—40–50% Morales—30–40% Miera—40–50% Garrett—40–50% Tie–30–40%

Democratic primary results
Party	Candidate	Votes	%
Democratic	Howie Morales	75,828	47.10%
Democratic	Rick Miera	51,202	31.81%
Democratic	Billy Garrett	33,949	21.09%
Total votes		160,979	100.00%

== Libertarian primary ==
Based on the party's voter registration numbers and presidential nominee Gary Johnson's result in 2016, the Libertarian Party holds major-party status in New Mexico. Under New Mexico law, both gubernatorial and lieutenant governor candidates must receive each at least 230 signatures from registered Libertarian voters to formally receive the nomination and be placed on the ballot as the Libertarian nominees. Both Walsh and Dunn failed to meet that requirement and were not on the ballot.

=== Governor ===
==== Candidates ====
===== Declared =====
- Bob Walsh, retired mathematician

===== Declined =====
- Aubrey Dunn, Jr., Commissioner of Public Lands (ran for the U.S. Senate, but dropped out)
- Gary Johnson, former Republican governor and nominee for president in 2012 and 2016 (running for the U.S. Senate)

==== Results ====
Libertarian primary results
Party	Candidate	Votes	%
Libertarian	Bob Walsh (write-in)	175	100.00%
Total votes		175	100.00%

=== Lieutenant governor ===
==== Candidates ====
===== Declared =====
- Robin Dunn, wife of Aubrey Dunn, Jr.

==== Results ====
Libertarian primary results
Party	Candidate	Votes	%
Libertarian	Robin Dunn (write-in)	177	100.00%
Total votes		177	100.00%

== General election ==
=== Endorsements ===
Steve Pearce (R)

Federal officials

- Mike Pence, vice president of the United States

Sheriffs

- Louis Burkhard, Valencia County
- Mark Cage, Eddy County
- Ken Christesen, San Juan County
- Ian Fletcher, Catron County
- Gary Gold, San Miguel County (Democratic)
- Glenn Hamilton, Sierra County
- Elva Harvey, De Baca County (Democratic)
- Corey Helton, Lea County
- Benny House, Otero County
- Marco Lucero, Los Alamos County (Democratic)
- Mike Lucero, Guadalupe County (Democratic)
- Tony Mace, Cibola County (Democratic)
- Malin Parker, Roosevelt County
- Russell Shafer, Quay County
- Robert Shepperd, Lincoln County
- Rick Sinclair, Colfax County
- Britt Snyder, Chaves County
- Warren Walter, Hidalgo County
- Wesley Waller, Curry County
- Heath White, Torrance County
- Doug Wood, Sandoval County

County commissioners

- Glen Duggins, Socorro County

Individuals

- Jerry Apodaca, former Democratic governor of New Mexico, 1975–1979
- Martin Hicks, mayor of Grants (Democratic)
- Ronna Romney McDaniel, chair of the RNC

Organizations

- Albuquerque Police Officers Association
- National Rifle Association of America
- Right To Life Committee of New Mexico
- Susan B. Anthony List

Newspapers

- Albuquerque Journal
Michelle Lujan Grisham (D)

Federal officials

- Joe Biden, former vice president of the United States
- Barack Obama, former president of the United States

U.S senators

- Jeff Bingaman, former U.S. Senator (D-NM)
- Martin Heinrich, U.S. Senator (D-NM)
- Elizabeth Warren, U.S. Senator (D-MA)

U.S. representatives

- Gwen Graham, former U.S. Representative

Local and state politicians

- Eliseo Lee Alcon, state representative
- Deborah Armstrong, state representative
- Hector Balderas, Attorney General of New Mexico
- Patricia Roybal Caballero, state representative
- Jacob Candelaria, state senator
- Gail Chasey, state representative
- Carlos Cisneros, state senator
- George Dodge Jr., state representative
- Daymon Ely, state representative
- Harry Garcia, state representative
- Miguel Garcia, state representative
- Deb Haaland, former chair of the New Mexico Democratic Party
- Jay Inslee, governor of Washington
- Timothy Jennings, former State Senate President Pro-Tempore
- D. Wonda Johnson, state representative
- Tim Keller, mayor of Albuquerque
- Derrick Lente, state representative
- Georgene Louis, state representative
- Anthony "Moe" Maestas, state representative
- Javier Martínez, state representative
- Cisco McSorley, state senator
- John Pinto, state senator
- Stephanie Garcia Richard, state representative
- Nancy Rodriguez, state senator
- Angelica Rubio, state representative
- Nick Salazar, state representative
- Michael S. Sanchez, former State Senate Majority Leader
- Debra Sariñana, state representative
- William Soules, state senator
- Liz Stefanics, state senator
- Bill Tallman, state senator
- Christine Trujillo, state representative
- Jim Trujillo, state representative
- Linda Trujillo, state representative'
- Alan Webber, mayor of Santa Fe and candidate for governor in 2014

Individuals

- Chelsea Handler, actress
- Alyssa Milano, actress and activist
- Edward L. Romero, former United States Ambassador to Spain and Andorra (1998-2001)
- Kipp Watson, owner of Rio Rancho Road Runners, LLC, which promotes wheelchair basketball
- Cheryl L. Willman, M.D., University of New Mexico School of Medicine Distinguished Professor

Labor unions

- American Federation of State, County and Municipal Employees Council 18
- American Federation of Teachers - New Mexico
- Bakery, Confectionery, Tobacco Workers and Grain Millers' International Union Local 351
- International Association of Fire Fighters Local 224
- New Mexico Professional Fire Fighters Association
- United Mine Workers of America
- United Steelworkers District 12

Organizations

- Conservation Voters New Mexico Action Fund
- EMILY's List
- Everytown for Gun Safety
- Latino Victory Fund
- NARAL Pro-Choice America
- Planned Parenthood Action Fund

=== Debates ===
- Complete video of debate, September 19, 2018

=== Predictions ===
Source	Ranking	As of
The Cook Political Report	Lean D (flip)	October 26, 2018
The Washington Post	Lean D (flip)	November 5, 2018
FiveThirtyEight	Likely D (flip)	November 5, 2018
Rothenberg Political Report	Lean D (flip)	November 1, 2018
Sabato's Crystal Ball	Lean D (flip)	November 5, 2018
RealClearPolitics	Lean D (flip)	November 4, 2018
Daily Kos	Lean D (flip)	November 5, 2018
Fox News (Note: The Fox News Midterm Power Rankings uniquely does not contain a category for Safe/Solid races)	Lean D (flip)	November 5, 2018
Politico	Likely D (flip)	November 5, 2018
Governing	Lean D (flip)	November 5, 2018

=== Polling ===
View source data.

Poll source	Date(s) administered	Sample size	Margin of error	Steve Pearce (R)	Michelle Lujan Grisham (D)	Undecided
Research Co.	November 1–3, 2018	450 (V)	± 4.6%	41%	53%	6%
Research & Polling, Inc.	October 26 – November 1, 2018	993 (LV)	± 3.1%	43%	53%	4%
Carroll Strategies	October 29, 2018	1,200 (LV)	± 2.8%	45%	51%	4%
Emerson College	October 24–26, 2018	936 (LV)	± 3.4%	44%	53%	4%
GQR Research (D)	October 22–26, 2018	600 (LV)	± 4.0%	44%	53%	4%
Pacific Market Research	October 19–24, 2018	400 (LV)	± 4.9%	39%	48%	13%
NSON Opinion Strategy (L) (Note: Poll conducted for the Elect Liberty PAC, an organization dedicated to promoting Libertarian candidates.)	September 20–24, 2018	932 (LV)	–	40%	44%	16%
Research & Polling, Inc.	September 7–13, 2018	966 (LV)	± 3.1%	43%	50%	–
Global Strategy Group (D) (Note: Poll conducted for Hector Balderas, the incumbent New Mexico Attorney General.)	August 27–30, 2018	601 (LV)	± 4.0%	42%	52%	5%
GQR Research (D)	August 18–22, 2018	600 (LV)	± 4.0%	44%	52%	–
Emerson College	August 17–18, 2018	500 (RV)	± 4.6%	40%	42%	18%
The Tarrance Group (R) (Note: Poll conducted for Pearce's campaign.)	April 9–12, 2018	608 (LV)	± 4.1%	45%	47%	8%
The Tarrance Group (R)	May 20–23, 2017	605 (RV)	± 4.1%	43%	47%	10%

Hypothetical polling

Poll source	Date(s) administered	Sample size	Margin of error	Steve Pearce (R)	Michelle Lujan Grisham (D)	Bob Walsh (L)	Undecided
NSON Opinion Strategy (L)	July 2018	500 (LV)	–	37%	44%	7%	11%
SurveyUSA	June 19–23, 2018	535 (LV)	± 5.0%	38%	51%	3%	8%
Carroll Strategies	June 15–16, 2018	1,199 (LV)	± 2.8%	42%	51%	3%	4%

=== Results ===
2018 New Mexico gubernatorial election
Party	Candidate	Votes	%	±%
Democratic	Michelle Lujan Grisham	398,368	57.20%	+14.42%
Republican	Steve Pearce	298,091	42.80%	−14.42%
Majority		100,277	14.40%	
Total votes		696,459	100.00%	
Democratic gain from Republican		Swing	+28.84%	

==== By county ====
County	Michelle Lujan Grisham Democratic		Steve Pearce Republican		Margin		Total votes cast
County	#	%	#	%	#	%	Total votes cast
Bernalillo	149,480	62.10%	91,221	37.90%	58,259	24.20%	240,701
Catron	511	27.73%	1,332	72.27%	-821	-44.55%	1,843
Chaves	5,348	32.02%	11,352	67.98%	-6,004	-35.95%	16,700
Cibola	3,988	55.94%	3,141	44.06%	847	11.88%	7,129
Colfax	2,327	49.91%	2,335	50.09%	-8	-0.17%	4,662
Curry	3,106	30.41%	7,107	69.59%	-4,001	-39.18%	10,213
De Baca	229	28.06%	587	71.94%	-358	-43.87%	816
Doña Ana	36,954	60.64%	23,985	39.36%	12,969	21.28%	60,939
Eddy	4,631	29.29%	11,178	70.71%	-6,547	-41.41%	15,809
Grant	7,043	59.72%	4,750	40.28%	2,293	19.44%	11,793
Guadalupe	1,021	60.27%	673	39.73%	348	20.54%	1,694
Harding	178	37.24%	300	62.76%	-122	-25.52%	478
Hidalgo	785	48.25%	842	51.75%	-57	-3.50%	1,627
Lea	3,086	22.15%	10,845	77.85%	-7,759	-55.70%	13,931
Lincoln	2,625	33.48%	5,216	66.52%	-2,591	-33.04%	7,841
Los Alamos	6,005	58.61%	4,240	41.39%	1,765	17.23%	10,245
Luna	2,967	48.30%	3,176	51.70%	-209	-3.40%	6,143
McKinley	13,117	71.46%	5,238	28.54%	7,879	42.93%	18,355
Mora	1,664	71.05%	678	28.95%	986	42.10%	2,342
Otero	6,450	37.73%	10,644	62.27%	-4,194	-24.53%	17,094
Quay	1,144	37.03%	1,945	62.97%	-801	-25.93%	3,089
Rio Arriba	9,352	73.00%	3,459	27.00%	5,893	46.00%	12,811
Roosevelt	1,430	30.74%	3,222	69.26%	-1,792	-38.52%	4,652
San Juan	13,347	35.78%	23,961	64.22%	-10,614	-28.45%	37,308
San Miguel	7,001	75.78%	2,238	24.22%	4,763	51.55%	9,239
Sandoval	30,425	55.09%	24,803	44.91%	5,622	10.18%	55,228
Santa Fe	52,692	78.54%	14,394	21.46%	38,298	57.09%	67,086
Sierra	1,880	39.81%	2,843	60.19%	-963	-20.39%	4,723
Socorro	3,596	57.44%	2,664	42.56%	932	14.89%	6,260
Taos	11,806	81.46%	2,687	18.54%	9,119	62.92%	14,493
Torrance	2,048	38.17%	3,317	61.83%	-1,269	-23.65%	5,365
Union	415	28.15%	1,059	71.85%	-644	-43.69%	1,474
Valencia	11,717	48.07%	12,659	51.93%	-942	-3.86%	24,376
Total	398,368	57.20%	298,091	42.80%	100,277	14.40%	696,459

Counties that flipped from Republican to Democratic

- Bernalillo (largest city: Albuquerque)
- Cibola (largest city: Grants)
- Doña Ana (largest city: Las Cruces)
- Grant (largest city: Silver City)
- Guadalupe (largest city: Santa Rosa)
- Los Alamos (largest city: Los Alamos)
- McKinley (largest city: Gallup)
- Sandoval (largest city: Rancho)
- Socorro (largest city: Socorro)

==== By congressional district ====
Grisham won two of three congressional districts, with Pearce winning the remaining one, which elected a Democrat.

District	Pearce	Lujan Grisham	Representative
1st	39%	61%	Michelle Lujan Grisham
1st	39%	61%	Deb Haaland
2nd	53%	47%	Steve Pearce
2nd	53%	47%	Xochitl Torres Small
3rd	39%	61%	Ben Ray Luján

== See also ==
- New Mexico elections, 2018

== Notes ==
Partisan clients
