= 2018 New Mexico elections =

- November 6, 2018

A general election was held in the U.S. state of New Mexico on November 6, 2018. All of New Mexico's executive officers were up for election, as well as a United States Senate seat, and all of New Mexico's three seats in the United States House of Representatives.

== Governor ==
Incumbent Republican governor Susana Martinez was term-limited and could not run for election to a third consecutive term.

=== Results ===
New Mexico gubernatorial election, 2018
Party	Candidate	Votes	%
Democratic	Michelle Lujan Grisham/Howie Morales	396,603	57.2
Republican	Steve Pearce/Michelle Holmes	297,185	42.8
Total votes		693,788	100.0
Democratic gain from Republican			

== Attorney General ==
New Mexico Attorney General election, 2018
- November 6, 2018
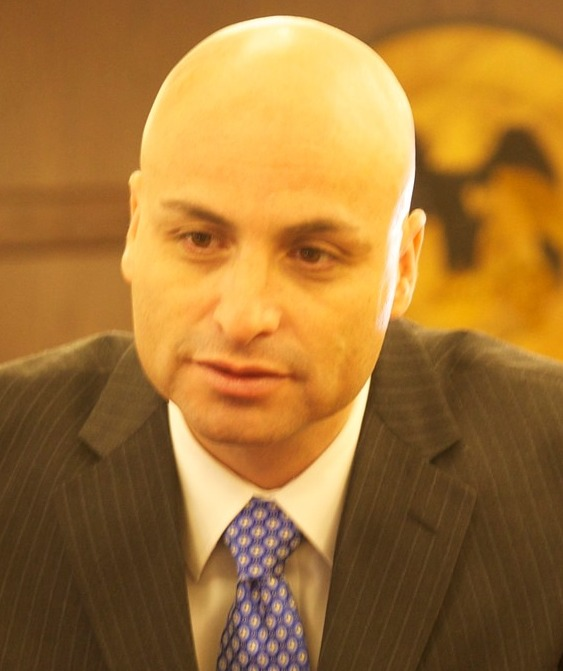

Nominee	Hector Balderas	Michael Hendricks
Party	Democratic	Republican
Popular vote	427,583	231,296
Percentage	61.8%	33.4%
- Balderas: 40–50% 50–60% 60–70% 70–80% 80–90% >90% Hendricks: 40–50% 50–60% 60–70% 70–80% 80–90% >90% Tie: 40–50% 50% No data
Attorney General before election
Hector Balderas
Democratic
Elected Attorney General
Hector Balderas
Democratic

Incumbent Democratic attorney general Hector Balderas ran for re-election to a second term.

=== Democratic primary ===
==== Candidates ====
===== Declared =====
- Hector Balderas, incumbent attorney general of New Mexico

==== Results ====
Democratic primary results
Party	Candidate	Votes	%
Democratic	Hector Balderas (incumbent)	150,515	100.0
Total votes		150,515	100.0

=== Republican primary ===
==== Candidates ====
===== Declared =====
- Michael Hendricks, immigration attorney

==== Results ====
Republican primary results
Party	Candidate	Votes	%
Republican	Michael Hendricks	66,588	100.0
Total votes		66,588	100.0

=== Libertarian primary ===
==== Candidates ====
===== Declared =====
- A. Blair Dunn, attorney and son of Public Lands Commissioner Aubrey Dunn Jr.

==== Results ====
Libertarian primary results
Party	Candidate	Votes	%
Libertarian	A. Blair Dunn	608	100.0
Total votes		608	100.0

=== General election ===
==== Predictions ====
Source	Ranking	As of
Governing	Safe D	October 26, 2018

==== Polling ====
Poll source	Date(s) administered	Sample size	Margin of error	Hector Balderas (D)	Michael Hendricks (R)	A. Blair Dunn (L)	Undecided
Carroll Strategies	October 29, 2018	1,200	± 2.8%	61%	34%	3%	3%
Global Strategy Group (D) (Note: Poll conducted for Hector Balderas.)	August 27–30, 2018	601	± 4.0%	51%	30%	7%	12%
Carroll Strategies	June 15–16, 2018	1,199	± 2.8%	55%	33%	5%	7%

==== Results ====
New Mexico Attorney General election, 2018
Party	Candidate	Votes	%	±%
Democratic	Hector Balderas (incumbent)	427,583	61.81%	+3.54%
Republican	Michael Hendricks	231,296	33.43%	−8.30%
Libertarian	A. Blair Dunn	32,931	4.76%	N/A
Total votes		691,810	100.0%	
Democratic hold				

== Secretary of State ==
New Mexico Secretary of State election, 2018
- November 6, 2018
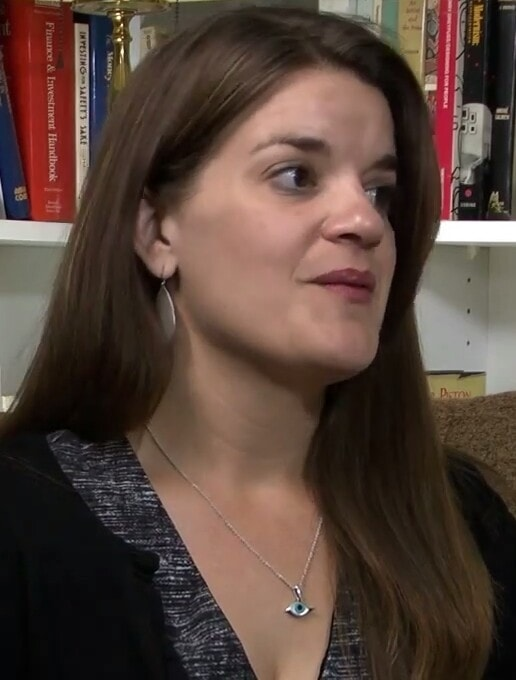

Nominee	Maggie Toulouse Oliver	Gavin Clarkson	Ginger Grider
Party	Democratic	Republican	Libertarian
Popular vote	399,134	257,306	34,527
Percentage	57.8%	37.2%	5.0%
- Oliver: 50–60% 60–70% 70–80% 80–90% Clarkson: 40–50% 50–60% 60–70% 70–80%
Secretary of States before election
Maggie Toulouse Oliver
Democratic
Elected Secretary of States
Maggie Toulouse Oliver
Democratic

Incumbent Democratic secretary of state Maggie Toulouse Oliver, who was elected in the 2016 special election, ran for re-election to a full term in 2018.

For the general election, Governing magazine projected the race as "leans Democratic".

=== Democratic primary ===
==== Candidates ====
===== Declared =====
- Maggie Toulouse Oliver, incumbent secretary of state

==== Results ====
Democratic primary results
Party	Candidate	Votes	%
Democratic	Maggie Toulouse Oliver (incumbent)	148,545	100.0
Total votes		148,545	100.0

=== Republican primary ===
After winning the primary, Cox decided to withdraw from the race. As a result, the New Mexico Republican Party chose Gavin Clarkson as their nominee.

==== Candidates ====
===== Nominee =====
- Gavin Clarkson, former professor at New Mexico State University and former deputy assistant secretary of the U.S. Department of Interior

===== Withdrew =====
- JoHanna Cox, attorney

==== Results ====
Republican primary results
Party	Candidate	Votes	%
Republican	JoHanna Cox	67,041	100.0
Total votes		67,041	100.0

=== Libertarian primary ===
Jeff was replaced as the Libertarian nominee by Ginger Grider after withdrawing from the race.

==== Candidates ====
===== Nominee =====
- Ginger Grider, medical cannabis advocate

===== Withdrew =====
- Sandra Jeff, former Democratic state representative (2009–2015)

==== Results ====
Libertarian primary results
Party	Candidate	Votes	%
Libertarian	Sandra Jeff	604	100.0
Total votes		604	100.0

=== General election ===
==== Predictions ====
Source	Ranking	As of
Governing magazine	Lean D	June 4, 2018

==== Polling ====
Poll source	Date(s) administered	Sample size	Margin of error	Maggie Toulouse Oliver (D)	Gavin Clarkson (R)	Ginger Grider (L)	Undecided
Carroll Strategies	October 29, 2018	1,200	± 2.8%	52%	40%	3%	5%

Hypothetical polling

Poll source	Date(s) administered	Sample size	Margin of error	Maggie Toulouse Oliver (D)	JoHanna Cox (R)	Sandra Jeff (L)	Undecided
Carroll Strategies	June 15–16, 2018	1,199	± 2.8%	52%	29%	6%	14%

==== Results ====
New Mexico Secretary of State election, 2018
Party	Candidate	Votes	%	±%
Democratic	Maggie Toulouse Oliver (incumbent)	399,134	57.76%	+1.17%
Republican	Gavin Clarkson	257,306	37.24%	–6.17%
Libertarian	Ginger Grider	34,527	5.00%	N/A
Total votes		690,967	100.0	
Democratic hold				

== Treasurer ==
New Mexico Treasurer election, 2018
- November 6, 2018
Nominee	Tim Eichenberg	Arthur Castillo
Party	Democratic	Republican
Popular vote	394,780	286,822
Percentage	57.9%	42.1%
- Eichenberg: 50–60% 60–70% 70–80% Castillo: 50–60% 60–70% 70–80%
Treasurer before election
Tim Eichenberg
Democratic
Elected Treasurer
Tim Eichenberg
Democratic

Incumbent Democratic state treasurer Tim Eichenberg ran for re-election to a second term.

=== Democratic primary ===
==== Candidates ====
===== Declared =====
- Tim Eichenberg, incumbent state treasurer

==== Results ====
Democratic primary results
Party	Candidate	Votes	%
Democratic	Tim Eichenberg (incumbent)	141,227	100.0
Total votes		141,227	100.0

=== Republican primary ===
==== Candidates ====
===== Declared =====
- Arthur L. Castillo, former CFO for the New Mexico State Treasurer's Office

==== Results ====
Republican primary results
Party	Candidate	Votes	%
Republican	Arthur L. Castillo	65,813	100.0
Total votes		65,813	100.0

=== General election ===
==== Polling ====
Poll source	Date(s) administered	Sample size	Margin of error	Tim Eichenberg (D)	Arthur Castillo (R)	Undecided
Carroll Strategies	October 29, 2018	1,200	± 2.8%	52%	40%	9%
Carroll Strategies	June 15–16, 2018	1,199	± 2.8%	47%	37%	16%

==== Results ====
New Mexico State Treasurer election, 2018
Party	Candidate	Votes	%	±%
Democratic	Tim Eichenberg (incumbent)	394,780	57.92%	+5.46%
Republican	Arthur L. Castillo	286,822	42.08%	−5.46%
Total votes		681,602	100.0%	
Democratic hold				

== Auditor ==
New Mexico Auditor election, 2018
- November 6, 2018
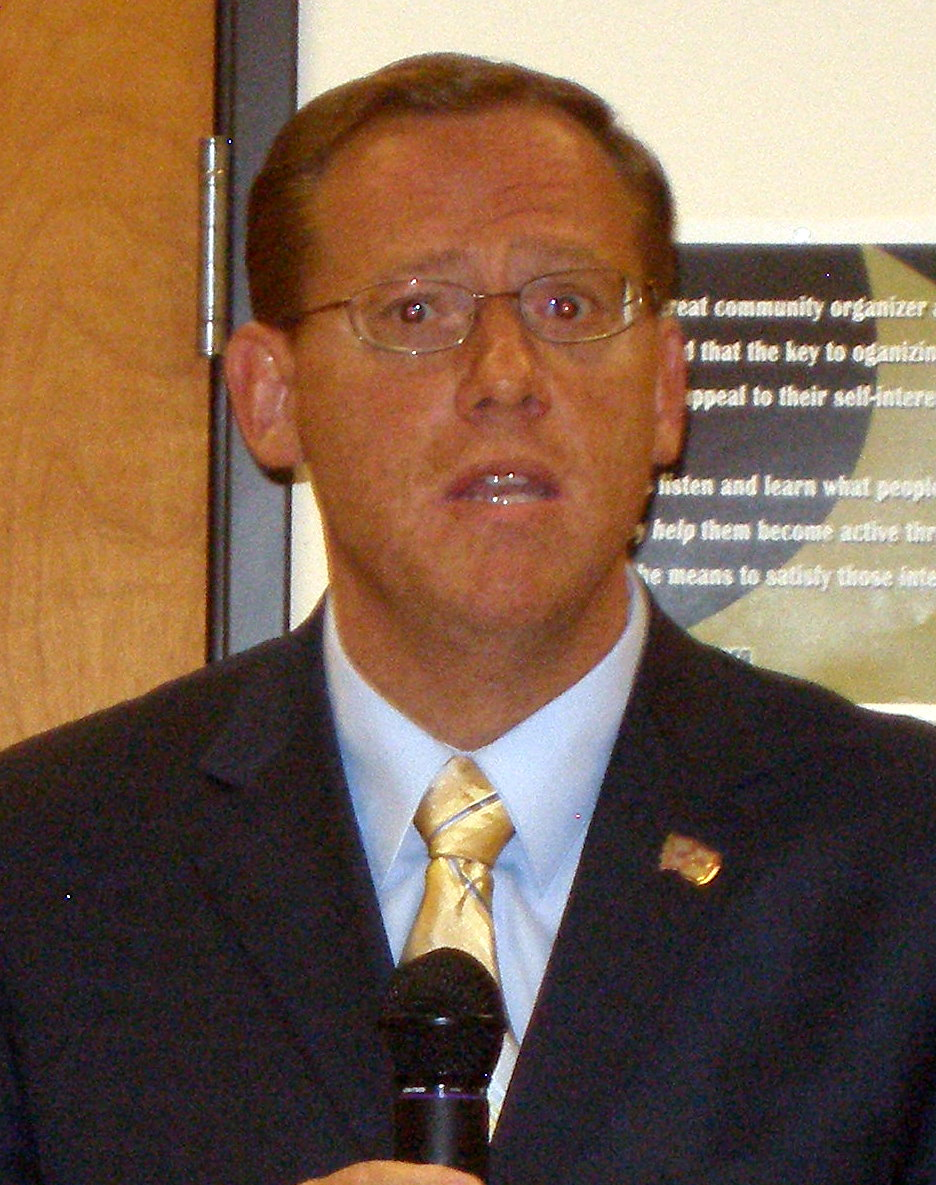

Nominee	Brian Colón	Wayne Johnson
Party	Democratic	Republican
Popular vote	395,691	291,702
Percentage	57.6%	42.4%
- Colón: 50–60% 60–70% 70–80% 80–90% Johnson: 50–60% 60–70% 70–80%
Auditor before election
Wayne Johnson
Republican
Elected Auditor
Brian Colón
Democratic

After incumbent Democratic state auditor Tim Keller was elected mayor of Albuquerque in the 2017 election, and resigned to take office, Governor Martinez appointed Bernalillo County Commissioner Wayne Johnson (R) to be the new state auditor.

=== Republican primary ===
==== Candidates ====
===== Declared =====
- Wayne A. Johnson, incumbent state auditor

==== Results ====
Republican primary results
Party	Candidate	Votes	%
Republican	Wayne A. Johnson (incumbent)	68,267	100.0
Total votes		68,267	100.0

=== Democratic primary ===
==== Candidates ====
===== Declared =====
- Brian Colón, chair of the New Mexico Democratic Party
- Bill McCamley, state representative

==== Results ====
Democratic primary results
Party	Candidate	Votes	%
Democratic	Brian S. Colón	100,949	62.5
Democratic	Bill McCamley	60,464	37.5
Total votes		161,413	100.0

=== General election ===
==== Polling ====
Poll source	Date(s) administered	Sample size	Margin of error	Brian Colón (D)	Wayne Johnson (R)	Undecided
Carroll Strategies	October 29, 2018	1,200	± 2.8%	50%	45%	5%
Carroll Strategies	June 15–16, 2018	1,199	± 2.8%	50%	38%	12%

==== Results ====
New Mexico State Auditor election, 2018
Party	Candidate	Votes	%	±%
Democratic	Brian Colón	395,691	57.56%	+3.31%
Republican	Wayne A. Johnson (incumbent)	291,702	42.44%	−3.31%
Total votes		687,393	100.0%	
Democratic gain from Republican				

== Commissioner of Public Lands ==
New Mexico Commissioner of Public Lands election, 2018
- November 6, 2018
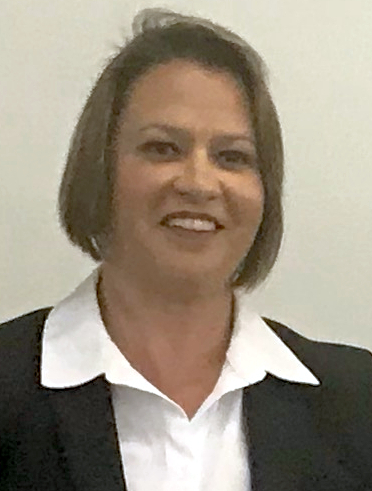

Nominee	Stephanie Garcia Richard	Patrick H. Lyons	Michael Lucero
Party	Democratic	Republican	Libertarian
Popular vote	352,335	297,379	39,791
Percentage	51.1%	43.1%	5.8%
- Garcia Richard: 40–50% 50–60% 60–70% 70–80% Lyons: 40–50% 50–60% 60–70% 70–80%
Commissioner before election
Aubrey Dunn Jr.
Libertarian
Elected Commissioner
Stephanie Garcia Richard
Democratic

Incumbent Libertarian Commissioner of Public Lands Aubrey Dunn Jr. did not run for re-election to a second term in office.

=== Democratic primary ===
==== Candidates ====
===== Declared =====
- Stephanie Garcia Richard, state representative
- George Muñoz, state senator
- Garrett VeneKlasen, executive director of the New Mexico Wildlife Federation

==== Results ====
Democratic primary results
Party	Candidate	Votes	%
Democratic	Stephanie Garcia Richard	65,601	39.5
Democratic	Garrett O. VeneKlasen	61,783	37.2
Democratic	George K. Muñoz	38,770	23.3
Total votes		166,154	100.0

=== Republican primary ===
==== Candidates ====
===== Declared =====
- Pat Lyons, New Mexico Public Regulation Commissioner for the 2nd district and former New Mexico Commissioner of Public Lands (2003–2011)

==== Results ====
Republican primary results
Party	Candidate	Votes	%
Republican	Patrick H. Lyons	67,527	100.0
Total votes		67,527	100.0

=== Libertarian primary ===
==== Candidates ====
===== Declared =====
- Michael Lucero, rancher

==== Results ====
Libertarian primary results
Party	Candidate	Votes	%
Libertarian	Michael G. Lucero	608	100.0
Total votes		608	100.0

=== General election ===
==== Polling ====
Poll source	Date(s) administered	Sample size	Margin of error	Stephanie Garcia Richard (D)	Pat Lyons (R)	Michael Lucero (L)	Undecided
Carroll Strategies	October 29, 2018	1,200	± 2.8%	45%	49%	3%	3%
Carroll Strategies	June 15–16, 2018	1,199	± 2.8%	44%	41%	5%	9%

==== Results ====
New Mexico Commissioner of Public Lands election, 2018
Party	Candidate	Votes	%	±%
Democratic	Stephanie Garcia Richard	352,335	51.10%	+1.17%
Republican	Pat Lyons	297,379	43.13%	−6.94%
Libertarian	Michael G. Lucero	39,791	5.77%	N/A
Total votes		689,505	100.0%	
Democratic gain from Libertarian				

== Public Regulation Commission ==
Three of the five seats on the New Mexico Public Regulation Commission were up for election.

District 2 Republican incumbent Pat Lyons did not run for re-election in order to run for Commissioner of Public Lands.

District 4 Democratic incumbent Lynda Lovejoy and District 5 Democratic incumbent Sandy R. Jones were eligible to run for re-election.

== Public Education Commission ==
Five of the ten seats on the New Mexico Public Education Commission were up for election.

District 2 incumbent Republican Millie Pogna, District 3 incumbent Democrat Carmie Lynn Toulouse, District 5 incumbent Democrat James F. Conyers, District 6 incumbent Democrat Gilbert Peralta, and District 7 incumbent Democrat Patricia Gipson were eligible to run for re-election.

== Supreme Court ==
Incumbent Gary L. Clingman was appointed by Governor Susana Martinez on April 6, 2018 after Justice Edward L. Chávez retired. Justice Clingman ran for re-election to finish the remainder of Justice Chavez's term, ending in 2022.

=== General election ===
==== Results ====
County results Vigil: 50–60% 60–70% 70–80% 80–90% Clingman: 50–60% 60–70% 70–80%

2018 New Mexico Supreme Court election
Party	Candidate	Votes	%
Democratic	Michael E. Vigil	403,573	59.17%
Republican	Gary L. Clingman (incumbent)	278,502	40.83%
Total votes		682,075	100.0%
Democratic gain from Republican			

== Court of Appeals ==
County results Bogardus: 50–60% 60–70% 70–80% French: 50–60% 60–70% 70–80%

2018 New Mexico Court of Appeals election (Position 1)
Party	Candidate	Votes	%
Democratic	Kristina Bogardus	370,314	54.58%
Republican	Stephen French (incumbent)	308,146	45.42%
Total votes		678,460	100.0%
Democratic gain from Republican			

County results Medina: 50–60% 60–70% 70–80% 80–90% Bohnhoff: 50–60% 60–70% 70–80%

2018 New Mexico Court of Appeals election (Position 2)
Party	Candidate	Votes	%
Democratic	Jacqueline Medina	391,429	57.81%
Republican	Henry Bohnhoff (incumbent)	285,681	42.19%
Total votes		677,110	100.0%
Democratic gain from Republican			

County results Zamora: 50–60% 60–70% 70–80% 80–90% Kiehne: 50–60% 60–70% 70–80%

County results Duffy: 50–60% 60–70% 70–80% Gallegos: 50–60% 60–70% 70–80%

2018 New Mexico Court of Appeals election (Position 3)
Party	Candidate	Votes	%
Democratic	Briana H. Zamora	390,971	57.79%
Republican	Emil Kiehne (incumbent)	285,554	42.21%
Total votes		676,525	100.0%
Democratic gain from Republican			

2018 New Mexico Court of Appeals election (Position 4)
Party	Candidate	Votes	%
Democratic	Megan Duffy	367,522	54.50%
Republican	Daniel Gallegos (incumbent)	306,814	45.50%
Total votes		674,336	100.0%
Democratic gain from Republican			

2018 New Mexico Court of Appeals election (Position 5)
Party	Candidate	Votes	%
Democratic	Jennifer Attrep (incumbent)	466,482	100.0%
Total votes		466,482	100.0%
Democratic hold			

2018 New Mexico Court of Appeals, Judge J. Miles Hanisee (R) retention election
Choice	Votes	%
For	382,151	69.44
Against	168,167	30.56
Total	550,318	100.00

== New Mexico House of Representatives ==
All 70 seats in the New Mexico House of Representatives were up for election in 2018. Democrats had a majority in the chamber heading into the election. On election day 2018, Democrats held 38 seats and Republicans held 32 seats. To re-claim control, Republicans needed to net four seats from Democrats.

Democrats increased their majority by flipping nine seats from Republican control. Following the 2018 election, Democrats held a 47 to 23 seat advantage over Republicans.

=== New Mexico State Senate ===
The New Mexico State Senate only holds regularly scheduled elections every four years; therefore, no state senate seats were up for election in 2018, but all 42 were in 2020.

== United States Senate ==
Incumbent Democratic Senator Martin Heinrich was re-elected to a second term.

United States Senate election in New Mexico, 2018
Party	Candidate	Votes	%
Democratic	Martin Heinrich (incumbent)	376,998	54.1
Republican	Mick Rich	212,813	30.5
Libertarian	Gary Johnson	107,201	15.4
Total votes		697,012	100.0
Democratic hold			

== United States House of Representatives ==
All of New Mexico's three seats in the United States House of Representatives were up for election in 2018. Democrats maintained District 1 and District 3 as well as flipped District 2 from Republicans. This means that there were no Republicans representing New Mexico in the federal government following the 2018 election.

=== District 1 ===
District 1 general election, 2018
Party	Candidate	Votes	%
Democratic	Deb Haaland	147,336	59.13
Republican	Janice Arnold-Jones	90,507	36.32
Libertarian	Lloyd Princeton	11,319	4.54
Total votes		249,162	100.0
Democratic hold			

=== District 2 ===
District 2 general election, 2018
Party	Candidate	Votes	%
Democratic	Xochitl Torres Small	101,489	50.93
Republican	Yvette Herrell	97,767	49.07
Total votes		199,256	100.0
Democratic gain from Republican			

=== District 3 ===
District 3 general election, 2018
Party	Candidate	Votes	%
Democratic	Ben Ray Luján (incumbent)	155,201	63.38
Republican	Jerald Steve McFall	76,427	31.21
Libertarian	Christopher Manning	13,265	5.42
Total votes		244,893	100.0
Democratic hold			

== Notes ==
Partisan clients
