= 2017 Albuquerque mayoral election =

- October 3, 2017 (primary election); November 14, 2017 (runoff election)
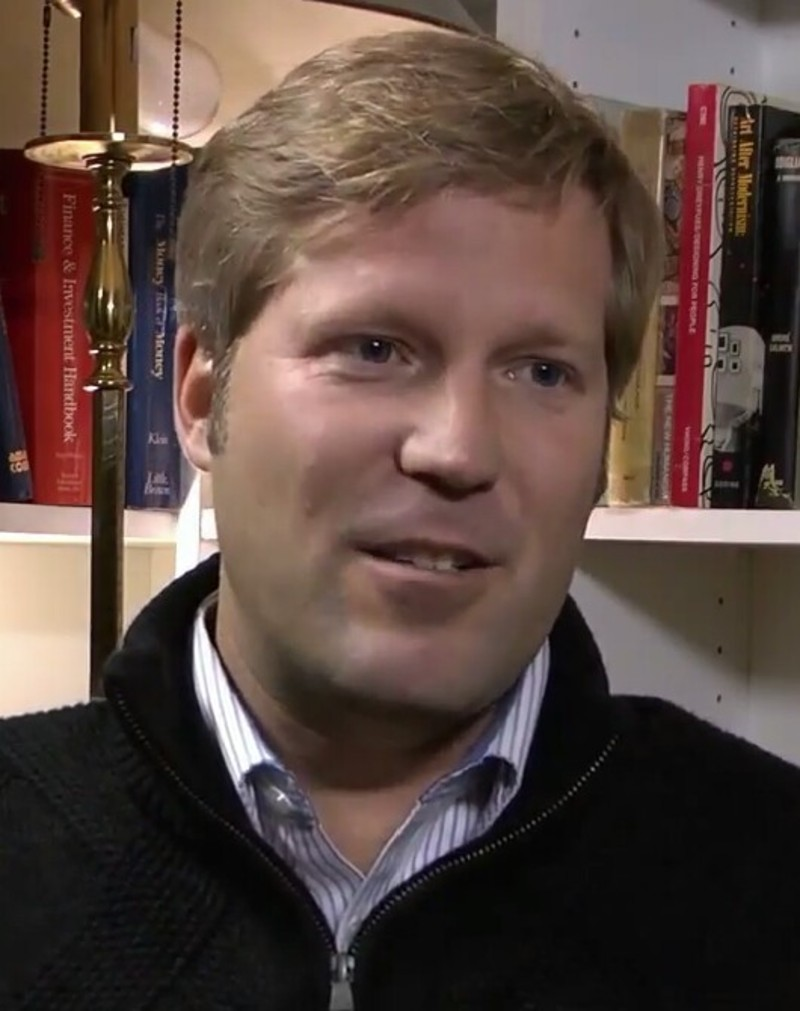

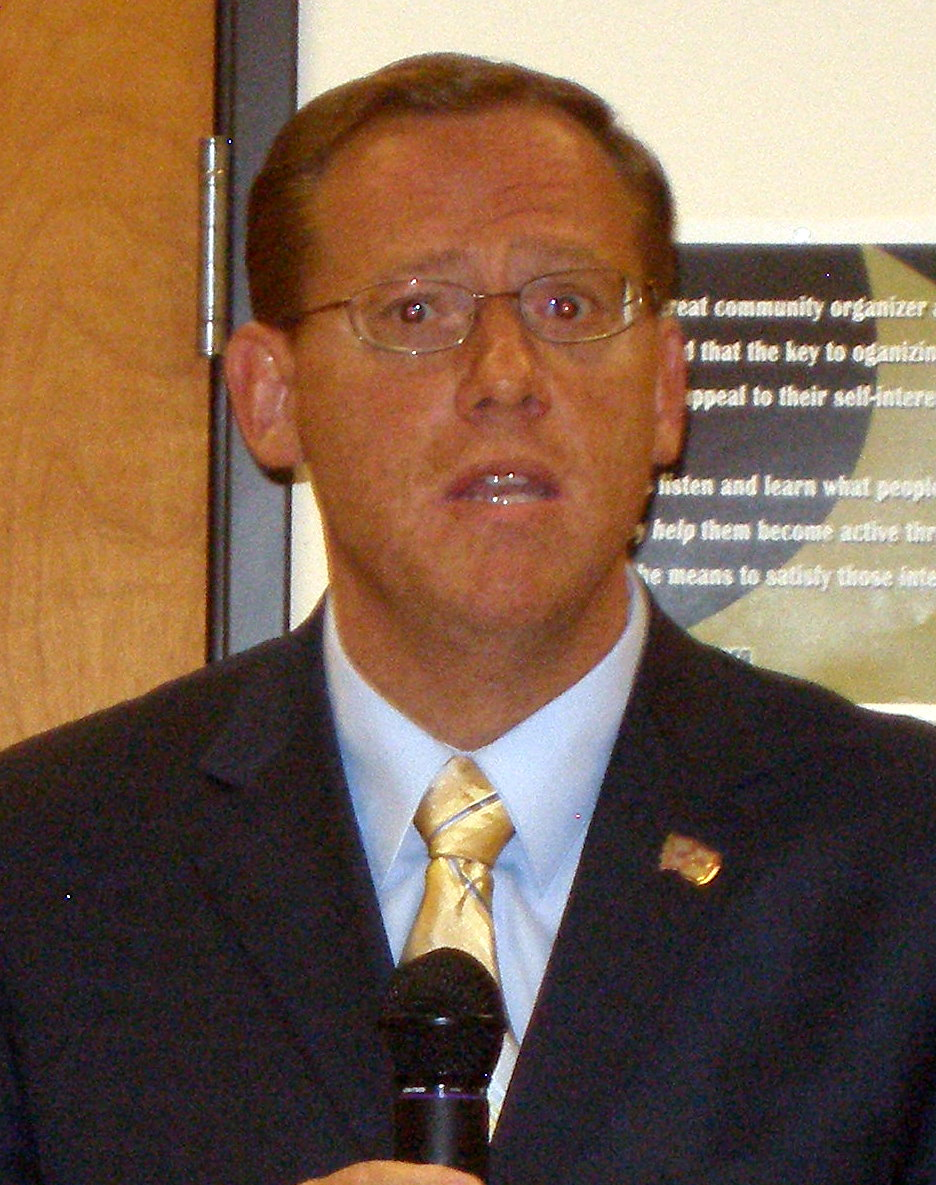

| Candidate | Tim Keller | Dan Lewis |
| First round | 38,163; 39.35% | 22,241; 22.93% |
| Runoff | 60,249; 62.20% | 36,615; 37.80% |
| Candidate | Brian Colón | Wayne Johnson |
| First round | 15,879; 16.37% | 9,346; 9.64% |
| Runoff | Eliminated | Eliminated |
Mayor before election
Richard Berry
Nonpartisan
Elected mayor
Tim Keller
Nonpartisan

The 2017 Albuquerque mayoral election took place on November 14, 2017, following a primary election on October 3, 2017. Incumbent Mayor Richard Berry declined to run for re-election to a third term. A crowded field emerged to succeed him, with State Auditor Tim Keller, City Councilor Dan Lewis, County Commissioner Wayne Johnson, and former Democratic Party Chair Brian Colón emerging as the frontrunners. In the primary election, Keller placed first, winning 39 percent of the vote, but falling short of the majority needed to avoid a runoff election. Lewis placed second with 23 percent, edging out Colón, who won 16 percent. In the runoff election, Keller defeated Lewis in a landslide, receiving 62 percent of the vote.

== General election ==
=== Candidates ===
- Tim Keller, State Auditor (Democratic)
- Dan Lewis, City Councilor (Republican)
- Brian Colón, 2010 Democratic nominee for Lieutenant Governor, former Chairman of the Democratic Party of New Mexico (Democratic)
- Wayne Johnson, County Commissioner (Republican)
- Gus Pedrotty, University of New Mexico student (Democratic)
- Michelle Garcia Holmes, retired police detective, former Chief of Staff to Attorney General Gary King (independent)
- Susan Wheeler-Deichsel, civic activist (independent)

==== Withdrawn ====
- Ricardo Chaves, businessman

==== Declined ====
- Deanna Archuleta, former County Commissioner, former Deputy Assistant Secretary of the Interior for Water and Science
- Richard Berry, incumbent Mayor
- Pete Dinelli, former City Councilor, candidate for Mayor in 1989 and 2013
- James B. Lewis, former State Treasurer

=== Polling ===
| Poll source | Date(s) administered | Sample size (Note: Key: A – all adults RV – registered voters LV – likely voters V – unclear) | Margin of error | Tim Keller | Brian Colón | Dan Lewis | Wayne Johnson | Michelle Garcia Holmes | Ricardo Chaves | Gus Pedrotty | Susan Wheeler- Deichsel | Undecided |
|---|---|---|---|---|---|---|---|---|---|---|---|---|
| KQRE News 13 | August 26–27, 2017 | 500 (LV) | ± 4.4% | 25% | 9% | 9% | 8% | 5% | 4% | 0% | 1% | 37% |
| Research & Polling Inc. | September 11–14, 2017 | 516 (LV) | ± 4.3% | 25% | 14% | 13% | 7% | 4% | 1% | 3% | 1% | 32% |

=== Results ===
Primary election results
| Party | Candidate | Votes | % |
|---|---|---|---|
| Nonpartisan | Tim Keller | 38,163 | 39.35% |
| Nonpartisan | Dan Lewis | 22,241 | 22.93% |
| Nonpartisan | Brian Colón | 15,879 | 16.37% |
| Nonpartisan | Wayne Johnson | 9,346 | 9.64% |
| Nonpartisan | Gus Pedrotty | 6,638 | 6.84% |
| Nonpartisan | Michelle Garcia Holmes | 3,752 | 3.87% |
| Nonpartisan | Susan Wheeler-Deichsel | 491 | 0.51% |
| Nonpartisan | Ricardo Chaves | 475 | 0.49% |
| Total votes | | 96,985 | 100.00% |

== Runoff election ==
=== Polling ===
| Poll source | Date(s) administered | Sample size | Margin of error | Tim Keller | Dan Lewis | Undecided |
|---|---|---|---|---|---|---|
| Carroll Strategies | October 4, 2017 | — (Note: No sample size was disclosed.) | ± 4.1% | 49% | 39% | 14% |

=== Results ===
2017 Albuquerque mayoral election results
| Party | Candidate | Votes | % |
|---|---|---|---|
| Nonpartisan | Tim Keller | 60,249 | 62.20% |
| Nonpartisan | Dan Lewis | 36,615 | 37.80% |
| Total votes | | 96,864 | 100.00% |
