= 2026 New Mexico Commissioner of Public Lands election =

- November 3, 2026
Nominee	Juan Sanchez (politician)	Michael Perry
Party	Democratic	Republican
Popular vote	434,085	281,091
Percentage	60.7%	39.3%
Commissioner of Public Lands before election
Stephanie Garcia Richard
Democratic
Elected Commissioner of Public Lands
Juan Sanchez
Democratic

The 2026 New Mexico Commissioner of Public Lands election took place on November 3, 2026, to elect the next New Mexico Commissioner of Public Lands. Incumbent Democratic Land Commissioner Stephanie Garcia Richard is term-limited and cannot run for re-election. Primary elections were held on June 2, 2026.

== Democratic primary ==
=== Candidates ===
==== Nominee ====
- Juan Sanchez, former U.S. Army Corps of Engineers natural resource specialist

==== Eliminated in primary ====
- Matthew McQueen, state representative from the 50th district (2015–present)
- Jonas Moya, former executive director of the Farm Service Agency in New Mexico

=== Results ===
Primary results by county: Sanchez: 40–50%; 50–60%; 60–70%; 70–80%; McQueen: 40–50%

Democratic primary results
Party	Candidate	Votes	%
Democratic	Juan Sanchez	115,067	56.3
Democratic	Matthew McQueen	66,987	32.8
Democratic	Jonas Moya	22,154	10.9
Total votes		204,208	100.0

== Republican primary ==
=== Candidates ===
==== Nominee ====
- Michael Perry, vice chair of the Chaves County Commission

=== Results ===
Republican primary results
Party	Candidate	Votes	%
Republican	Michael Perry	97,165	100.0
Total votes		97,165	100.0

== General election ==
=== Results ===
2026 New Mexico Commissioner of Public Lands election
Party	Candidate	Votes	%	±%
Democratic	Juan Sanchez	434,085	60.7	
Republican	Michael Perry	281,091	39.3	
Total votes		715,176	100.0	
