= Frank Olmstead =

American politician (1923–2004)

18th Auditor of New Mexico
- In office 1971–1974
- Governor: Bruce King
- Preceded by: Harold Thompson
- Succeeded by: Max Sánchez

Mayor of Las Vegas, New Mexico
- In office 1962–1966

Personal details
- Born: March 3, 1923 Cimarron, New Mexico, U.S.
- Died: January 28, 2004 (aged 81) Walsenburg, Colorado, U.S.
- Party: Democratic
- Spouse: Audrey Kern
- Children: 4
- Education: New Mexico Highlands University (BS)

Military service
- Branch/service: United States Army
- Battles/wars: World War II

Frank Olmstead (March 3, 1923 – January 28, 2004) was an American politician and accountant who served as the 18th Auditor of New Mexico from 1971 to 1974.

== Early life and education ==
Olmstead was born in Cimarron, New Mexico, and attended Maxwell High School in Maxwell, New Mexico. Olmstead served in the United States Army Air Corps and United States Army during World War II, where he was stationed in England and Germany and fought in the Battle of the Bulge.

== Career ==
After his discharge from the Army, Olmstead graduated from New Mexico Highlands University. He later became a Certified Public Accountant in Las Vegas, New Mexico, before serving as the town's mayor from 1962 to 1966. Olmstead then relocated to Albuquerque, New Mexico, with his family, where he continued to work as a CPA. Olmstead served as the 18th Auditor of New Mexico from 1971 to 1974. He was a member of the Democratic Party.

== Personal life ==
Olmstead and his wife, Audrey Kern, had four children. After suffering from thyroid cancer, Olmstead died on January 28, 2004, in Walsenburg, Colorado.

== See also ==
- List of mayors of Las Vegas, New Mexico
