= John Wertheim =

American lawyer and politician

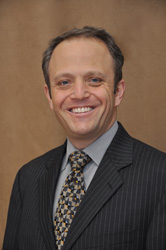
John Wertheim

John V. Wertheim (born 12 February 1968) is an American lawyer and politician who served as Chairman of the Democratic Party of New Mexico from 2004 until 2007. During that time, he also served on the Executive Committee of the Democratic National Committee. In 1996, he was the Democratic nominee for the United States House of Representatives in New Mexico's 1st congressional district against the incumbent Representative Steve Schiff of the Republican Party (United States). The treasurer for his congressional campaign was Arvind A. Raichur.

Wertheim ran for New Mexico State Treasurer in 2014.

Wertheim is a graduate of Yale University, where the Yale Political Union elected him President and then Speaker. Representing the Yale Debate Association, he and partner Matt Wolf won the 1990 World Universities Debating Championship held at the Glasgow University Union in Scotland, becoming the first Americans to do so. In 1990, he and debate partner Austan Goolsbee placed second at the APDA National Debating Championship. At Yale, he was also a member of the secret society Skull and Bones.

In his senior year of high school, 1986, Wertheim won dual championships at the National Speech and Debate Tournament, sponsored by the National Forensic League, in both Foreign Extemporaneous Speaking and Lincoln-Douglas Debate.

Wertheim received his J.D. degree from the University of New Mexico School of Law in 1995. He is married to Bianca Ortiz-Wertheim.
