= Jeff Carr (American politician) =

Mayor of Eagle Nest, New Mexico, US

Jeff Carr is an American Democratic politician from Eagle Nest, New Mexico. He has taught in public education for more than 27 years, worked as a stockbroker, commercial insurance agent and a nuclear weapons specialist. He has also served as a municipal judge and the Mayor Pro-Tem of Eagle Nest, New Mexico.

Carr ran for the position of Lieutenant Governor in New Mexico's 2018 gubernatorial election.

Carr is a registered Independent and wants "to be an active proponent of education."
