= Domingo Martinez (politician) =

New Mexico State Auditor

24th Auditor of New Mexico
- In office 1999–2006
- Governor: Gary Johnson; Bill Richardson
- Preceded by: Robert E. Vigil
- Succeeded by: Hector Balderas

Personal details
- Party: Democratic
- Education: College of Santa Fe (BS); University of New Mexico (MPA)

Domingo Martinez is an American politician who served as the 24th New Mexico State Auditor from 1999 to 2006.

== Education ==
Martinez earned a Bachelor of Science in accounting from the College of Santa Fe and Master of Public Administration from the University of New Mexico.

== Career ==
Prior to serving as State Auditor, Martinez worked as a staffer in the New Mexico Taxation and Revenue Department and State Auditor's Office. Elected as New Mexico State Auditor in 1999, Martinez succeeded Robert E. Vigil, who was elected New Mexico State Treasurer before being indicted on corruption charges. Martinez served as State Auditor until 2006. After leaving office, he served as Santa Fe County Assessor until 2013. In 2013, Martinez announced his candidacy to again serve as New Mexico State Auditor, but later dropped out of the race, citing health concerns.

== Private life ==
Domingo Martinez has stated that he is in a polyamorous relationship with multiple women and has 5 children with 3 of them.
