= Democratic Party of New Mexico =

New Mexico affiliate of the Democratic Party

- Abbreviation: DPNM
- Chairperson: Sara Attleson
- Governor of New Mexico: Michelle Lujan Grisham
- Lieutenant Governor of New Mexico: Howie Morales
- Senate President Pro Tempore: Mimi Stewart
- House Speaker: Javier Martínez
- Headquarters: 300 Central Ave, SE; Albuquerque, New Mexico 87102
- Membership (August 27, 2025): 543,026
- National affiliation: Democratic Party
- Colors: Blue
- Seats in the United States Senate: 2 / 2
- Seats in the United States House of Representatives: 3 / 3
- Seats in the New Mexico State Senate: 27 / 42
- Seats in the New Mexico House of Representatives: 45 / 70
- Justices on the Supreme Court of New Mexico: 5 / 5

Election symbol

Website
- www.nmdemocrats.org

The Democratic Party of New Mexico (DPNM) is the affiliate of the Democratic Party in the U.S. state of New Mexico. It is headquartered in Albuquerque and led by Chair Sara Attleson, Vice Chair Cam Crawford, Secretary Brenda Hoskie, and Treasurer Caroline Zamora.

The party has provided 19 of the 31 governors of New Mexico. It is currently the dominant party in the state, controlling all 3 of New Mexico's U.S. House seats, both U.S. Senate seats, both houses of the state legislature, and the governorship. The New Mexico Democratic Party is led by Jessica Velasquez, with other modern prominent figures include Governor Michelle Lujan Grisham and Attorney General Raúl Torrez.

== Historical development ==
New Mexico Territory elected its first delegate to the U.S. House of Representatives in 1850: Richard Hanson Weightman, a Democrat. At this time, the Democratic Party was socially conservative and many Democrats supported expanding slavery into new Western territories. This pro-slavery position stopped New Mexico's first attempt at a state constitution (which prohibited slavery) from being ratified in 1850, preventing the territory from becoming a state.

In the early 1900s, Democratic politician Octaviano Ambrosio Larrazolo led a movement in favor of civil rights for Hispanic and Latino Americans and Spanish speakers in New Mexico. He found that most Latinos identified as Republicans, which disturbed Larrazolo because he felt that the Republican political machine in the territory was exploiting its Hispanic voters. When New Mexico Territory was preparing to become a state in 1910, Larrazolo was selected as a delegate to the constitutional convention. He succeeded in making sure that the state's constitution protected and guaranteed the political, civil, and religious rights of those of Spanish and Mexican descent. However, other state Democrats opposed these protections and unsuccessfully attempted to prevent the new constitution from being ratified. After being opposed by his own party, Larrazolo became a Republican and served as a Republican governor and senator from New Mexico.

Like the national Democratic Party, the Democratic Party of New Mexico underwent significant ideological changes throughout the 20th century. Since the growth of social liberalism began in the party, Democrats have found success in New Mexico. Between 1931 and 1951, and again between 1971 and 1987, all executive offices in the state were consistently held by Democrats. With brief exceptions, there have generally been Democratic majorities in both houses of the New Mexico Legislature since 1930. In 1977, the Democratic Women of New Mexico caucus was founded with the purpose of promoting women's voices in the state and national party. This caucus later became a chapter of the National Federation of Democratic Women.

As of 2020, the Democratic Party of New Mexico is made up of county party organizations in all of the state's 33 counties, and is governed by the State Central Committee of DPNM, which meets twice each year to conduct the regular business of the organization and elect its officers. In addition to the New Mexico Federation of Democratic Women, the party includes a Native American Democratic Caucus, a Labor Caucus, a Veterans Caucus, and several other caucuses. There are also standing DPNM committees for dealing with specific ongoing issues, including affirmative action, budget and finance, platforms and resolutions (SPARC), and state rules (SRC), and the Judicial Council.

== Ideological and issue stances ==
The New Mexico Democratic Party stated its ideological stances in its 2014 platform. Economically, the party supports a balanced budget made possible by progressive taxation and promotes fair trade and fair labor practices. Like the national Democratic Party, the DPNM supports environmental protection and emphasizes the importance of natural resources such as land and water. The party believes that every citizen should have the right to health care, education, and Social Security. It also aims to protect tribal sovereignty and make sure all Native Americans are recognized in the state.

== Incumbent Democratic officeholders ==
All of the state's seven executive offices are held by Democrats. Democrats also hold supermajorities in both houses of the New Mexico State Legislature.

=== Members of Congress ===
Democrats control both of New Mexico's U.S. Senate seats and all three of New Mexico's seats in the U.S. House of Representatives.

==== U.S. Senate ====
Democrats have controlled both of New Mexico's seats in the U.S. Senate since 2008:

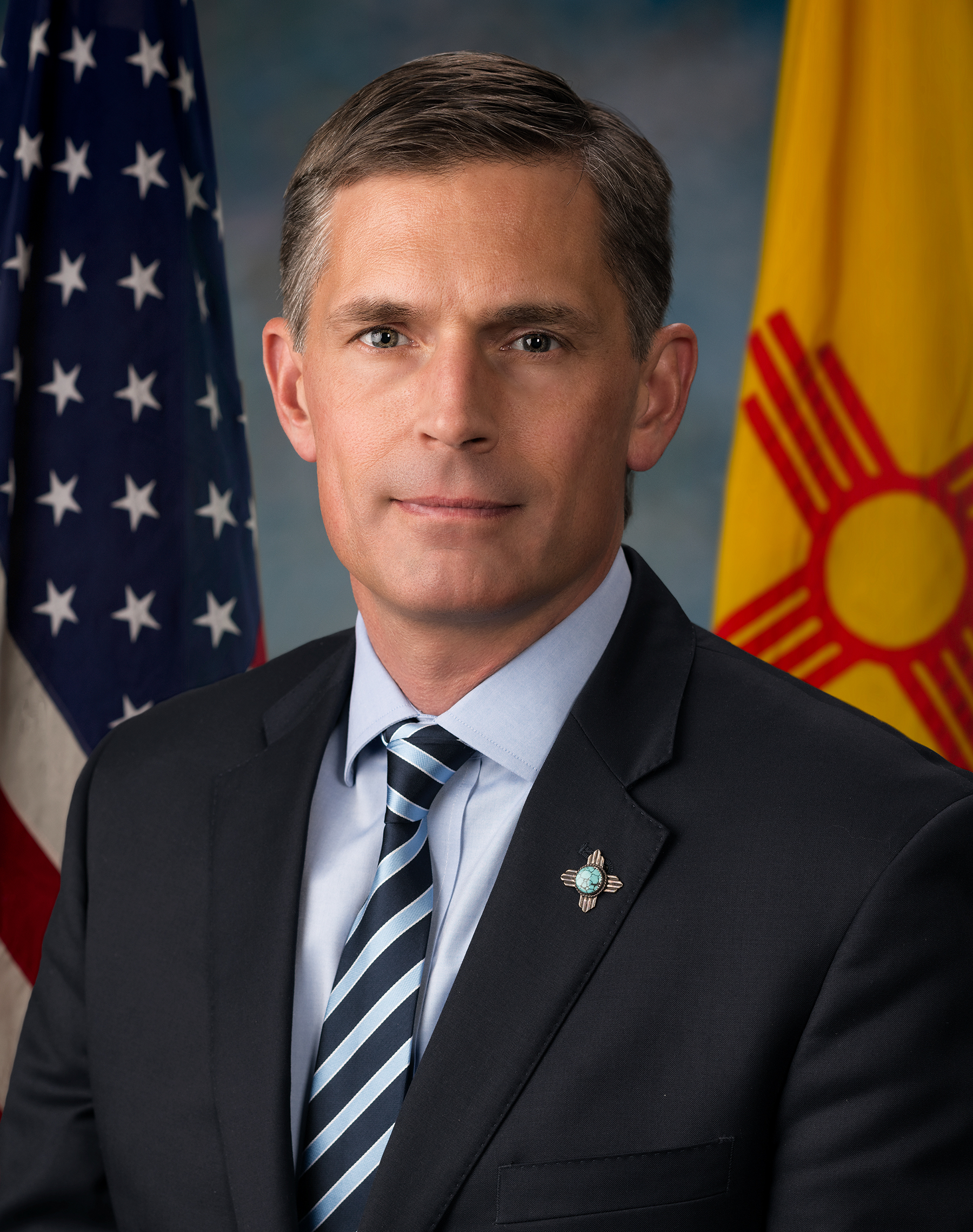
Senior U.S. Senator Martin Heinrich

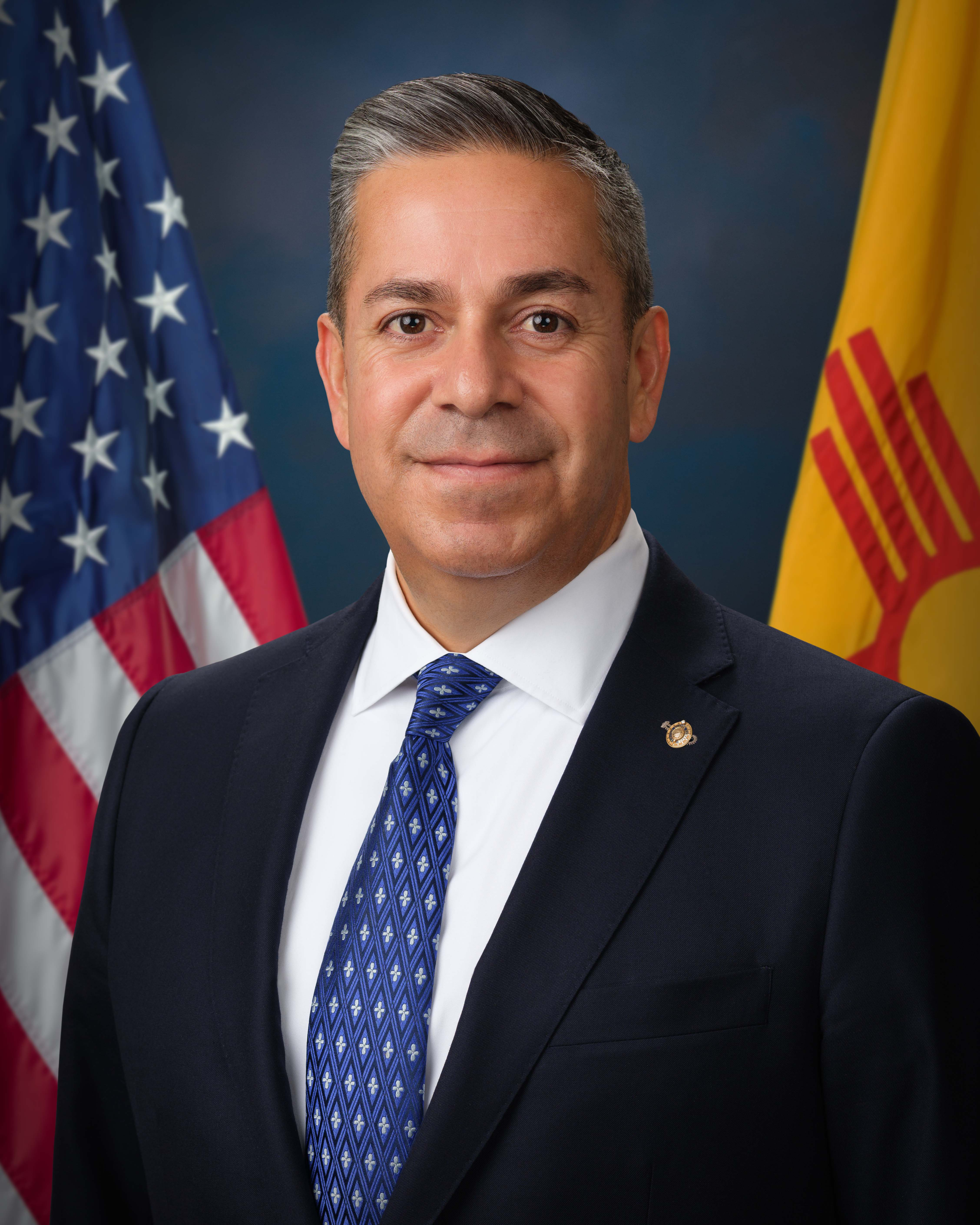
Junior U.S. Senator Ben Ray Luján

==== U.S. House of Representatives ====
District	Member	Photo
1st	Melanie Stansbury	
2nd	Gabe Vasquez	
3rd	Teresa Leger Fernandez	

=== Statewide offices ===
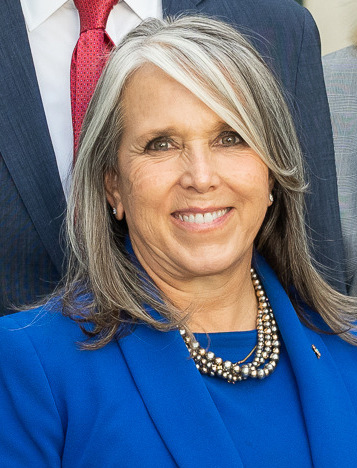
Governor Michelle Lujan Grisham

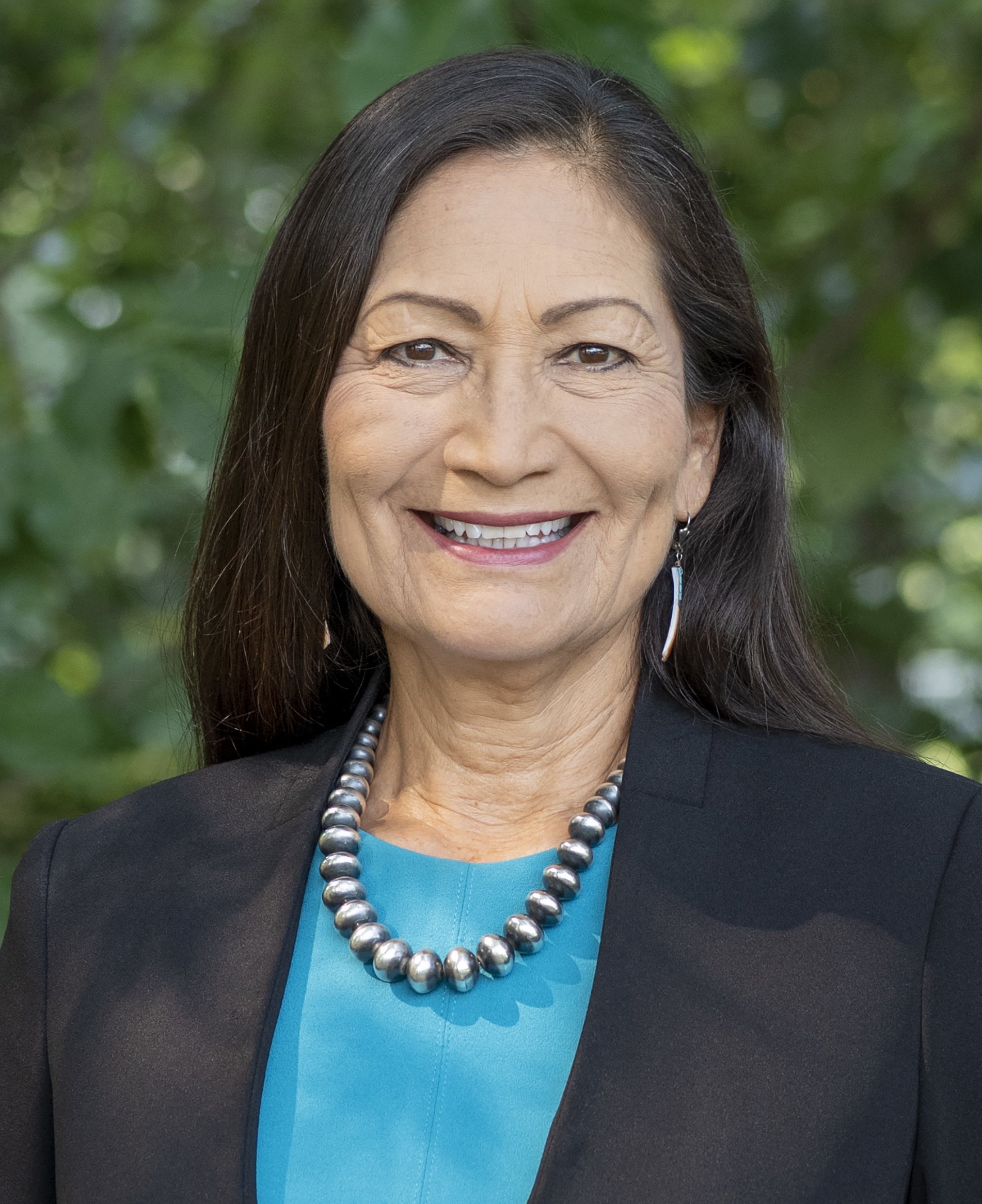
Governor-elect Deb Haaland

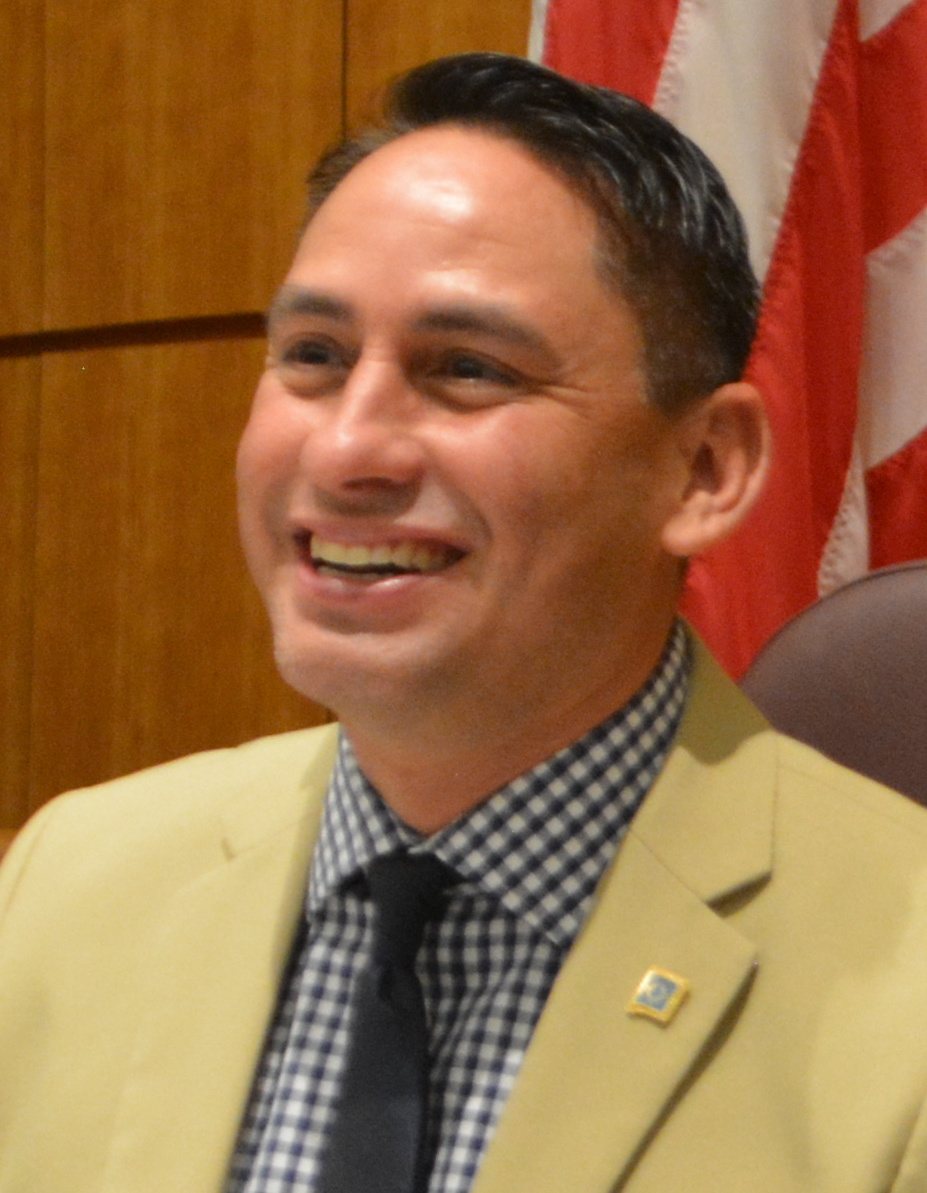
Lieutenant Governor Howie Morales

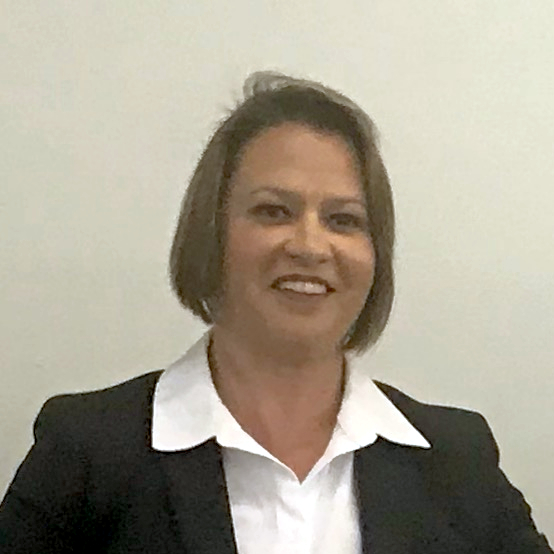
Commissioner of Public Lands → Lieutenant Governor-elect Stephanie Garcia Richard

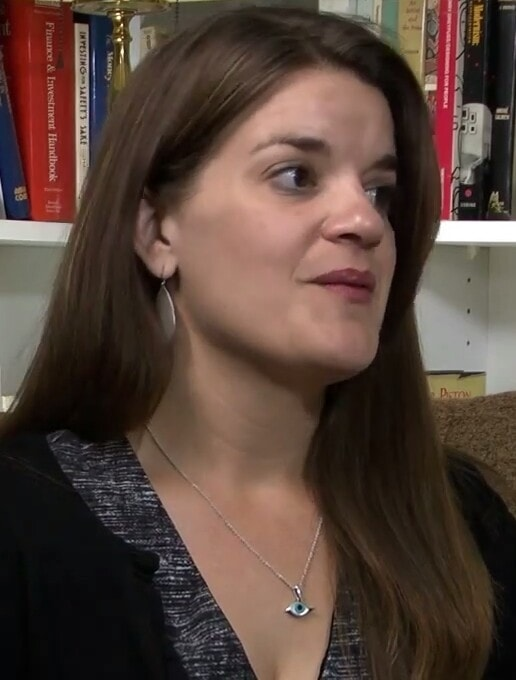
Secretary of State Maggie Toulouse Oliver

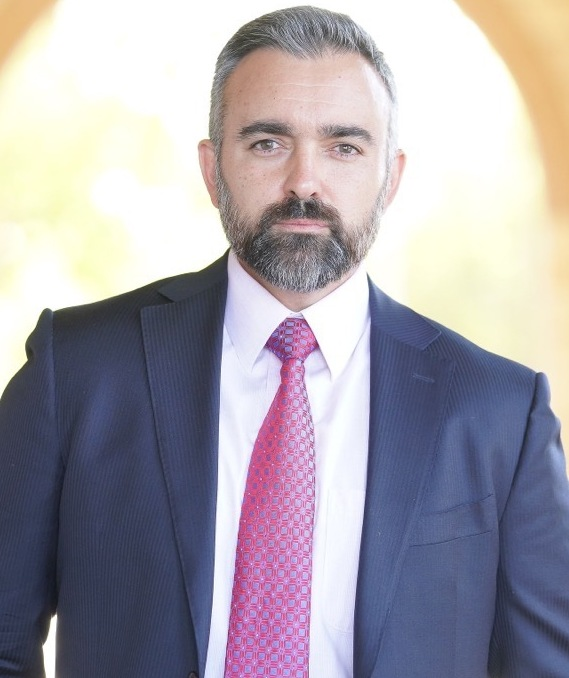
Attorney General Raúl Torrez
- Secretary of State-elect: Amanda López Askin
- State treasurer: Laura Montoya
- Auditor: Joseph Maestas
- Commissioner of Public Lands-elect: Juan Sanchez

=== State legislative leaders ===
- Senate president pro tempore: Mimi Stewart
  - Senate majority leader: Peter Wirth
  - Senate majority whip: Linda Lopez
- House speaker: Brian Egolf
  - Leader of the House: Javier Martínez
  - House majority whip: Doreen Gallegos

=== Mayors ===
- Albuquerque: Tim Keller (1)
- Santa Fe: Alan Webber (4)
- Roswell: Timothy Jennings (5)

== Election results ==
=== Federal ===
==== Presidential ====
New Mexico Democratic Party presidential election results
Election	Presidential ticket	Votes	%	Electoral votes	State result	National result
1912	Woodrow Wilson/Thomas R. Marshall	20,437	41.39%	3 / 3	Won	Won
1916	Woodrow Wilson/Thomas R. Marshall	33,527	50.20%	3 / 3	Won	Won
1920	James M. Cox/Franklin D. Roosevelt	46,668	44.27%	0 / 3	Lost	Lost
1924	John W. Davis/Charles W. Bryan	48,542	43.02%	0 / 3	Lost	Lost
1928	Al Smith/Joseph T. Robinson	48,211	40.85%	0 / 3	Lost	Lost
1932	Franklin D. Roosevelt/John N. Garner	95,089	62.72%	3 / 3	Won	Won
1936	Franklin D. Roosevelt/John N. Garner	106,037	62.69%	3 / 3	Won	Won
1940	Franklin D. Roosevelt/Henry A. Wallace	103,699	56.59%	3 / 3	Won	Won
1944	Franklin D. Roosevelt/Harry S. Truman	81,389	53.47%	4 / 4	Won	Won
1948	Harry S. Truman/Alben W. Barkley	105,464	56.38%	4 / 4	Won	Won
1952	Adlai Stevenson/John Sparkman	105,661	44.28%	0 / 4	Lost	Lost
1956	Adlai Stevenson/Estes Kefauver	106,098	41.78%	0 / 4	Lost	Lost
1960	John F. Kennedy/Lyndon B. Johnson	156,027	50.15%	4 / 4	Won	Won
1964	Lyndon B. Johnson/Hubert Humphrey	194,017	59.22%	4 / 4	Won	Won
1968	Hubert Humphrey/Edmund Muskie	130,081	39.75%	0 / 4	Lost	Lost
1972	George McGovern/Sargent Shriver	141,084	36.56%	0 / 4	Lost	Lost
1976	Jimmy Carter/Walter Mondale	201,148	48.28%	0 / 4	Lost	Won
1980	Jimmy Carter/Walter Mondale	167,826	36.78%	0 / 4	Lost	Lost
1984	Walter Mondale/Geraldine Ferraro	201,769	39.23%	0 / 5	Lost	Lost
1988	Michael Dukakis/Lloyd Bentsen	244,497	46.90%	0 / 5	Lost	Lost
1992	Bill Clinton/Al Gore	261,617	45.90%	5 / 5	Won	Won
1996	Bill Clinton/Al Gore	273,495	49.18%	5 / 5	Won	Won
2000	Al Gore/Joe Lieberman	286,783	47.9%	5 / 5	Won	Lost
2004	John Kerry/John Edwards	370,942	49.05%	0 / 5	Lost	Lost
2008	Barack Obama/Joe Biden	472,422	56.91%	5 / 5	Won	Won
2012	Barack Obama/Joe Biden	415,335	52.99%	5 / 5	Won	Won
2016	Hillary Clinton/Tim Kaine	385,234	48.26%	5 / 5	Won	Lost
2020	Joe Biden/Kamala Harris	501,614	54.29%	5 / 5	Won	Won
2024	Kamala Harris/Tim Walz	478,802	51.85%	5 / 5	Won	Lost

==== U.S. Senate ====
Class 1
Year	Candidate	Votes	%	Result
1970	Joseph Montoya	151,486	52.56%	Won ✓
1976	Joseph Montoya	176,382	42.70%	Lost ✗
1982	Jeff Bingaman	217,682	53.77%	Won ✓
1988	Jeff Bingaman	321,983	63.31%	Won ✓
1994	Jeff Bingaman	249,989	53.97%	Won ✓
2000	Jeff Bingaman	363,744	61.70%	Won ✓
2006	Jeff Bingaman	394,217	70.60%	Won ✓
2012	Martin Heinrich	395,717	44.71%	Won ✓
2018	Martin Heinrich	376,998	54.09%	Won ✓
2024	Martin Heinrich	497,333	55.06%	Won ✓

Class 2
Year	Candidate	Votes	%	Result
1972	Jack Daniels	173,815	45.97%	Lost ✗
1978	Toney Anaya	160,045	46.59%	Lost ✗
1984	Judith Pratt	141,253	28.10%	Lost ✗
1990	Tom Benavidez	110,033	27.05%	Lost ✗
1996	Art Trujillo	164,356	29.78%	Lost ✗
2002	Gloria Tristani	169,039	34.97%	Lost ✗
2008	Tom Udall	505,128	61.33%	Won ✓
2014	Tom Udall	286,409	55.56%	Won ✓
2020	Ben Ray Luján	521,994	47.10%	Won ✓
2026	Ben Ray Luján	458,756	63.26%	Won ✓

==== U.S. House ====
Election	Votes	%	Seats (NM)	±	%
2016	436,932	56.01	2 / 3	0	3.03
2018	400,702	58.25	3 / 3	▲1	2.24
2020	495,781	54.86	2 / 3	▼1	3.39
2022	387,665	55.06	3 / 3	▲1	0.20
2024	493,722	55.07	3 / 3	0	0.01
2026	444,863	61.58	3 / 3	0	6.51

=== State ===
==== Executive offices ====
Governor
Election	Candidate/ticket	Votes	%	Result
1911	William C. McDonald	31,036	51.01%	Won ✓
1916	Ezequiel Cabeza De Baca	32,875	49.40%	Won ✓
1918	Felix Garcia	22,433	47.70%	Lost ✗
1920	Richard H. Hanna	50,755	47.80%	Lost ✗
1922	James F. Hinkle	60,317	54.57%	Won ✓
1924	Arthur T. Hannett	56,183	48.82%	Won ✓
1926	Arthur T. Hannett	52,523	48.15%	Lost ✗
1928	Robert C. Dow	52,550	44.30%	Lost ✗
1930	Arthur Seligman	62,789	53.17%	Won ✓
1932	Arthur Seligman	83,612	54.82%	Won ✓
1934	Clyde Tingley	78,390	51.90%	Won ✓
1936	Clyde Tingley	97,090	57.21%	Won ✓
1938	John E. Miles	82,344	52.24%	Won ✓
1940	John E. Miles	103,035	55.59%	Won ✓
1942	John J. Dempsey	59,258	54.55%	Won ✓
1944	John J. Dempsey	76,443	51.81%	Won ✓
1946	Thomas J. Mabry	70,055	52.70%	Won ✓
1948	Thomas J. Mabry	103,969	54.72%	Won ✓
1950	John E. Miles	83,359	46.26%	Lost ✗
1952	Everett Grantham	111,034	46.23%	Lost ✗
1954	John F. Simms	110,583	57.01%	Won ✓
1956	John F. Simms	120,263	47.77%	Lost ✗
1958	John Burroughs	103,481	50.47%	Won ✓
1960	John Burroughs	151,777	49.68%	Lost ✗
1962	Jack M. Campbell	130,933	52.98%	Won ✓
1964	Jack M. Campbell	191,497	60.21%	Won ✓
1966	Gene Lusk	125,587	48.26%	Lost ✗
1968	Fabian Chavez Jr.	157,230	49.29%	Lost ✗
1970	Bruce King	148,835	51.26%	Won ✓
1974	Jerry Apodaca	164,172	49.94%	Won ✓
1978	Bruce King	174,631	50.53%	Won ✓
1982	Toney Anaya	215,840	52.97%	Won ✓
1986	Ray Powell	185,378	46.95%	Lost ✗
1990	Bruce King/Casey Luna	224,564	54.61%	Won ✓
1994	Bruce King/Patricia A. Madrid	186,686	39.92%	Lost ✗
1998	Martin Chávez/Diane Denish	226,755	45.47%	Lost ✗
2002	Bill Richardson/Diane Denish	268,693	55.49%	Won ✓
2006	Bill Richardson/Diane Denish	384,806	68.82%	Won ✓
2010	Diane Denish/Brian Colón	280,614	46.55%	Lost ✗
2014	Gary King/Deb Haaland	219,362	42.78%	Lost ✗
2018	Michelle Lujan Grisham/Howie Morales	398,368	57.20%	Won ✓
2022	Michelle Lujan Grisham/Howie Morales	370,168	51.97%	Won ✓
2026	Deb Haaland/Stephanie Garcia Richard	412,834	57.2%	Won ✓

Attorney General
Year	Candidate	Votes	%	Result
2014	Hector Balderas	295,008	58.3%	Won ✓
2018	Hector Balderas	427,583	61.8%	Won ✓
2022	Raúl Torrez	388,592	55.31%	Won ✓
2026	Raúl Torrez	453,938	43.0%	Won ✓

Secretary of State
Year	Candidate	Votes	%	Result
2014	Maggie Toulouse Oliver	245,508	48.4%	Lost ✗
2016 (sp.)	Maggie Toulouse Oliver	433,227	56.4%	Won ✓
2018	Maggie Toulouse Oliver	399,134	57.8%	Won ✓
2022	Maggie Toulouse Oliver	384,526	54.52%	Won ✓
2026	Amanda López Askin	436,638	60.9%	Won ✓

== See also ==
- Political party strength in New Mexico
- New Mexico Democratic primary, 2008
- New Mexico Democratic caucuses, 2004
