= Deanna Archuleta =

American politician

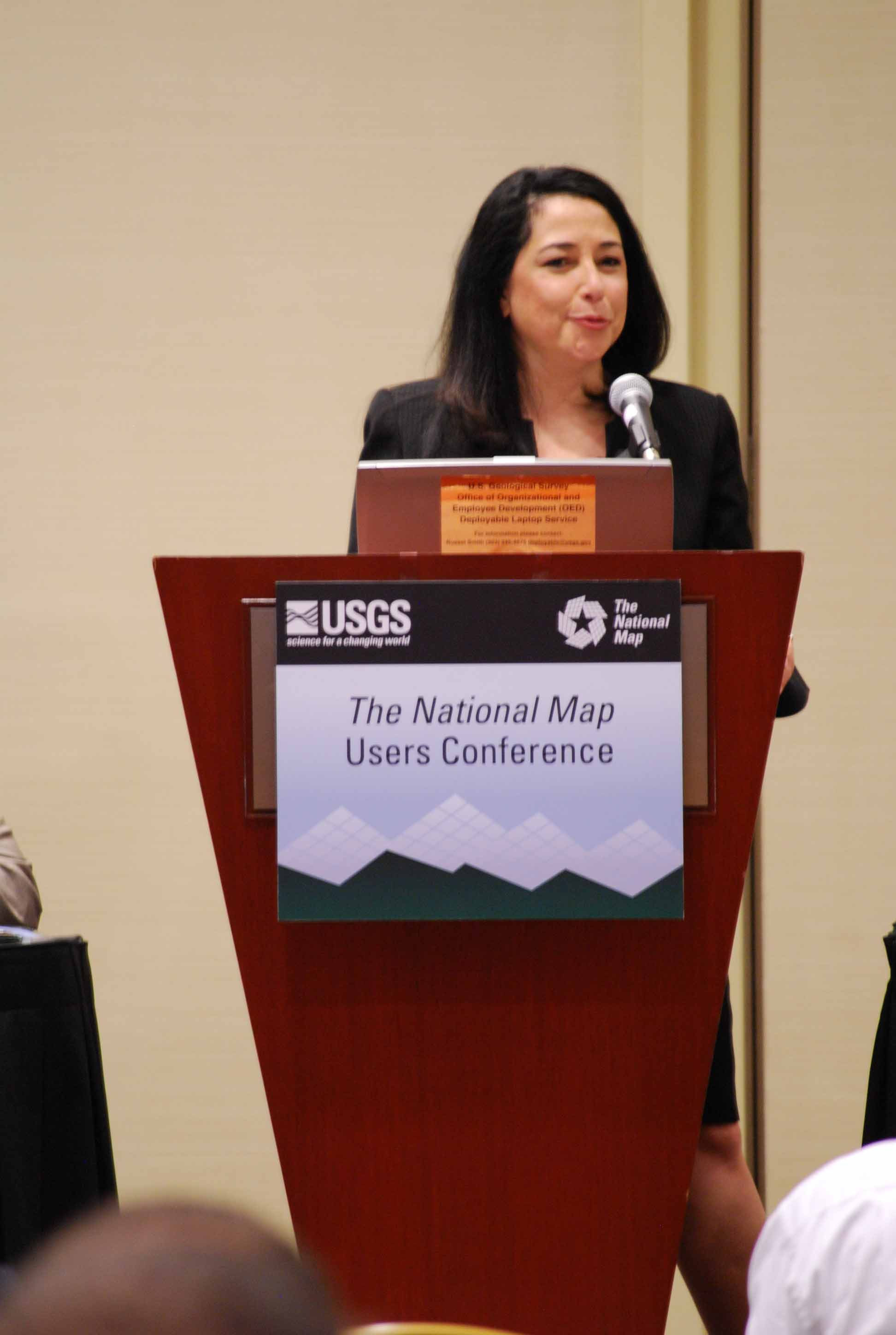

Deputy Assistant Secretary of the Interior for Water and Science
- In office May 2009 – May 2011
- President: Barack Obama

Member of the Bernalillo County Board of Commissioners
- In office January 2005 – April 2009

Personal details
- Born: 1964 (age 61–62) Santa Fe, New Mexico, U.S.
- Education: University of Washington (BA); University of New Mexico (MS)

Deanna A. Archuleta (born 1964) is a Washington DC lobbyist and former American government official who served as the deputy assistant secretary for water and science in the Department of the Interior and former senior adviser to the secretary of the interior. From New Mexico, she served as a member of the Bernalillo County Board of Commissioners and was a candidate for mayor of Albuquerque in 2017.

== Career ==
Before her appointment to the department, Archuleta was the southwest regional director for the Wilderness Society, which promoted land conservation and environmental protection throughout the region. She also served on President-elect Barack Obama's Transition Team in Washington, D.C.

Archuleta served as a member of the Bernalillo County Board of Commissioners from January 2005 until April 2009, and was elected to serve as the chair of the commission in 2009.

From January 2008 to April 2009, Archuleta served as board chair of the Bernalillo County Water Utility, overseeing the completion of the San Juan Chama Drinking Water Project.

In May 2009, Archuleta was appointed by President Barack Obama to serve as deputy assistant secretary for water and science in the Department of the Interior. As Deputy Assistant Secretary, Archuleta was the supervisor of the United States Geological Survey. Overseeing the USGS also included the $1.1 billion budget for 2010, 2011, and 2012. As well as managing the Earthquake Hazards Program.

Archuleta also served a brief stint on the NM State Game Commission at the behest of Governor Michelle Lujan Grishamin 2023.

She is currently a Principal at The Vogel Group in its Government Affairs practice.

=== 2017 mayoral election ===
Deanna Archuleta was a candidate for mayor of Albuquerque in the 2017 election. Archuleta was the first candidate to declare in May 2016. Archuleta was one of 9 candidates that have collected enough signatures to be placed on the ballot for mayor. Citing of her father's failing health, Archuleta chose to drop out of the mayoral race on May 26, 2017.
