= Wayne Johnson (New Mexico politician) =

American politician

27th Auditor of New Mexico
- In office December 1, 2017 – January 1, 2019
- Governor: Susana Martinez
- Preceded by: Tim Keller
- Succeeded by: Brian Colón

Member of the Bernalillo County Commission from the 5th district
- In office 2010–2017
- Preceded by: Michael Brasher
- Succeeded by: James E. Smith

Personal details
- Born: Albuquerque, New Mexico, U.S.
- Party: Republican
- Education: University of New Mexico

Wayne Johnson is an American politician who served as the 27th Auditor of New Mexico. A Republican, he had previously represented the 5th district on the Bernalillo County Board of County Commissioners from 2010 to 2017.

Johnson was a candidate for Mayor of Albuquerque in 2017.

Political offices
Preceded by Tim Keller	Auditor of New Mexico; 2017–2019	Succeeded by Brian Colón
