= Brian Colón =

American politician (born 1970)

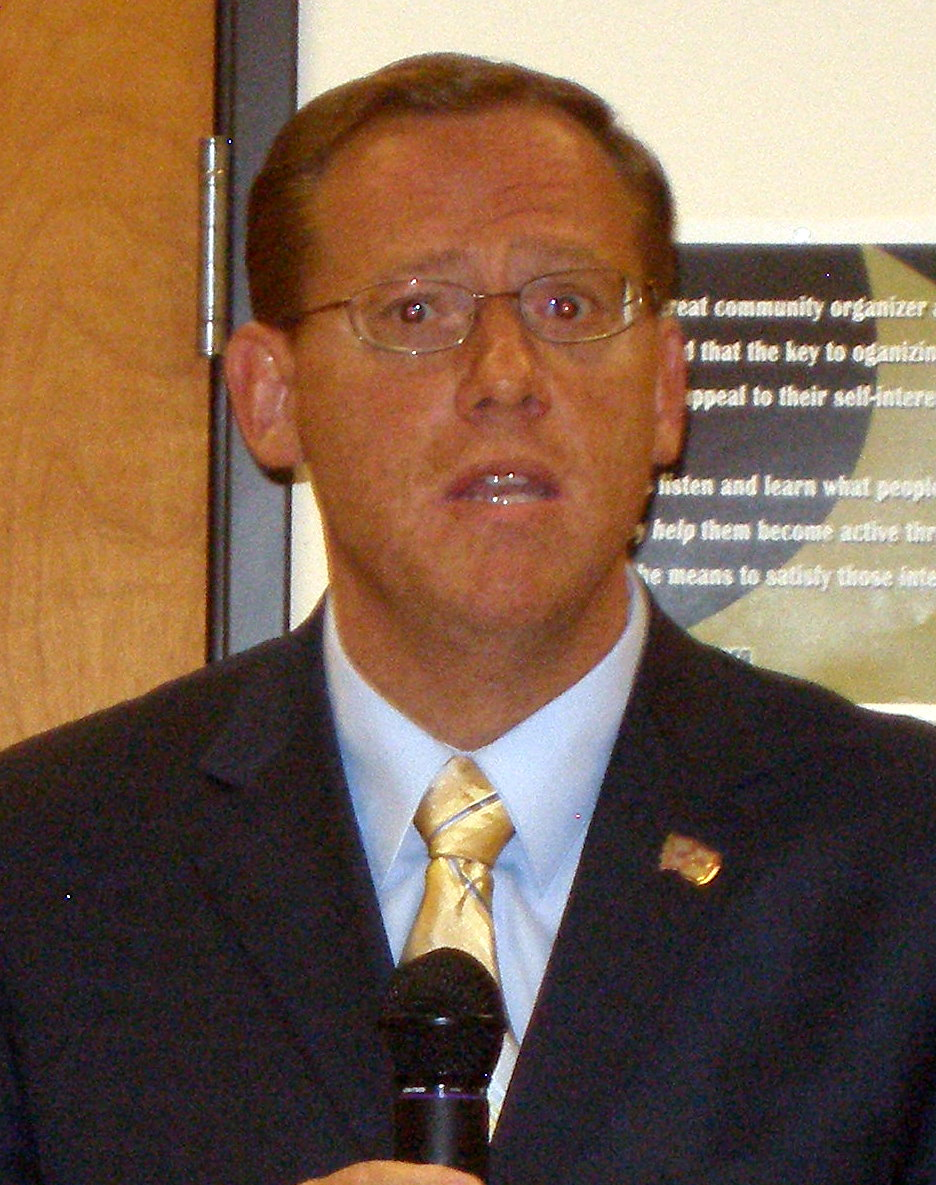
- Colón in 2010

28th Auditor of New Mexico
- In office January 1, 2019 – January 1, 2023
- Governor: Michelle Lujan Grisham
- Preceded by: Wayne Johnson
- Succeeded by: Joseph Maestas

Chair of the New Mexico Democratic Party
- In office April 28, 2007 – August 8, 2009
- Preceded by: John Wertheim
- Succeeded by: Annadelle Sanchez (acting)

Personal details
- Born: January 26, 1970 (age 56) New York City, New York, U.S.
- Party: Democratic
- Education: New Mexico State University (BS); University of New Mexico (JD)

Brian S. Colón (born January 26, 1970) is an American lawyer and politician who served as the New Mexico state auditor from 2019 to 2023. He is the former chairman of the Democratic Party of New Mexico. In 2010, he ran for and lost his bid for Lieutenant Governor of New Mexico. He has chaired Popejoy Hall's board of directors and has served with the board of trustees for the Albuquerque Community Foundation. On November 6, 2018, he defeated Republican Wayne Johnson in the general election for New Mexico state auditor. He was an unsuccessful candidate for Attorney General of New Mexico in the 2022 election.

== Early life and education ==
Colón is of Puerto Rican descent. He was born in New York City and moved to Valencia County, New Mexico as a child.

Colón was the first in his family to attend college, graduating from New Mexico State University in 1998 after spending 10 years taking courses and starting a number of small businesses to pay his way through school. He then entered the University of New Mexico School of Law and earned a Juris Doctor in 2001.

== Career ==
In 2004, Colón was named Outstanding Young Lawyer of the Year by the State Bar of New Mexico and one of New Mexico's Forty Under 40 Power Brokers by the New Mexico Business Weekly. Colón has served on the New Mexico Hispanic Bar Association's Board of Directors since 2001 and is a member of the American Inns of Court. Colón has also served on the State Bar of New Mexico’s Committee on Diversity since 2003, and is a board member for the New Mexico College Success Network. He has been a board member for the New Mexico State University Alumni Association, is active in Aggies for Legislation, and has twice been appointed by Governor Bill Richardson as a commissioner for the Judicial Selection Commission. Further, Colón holds the Vice President position for both the National Association of Latino Elected Officials ("NALEO") and the NAACP ABQ.

Colón is the Managing Partner of Singleton Schreiber’s New Mexico offices, practicing in the areas of transactional negotiations, personal injury, medical malpractice, inadequate security, products liability, insurance bad faith, and corporate transactions. Colón also has extensive experience in working with local, state and federal elected officials in order to assist individuals and organizations with their various agendas.

=== Chair of the New Mexico Democratic Party ===
Prior to his run for lieutenant governor, he served as chairman of the Democratic Party of New Mexico, resigning in October 2009 after serving two and a half years. During his tenure as chairman, Democrats picked up two Congressional seats, a United States Senate seat, six seats in the New Mexico Legislature, and a majority of the popular vote in the 2008 United States presidential election.

=== 2010 gubernatorial election ===
Brian Colón was the Democratic candidate for lieutenant governor of New Mexico in 2010, running alongside gubernatorial candidate and former Lieutenant Governor Diane Denish. Denish and Colón lost to Susana Martinez and John Sanchez, respectively, each by approximately seven percent of the total vote.

=== 2017 Albuquerque mayoral election ===
On January 25, 2017, Colón announced his campaign for mayor of Albuquerque. He was defeated in the general election on October 3, 2017.

=== New Mexico state auditor ===
On November 6, 2018, Colón was elected as the New Mexico state auditor in the general election after advancing from the primary on June 5, 2018.

=== New Mexico attorney general ===
On June 7, 2022, Colón lost the Democratic primary for 2022 New Mexico Attorney General election to Raúl Torrez 53.4% to 46.6%, or by about 9,000 votes.

Party political offices
Preceded by John Wertheim	Chair of the New Mexico Democratic Party; 2007–2009	Succeeded by Annadelle Sanchez; Acting
Political offices
Preceded by Wayne Johnson	Auditor of New Mexico; 2019–2023	Succeeded by Joseph Maestas
