= Juan Sanchez (politician) =

American politician (born 1991/1992)

Public Lands Commissioner-elect of New Mexico
- Assuming office January 1, 2027
- Governor: Deb Haaland (elect)
- Succeeding: Stephanie Garcia Richard

Personal details
- Born: 1991 or 1992 (age 34–35) Albuquerque, New Mexico, U.S.
- Party: Democratic
- Children: 2
- Education: New Mexico Highlands University (BA); University of New Mexico (MS, MUP)

Juan Sanchez (born 1991/1992) is an American politician from New Mexico who is currently the New Mexico Commissioner-elect of Public Lands.

Party political offices
Preceded by Stephanie Garcia Richard	Democratic nominee for Public Lands Commissioner of New Mexico; 2026	Most recent
Political offices
Preceded by Stephanie Garcia Richard	Public Lands Commissioner of New Mexico; Taking office 2027	Elect
