= Hector Balderas =

Former attorney general of New Mexico

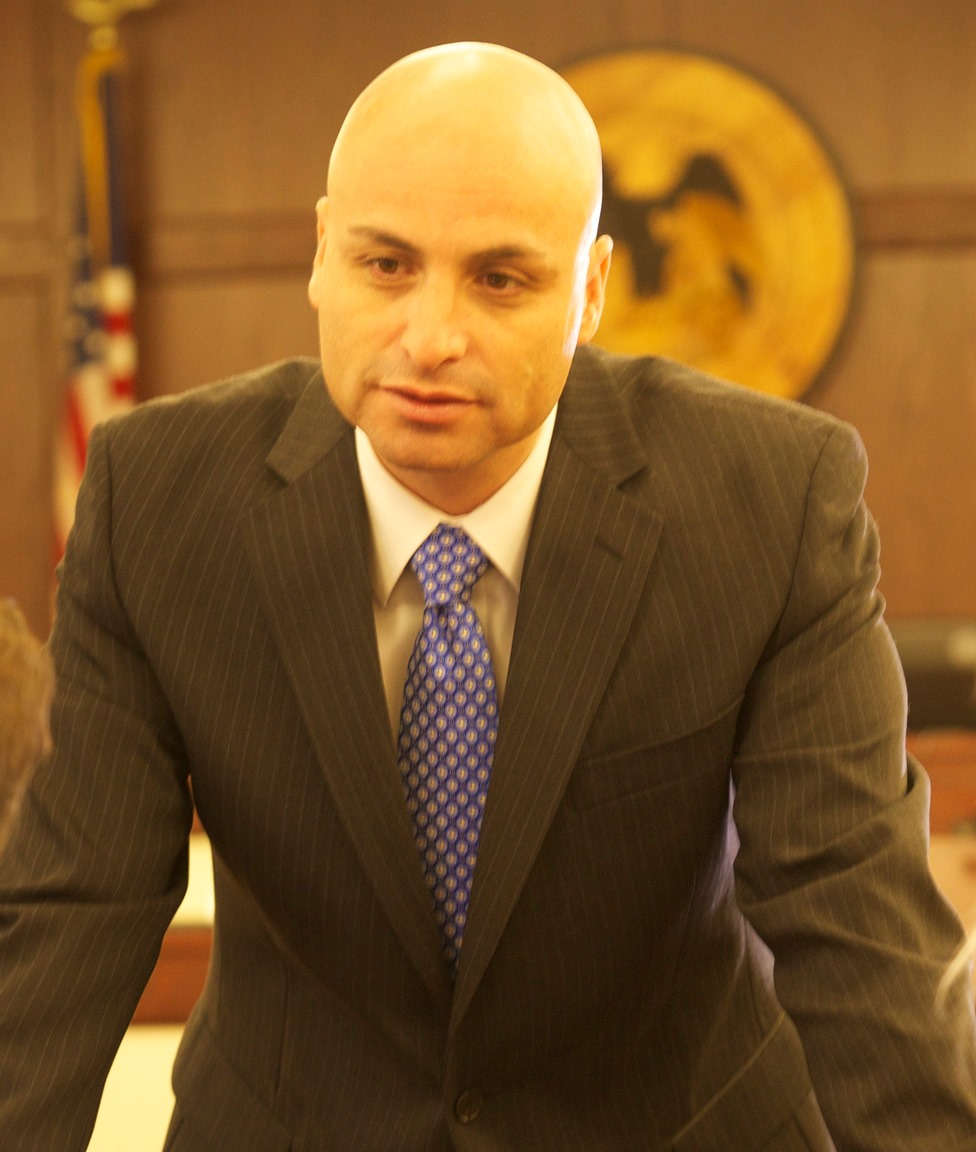

31st Attorney General of New Mexico
- In office January 1, 2015 – January 1, 2023
- Governor: Susana Martinez; Michelle Lujan Grisham
- Preceded by: Gary King
- Succeeded by: Raúl Torrez

25th Auditor of New Mexico
- In office January 1, 2007 – January 1, 2015
- Governor: Bill Richardson; Susana Martinez
- Preceded by: Domingo Martinez
- Succeeded by: Tim Keller

Member of the New Mexico House of Representatives from the 68th district
- In office January 2005 – December 2006
- Preceded by: Bengie Regensberg
- Succeeded by: Thomas Garcia

Personal details
- Born: Hector Hugo Balderas Jr. August 16, 1973 (age 53) Wagon Mound, New Mexico, U.S.
- Party: Democratic
- Spouse: Denise Balderas
- Children: 3
- Education: New Mexico Highlands University (BA); University of New Mexico (JD)

Hector Hugo Balderas Jr. (born August 16, 1973) is an American lawyer, executive leader, and politician currently serving as the president of Northern New Mexico College since 2023. Previously, he served as New Mexico Attorney General from 2015 to 2022, New Mexico State Auditor from 2007 to 2014, and in the New Mexico House of Representatives from 2005 to 2006.

== Early life and education ==
Balderas was raised by a single mother in the rural village of Wagon Mound, New Mexico. He attended Wagon Mound High School and participated in TRIO Upward Bound, a federally funded college prep program. Balderas pursued higher education, earning a bachelor's degree in political science from New Mexico Highlands University and a juris doctor degree from the University of New Mexico School of Law.

While attending the University of New Mexico School of Law, Balderas served as the council chair of the Graduate and Professional Student Association.

== Career ==
Balderas served from 2002 to 2003 as an assistant district attorney in Bernalillo County, then from 2003 to 2006 as special prosecutor for domestic violence cases in the 4th Judicial District of New Mexico.

=== New Mexico House of Representatives ===
In 2004, Balderas and his family returned to Wagon Mound. With no prior political experience, he launched a campaign for a seat in the New Mexico House of Representatives, defeating the incumbent in the Democratic primary by a two-to-one margin.

Among his most notable legislative achievements was his sponsorship of “truthful interrogations” legislation, a reform that required law enforcement to record in-house interrogations of suspected killers.

Balderas’s leadership and legislative accomplishments earned him national recognition, including being named Rookie Leader of the Year by the Greater Albuquerque Chamber of Commerce and Outstanding Rookie by the League of Conservation Voters for his work on energy development and environmental policy.

=== State Auditor ===
During his tenure, the Office of the State Auditor launched audits and investigations that uncovered financial mismanagement across state and local government. These included exposing fraudulent practices at New Mexico’s regional housing authorities, questionable public land deals by a former state land commissioner, misuse of state vehicles at the Public Regulation Commission, and over-billing by private contractors at the Corrections Department. He also led an investigation into the New Mexico Finance Authority, revealing the issuance of a fraudulent audit report.

Balderas led the special audit of Sunland Park, a border town long plagued by corruption. His audit uncovered widespread financial abuse by city officials, prompting the first-ever state takeover of a municipality in New Mexico’s history.

Balderas also uncovered the largest public school embezzlement scheme in New Mexico history, a $3.3 million fraud operation at the Jemez Mountain School District.

=== Attorney General ===
Elected as New Mexico’s Attorney General in 2014, Hector Balderas reorganized the Office of the Attorney General to prioritize public safety, corporate accountability, and consumer protection. He served two terms, being reelected in 2018.

Balderas led the case against New Mexico Secretary of State Dianna Duran, whom he charged with embezzlement, fraud, and money laundering after uncovering evidence that she had funneled campaign funds into personal accounts. She resigned and ultimately was convicted.

Balderas also took action against Sheryl Williams Stapleton, a Democratic state legislator and Albuquerque Public Schools administrator, after uncovering an illegal kickback scheme in which she steered more than $5.3 million in sole-source APS contracts to a shell company, Robotics Learning Management Systems. His investigation led to the seizure of nearly $450,000 from fraudulent accounts, and Stapleton resigned from the Legislature days after search warrants were executed at her home, office, and business. The FBI later expanded the investigation based on the evidence Balderas's office uncovered.

Balderas filed a federal lawsuit against the tech giant Google for illegally tracking and collecting personal data from schoolchildren through its education products. The lawsuit accused Google of violating the federal Children’s Online Privacy Protection Act (COPPA) and misleading parents, teachers, and students about its data-mining practices.

Balderas played a central role in the case against the Cancer Fund of America, a fraudulent charity that raised $187 million under false pretenses, giving donors the false impression they were helping cancer patients. His office’s efforts resulted in a multi-state settlement that permanently shut down the charity and banned its operators from working in nonprofit organizations.

Another notable prosecution was against Gary Gregor, a former elementary school teacher accused of sexually abusing students. Gregor had a long history of misconduct that was ignored by multiple school districts, a practice known as “passing the trash.” Balderas launched a grand jury investigation, leading to Gregor’s indictment and conviction.

Balderas also, in 2017, sued opioid manufacturers and distributors for deceptive marketing practices that fueled addiction across the state. He later sued Walgreens, Walmart, and Kroger, alleging that they had failed to prevent the illegal diversion of opioids.

In addition to legal action, Balderas launched Project OPEN (Opioid Prevention and Education Network) to train law enforcement officers and community leaders in overdose prevention and the use of Naloxone, an opioid-reversal drug.

Balderas played a pivotal role in securing $32 million in settlements for New Mexico communities impacted by the Gold King Mine spill, a 2015 environmental disaster caused by the Environmental Protection Agency (EPA) that polluted the Animas and San Juan Rivers.

He also led New Mexico’s legal battle against Texas over the Rio Grande water dispute. Texas had accused New Mexico of over-pumping groundwater, while New Mexico argued that it was being shorted on its fair share of water under longstanding compacts.

Balderas pushed for legislative solutions to organized retail crime, calling for the passage of the Organized Retail Crime Act to increase penalties for serial shoplifters. He also supported federal efforts including the INFORM Consumers Act, which sought to regulate online marketplaces that were being used to sell stolen goods.

=== President of Northern New Mexico College ===
In January 2023, Balderas was unanimously appointed President of Northern New Mexico College (NNMC) by the college’s Board of Regents. He has publicly spoken about accessible higher education as being one of the most powerful tools for breaking cycles of poverty and creating lasting change.

Balderas's Soaring to New Heights model led to a 14 percent enrollment increase in the fall of 2023 and a 24 percent increase in the spring of 2024. Balderas also secured over $10 million in legislative funding, the largest in NNMC’s history. He has worked to revitalize NNMC’s historic El Rito campus, transforming it into a hub for workforce training, the arts, and economic development. This included securing $700,000 to renovate student housing and partnering with Grandave Capital to establish a film studio, creating career pathways in media production.

Under Balderas's leadership, NNMC has expanded workforce partnerships, launching the Center for Information Technology and Cybersecurity in collaboration with Los Alamos National Laboratory and the National Nuclear Security Administration.

=== Other Positions ===
- Treasurer Board Member, National Association of Latino Elected and Appointed Officials (NALEO). NALEO is a national nonpartisan organization with a network of more than 6,000 governmental, political, and business leaders who conduct civic projects, training and technical assistance for the Latino community. There are 24 members on the board of directors.

== Honors and accolades ==
- Recipient of the 2011 Conservation Voters New Mexico Sunshine Award. Balderas was recognized for his steadfast work as State Auditor in rooting out fraud and corruption, and shining sunlight on the operations of state government. According to CVNM, his work resulted in millions of dollars of savings and the enforcement of key safeguards that protect New Mexico's natural resources.
- Recipient of the 2010 recipient John F. Kennedy New Frontier Award, which honors young Americans who are changing their community through a commitment to public service. He is the first New Mexican to receive the annual award. The award is presented annually to exceptional young Americans under the age of 40 whose contributions in elective office, community service or advocacy demonstrate the impact and value of public service in the spirit of John F. Kennedy.
- Recognized by Hispanic Business Magazine in 2007 as one of the nation's 100 most influential Hispanics.

== Personal life ==
Hector Balderas and his wife, Denise, have three children (Hector Reyes Jr., Arianna, and Mariola). Denise is an educator who trains educators and works in the disability community. Their daughter Arianna was born with Down syndrome, and Balderas has participated in the New Mexico Special Olympics annual torch run.

== Electoral history ==
New Mexico House of Representatives 68th District Democratic Primary Election, 2004
Party	Candidate	Votes	%
Democratic	Hector Balderas	2,788	56.06
Democratic	Bengie Regensberg (inc.)	1,427	28.69
Democratic	Severiano Sisneros Jr.	758	15.24

New Mexico House of Representatives 68th District Election, 2004
Party	Candidate	Votes	%
Democratic	Hector Balderas	6,655	61.76
Republican	Roger Gonzales	4,120	38.24

New Mexico Auditor Election, 2006
Party	Candidate	Votes	%
Democratic	Hector Balderas	298,143	54.77
Republican	Lorenzo Garcia	246,225	45.23

New Mexico Auditor Election, 2010
Party	Candidate	Votes	%
Democratic	Hector Balderas (inc.)	323,427	55.15
Republican	Errol Chavez	263,008	44.85

New Mexico U.S. Senate Democratic Primary Election, 2012
Party	Candidate	Votes	%
Democratic	Martin Heinrich	83,432	58.94
Democratic	Hector Balderas	58,128	41.06

New Mexico Attorney General Election, 2014
Party	Candidate	Votes	%
Democratic	Hector Balderas	295,008	58.27
Republican	Susan Riedel	211,303	41.73

New Mexico Attorney General Election, 2018
Party	Candidate	Votes	%
Democratic	Hector Balderas	427,583	61.08
Republican	Michael Hendricks	231,296	33.04

Political offices
Preceded by Domingo Martinez	Auditor of New Mexico; 2007–2015	Succeeded by Tim Keller
Legal offices
Preceded by Gary King	Attorney General of New Mexico; 2015–2023	Succeeded by Raúl Torrez
