= New Mexico State Auditor =

State Auditor of New Mexico
- Seal of New Mexico

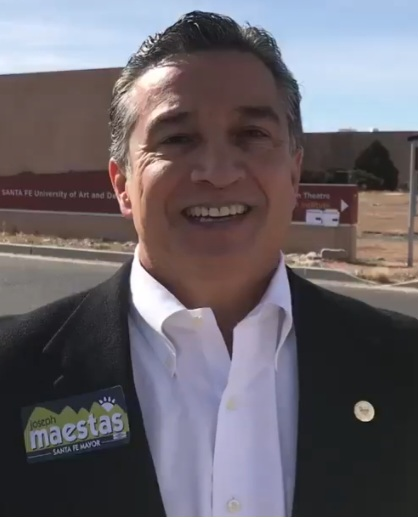
- Incumbent; Joseph Maestas since January 1, 2023
- Term length: Four years
- Formation: 1912
- First holder: William Sargent
- Website: Auditor of New Mexico

The state auditor of New Mexico is a constitutional officer in the executive branch of government of the U.S. state of New Mexico. Twenty-eight individuals have held the office of state auditor since statehood. The incumbent is Joseph Maestas, a Democrat.

== Eligibility and term of office ==
No person may be elected state auditor other than a United States citizen of at least 30 years of age who has resided continuously in New Mexico for five years preceding the election. The state auditor is elected to a four-year term and is able to serve up to two consecutive terms; more terms may be served after one full term has intervened.

== Powers and duties ==
The state auditor assures that the financial affairs of New Mexico's 1,200 or so local governments and state agencies are thoroughly examined and audited each year and may conduct, in whole or part, audits of any of the aforesaid public bodies at any time. Pursuant to this authority, the state auditor performs annual financial audits of public bodies or approves contracts entered into effect by public bodies with independent public accounting firms, otherwise known as "IPAs". Whenever an annual financial audit is performed by an independent public accounting firm rather than the Office of the State Auditor, staff in the Office of the State Auditor perform desk reviews of IPA audits for compliance with the Audit Rule duly promulgated by the state auditor. In addition, the state auditor conducts special investigations of fraud, waste, and abuse of public funds or resources; collects, analyzes, and visualizes state agency and local government financial data; and assists small local public bodies with satisfying their statutory financial reporting requirements. In the performance of official duties, the state auditor may administer oaths and issue subpoenas to compel the attendance of witnesses and the production of books and records.

Functional responsibilities aside, the state auditor is an ex officio member of the State Commission of Public Records. Likewise, the state auditor is constitutionally sixth in the line of succession to the governor's office after the lieutenant governor, the secretary of state, the president pro tempore of the Senate, the speaker of the House, and the attorney general.

== List of state auditors ==
#	Image	Name	Took office	Left office	Party	Years in office
1		William Sargent	1912	1918	Republican	7 (Note: Since the first state election was in an odd-numbered year (1911), the term lasted five years.)
2		Edward Sargent	1919	1920	Republican	2
3		Edward Safford	1921	1922	Republican	2
4		Juan Vigil	1923	1926	Democratic	4
5		Miguel Otero III	1927	1928	Republican	2
6		Victoriano Ulibarrí	1929	1930	Republican	2
7		Arsenio Velarde	1931	1934	Democratic	4
8		José García	1935	1938	Democratic	4
9		E. D. Trujillo	1939	1942	Democratic	4
10		J. D. Hannah	1943	1946	Democratic	4
11		E. D. Trujillo	1947	1950	Democratic	4
12		Robert Castner	1951	1954	Democratic	4
13		J. D. Hannah	1955	1957	Democratic	3 (Note: Died in office in July 1957.)
14		Ben Chávez	1957	1958	Republican	2 (Note: Appointed by Governor Mechem on August 12, 1957.)
15		Robert Castner	1959	1962	Democratic	4
16		Alex Armijo	1963	1966	Democratic	4
17		Harold Thompson	1967	1970	Republican	4
18		Frank Olmstead	1971	1974	Democratic	4
19		Max Sánchez	1975	1978	Democratic	4 (Note: Resigned on April 11, 1978.)
20		Alvino Castillo	1978	1982	Democratic	5 (Note: Appointed by Governor Apodaca in April 1978.)
21		Albert Romero	1983	1986	Democratic	4
22		Harroll Adams	1987	1990	Democratic	4
23		Robert E. Vigil	1991	1998	Democratic	8
24		Domingo Martinez	1999	2006	Democratic	8
25		Hector Balderas	2007	2014	Democratic	8
26		Tim Keller	2015	2017	Democratic	3 (Note: Resigned on November 30, 2017.)
27		Wayne Johnson	2017	2019	Republican	1 (Note: Appointed by Governor Martinez on December 1, 2017.)
28		Brian Colón	2019	2023	Democratic	4
29		Joseph Maestas	2023	present	Democratic	
