= Tim Keller (politician) =

American businessman and politician (born 1977)

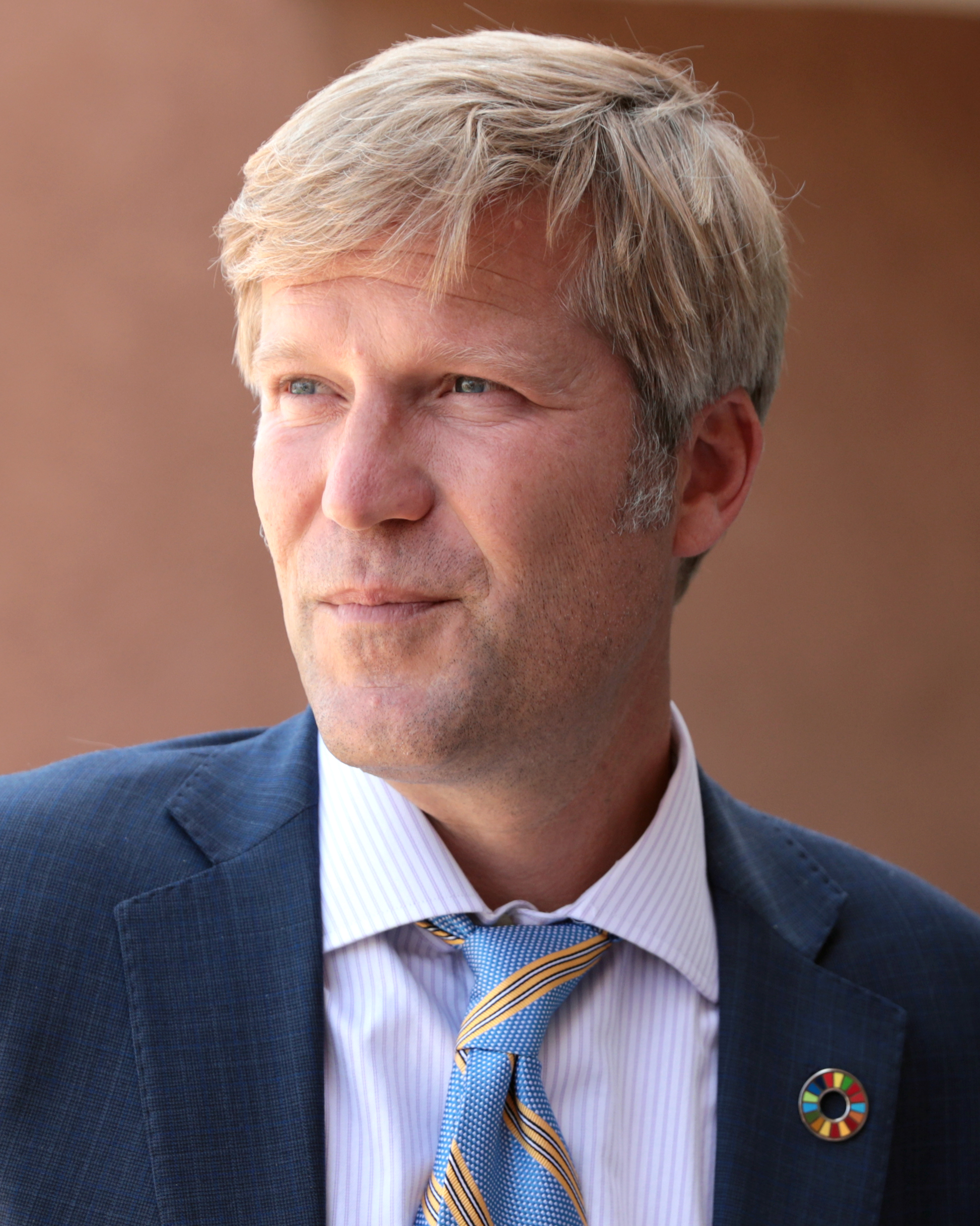

30th Mayor of Albuquerque
- Incumbent
- Assumed office December 1, 2017
- Preceded by: Richard J. Berry

26th Auditor of New Mexico
- In office January 5, 2015 – November 30, 2017
- Governor: Susana Martinez
- Preceded by: Hector Balderas
- Succeeded by: Wayne Johnson

Member of the New Mexico Senate from the 17th district
- In office January 3, 2009 – January 5, 2015
- Preceded by: Shannon Robinson
- Succeeded by: Mimi Stewart

Personal details
- Born: Timothy Matthew Keller; November 22, 1977 (age 48) Albuquerque, New Mexico, U.S.
- Party: Democratic
- Spouse: Elizabeth Kistin
- Children: 2
- Education: University of Notre Dame (BA); Harvard University (MBA)
- Website: Government website

Timothy Matthew Keller (born November 22, 1977) is an American businessman and politician serving as the 30th mayor of Albuquerque, New Mexico. A member of the Democratic Party, he served as New Mexico State auditor before resigning to become mayor on December 1, 2017. He is also a former member of the New Mexico State Senate, representing the 17th district. Keller was reelected in 2021 and again in 2025, becoming the first mayor in Albuquerque history to serve three consecutive terms.

== Early life and education ==
Keller was born and raised in Albuquerque, New Mexico. His father was a founder of Union Savings Bank and his mother was a public school teacher and homemaker. He was raised Catholic and, following his graduation from St. Pius X High School, attended the University of Notre Dame.^{[2]} Growing up, Keller struggled with dyslexia, though he was not diagnosed until graduate school. Keller earned a Master of Business Administration from Harvard Business School.

== Career ==
=== Early career ===
Before his political career, Keller worked in Cambodia, where he helped establish the country’s first tech company employing landmine survivors and victims of human trafficking. His commitment to global social enterprise shaped his early career and continues to influence his work today.

Keller is the founder of Digital Divide Data (DDD), which employs and trains disadvantaged persons in Cambodia.^{[3]} The organization was created to provide technology and employment opportunities for disadvantaged youth, including survivors of land mines and human trafficking. DDD is now also present in Laos and Kenya, and has more than 1000 employees. The organization was ranked by Fast Company magazine as a global Top Innovator and by The Global Journal as one of the Top 100 NGOs worldwide.^{[4]}

After graduating from business school, Keller returned to New Mexico where he worked in the community, volunteering for groups that foster economic opportunities in Albuquerque's International District. Keller has served on the boards of the Open Hands Foundation, the Asian American Association, and Albuquerque Southeast Team for Entrepreneur Development. Additionally, Keller spent fifteen years in the private sector, initially in strategic planning for fortune 500 companies and most recently helping Native American governmental financial operations.

In 2025, Tim Keller was elected to a historic third term as Mayor of Albuquerque, making him the first mayor in the city’s history to serve three consecutive terms since its founding in 1706.

During his tenure, he has continued to push for reforms, including the expansion and continued operation of the Albuquerque Community Safety Department.

=== New Mexico Senate ===
Keller was elected in 2008 to represent the people of New Mexico Senate District 17, otherwise known as the International District. In the 49th Legislative Session, Keller introduced 30 pieces of legislation passing 8; 4 of which were signed into law by Governor Bill Richardson.

In the 2011–12 50th Legislative Session, Keller introduced 55 pieces of legislation, passed 14 pieces of legislation, and 5 were signed into law by Governor Susana Martinez including reforming the In-State Business Preference that gives local businesses bidding preference on state government procurement. In December 2012, Keller was elected to the New Mexico State Senate leadership as Majority Whip and served two years until resigning after his election to State Auditor.

=== New Mexico auditor ===
==== 2014 election ====
Keller announced in spring 2013 that he would seek the office of New Mexico State Auditor. During the election, Keller released a commercial that received national attention for its theming around the television series Breaking Bad. On November 4, 2014 Keller was elected State Auditor, defeating Robert Aragon, 54%-46%.

==== Tenure ====
Keller served as New Mexico's elected State Auditor from January 2015 through November 2017 when he resigned to assume his role as Mayor of Albuquerque. As Auditor, he primarily focused on helping government work better by providing transparency and accountability for government spending; informing policy choices; and tackling fraud, waste and abuse.^{[14]}

These initiatives included:

- A special audit of New Mexico's backlog of untested Sexual Assault Evidence Kits, commonly known as “rape kits” ^{[15]}
- Investigating a lack of oversight, doctored receipts at La Promesa Charter School ^{[17]}
- Discovering preferential tax treatment and abuse of power which ultimately led to the resignation and potential prosecution of State Tax and Revenue Secretary
- Money on the Sidelines: Report on Unspent Fund Balances. ^{[29]}
- Discovering financial mismanagement at the University of New Mexico Athletics Department, costing the institution hundreds of thousands of dollars.
- A financial audit of the New Mexico Office of the Superintendent of Insurance that rendered 31 findings that ultimately led to a better run agency.

=== 2017 Albuquerque mayoral campaign ===
In January 2017, Keller announced his intention to run in that year's Albuquerque mayoral election to fight for a safe, inclusive and innovative city. He stated that he would pursue public financing for his campaign by initially raising thousands of five-dollar donations, and pledged to expand the city's Police Department from around 850 officers to 1,200 if elected. As of May 2024, the Albuquerque Police Department had 885 sworn officers, according to police chief Harold Medina. Of the final eight candidates to make the Mayoral ballot, Keller was the only one to receive public financing, collecting nearly 6,000 five-dollar donations from the community, an impressive organizing feat. Keller would receive roughly $380,000 from the city to run his campaign, while his opponents would have no cap to the amount of money they could raise.

Throughout the course of the Election, Keller took part in multitudes of debates and forums, ranging from the standard televised debates for local channels, KRQE and KOB, as well as community based such as MIABQ's Forum for Young People, Young Professionals and Young Families, Dukes Up #RealTalk Forum and the Weekly Alibi's candidate Q&A.

On October 3, Keller topped the ballot with 39 percent of the vote, 16 percentage points ahead of the second-placed candidate, Republican Albuquerque City Councilman Dan Lewis, whom Keller would face in a runoff election in November.

Seen as the front-runner, Keller continued to garner broad support from across the city, including endorsements from the Fraternal Order of Police, recognition for his bipartisan work as Auditor and Senator, and his pragmatic vision for the city's future.

In the Albuquerque mayoral runoff election on November 14, 2017, Keller defeated Lewis with 62% of the vote. Keller resigned from his position as State Auditor on November 30, 2017.

=== 2021 Albuquerque mayoral campaign ===
In November 2021, Keller won reelection to a second term. He faced Manny Gonzales, a Democratic sheriff, and Eddy Aragon, a Republican radio host. Keller received 56% of the vote, winning outright rather than needing a runoff election because he achieved a majority.

=== Mayor of Albuquerque ===
==== Inauguration ====
On December 1, 2017, Keller was sworn in as the 30th mayor of Albuquerque. Keller named the first female chief administrative officer, Sarita Nair.

After assuming office, Keller appointed new leadership at the Albuquerque Police Department. On November 28, 2017, Mayor Keller announced he would be naming Michael Geier as interim Chief-of-Police. In addition, Harold Medina, Rogelio "Roger" Banez, and Eric Garcia were named deputy chiefs.

==== Sustainability ====
Mayor Keller issued an executive order for the City of Albuquerque to use 100% renewable energy by 2030. including building a large solar farm on the nearby Jicarilla Reservation.

==== Community safety ====
Mayor Keller updated emergency response by creating the Albuquerque Community Safety Department, a nationally recognized program that dispatches trained professionals to non-violent 911 calls involving mental health, substance use, and homelessness. The initiative was designed to improve response outcomes while freeing up police resources for higher-priority criminal enforcement.

Under Keller’s leadership, the Albuquerque Community Safety Department expanded significantly. In 2025, it responded to over 42,000 calls and freed up more than 31,000 hours of police and fire service time.

By 2026, the department opened a second training academy and established a new office at the Alvarado Transit Hub. These expansions reflect an ongoing effort to shift appropriate emergency responses away from law enforcement and toward specialized non-police professionals.

In April 2021, Keller’s administration also announced the clearance of the city’s backlog of untested rape kits.

==== Homeless population ====
During Keller's second term, Albuquerque's homeless population increased year-over-year. In 2021, the city's homeless population was 1,152, increasing 13.8% in 2022 to 1,311. In 2023, the city's homeless population was 2,394, an 83% increase from 2022. As of 2025, Albuquerque's homeless population is 2,960, representing a 40% increase over two years. Shelter bed usage increased by 18% from 1,125 to 1,327 over the same time period, meaning the increase in homelessness is outpacing shelter usage by 2-to-1.

==== City improvements ====
Mayor Keller established the Gateway Center in 2023, achieving full capacity in late 2025. The center aims to help 1,000 people per day, and the largest investment focused on helping the unhoused, addicted and people with mental health issues in state history.

During Mayor Keller's time as Mayor the City of Albuquerque has invested over $200 million in new parks, libraries, housing, splash pads, street lights, road repairs, and community centers in underserved and historic neighborhoods.

==== Entertainment industry ====
Keller's tenure as mayor has seen increased activity of the film and television industry. Netflix's first ever production facility was opened in the city in 2018 and received a major expansion in 2024. NBCUniversal opened a facility in 2021 that was slated to provide 330 full-time equivalent jobs.

In 2022, Keller helped unveil statues of Bryan Cranston and Aaron Paul as Walter White and Jesse Pinkman, their characters from the Albuquerque-based television series Breaking Bad, at the Albuquerque Convention Center. The statues were commissioned by showrunner Vince Gilligan. Keller also had a cameo appearance as himself in the fourth episode of the science fiction series Pluribus created by Gilligan, with episodes airing a few weeks before the runoff for the 2025 mayoral election.

== Awards and recognition ==
Keller was featured in a Harvard Business School case study titled "In That Crucible, You Find Innovation," which examined Albuquerque’s transformation of its 911 response system through the Albuquerque Community Safety program.

In 2022, Keller received the Antonio Villaraigosa Leadership Award from the Latino Leaders Network in recognition of his leadership and public service in majority-Latino communities.

In 2026, Keller received the Public Leadership in the Arts Award from Americans for the Arts and the United States Conference of Mayors for advancing arts and cultural initiatives in Albuquerque.

Keller's public safety initiatives, including the Albuquerque Community Safety Department, were the subject of a Harvard Business School case study titled In That Crucible, You Find Innovation: Public Safety Transformation in Albuquerque.

== Personal life ==
An avid football player, Keller played quarterback for Albuquerque's professional indoor football team, the Duke City Gladiators, for their 2018 season opener. He is also an advocate for dyslexia awareness after being diagnosed with the disorder himself and re-learning various reading and processing skills as an adult.

Keller is an avid fan of heavy metal music and was profiled as the “#MetalMayor” by The New York Times and has introduced a number of bands live on stage in Albuquerque. He is particularly fond of the thrash, progressive, and glam sub-genres of heavy metal, with Anthrax, Battlecross, Guns N' Roses, Metallica, Mötley Crüe, Pantera, Sepultura, System of a Down, Testament, and Trivium being among his favorite bands and has commented that his love for the genre has impacted many areas of his life, including his dedication to public service.

== Media ==
In 2025, Keller made a guest appearance as himself in the television series Pluribus. The show was filmed in Albuquerque and the appearance referenced his role as mayor, reflecting the city’s growing film and television industry.

== Electoral history ==
New Mexico State Senate 17th District Democratic Primary Election, 2008
Party	Candidate	Votes	%
Democratic	Tim Keller	1,614	66%
Democratic	Shannon Robinson	832	34%

New Mexico State Senate 17th District Election, 2008
Party	Candidate	Votes	%
Democratic	Tim Keller	9,275	100%

New Mexico State Senate 17th District Democratic Primary Election, 2012
Party	Candidate	Votes	%
Democratic	Tim Keller (inc.)	7,481	65%
Republican	Shannon Robinson	4,057	35%

New Mexico Auditor Election, 2014
Party	Candidate	Votes	%
Democratic	Tim Keller	270,386	54%
Republican	Robert Aragon	228,019	46%

Mayor of Albuquerque 2017 Election Results
Party	Candidate	Votes	%
Democrat	Tim Keller	38,156	39%
Republican	Dan Lewis	22,238	23%
Democrat	Brian Colon	15,884	16%
Republican	Wayne Johnson	9,342	10%
Democrat	Augustus "Gus" Pedrotty	6,638	7%
Independent	Michelle Garcia Holmes	3,748	4%
Independent	Susan Wheeler-Deichsel	490	1%
Republican	Ricardo Chavez	475	0%
	Total Votes	96,971	100%

Albuquerque Mayoral Runoff Election, 2017
Party	Candidate	Votes	%
Democratic	Tim Keller	60,219	62%
Republican	Dan Lewis	36,594	38%

Mayor of Albuquerque 2021 Election Results
Party	Candidate	Votes	%
Democrat	Tim Keller	66,251	56%
Democrat	Manuel Gonzales III	30,337	25%
Republican	Eddy Aragon	21,815	18%
	Total Votes	118,403	100%

Mayor of Albuquerque 2025 Election Results
Party	Candidate	Votes	%
Democratic	Tim Keller (inc.)	74,472	57.71%
Republican	Darren White	54,564	42.29%
Total Votes			129,036

== Filmography ==
=== Television ===
Year	Title	Role	Notes
2025	Pluribus	Himself	Episode: "Please, Carol"

In 2025, Keller made a guest appearance as himself in the television series Pluribus. This role brought his governance style to a wider audience and underscored his connection to the community.

== See also ==
- List of mayors of the 50 largest cities in the United States

Political offices
Preceded by Hector Balderas	Auditor of New Mexico; 2015–2017	Succeeded by Wayne Johnson
Preceded by Richard J. Berry	Mayor of Albuquerque; 2017–present	Incumbent
