= List of governors of New Mexico =

The governor of New Mexico is the head of government of New Mexico and the commander-in-chief of the state's military forces. The governor has a duty to enforce state laws, the power to either approve or veto bills passed by the New Mexico Legislature, to convene the legislature at any time, and to grant pardons.

Twenty-eight individuals have held the office of governor of New Mexico since the state's admission to the Union in 1912, two of whom—Edwin L. Mechem and Bruce King—served three non-consecutive terms. King holds the record as New Mexico's longest-serving governor, with 12 years of service. William C. McDonald, the first governor, took office on January 15, 1912. The first woman to serve as Governor was Republican Susana Martinez, who served from 2011 to 2019. The current officeholder is Michelle Lujan Grisham, who took office on January 1, 2019, as the first elected female Democratic governor of the state.

== List of governors ==
On August 18, 1846, American forces led by Stephen W. Kearny captured Santa Fe, capital of the Mexican territory of Santa Fe de Nuevo México. A code of laws known as the Kearny Code was established on September 22, 1846. The region remained under military control until formally annexed by the United States on July 4, 1848. Following Kearny's departure for California on September 26, the chief military officer in the territory was Col. Sterling Price until October 11, 1848; Lt. Col. John M. Washington until October 23, 1849; and Col. John Munroe until the territory was organized.

Kearny appointed Charles Bent as governor before he left for California; Bent would be assassinated during the Taos Revolt on January 19, 1847. Col. Price appointed Donaciano Vigil as acting governor. A statehood convention chose Henry Connelly as governor on June 20, 1850, but this was never recognized by the federal government.

=== Territory of New Mexico ===
New Mexico Territory was organized on December 13, 1850. It would remain a territory for 62 years.

Governors of the Territory of New Mexico
No.	Governor	Term in office (Note: The range given is from the date the governor was confirmed by the Senate, or appointed by the President during a Senate recess, to the date the governor's successor was confirmed, unless noted.)	Appointed by
1	James Calhoun (1802–1852)	January 9, 1851 (Note: Calhoun was nominated on December 23, 1850; confirmed by the Senate on January 9, 1851; and was inaugurated on March 3, 1851.) – July 2, 1852 (541 days; died in office) (Note: Calhoun left the territory on May 6, 1852, and died on July 2; Territorial Secretary John Greiner acted as governor until his successor arrived.)	Millard Fillmore
2	William Carr Lane (1789–1863)	July 15, 1852 (Note: Lane was nominated and confirmed by the Senate on July 15, 1852, and was inaugurated on September 13.) – May 6, 1853 (296 days; replaced) (Note: Lane had a resignation letter ready, and some sources say he resigned, but the nomination of his successor specified that he was being removed.)	Millard Fillmore
3	David Meriwether (1800–1893)	May 6, 1853 (Note: Solon Borland was nominated and confirmed by the Senate on April 8, 1853, but declined the post. Meriwether was appointed on May 6, 1853, during a Senate recess; and was formally nominated and confirmed by the Senate on February 4, 1854. He was inaugurated on August 8, 1853.) – August 17, 1857 (1565 days; replaced) (Note: Meriwether left the territory in May 1857, after which time Territorial Secretary William W. H. Davis acted as governor until he too left the territory in October.)	Franklin Pierce
4	Abraham Rencher (1798–1883)	August 17, 1857 (Note: Rencher was appointed on August 17, 1857, during a Senate recess; nominated on December 19, 1857; and confirmed by the Senate on January 18, 1858. He arrived in the territory on November 11, 1857.) – May 24, 1861 (1377 days; replaced)	James Buchanan
5	Henry Connelly (1800–1866)	May 24, 1861 (Note: Connelly was appointed on May 24, 1861, during a Senate recess; nominated on July 10; but was rejected by the Senate on July 17. He was reappointed on September 4, 1861, during a Senate recess; nominated on December 23, 1861; and confirmed by the Senate on July 16, 1862.) – January 15, 1866 (1698 days; replaced) (Note: Connelly left the territory from fall 1862 to May 1863; Territorial Secretary William F. M. Arny acted as governor during this time.)	Abraham Lincoln
6	Robert Byington Mitchell (1823–1882)	January 15, 1866 (Note: Mitchell was nominated on December 21, 1865; confirmed by the Senate on January 15, 1866; and took office on July 16, 1866.) – May 28, 1869 (1230 days; resigned) (Note: The nomination of Mitchell's successor specifies that he resigned.) (Note: Mitchell left the territory in November 1866 for almost four months; Territorial Secretary William F. M. Arny acted as governor during this time.)	Andrew Johnson
7	William A. Pile (1829–1889)	May 28, 1869 (Note: Pile was appointed on May 28, 1869, during a Senate recess; nominated on December 6; and confirmed by the Senate on December 21. He took office on August 16, 1869.) – July 27, 1871 (791 days; replaced)	Ulysses S. Grant
8	Marsh Giddings (1816–1875)	July 27, 1871 (Note: Willard Warner was nominated and confirmed by the Senate on May 19, 1871, but declined the post. Giddings was appointed on July 27, 1871, during a Senate recess; nominated on December 6; and confirmed by the Senate on December 14. He arrived in the territory on September 1.) – June 3, 1875 (1408 days; died in office) (Note: After Giddings' death, Territorial Secretary William G. Ritch acted as governor until his successor arrived.)	Ulysses S. Grant
9	Samuel Beach Axtell (1819–1891)	June 8, 1875 (Note: Axtell was appointed on June 8, 1875, during a Senate recess; nominated on December 9; and confirmed by the Senate on December 16. He arrived in the territory on July 30.) – September 4, 1878 (1185 days; removed) (Note: Axtell was suspended by United States Secretary of the Interior Carl Schurz for mishandling the widespread violence in the territory.)	Ulysses S. Grant
10	Lew Wallace (1827–1905)	September 4, 1878 (Note: Wallace was appointed on September 4, 1878, during a Senate recess; nominated on December 4; and confirmed by the Senate on December 16. He arrived in the territory on September 29, and was sworn in the next day.) – May 5, 1881 (975 days; resigned) (Note: Wallace resigned, disillusioned with the violence in the territory and the power held by the "Santa Fe Ring".)	Rutherford B. Hayes
11	Lionel Allen Sheldon (1828–1917)	May 5, 1881 (Note: Sheldon was nominated on March 23, 1881; confirmed by the Senate on May 5; and arrived in the territory on July 4.) – May 23, 1885 (1480 days; replaced)	James A. Garfield
12	Edmund G. Ross (1826–1907)	May 23, 1885 (Note: Ross was appointed on May 23, 1885, during a Senate recess; nominated on December 10, 1885; and confirmed by the Senate on April 20, 1886. He was sworn in on June 15, 1885.) – April 2, 1889 (1411 days; replaced)	Grover Cleveland
13	L. Bradford Prince (1840–1922)	April 2, 1889 (Note: Prince was nominated on April 1, 1889; confirmed by the Senate on April 2; and was inaugurated on April 17.) – April 7, 1893 (1467 days; replaced)	Benjamin Harrison
14	William Taylor Thornton (1843–1916)	April 7, 1893 (Note: Thornton was nominated on April 5, 1893; confirmed by the Senate on April 7; and took office on April 20.) – April 5, 1897 (1460 days; resigned) (Note: Thornton submitted his resignation on April 2, 1897, and left the territory on April 5. No reason is recorded for his resignation; though it was the day after a high-profile execution. Territorial Secretary Loren Miller acted as governor until his successor arrived.)	Grover Cleveland
15	Miguel Antonio Otero (1859–1944)	June 2, 1897 (Note: Otero was nominated on June 2, 1897; confirmed by the Senate on June 5; and was inaugurated on July 14. He was reconfirmed by the Senate on January 22, 1902.) – January 10, 1906 (3144 days; replaced)	William McKinley
15	Miguel Antonio Otero (1859–1944)	June 2, 1897 – January 10, 1906 (3144 days; replaced)	Theodore Roosevelt
16	Herbert James Hagerman (1871–1935)	January 10, 1906 (Note: Hagerman was nominated on December 6, 1905; confirmed by the Senate on January 10, 1906; and took office on January 22, 1906.) – May 3, 1907 (479 days; resigned) (Note: President Theodore Roosevelt demanded Hagerman's resignation in April 1907 due to political pressure and controversial purchases. Territorial Secretary J. W. Raynolds acted as governor until his successor arrived.)	Theodore Roosevelt
17	George Curry (1861–1947)	May 27, 1907 (Note: Curry was appointed on May 27, 1907, during a Senate recess; nominated on December 3, 1907; and confirmed by the Senate on January 14, 1908. He took office on August 8, 1907.) – March 1, 1910 (1010 days; resigned) (Note: Curry resigned due to disagreements with United States Secretary of the Interior Richard A. Ballinger.)	Theodore Roosevelt
18	William J. Mills (1849–1915)	March 1, 1910 (Note: Mills was nominated on December 10, 1909 for a term to begin March 1, 1910; confirmed by the Senate on December 20, 1909; and took office on March 1, 1910.) – January 14, 1912 (685 days; statehood) (Note: Mills served as governor until statehood, and ran unsuccessfully for one of the first United States Senate seats for New Mexico.)	William Howard Taft

=== State of New Mexico ===
The state of New Mexico was admitted to the Union on January 6, 1912.

The state constitution of 1912 called for the election of a governor and lieutenant governor every four years. The term was changed to two years by a 1914 amendment, and lengthened back to four years in 1970. Governors originally could not succeed themselves; this was changed in 1914 to allow governors to succeed themselves once before having to take a term off. With the lengthening of the term to four years in 1970, this was changed back to prohibiting them from succeeding themselves, but in 1986 it was lengthened back to two terms. A 1962 amendment made it so that the governor and lieutenant governor are elected on a ticket (election). In the event of a vacancy in the office of governor, the lieutenant governor becomes governor.

Governors of the State of New Mexico
No.	Governor	Term in office	Party	Election	Lt. Governor (Note: Lieutenant governors represented the same party as their governor unless noted.)
1	William C. McDonald (1858–1918)	January 15, 1912 – January 1, 1917 (1814 days; term-limited) (Note: Under a 1914 amendment to the constitution, governors were ineligible for two years after having served two consecutive terms.)	Democratic	1911	Ezequiel Cabeza De Baca
2	Ezequiel Cabeza De Baca (1864–1917)	January 1, 1917 – February 18, 1917 (49 days; died in office)	Democratic	1916	Washington Ellsworth Lindsey (Note: Represented the Republican Party)
3	Washington Ellsworth Lindsey (1862–1926)	February 18, 1917 – January 1, 1919 (683 days; lost nomination)	Republican	Succeeded from lieutenant governor	Vacant
4	Octaviano Ambrosio Larrazolo (1859–1930)	January 1, 1919 – January 1, 1921 (732 days; lost nomination)	Republican	1918	Benjamin F. Pankey
5	Merritt C. Mechem (1870–1946)	January 1, 1921 – January 1, 1923 (731 days; retired)	Republican	1920	William H. Duckworth
6	James F. Hinkle (1862–1951)	January 1, 1923 – January 1, 1925 (732 days; retired)	Democratic	1922	José A. Baca (died May 17, 1924)
6	James F. Hinkle (1862–1951)	January 1, 1923 – January 1, 1925 (732 days; retired)	Democratic	1922	Vacant
7	Arthur T. Hannett (1884–1966)	January 1, 1925 – January 1, 1927 (731 days; lost election)	Democratic	1924	Edward G. Sargent
8	Richard C. Dillon (1877–1966)	January 1, 1927 – January 1, 1931 (1462 days; term-limited)	Republican	1926	Edward G. Sargent
8	Richard C. Dillon (1877–1966)	January 1, 1927 – January 1, 1931 (1462 days; term-limited)	Republican	1928	Hugh B. Woodward (resigned July 1929)
8	Richard C. Dillon (1877–1966)	January 1, 1927 – January 1, 1931 (1462 days; term-limited)	Republican	1928	Vacant
9	Arthur Seligman (1871–1933)	January 1, 1931 – September 25, 1933 (999 days; died in office)	Democratic	1930	Andrew W. Hockenhull
9	Arthur Seligman (1871–1933)	January 1, 1931 – September 25, 1933 (999 days; died in office)	Democratic	1932	Andrew W. Hockenhull
10	Andrew W. Hockenhull (1877–1974)	September 25, 1933 – January 1, 1935 (464 days; retired)	Democratic	Succeeded from lieutenant governor	Vacant
11	Clyde Tingley (1881–1960)	January 1, 1935 – January 1, 1939 (1462 days; term-limited)	Democratic	1934	Louis Cabeza de Baca
11	Clyde Tingley (1881–1960)	January 1, 1935 – January 1, 1939 (1462 days; term-limited)	Democratic	1936	Hiram M. Dow
12	John E. Miles (1884–1971)	January 1, 1939 (Note: The constitutional start date of the term was January 1; however, in 1939 this was a Sunday, so Miles was sworn in the next day.) – January 1, 1943 (1462 days; term-limited)	Democratic	1938	James Murray Sr.
12	John E. Miles (1884–1971)	January 1, 1939 – January 1, 1943 (1462 days; term-limited)	Democratic	1940	Ceferino Quintana
13	John J. Dempsey (1879–1958)	January 1, 1943 – January 1, 1947 (1462 days; term-limited) (Note: Dempsey, being term-limited, had already lost the Democratic nomination to the United States Senate when his term ended.)	Democratic	1942	James B. Jones
13	John J. Dempsey (1879–1958)	January 1, 1943 – January 1, 1947 (1462 days; term-limited)	Democratic	1944	James B. Jones
14	Thomas J. Mabry (1884–1962)	January 1, 1947 – January 1, 1951 (1462 days; term-limited)	Democratic	1946	Joseph Montoya
14	Thomas J. Mabry (1884–1962)	January 1, 1947 – January 1, 1951 (1462 days; term-limited)	Democratic	1948	Joseph Montoya
15	Edwin L. Mechem (1912–2002)	January 1, 1951 – January 1, 1955 (1462 days; term-limited)	Republican	1950	Tibo J. Chávez (Note: Represented the Democratic Party)
15	Edwin L. Mechem (1912–2002)	January 1, 1951 – January 1, 1955 (1462 days; term-limited)	Republican	1952	Tibo J. Chávez
16	John F. Simms (1916–1975)	January 1, 1955 – January 1, 1957 (732 days; lost election)	Democratic	1954	Joseph Montoya (resigned April 9, 1957)
17	Edwin L. Mechem (1912–2002)	January 1, 1957 – January 1, 1959 (731 days; lost election)	Republican	1956	Joseph Montoya (resigned April 9, 1957)
17	Edwin L. Mechem (1912–2002)	January 1, 1957 – January 1, 1959 (731 days; lost election)	Republican	1956	Vacant
18	John Burroughs (1907–1978)	January 1, 1959 – January 1, 1961 (732 days; lost election)	Democratic	1958	Ed V. Mead
19	Edwin L. Mechem (1912–2002)	January 1, 1961 (Note: The constitutional start date of the term was January 1; however, in 1961 this was a Sunday, so Mechem was sworn in the next day.) – November 30, 1962 (699 days; resigned) (Note: Mechem resigned to be appointed to the United States Senate by his successor; he had already lost reelection.)	Republican	1960	Tom Bolack
20	Tom Bolack (1918–1998)	November 30, 1962 – January 1, 1963 (33 days; retired)	Republican	Succeeded from lieutenant governor	Vacant
21	Jack M. Campbell (1916–1999)	January 1, 1963 – January 1, 1967 (1462 days; term-limited)	Democratic	1962	Mack Easley
21	Jack M. Campbell (1916–1999)	January 1, 1963 – January 1, 1967 (1462 days; term-limited)	Democratic	1964	Mack Easley
22	David Cargo (1929–2013)	January 1, 1967 – January 1, 1971 (1462 days; term-limited)	Republican	1966	Lee Francis
22	David Cargo (1929–2013)	January 1, 1967 – January 1, 1971 (1462 days; term-limited)	Republican	1968	Lee Francis
23	Bruce King (1924–2009)	January 1, 1971 – January 1, 1975 (1462 days; term-limited) (Note: Under a 1970 amendment to the constitution, governors were ineligible to succeed themselves.)	Democratic	1970	Roberto Mondragón
24	Jerry Apodaca (1934–2023)	January 1, 1975 – January 1, 1979 (1462 days; term-limited)	Democratic	1974	Robert E. Ferguson
25	Bruce King (1924–2009)	January 1, 1979 – January 1, 1983 (1462 days; term-limited)	Democratic	1978	Roberto Mondragón
26	Toney Anaya (b. 1941)	January 1, 1983 – January 1, 1987 (1462 days; term-limited)	Democratic	1982	Mike Runnels
27	Garrey Carruthers (b. 1939)	January 1, 1987 – January 1, 1991 (1462 days; term-limited)	Republican	1986	Jack L. Stahl
28	Bruce King (1924–2009)	January 1, 1991 – January 1, 1995 (1462 days; lost election)	Democratic	1990	Casey Luna
29	Gary Johnson (b. 1953)	January 1, 1995 – January 1, 2003 (2923 days; term-limited) (Note: Under a 1986 amendment to the constitution, governors who have served two terms are ineligible until another term has passed.)	Republican	1994	Walter Dwight Bradley
29	Gary Johnson (b. 1953)	January 1, 1995 – January 1, 2003 (2923 days; term-limited)	Republican	1998	Walter Dwight Bradley
30	Bill Richardson (1947–2023)	January 1, 2003 – January 1, 2011 (2923 days; term-limited)	Democratic	2002	Diane Denish
30	Bill Richardson (1947–2023)	January 1, 2003 – January 1, 2011 (2923 days; term-limited)	Democratic	2006	Diane Denish
31	Susana Martinez (b. 1959)	January 1, 2011 – January 1, 2019 (2923 days; term-limited)	Republican	2010	John Sanchez
31	Susana Martinez (b. 1959)	January 1, 2011 – January 1, 2019 (2923 days; term-limited)	Republican	2014	John Sanchez
32	Michelle Lujan Grisham (b. 1959)	January 1, 2019 – Incumbent (Note: Lujan Grisham's second term began on January 1, 2023, and will expire January 1, 2027; she is term-limited.) (in office 2883 days)	Democratic	2018	Howie Morales
32	Michelle Lujan Grisham (b. 1959)	January 1, 2019 – Incumbent (in office 2883 days)	Democratic	2022	Howie Morales
33	Deb Haaland (b. 1960)	Governor-elect takes office January 1, 2027	Democratic	2026	Stephanie Garcia Richard

== See also ==
- Gubernatorial lines of succession in the United States § New Mexico
- List of Mexican governors of New Mexico
- List of Spanish governors of New Mexico
- Lieutenant Governor of New Mexico

== Sources ==
- "Former New Mexico Governors". National Governors Association.
- "New Mexico Constitution". State Democracy Research Initiative. University of Wisconsin Law School.
- Glashan, Roy R. (1979). American Governors and Gubernatorial Elections, 1775-1978. Meckler Books. ISBN 0-7201-1511-6 – via Internet Archive.
- Kallenbach, Joseph E.; Kallenbach, Jessamine S. (1977). American State Governors, 1776-1976. Oceana Publications. ISBN 978-0-379-00665-0 – via Internet Archive.
- McMullin, Thomas A.; Walker, David (1984). Biographical Directory of American Territorial Governors. Meckler Publishing. ISBN 0-930466-11-X – via Internet Archive.
- Mullaney, Marie Marmo (1994). Biographical Directory of the Governors of the United States, 1988–1994. Greenwood Publishing Group. ISBN 0-313-28312-5 – via Internet Archive.
- Sobel, Robert; Raimo, John (1978). Biographical Directory of the Governors of the United States, 1789-1978. Vol. 3. Meckler Books. ISBN 0-930466-01-2 – via Internet Archive.
- Thorpe, Francis Newton, ed. (1909). The Federal and State Constitutions, Colonial Charters, and Other Organic Laws of the States, Territories, and Colonies Now or Heretofore Forming the United States of America. Vol. 5. United States Government Publishing Office – via Internet Archive.
