= Republican Party of New Mexico =

New Mexico affiliate of the Republican Party

- Chairperson: Amy Barela
- Senate Leader: William Sharer
- House Leader: Gail Armstrong
- Headquarters: 5150-A San Francisco Road NE; Albuquerque, New Mexico 87109
- Membership (August 27, 2025): 408,256
- Ideology: Conservatism
- National affiliation: Republican Party
- Colors: Red
- Seats in the United States Senate: 0 / 2
- Seats in the United States House of Representatives: 0 / 3
- Seats in the New Mexico Senate: 15 / 42
- Seats in the New Mexico House of Representatives: 25 / 70

Election symbol

Website
- newmexico.gop

The Republican Party of New Mexico is the affiliate of the United States Republican Party in New Mexico. It is headquartered in Albuquerque and led by chairperson Amy Barela, vice chair Hessel Yntema, and secretary Kathleen Apodaca. It currently has weak electoral power in the state, holding no statewide or federally elected offices, and having minorities in both houses of the New Mexico legislature.

It is the primary opposition to the Democratic Party of New Mexico. The party has provided 12 of the 31 governors of New Mexico, including three since the 1990s (Susana Martinez, Gary Johnson, and Garrey Carruthers). Other key Republican figures in New Mexico's history include Lew Wallace, José Francisco Chaves, Miguel Antonio Otero, Elfego Baca, Octaviano Ambrosio Larrazolo, and Edwin L. Mechem.

== History ==
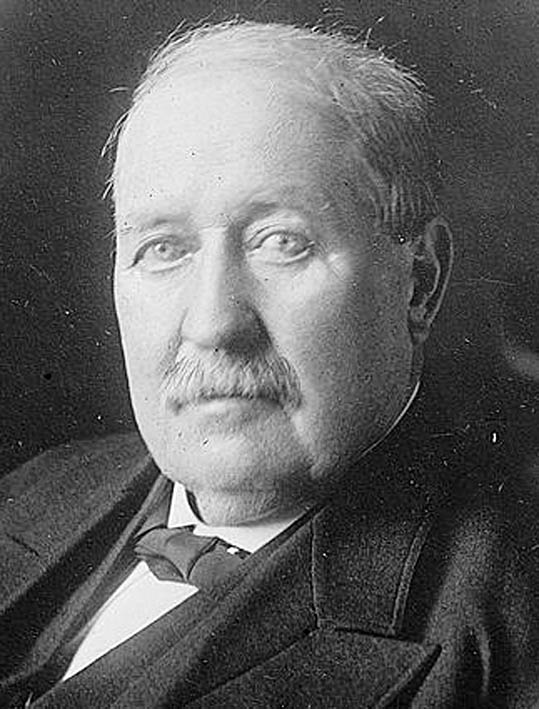
Thomas B. Catron

Like most other state Republican parties, the Republican Party of New Mexico was founded during the American Civil War Era in the recently acquired New Mexico Territory. The State of New Mexico was created in 1912. One of the founding fathers of the Republican Party of New Mexico was Thomas B. Catron. At the time of New Mexico's admission to the Union, Catron owned a significant majority of land in the state. Due to that wealth, Catron was influential in shaping the party. Catron served as U.S. Senator from New Mexico from 1912 to 1917.

Former Republican Governor of New Mexico, Gary Johnson, ran for the party's nomination for president in the 2012 Republican presidential primary. He was governor of New Mexico from 1995 to 2003. However, poll numbers showed Johnson well behind the other Republican candidates and he was only included in two debates with his opponents. This was partly the reason he switched to the Libertarian Party and continued his presidential run for that party's nomination. He won the nomination by a landslide and went on to win third place in the 2012 presidential election behind 1st-place finisher incumbent Democratic President Barack Obama and 2nd-place finisher the (Republican) former Massachusetts Governor Mitt Romney. He won nearly 1% nationwide and slightly above 3% in New Mexico.

=== 2020 election ===
Once Joe Biden defeated Donald Trump in the 2020 presidential election, the New Mexico GOP attempted to reject or question the election results. Shortly after the election the New Mexico Republican Party began raising funds to help Trump and his campaign challenge the election results. In a November 19 statement, the state GOP claimed that voter fraud occurred in the state, alleging that there was "manipulation of Dominion Voting Systems machines, illegal absentee ballots, ballots submitted with no applications and illegal actions against GOP poll challengers."

On December 14, 2020, the same day that New Mexico electors cast their electoral college votes, the Trump campaign filed a lawsuit in federal court against New Mexico Secretary of State, Maggie Toulouse Oliver, the electors of New Mexico and the State Canvassing Board. In a news release, the state GOP questioned the validity of the presidential election results and said it was working with the Trump campaign.

The New Mexico GOP supported a meeting of unofficial pro-Trump Republican electors that gathered at the state capitol on 14 December. Also in December 2020, the New Mexico GOP issued a statement supporting the Texas vs. Pennsylvania lawsuit seeking to reject certification of President-elect Biden's victory in four states, citing false claims of fraud.

In early January 2021, Rep. Cathrynn Brown proposed legislation to decertify Biden's victory in New Mexico by removing the state's five electoral votes he won, citing baseless claims of election fraud in New Mexico and in other states. The New Mexico GOP expressed support for the legislation. On January 7, 2021, New Mexico GOP chair Steve Pearce drew criticism when he claimed that alleged irregularities in the election "tarnished" democracy, soon after Biden's electoral victory was certified by Congress.

=== Headquarters fire ===
The party headquarters was damaged by fire in late March 2025, and as of March, the fire is being investigated as an act of arson.

== Pre-primary convention ==
Every two years, prior to the primary election, the party holds a pre-primary convention. This is where statewide candidates push to receive delegate support before the primary election. If a candidate receives at least 20% of the delegates vote, they are automatically placed on the primary election ballot. However, if a candidate does not receive at least 20% of the delegation vote, they can still get on the ballot by obtaining at least 1,500 signatures of Republicans who had voted in the most recent election within 10 days of the convention.

== Current elected officials ==
The party controls none of the state's seven statewide offices, holds a minority in the New Mexico Senate, and a minority in the New Mexico House of Representatives. Republicans hold none of the state's three U.S. House seats or two U.S. Senate seats.

=== Members of Congress ===
==== U.S. Senate ====
- None

Both of New Mexico's U.S. Senate seats have been held by Democrats since 2009. Pete Domenici was the last Republican to represent New Mexico in the U.S. Senate. First elected in 1972, Domenici opted to retire instead of seeking a seventh term. Congressman Steve Pearce ran as the Republican nominee in the 2008 election and was subsequently defeated by Democratic challenger Tom Udall.

==== U.S. House of Representatives ====
- None

All of New Mexico's three congressional districts have been held by Democrats since 2023. The last Republican to represent New Mexico in the U.S. House is Yvette Herrell, who served from 2021 to 2023.

=== Statewide offices ===
- None

No Republican has held a statewide elected office in New Mexico since 2019. New Mexico has not elected any GOP candidates to statewide office since 2014, when Susana Martinez was re-elected as governor on a joint ticket with Lieutenant Governor John Sanchez. In 2018, term limits prevented Martinez from seeking re-election to a third term. Congressman Steve Pearce ran as the Republican nominee in the 2018 election for Governor and was subsequently defeated by Democratic challenger Michelle Lujan Grisham.

== List of past chairs ==
- John Dendahl (1994 – 2003)
- Ramsey Gorham (2003 – 2004)
- Allen Weh (2004 – 2009)
- Harvey Yates (2009 – 2010)
- Monty Newman (2010 – 2012)
- John Billingsley (2012 – 2014)
- Debbie Maestas (2015 – 2016)
- Ryan Cangiolosi (2016 – 2018)
- Steve Pearce (2018 – 2024)
- Amy Barela (2024 - present)

== Election results ==
=== Presidential ===
New Mexico Republican Party presidential election results
Election	Presidential ticket	Votes	Vote %	Electoral votes	State result	National result
1912	William Howard Taft/Nicholas M. Butler	17,733	35.91%	0 / 3	Lost	Lost
1916	Charles E. Hughes/Charles W. Fairbanks	31,152	46.64%	0 / 3	Lost	Lost
1920	Warren G. Harding/Calvin Coolidge	57,634	54.68%	3 / 3	Won	Won
1924	Calvin Coolidge/Charles G. Dawes	54,745	48.52%	3 / 3	Won	Won
1928	Herbert Hoover/Charles Curtis	69,645	59.01%	3 / 3	Won	Won
1932	Herbert Hoover/Charles Curtis	54,217	35.76%	0 / 3	Lost	Lost
1936	Alf Landon/Frank Knox	61,727	36.50%	0 / 3	Lost	Lost
1940	Wendell Willkie/Charles L. McNary	79,315	43.28%	0 / 3	Lost	Lost
1944	Thomas E. Dewey/John W. Bricker	70,688	46.44%	0 / 4	Lost	Lost
1948	Thomas E. Dewey/Earl Warren	80,303	42.93%	0 / 4	Lost	Lost
1952	Dwight D. Eisenhower/Richard Nixon	132,170	55.39%	4 / 4	Won	Won
1956	Dwight D. Eisenhower/Richard Nixon	146,788	57.81%	4 / 4	Won	Won
1960	Richard Nixon/Henry Cabot Lodge Jr.	153,733	49.41%	0 / 4	Lost	Lost
1964	Barry Goldwater/William E. Miller	131,838	40.24%	0 / 4	Lost	Lost
1968	Richard Nixon/Spiro Agnew	169,692	51.85%	4 / 4	Won	Won
1972	Richard Nixon/Spiro Agnew	235,606	61.05%	4 / 4	Won	Won
1976	Gerald Ford/Bob Dole	211,419	50.75%	4 / 4	Won	Lost
1980	Ronald Reagan/George H. W. Bush	250,779	54.97%	4 / 4	Won	Won
1984	Ronald Reagan/George H. W. Bush	307,101	59.70%	5 / 5	Won	Won
1988	George H. W. Bush/Dan Quayle	270,341	51.86%	5 / 5	Won	Won
1992	George H. W. Bush/Dan Quayle	212,824	37.34%	0 / 5	Lost	Lost
1996	Bob Dole/Jack Kemp	232,751	41.86%	0 / 5	Lost	Lost
2000	George W. Bush/Dick Cheney	286,417	47.85%	0 / 5	Lost	Won
2004	George W. Bush/Dick Cheney	376,930	49.84%	5 / 5	Won	Won
2008	John McCain/Sarah Palin	346,832	41.78%	0 / 5	Lost	Lost
2012	Mitt Romney/Paul Ryan	335,788	42.84%	0 / 5	Lost	Lost
2016	Donald Trump/Mike Pence	319,667	40.04%	0 / 5	Lost	Won
2020	Donald Trump/Mike Pence	401,894	43.50%	0 / 5	Lost	Lost
2024	Donald Trump/JD Vance	423,391	45.85%	0 / 5	Lost	Won

=== Gubernatorial ===
New Mexico Republican Party gubernatorial election results
Election	Gubernatorial candidate/ticket	Votes	Vote %	Result
1911	Holm O. Bursum	28,019	46.05%	Lost ✗
1916	Holm O. Bursum	31,552	47.41%	Lost ✗
1918	Octaviano Ambrosio Larrazolo	23,752	50.50%	Won ✓
1920	Merritt C. Mechem	54,426	51.26%	Won ✓
1922	Charles Lee Hill	49,363	44.66%	Lost ✗
1924	Manuel B. Otero	55,984	48.64%	Lost ✗
1926	Richard C. Dillon	56,294	51.60%	Won ✓
1928	Richard C. Dillon	65,967	55.61%	Won ✓
1930	Clarence M. Botts	55,026	46.60%	Lost ✗
1932	Richard C. Dillon	67,406	44.19%	Lost ✗
1934	Jaffa Miller	71,899	47,60%	Lost ✗
1936	Jaffa Miller	72,539	42.75%	Lost ✗
1938	Albert K. Mitchell	75,017	47.59%	Lost ✗
1940	Mauricio F. Miera	82,306	44.41%	Lost ✗
1942	Joseph F. Tondre	49,380	45.45%	Lost ✗
1944	Carroll G. Gunderson	71,113	48.19%	Lost ✗
1946	Edward L. Safford	62,875	47.30%	Lost ✗
1948	Manuel Lujan Sr.	86,023	45.28%	Lost ✗
1950	Edwin L. Mechem	96,846	53.74%	Won ✓
1952	Edwin L. Mechem	129,116	53.77%	Won ✓
1954	Alvin Stockton	83,373	42.99%	Lost ✗
1956	Edwin L. Mechem	131,488	52.23%	Won ✓
1958	Edwin L. Mechem	101,567	49.53%	Lost ✗
1960	Edwin L. Mechem	153,765	50.33%	Won ✓
1962	Edwin L. Mechem	116,174	47.01%	Lost ✗
1964	Merle H. Tucker	126,540	39.79%	Lost ✗
1966	David Cargo	134,625	51.73%	Won ✓
1968	David Cargo	160,140	50.21%	Won ✓
1970	Pete Domenici	134,640	46.37%	Lost ✗
1974	Joe Skeen	160,430	48.80%	Lost ✗
1978	Joe Skeen	170,848	49.44%	Lost ✗
1982	John B. Irick	191,626	47.03%	Lost ✗
1986	Garrey Carruthers	209,455	53.05%	Won ✓
1990	Frank Bond/Mary L. Thompson	185,692	45.16%	Lost ✗
1994	Gary Johnson/Walter Bradley	232,945	49.81%	Won ✓
1998	Gary Johnson/Walter Bradley	271,948	54.53%	Won ✓
2002	John Sanchez/Rod Adair	189,074	39.05%	Lost ✗
2006	John Dendahl/Sue Wilson Beffort	174,364	31.18%	Lost ✗
2010	Susana Martinez/John Sanchez	321,219	53.29%	Won ✓
2014	Susana Martinez/John Sanchez	293,443	57.22%	Won ✓
2018	Steve Pearce/Michelle Garcia Holmes	298,091	42.80%	Lost ✗
2022	Mark Ronchetti/Ant Thornton	324,701	45.59%	Lost ✗
2026	Gregg Hull/David Gallegos	308,315	42.8%	Lost ✗
