= Baca family of New Mexico =

American family

Baca
- Country: United States
- Current region: New Mexico
- Earlier spellings: variant of Vaca
- Origin: Santa Fe de Nuevo México, New Spain
- Founded: circa 1600
- Founder: Capitán Cristóbal Baca and Ana Ortiz
- Traditions: Hispanos of New Mexico

The progenitors of the Baca family of New Mexico were Cristóbal Baca (Vaca) and his wife Ana Ortiz. Cristóbal was a military captain from Mexico City, who arrived in 1600 with his family to help reinforce the Spanish colonial Santa Fe de Nuevo Mexico province in the Viceroyalty of New Spain. At the time, they had three grown daughters and a small son. The Bacas had another son while living in Nuevo México.

== Family history ==
Cristóbal, the son of Juan de Vaca, was born in colonial Mexico City around 1567. His wife, also from that city, was the daughter of Francisco Pacheco. Their children born in Mexico City were Juana de Zamora, Isabel de Bohórquez, María de Villanueva, and Antonio Baca. Of the daughters, Juana married Simón Pérez de Bustillo, Isabel was the wife of Pedro Durán y Chaves, and María married Simón de Abendaño.

Antonio Baca was born circa 1600. He was married to Yumar Pérez de Bustillo, who was born circa 1591. They had three daughters: Gertudris, who married Antonio Jorge; Ana, who married Francisco López de Aragón, and Antonia, who was the wife of Antonio de Albizu. Apparently, Antonio had no sons to carry on the Baca name. Antonio was executed on 21 July 1643 for treason against the colonial government.

Alonzo Baca, born in Nuevo México, was the youngest sibling. Although he took part in the same conspiracy that resulted in his brother Antonio's death, Alonzo survived the affair. He may have had at least one son, another Cristóbal Baca. The Baca surname may have continued through Alonzo's progeny, including the second Cristóbal Baca.

The Pueblo Revolt occurred in 1680. Subsequently, many Spanish families fled Nuevo México as refugees. When the Spaniards reconquered the territory in 1693, a Manuel Baca and his family were among those who returned to Santa Fe. Manuel was born around 1653 and was the son of the second Cristóbal Baca. Manuel apparently had at least eight children with his wife María de Salazar. After arriving in New Mexico, they soon began living on land in Bernalillo previously owned by Manuel's father.

== Cabeza de Baca family ==
The Cabeza de Baca family is an offshoot of the Baca family. The progenitor of this family is Luis María Cabeza de Baca. He was born as Luis Maria Baca on 26 October 1754, the oldest son of Juan Antonio Baca and Maria Romero. He had over 20 children by three different wives. The Cabeza de Baca family members are often known by the abbreviated surnames of either C. de Baca or de Baca.

== Possible origin of the surname ==
The surname "Baca" is often assumed to be a variation of the name "Cabeza de Vaca", which means "head of a cow" in Spanish. The two possible origins of this name are:

- A Spanish shepherd, Martin Alhaja, was given the name by the Castilian King Alfonso VIII. In 1212, Alhaja placed a cow skull on the road that led over a pass in the mountains. Using this shepherds' path to infiltrate soldiers behind the Moorish position led to the victory of the Spanish king over the Moors at the Battle of Las Navas de Tolosa in Andalusia. He was awarded a coat-of-arms that included cattle skulls in its design.
- A Spanish knight named Fernan Ruiz distinguished himself in a victory over the Moors at Córdoba in 1235. For his services, the king added Cabeza de Vaca to Ruiz's name. This name was taken from the area where the knight was born. Research into Alvar Nuñez Cabeza de Vaca's genealogy indicates that a number of his ancestors and other relatives had the name Fernan Ruiz.

== Genealogical misconceptions ==
=== Ortiz/Pacheco line ===
Some researchers have discovered an erroneous link between Crístobal Baca's wife Ana Ortíz and Christopher Columbus, among others. As noted previously, Ana Ortíz was the daughter of one Francisco Pacheco. At least three separate articles published in genealogical journals have identified this man as Francisco Pacheco de Cordóva. Not only have researchers found that Pacheco de Córdova had an impressive lineage, but also did his wife Juana de la Cueva y Toledo Colón.

Ana Ortíz has also been shown to be related to famed explorer Francisco Vásquez de Coronado and Francisco Enriques, the Duke of Alburquerque. The problem with this finding is that Francisco Pacheco de Córdova, and presumably his wife, would have been too young to be the parents of Ana Ortíz. Pacheco was born in 1573, while Ana Ortíz's daughter Isabel de Bohórquez was born circa 1586. Thus, Pacheco would have been only 13 years older than the woman who would supposedly have been his granddaughter.

=== Alvar Nuñez Cabeza de Vaca ===
One assumption is that famed Spanish explorer Alvar Nuñez Cabeza de Vaca was an ancestor of Juan de Vaca, and consequently, Cristóbal Baca. In 1988, Dr. Eric Beerman reviewed the research that had been done on Cabeza de Vaca, and did not discover any information that this explorer had any direct descendants, but he did not completely rule out that possibility. Another researcher, George C' de Baca, did extensive research, but was unable to find a connection between the New Mexico Baca family and the Cabeza de Vaca family in Spain. The Baca surname is still generally assumed to have originated from this noble family.

== Notable family members ==
- Edward D. Baca, first Hispanic head of the National Guard Bureau, Lieutenant General U.S. Army (ret.)
- Elfego Baca, frontier personality
- Ezequiel Cabeza de Baca, second governor of New Mexico
- Fabiola Cabeza de Baca Gilbert, writer and educator
- Jimmy Santiago Baca, poet
- Jim Baca, former Albuquerque, New Mexico, mayor
- Joe Baca, U.S. Representative from California - born in Belen, New Mexico
- Joe Baca Jr., California politician and former Rialto city council member
- José A. Baca, lieutenant governor of New Mexico
- Judy Baca, contemporary artist
- Polly Baca-Barragan, first Mexican-American to serve in the Colorado Legislature
- Luis CdeBaca, diplomat

== Places named after the Baca family ==
- Baca County, Colorado
- Baca Grant No. 1, now Valles Caldera in New Mexico
- Baca Grant No. 2, now part of Bell Ranch in New Mexico
- Luis Maria Baca Grant No. 4 in Colorado
- Baca National Wildlife Refuge in Colorado
- De Baca County, New Mexico
- Trinidad, Colorado - named after Trinidad Baca
- Vacaville, California

== Other locations of interest ==
- Valles Caldera
