= George Curry (politician) =

American politician (1861–1947)

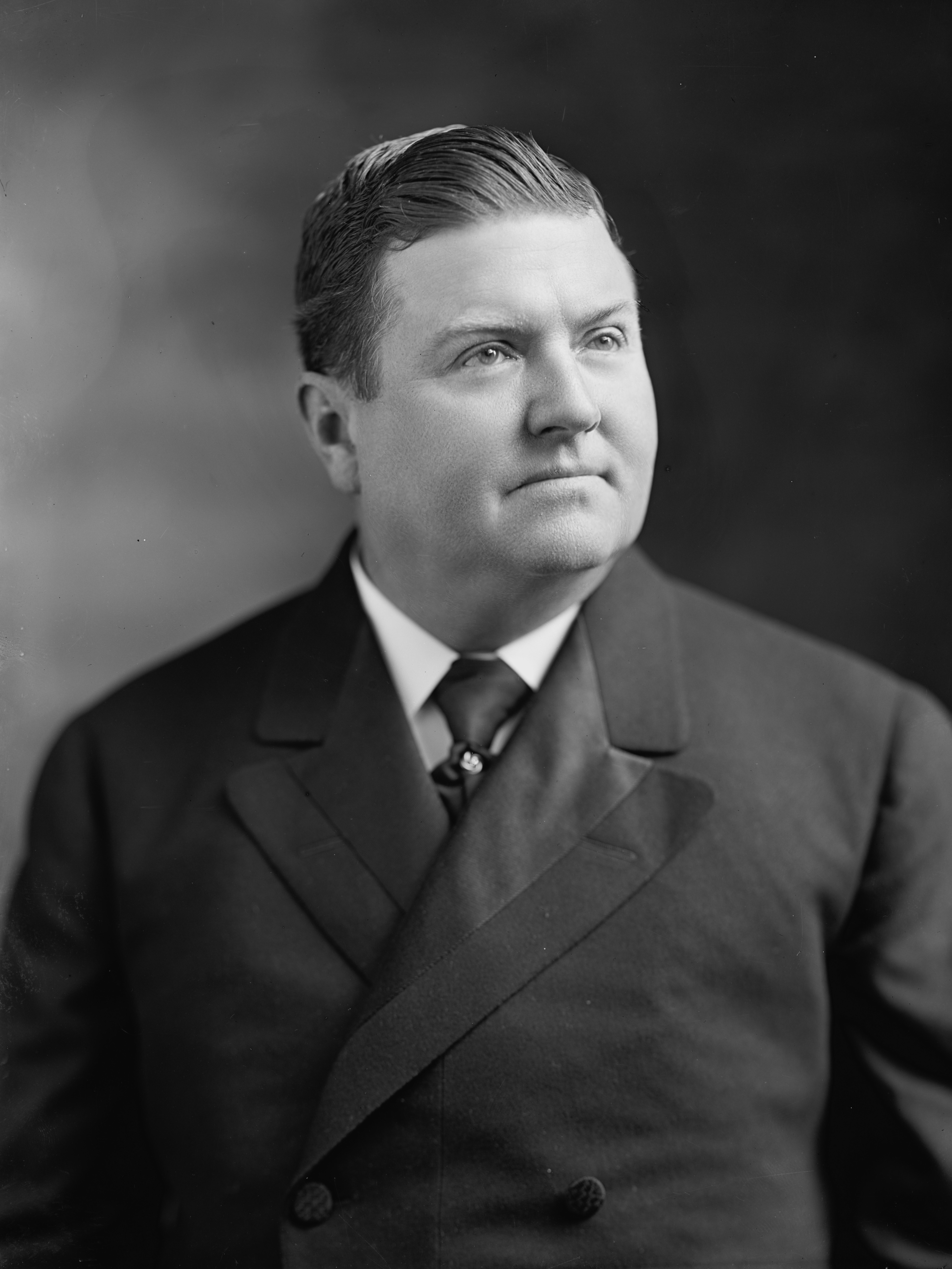

Member of the U.S. House of Representatives from New Mexico's at-large district
- In office January 8, 1912 – March 3, 1913
- Preceded by: 2nd seat established
- Succeeded by: 2nd seat abolished

17th Governor of New Mexico Territory
- In office April 20, 1907 – March 1, 1910
- Appointed by: Theodore Roosevelt
- Preceded by: Herbert James Hagerman
- Succeeded by: William J. Mills

Governor of Samar
- In office 1905–1907
- Preceded by: Segundo Singzon
- Succeeded by: Maximo Cinco

Governor of Isabela
- In office 1903–1905
- Preceded by: Francisco Dichoso
- Succeeded by: Blas Villamor

Governor of Ambos Camarines
- In office 1901
- Preceded by: Modern position created, last held by a Spanish Governor
- Succeeded by: James Ross

Personal details
- Born: George Alexander Curry; April 3, 1861 West Feliciana Parish, Louisiana, C.S.
- Died: November 27, 1947 (aged 86) Albuquerque, New Mexico, U.S.
- Party: Republican
- Occupation: politician

George Alexander Curry (April 3, 1861 – November 27, 1947) was a U.S. military officer and politician. He was the 17th governor of New Mexico Territory from 1907 to 1910, and once it became a state he represented it in the 62nd United States Congress. Curry County, New Mexico, is named in his honor.

== Early life ==
He was born in Bayou Sara, West Feliciana Parish, Louisiana, on April 3, 1861, to George Alexander and Clara Madden Curry. He was the eldest of four sons. Curry's mother was a graduate of Dublin University and his father was a mechanic who managed Greenwood Plantation. His father served as a captain in the Confederate Army and after the Civil War purchased Sevastopol Plantation. Curry's father was a parish leader of the local Ku Klux Klan, and in 1870 he was ambushed and killed. Three years later Curry's mother moved the family to Dodge City, Kansas, where Curry got his first job at age 12 working as a messenger boy for a mercantile company. Following his mother's death in 1879, Curry moved to Lincoln County, New Mexico, where he worked on a cattle ranch until 1881. Over the next few years Curry held several jobs managing stores and hotels. He acted as post trader at Fort Stanton, and engaged in the mercantile and stock business until 1886.

== Career ==
Curry began his political career at age 23 when he became a member of Colfax County's delegation at the Democratic Territorial Convention in Albuquerque. He was deputy treasurer of Lincoln County, New Mexico, in 1886 and 1887, elected county clerk in 1888, county assessor in 1890, and sheriff in 1892. He served as a member of the Territorial senate in 1894 and 1896, serving as president in his final year in the body.

In a range war that became known as the Colfax County War, Curry served as an activist and a principal leader of settlers in dispute with the Maxwell Land Grant Company. He was present when a large gun battle erupted between the two parties at the Colfax County Courthouse. The event led to the deaths of Curry's brother, John Curry, and one of his associates. Afterwards, Curry pleaded guilty to unlawfully carrying firearms and was fined five dollars. During the Spanish–American War he served in Theodore Roosevelt's Rough Riders. He did not see action in Cuba, but did participate in the fighting in the Philippines.

After returning from the war, he became sheriff of Otero County, New Mexico in 1899. He then resigned to join the Eleventh Volunteer Cavalry where he served from December 16, 1899 to March 20, 1901 in the Philippines. Following the organization of provincial governments there, he was appointed as the inaugural governor of Ambos Camarines in 1901, the chief of police of Manila for the remainder of 1901, the governor of Isabela from 1903 to 1905, and the governor of Samar from 1905 to 1907. He served as the 18th Governor of New Mexico Territory from 1907 to 1910, and upon the admission of New Mexico as a State into the Union was elected as a Republican to the Sixty-second Congress and served from January 8, 1912, to March 3, 1913.

Curry declined to be a candidate for renomination in 1912. He then engaged in the hotel business in Socorro, New Mexico, was private secretary to US Senator Holm O. Bursum in 1921 and 1922, and was a member of the International Boundary Commission from 1922 to 1927. In April 1932, he was falsely reported to have died in Hillsboro; Curry's son Clifford unsuccessfully sued the Albuquerque Journal for causing a heart attack upon reading the story in the newspaper. After retiring, Curry moved to a ranch near Cutter, and served as State Historian from 1945 until his death in Albuquerque on November 27, 1947, with interment in the Santa Fe National Cemetery. Curry County, New Mexico, was named in his honor.

== Magtaon Attack ==
On March 24, 1906, during the Pulahan Campaign as Governor of Samar, Curry negotiated with Cipriano "Teducduc" Amango and Isidro "Otoy" Pompac the Pulahan leaders of southeastern Samar. Assured that the Pulahan forces were falling from attrition, Curry negotiated to meet at a neutral small barrio not shown on most maps, Magtaon in Mapanas. For the negotiations the army garrison was replaced by a constabulary unit. Present for the negotiations were Curry, a constabulary honour guard and visitors. As the Pulahan began filing in they suddenly attacked, killing 22 constables, capturing several rifles and fleeing into the jungle. Curry barely escaped and in retaliation ordered

"in your operations outside the towns and barrios you may kill anyone you have reason to [believe] a pulahan'; those who were members of the 'Magtaon band' were to be 'exterminated'"

== Gallery ==
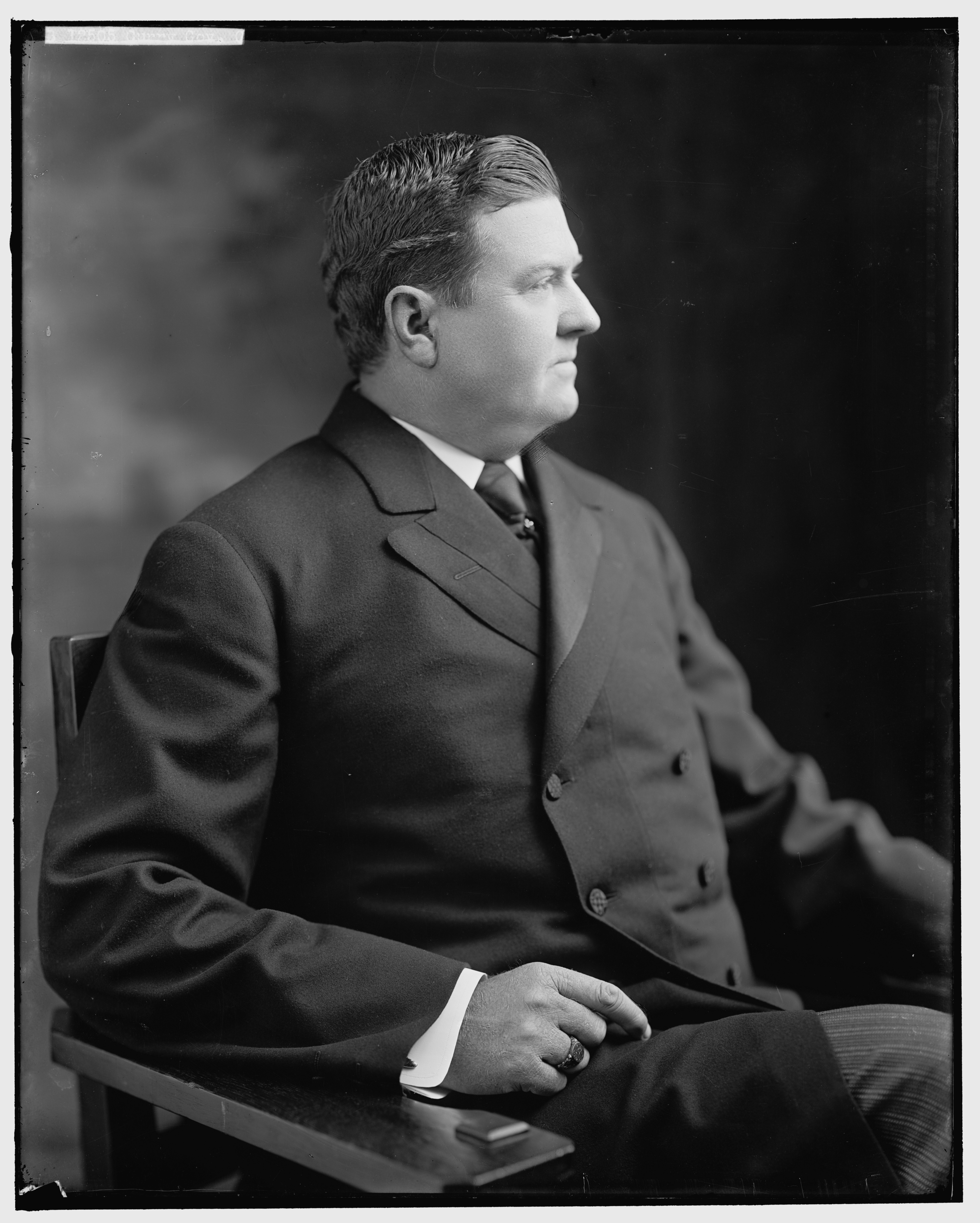
Side profile

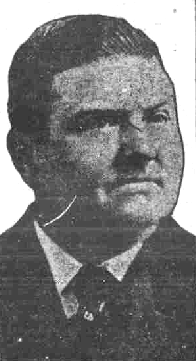
1913 Newspaper Clipping

Political offices
New office	Governor of Ambos Camarines; 1901	Succeeded by James Ross
Preceded by Francisco Dichoso	Governor of Isabela; 1903–1905	Succeeded by Blas Villamor
Preceded by Segundo Singzon	Governor of Samar; 1905–1907	Succeeded by Maximo Cinco
Preceded by Herbert James Hagerman	Governor of New Mexico Territory; 1907–1910	Succeeded by William J. Mills
U.S. House of Representatives
New seat	Representative from New Mexico; 1912–1913	2nd seat eliminated
