= 1916 New Mexico gubernatorial election =

- November 7, 1916
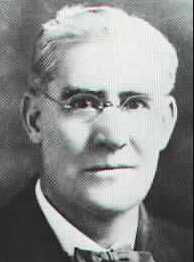

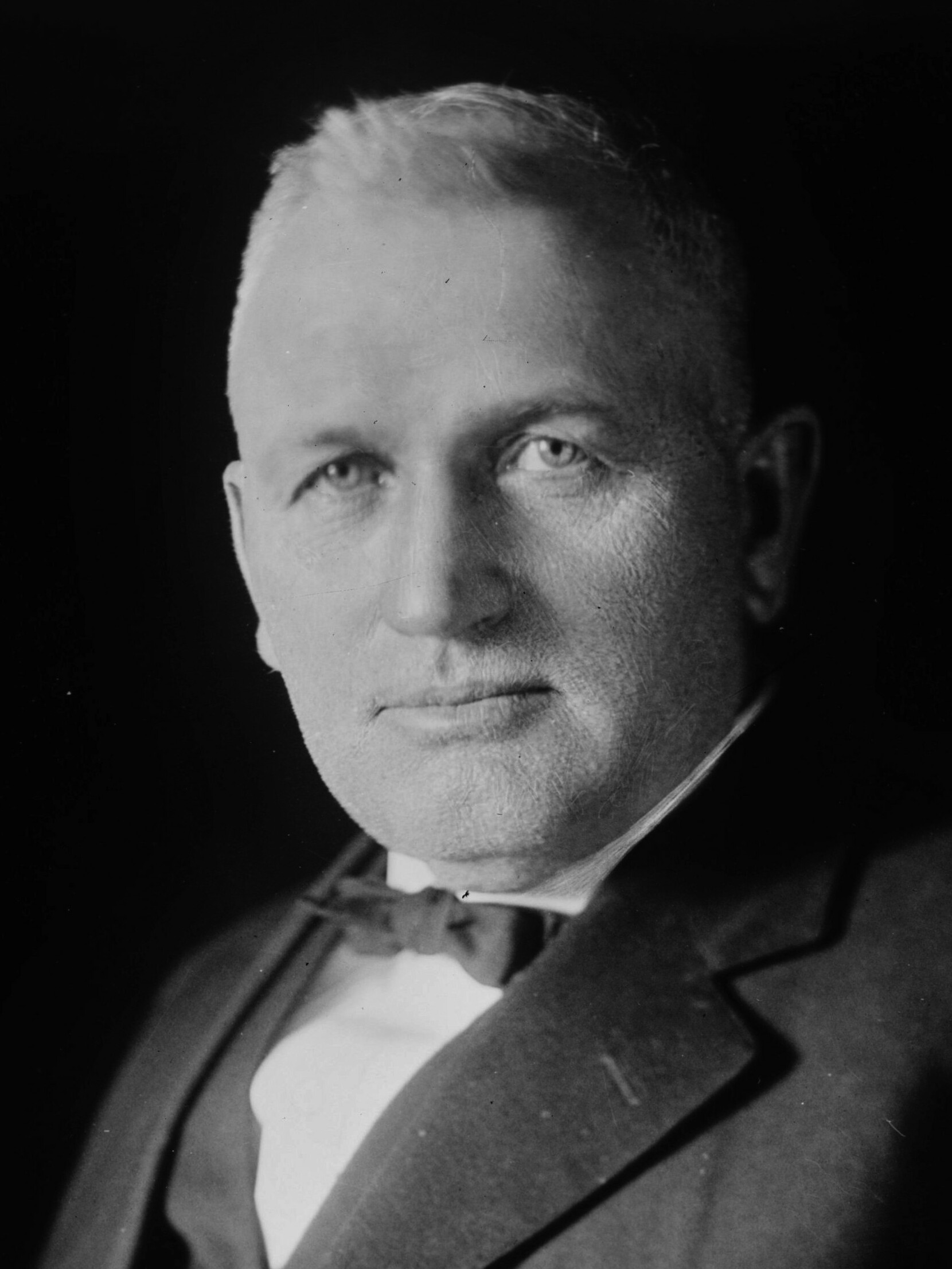
Nominee	Ezequiel Cabeza De Baca	Holm O. Bursum
Party	Democratic	Republican
Popular vote	32,875	31,552
Percentage	49.40%	47.41%
- County results De Baca: 40–50% 50–60% 60–70% 70–80% Bursum: 50–60% 60–70% 80–90%
Governor before election
William C. McDonald
Democratic
Elected Governor
Ezequiel Cabeza De Baca
Democratic

The 1916 New Mexico gubernatorial election was held on November 7, 1916.

Incumbent Democratic Governor William C. McDonald did not run for re-election but ran instead for Lieutenant Governor.

Democratic nominee Ezequiel Cabeza De Baca defeated Republican nominee Holm O. Bursum.

== General election ==
=== Candidates ===
- Ezequiel Cabeza De Baca, Democratic, incumbent Lieutenant Governor
- Holm O. Bursum, Republican, Republican candidate for Governor in 1911
- N. A. Wells, Socialist

=== Results ===
1916 New Mexico gubernatorial election (Note: Some sources give the result as De Baca 32,732, Bursum 31,524, Wells 2,117. These figures exclude the "absent railroad vote".)
Party	Candidate	Votes	%	±%
Democratic	Ezequiel Cabeza De Baca	32,875	49.40%	−1.61%
Republican	Holm O. Bursum	31,552	47.41%	+1.36%
Socialist	N. A. Wells	2,124	3.19%	+0.25%
Majority		1,323	1.99%	
Total votes		66,551	100.00%	
Democratic hold		Swing	-2.97%	

=== Results by county ===
County	Ezequiel Cabeza De Baca Democratic		Holm O. Bursum Republican		N. A. Wells Socialist		Margin		Total votes cast
County	#	%	#	%	#	%	#	%	Total votes cast
Bernalillo	2,357	45.47%	2,739	52.84%	88	1.70%	-382	-7.37%	5,184
Chaves	2,124	64.36%	953	28.88%	223	6.76%	1,171	35.48%	3,300
Colfax	1,996	51.67%	1,819	47.09%	48	1.24%	177	4.58%	3,863
Curry	1,039	55.44%	494	26.36%	341	18.20%	545	29.08%	1,874
Doña Ana	1,147	42.48%	1,533	56.78%	20	0.74%	-386	-14.30%	2,700
Eddy	1,386	72.04%	435	22.61%	103	5.35%	951	49.43%	1,924
Grant	1,978	46.55%	2,163	50.91%	108	2.54%	-185	-4.35%	4,249
Guadalupe	1,206	53.34%	1,023	45.25%	32	1.42%	183	8.09%	2,261
Lincoln	721	40.35%	1,021	57.13%	45	2.52%	-300	-16.79%	1,787
Luna	756	60.00%	459	36.43%	45	3.57%	297	23.57%	1,260
McKinley	563	45.55%	670	54.21%	3	0.24%	-107	-8.66%	1,236
Mora	1,610	52.10%	1,463	47.35%	17	0.55%	147	4.76%	3,090
Otero	765	50.50%	618	40.79%	132	8.71%	147	9.70%	1,515
Quay	1,433	59.51%	728	30.23%	247	10.26%	705	29.28%	2,408
Rio Arriba	1,522	43.67%	1,962	56.30%	1	0.03%	-440	-12.63%	3,485
Roosevelt	1,081	74.14%	232	15.91%	145	9.95%	849	58.23%	1,458
San Juan	566	53.75%	439	41.69%	48	4.56%	127	12.06%	1,053
San Miguel	2,544	49.01%	2,615	50.38%	32	0.62%	-71	-1.37%	5,191
Sandoval	754	56.10%	590	43.90%	0	0.00%	164	12.20%	1,344
Santa Fe	1,492	45.85%	1,745	53.63%	17	0.52%	-253	-7.78%	3,254
Sierra	427	44.25%	515	53.37%	23	2.38%	-88	-9.12%	965
Socorro	1,322	37.30%	2,205	62.22%	17	0.48%	-883	-24.92%	3,544
Taos	1,107	48.92%	1,116	49.32%	40	1.77%	-9	-0.40%	2,263
Torrance	665	39.80%	937	56.07%	69	4.13%	-272	-16.28%	1,671
Union	1,896	51.08%	1,553	41.84%	263	7.09%	343	9.24%	3,712
Valencia	418	21.33%	1,525	77.81%	17	0.87%	-1,107	-56.48%	1,960
Total	32,875	49.40%	31,552	47.41%	2,124	3.19%	1,323	1.99%	66,551

==== Counties that flipped from Republican to Democratic ====
- Mora

==== Counties that flipped from Democratic to Republican ====
- Bernalillo
- Doña Ana
- Grant
- Lincoln
- Sierra
