= James Murray, Sr. =

American politician from New Mexico (1889-1946)

James Marshall Murray Sr.

11th Lieutenant Governor of New Mexico
- In office January 1, 1939 – January 1, 1941
- Governor: John E. Miles
- Preceded by: Hiram M. Dow
- Succeeded by: Ceferino Quintana

Personal details
- Born: April 9, 1889 St. Marys, Ohio, U.S.
- Died: January 16, 1946 (aged 56) Hobbs, New Mexico, U.S.
- Party: Democratic
- Children: 6

James Marshall Murray Sr. (April 9, 1889 – January 16, 1946) was an American entrepreneur and politician who served as the 11th lieutenant governor of New Mexico as a member of the Democratic party from January 1, 1939, to January 1, 1941.

== Early life ==
Murray was born in St. Marys, Ohio to Richard H. Murray (1849-1935) and Carrie A. Guyer (1855-1893) as the second youngest of five children. Murray went on to marry Cora Edna Hornaday (1889-1966) on August 23, 1910, in Tulsa, Oklahoma. He went on to have 7 children and moved to Hobbs, New Mexico in the 1930s. In 1933 he founded the Me-Tex Supply Company with his son James Jr. (1912-1991).

== Political career and death ==
Murray ran as a candidate for the 1938 New Mexico lieutenant gubernatorial election, and secured the Democratic nomination. He went on to defeat Republican nominee Joseph F. Tondre in the general election on November 8, 1938, with 86,884 votes (56.33%) against Tondre's 67,078 votes (43.49%). Murray was sworn in as the 11th lieutenant governor of New Mexico on January 1, 1939, serving under Governor John E. Miles. In July 1940, Murray was a delegate to Democratic National Convention from New Mexico in Chicago, Illinois. Murray's term as Lieutenant Governor ended on January 1, 1941.

Murray died on January 16, 1946, in Hobbs, New Mexico.

Political offices
Preceded by Hiram M. Dow	Lieutenant Governor of New Mexico; 1939-1941	Succeeded by Ceferino Quintana
