= Valle de Allende =

City in the Mexican state of Chihuahua

- Municipal seat
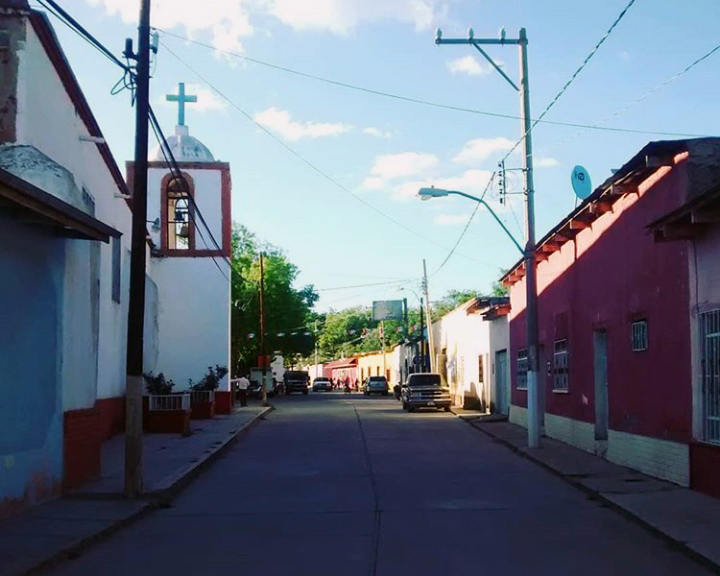
- Interactive map of Valle de Allende
- Location in Mexico Valle de Allende (Mexico)
- Coordinates: 26°56′23″N 105°23′43″W
- Country: Mexico
- State: Chihuahua
- Municipality: Allende

Area
  - Total: 10.26 ha (25.4 acres)
- Elevation: 1,590 m (5,220 ft)

Population (2010)
  - Total: 4,125
  - Density: 40,200/km^{2} (104,100/sq mi)
- Demonym(s): Vallero, vallera
- Time zone: UTC-6 (Central Time Zone)

Valle de Allende is the municipal seat and largest city of the municipality of Allende in the Mexican state of Chihuahua. Originally named Valle de San Bartolomé for Bartholomew the Apostle, it was founded in 1569 by Franciscan friars. The city is one of the oldest in Chihuahua.

The city received its current name in 1825 in honor of Ignacio Allende, a military leader during the Mexican War of Independence. It is part of the "El Camino Real de Tierra Adentro" (site 1351-059)

As of 2010, Valle de Allende had a population of 4,185.

Valle de Allende was the location of the fall, in 1969, of a scientifically important meteorite (known as Allende) that has become the most studied meteorite.

== Notable people ==
- Octaviano Ambrosio Larrazolo - Governor of New Mexico and later US Senator.
