= Bursum House =

- U.S. National Register of Historic Places
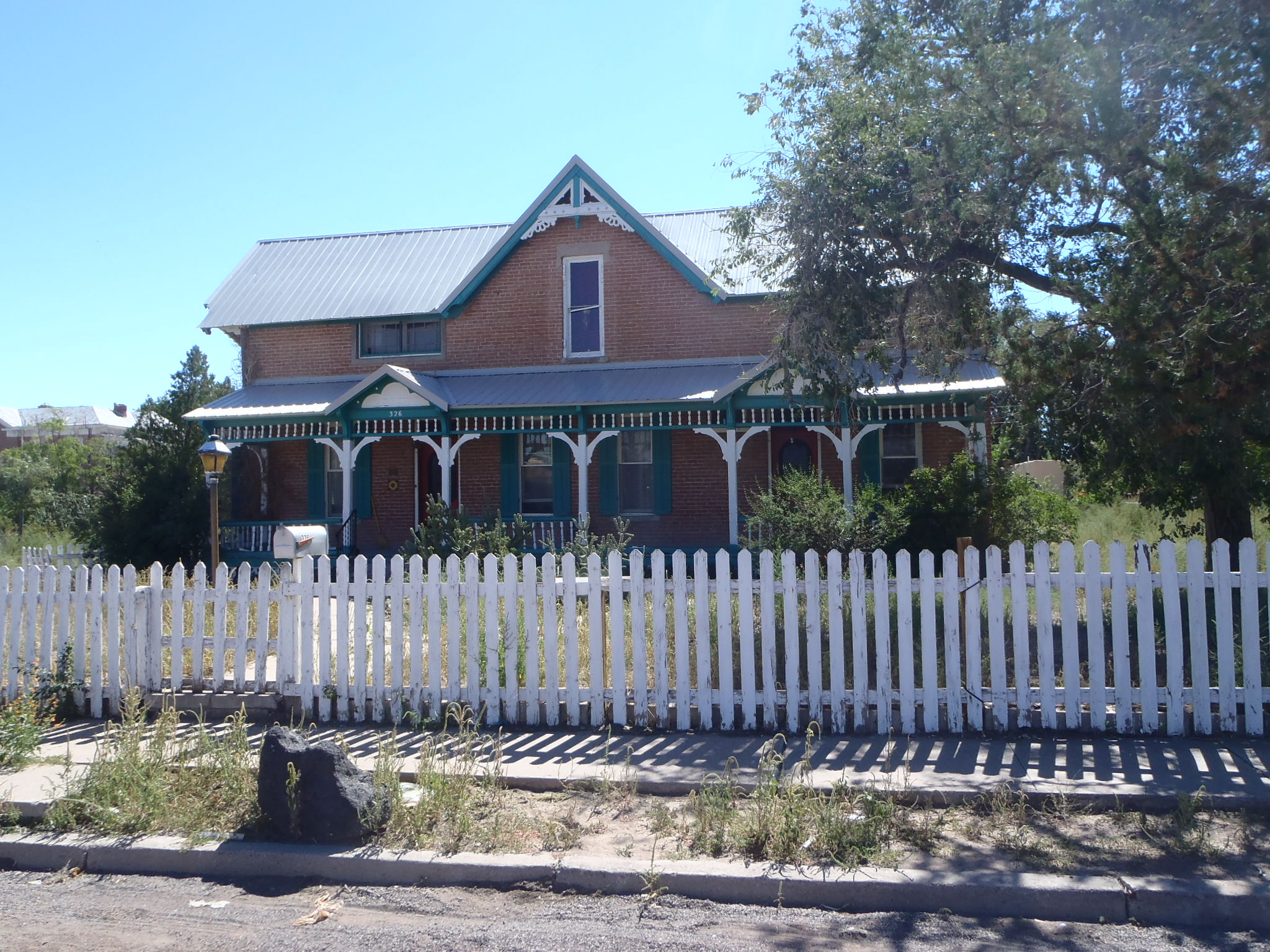

- Location within New Mexico
- Location: 326 Church St., Socorro, New Mexico
- Coordinates: 34°03′20″N 106°53′46″W
- Area: 0.3 acres (0.12 ha)
- Built: 1887
- Built by: Watson, William
- Architectural style: Stick/eastlake
- NRHP reference No.: 75001172
- Added to NRHP: June 18, 1975

The Bursum House, at 326 Church St. in Socorro, New Mexico, was built in 1887 by William Watson. It was listed on the National Register of Historic Places in 1975.

It is significant as one of few examples of the ornate Eastlake Style architecture, in fashion in San Francisco and elsewhere in the West, that was built in New Mexico. The house was made of brick while frame construction is most common with this style.

It was built for Candelario Garcia, a Socorro County, New Mexico politician and landowner, who served multiple terms in the Territorial legislature between 1855 and 1878.

It was later home of Holm O. Bursum (1867-1953), a politician involved in Utah's quest for statehood, the first Republican candidate for governor of the new state, and an appointed U.S. Senator.
