= 1921 United States Senate special election in New Mexico =

- September 20, 1921
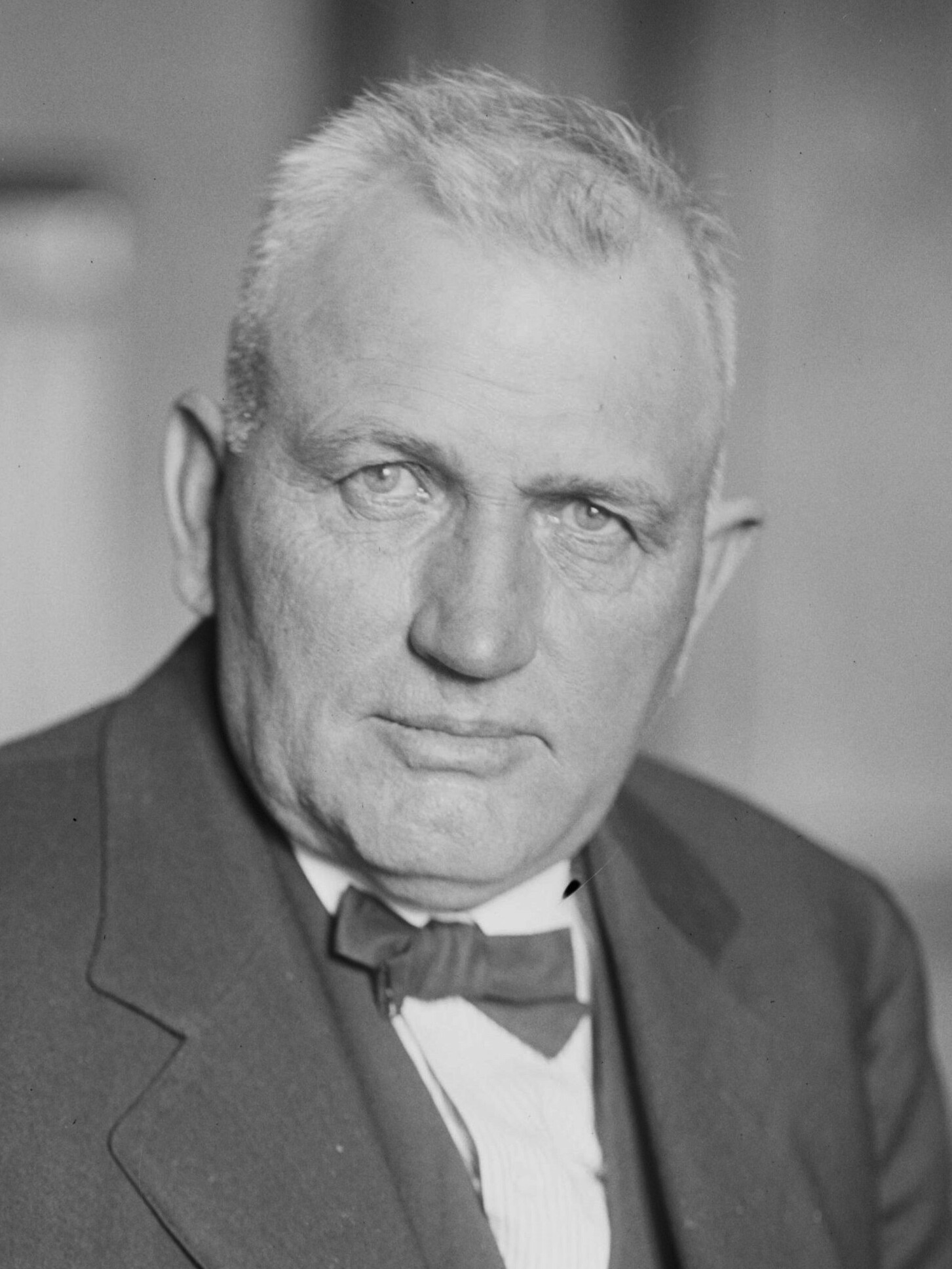

Nominee	Holm O. Bursum	Richard H. Hanna
Party	Republican	Democratic
Popular vote	36,868	31,353
Percentage	51.35%	43.67%
- County results Bursum: 40–50% 50–60% 60–70% 70–80% 80–90% Hanna: 50–60% 60–70% 70–80%
U.S. senator before election
Albert B. Fall
Republican
Elected U.S. Senator
Holm O. Bursum
Republican

There was a single special election in 1921 to the United States Senate. It was held in New Mexico for the Class 2 seat, previously held by Albert B. Fall, who resigned March 3, 1921 to become U.S. Secretary of the Interior. Holm O. Bursum was appointed March 11, 1921 to replace him until this special election. On September 20, 1921, he also won the election.

1921 United States Senate special election in New Mexico
Party	Candidate	Votes	%
Republican	Holm O. Bursum	36,868	51.35%
Democratic	Richard H. Hanna	31,353	43.67%
Independent	A. A. Sena	2,906	4.05%
Socialist	T. S. Smith	671	0.94%
Republican hold			

== See also ==
- 1921 United States Senate elections
