= William J. Mills =

American judge (1848–1915)

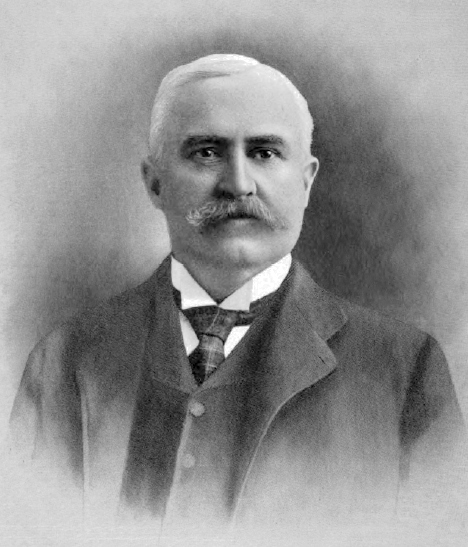

18th Governor of New Mexico Territory
- In office March 1, 1910 – January 15, 1912
- Nominated by: William H. Taft
- Preceded by: George Curry
- Succeeded by: William C. McDonald as state Governor

Chief Justice of the New Mexico Territorial Supreme Court
- In office January 31, 1898 – January 30, 1910
- Nominated by: William McKinley, Theodore Roosevelt
- Preceded by: Thomas W. Smith
- Succeeded by: William H. Pope

Personal details
- Born: January 11, 1849 Yazoo City, Mississippi, U.S.
- Died: December 24, 1915 (aged 66) Las Vegas, New Mexico, U.S.
- Party: Democratic/Republican
- Spouse: Alice Waddingham
- Relations: William Henry Law (stepfather)

William Joseph Mills (January 11, 1849 – December 24, 1915) was an American jurist who served three terms as the chief justice of the New Mexico Territorial Supreme Court and as the 18th and final governor of New Mexico Territory.

== Background ==
Mills was born in Yazoo City, Mississippi, on January 11, 1849, to William and Harriet (Beale) Mills. His father died when he was young and his mother relocated the family to Connecticut where she married William Henry Law. Mills was educated at the Norwich Free Academy. He worked briefly in New York City before enrolling at Yale University and graduating from the law school in 1877. Mills was admitted to the bar the same year he graduated and set up a private practice in New Haven, Connecticut.

Soon after graduation, Mills became active in politics and identified with the Democratic Party. He was elected to the Connecticut House of Representatives in 1878 and Connecticut Senate in 1881 and 1882. Mills wed Alice Waddingham of West Haven, Connecticut on January 14, 1885. The marriage produced three children: Wilson W., Alice L. and Madeline.

== New Mexico ==
Mills moved to New Mexico Territory, where his father-in-law, Wilson Waddingham, owned significant tracts of land, and established a legal practice in 1886. From August 1888 till April 1890 he was partnered with Thomas B. Catron, an influential member of the territory's Republican Party. Mills returned to New Haven in 1894.

President William McKinley nominated Mills to become chief justice of the New Mexico Territorial Supreme Court with the commissioning occurring on January 31, 1898. At the time of his nomination, Mills was a Gold Democrat but soon after switched his party affiliation and became a Republican. Upon completion of his first term, President Theodore Roosevelt twice reappointed the chief justice for additional terms.

=== Governorship ===
After Governor George Curry submitted his resignation, President William H. Taft nominated Mills to become Governor of New Mexico Territory. According to Curry, Taft found the chief justice's judicial background and conservative outlook attractive and viewed the nominee as a potential governor or U.S. senator if the territory should achieve statehood. Mills accepted the offer on November 24, 1909. The new governor was sworn in on March 1, 1910, as per the terms of his predecessor's resignation.

Upon taking office, Mills began lobbying efforts aimed at achieving statehood for New Mexico. With the signing of the enabling act on June 20, 1910, his activities switched to preparations for statehood. An election of representatives for a constitutional convention was called for September 6, with the convention to draw up a state constitution running from October 3 until November 21, 1910. The resulting document lacked many progressive reforms of the days, such as women's suffrage, and Mills was left to defend the document until it was approved by President Taft in August 1911.

Mills called for election of new state office holders in November 1911. New Mexico was admitted as a state on January 6, 1912, with Mills leaving office at noon on January 15, 1912, as William C. McDonald took the oath of office as the new state governor.

=== Later life ===
After leaving office, Mills made an unsuccessful run for a U.S. Senate seat in 1912. He died in East Las Vegas, New Mexico on December 24, 1915.

Political offices
| Preceded by George Curry | Governor of New Mexico Territory; 1910–1912 | Succeeded by William C. McDonald state Governor |
