= Allende Municipality, Chihuahua =

Municipality in the Mexican state of Chihuahua

Allende Municipality
- Municipality
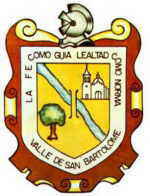
- Coat of arms

- Location of Allende in Chihuahua
- Coordinates: 26°56′N 105°24′W
- Country: Mexico
- State: Chihuahua
- Founded: 1826
- Named for: Ignacio Allende
- Seat: Valle de Allende
- Largest city: Valle de Allende

Government
  - Municipal president: Mauro Pablo Vázquez Ramírez (PRI)

Area
  - Total: 2,471.3 km^{2} (954.2 sq mi)

Population (2010)
  - Total: 8,409
- Time zone: UTC-6 (CST)

Allende Municipality (Spanish: Municipio de Allende) is one of 67 municipalities in the Mexican state of Chihuahua, located in the southeastern portion of the state. Valle de Allende is its municipal seat and largest city. Its main claim to fame is the 1969 fall of the Allende meteorite.

== Demographics ==
As of 2010, the municipality had a total population of 8,409, up from 8,263 as of 2005.

== Localities ==
The municipality had 146 localities, the largest of which (with 2010 populations in parentheses) were: Valle de Ignacio Allende (4,185), classified as urban, and Pueblito de Allende (1,381), classified as rural.

=== Towns and villages ===
Name	Population (2005)
Valle de Allende	3 976
Pueblito de Allende	1 460
Talamantes	496
Colonia Búfalo	307
Total Municipality	8,263

== Government ==
=== Municipal presidents ===
Term	Municipal president	Political party	Notes
1950–1953	Elio Aranda Caro	PRI	
1953–1956	Guillermo Máynez A.	PRI	
1956–1959	Jesús José Jiménez G.	PRI	
1959–1962	Humberto Máynez B.	PRI	
1962–1965	Raúl Jaramillo G.	PRI	
1965–1968	Bonifacio Ávalos R.	PRI	
1968–1971	Heriberto Soto Rojas	PRI	
1971–1974	Luis A. Ávalos R.	PRI	
1974–1977	Jesús Francisco Villanueva	PRI	
1977–1980	Jesús Armendáriz A.	PRI	
1980–1983	Dionisio Hernández R.	PRI	
1983–1986	Amador Pichardo	PRI	
1986–1989	J. Rosario Arroyo E.	PRI	
1989–1992	Antonio Peralta Salgado	PRI	
1992–1995	Silvia E. Villanueva R.	PRI	
1995–1998	Guillermo Muñoz M.	PRI	
1998–2001	Rosa Paula Mendoza V.	PRI	
2001–2004	Jesús Francisco Luján Vázquez	PRI	
2004–2007	José Luis Prieto Torres	PAN PRD Convergence	
2007–2010	Mauro Paulo Vázquez Ramírez	PRI Panal	
2010–2013	Jesús Horacio Soto Armendáriz	PRI PVEM; Panal	
2013–2016	Gilberto García Mendoza	PRI PVEM; Panal	
2016–2018	Ramón Eustacio Villegas Castro	PRI PVEM; Panal	
2018–26/04/2021	Blanca Jennyra Figueroa Chávez	PAN MC	She applied for temporary leave in order to seek reelection
27/04/2021–07/06/2021	Débora Armendáriz	PAN MC	Acting municipal president
08/06/2021–2021	Blanca Jennyra Figueroa Chávez	PAN MC	She was defeated in the elections of 06/06/2021 when seeking reelection. Resumed office to conclude her triennium
2021–2024	Jesús Horacio Soto Armendáriz	PRI	He was elected on 06/06/2021
2024–	Rafael Payán Morales	Morena	He was elected on 02/06/2024

== See also ==
- Municipal Government Web Site (Spanish)
