= Washington Ellsworth Lindsey =

3rd Governor of New Mexico

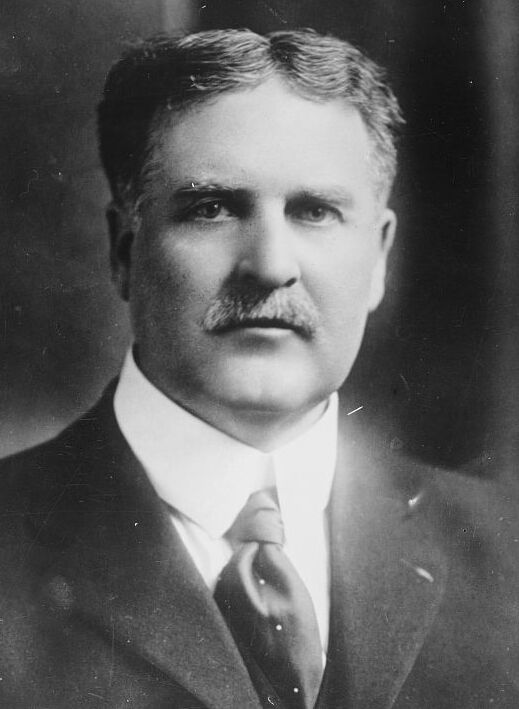

3rd Governor of New Mexico
- In office February 18, 1917 – January 1, 1919
- Lieutenant: Vacant
- Preceded by: Ezequiel Cabeza De Baca
- Succeeded by: Octaviano Ambrosio Larrazolo

2nd Lieutenant Governor of New Mexico
- In office January 1, 1917 – February 18, 1917
- Governor: Ezequiel Cabeza de Baca
- Preceded by: Ezequiel Cabeza de Baca
- Succeeded by: Benjamin F. Pankey

Personal details
- Born: December 20, 1862 Armstrongs Mills, Ohio, US
- Died: April 5, 1926 (aged 63) Portales, New Mexico, US
- Party: Republican
- Spouse(s): Deane C. Haughton and Miss Becker (married twice)
- Education: Scio College; University of Michigan
- Profession: Attorney

Washington Ellsworth Lindsey (December 20, 1862 – April 5, 1926) was an American politician and the third governor of New Mexico.

== Biography ==
Lindsey was born near Armstrongs Mills, Ohio, on December 20, 1862. He was the son of Robert Washington and Julia Anne (Shipman) Lindsey. He graduated from Scio College in 1884. He then worked as a teacher in Ohio, New York, and Illinois. He attended the University of Michigan and completed his LL.B. degree in 1891.

Lindsey practiced law for ten years in Chicago, Illinois, before moving to Portales, New Mexico. He was a Republican and served as United States Commissioner in 1900, County Clerk of Roosevelt County from 1903 to 1905, Assistant District Attorney in Roosevelt County from 1905 to 1909, Mayor of Portales from 1909 to 1910 and a Member of the State Constitutional Convention from 1910 to 1912. He was elected lieutenant governor of New Mexico in 1916.

Governor Ezequiel C. de Baca died in office on February 18, 1917. Lindsey, who was the lieutenant governor, assumed the duties of the governorship. During Lindsey's term in office, First World War measures were initiated, the 'Australian ballot' system was promoted and a corrupt practices bill was lobbied for. Lindsey left office on January 1, 1919.

After serving as governor, Lindsey resumed his private career, primarily working as an attorney. In 1924 he served as a delegate to the Republican National Convention, at which Calvin Coolidge received the party's nomination as presidential candidate.

Lindsey died in Portales, New Mexico, on April 5, 1926. He is buried in Portales Cemetery.

Political offices
Preceded by Ezequiel Cabeza De Baca	Lieutenant Governor of New Mexico; 1917	Succeeded by Vacant
Preceded by Ezequiel Cabeza De Baca	Governor of New Mexico; 1917–1919	Succeeded by Octaviano Ambrosio Larrazolo
