= William C. McDonald (New Mexico politician) =

1st Governor of New Mexico

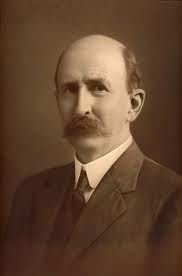

1st Governor of New Mexico
- In office January 6, 1912 – January 1, 1917
- Lieutenant: Ezequiel Cabeza De Baca
- Preceded by: William J. Mills as Territorial Governor
- Succeeded by: Ezequiel Cabeza De Baca

Personal details
- Born: July 25, 1858 Jordanville, New York, U.S.
- Died: April 11, 1918 (aged 59) El Paso, Texas, U.S.
- Party: Democratic
- Spouse: Francis McCourt

William Calhoun McDonald (July 25, 1858 – April 11, 1918) was an American politician, and the first governor of New Mexico.

== Biography ==
McDonald was born in Jordanville, New York, and was raised in New York. He attended Cazenovia Seminary. In New York, he studied law and taught primary school.

== Career ==
In 1878, McDonald moved to Fort Scott, Kansas, where he served as an apprentice at the law offices of Joseph S. Lorrence. He was admitted to the bar in 1880. That same year, McDonald moved to White Oaks, Lincoln County, New Mexico Territory. Staking out mining claims and working as a mineral surveyor, he managed and later purchased the Carrizozo Cattle Ranch Company. He became a United States deputy mineral surveyor for New Mexico in 1881, and became active in Democratic politics.

McDonald was Lincoln County Assessor from 1885 to 1887. In 1891, he was a member of the New Mexico Territorial House of Representatives. He married Francis J. McCourt on August 31, 1891. The couple had five children. He chaired the Lincoln County Board of Commissioners from 1895 to 1897. A member of the New Mexico Cattle Sanitary Board from 1905 to 1911, he also chaired the 1910 Democratic Territorial Central Committee.

Securing the Democratic nomination, McDonald was elected the first Governor of the state of New Mexico on November 7, 1911. During his tenure, various laws affecting working conditions were passed, together with a law that allowed municipalities and counties (as noted by one study) “to provide some minimum level of assistance to the poor.” In addition, the state's government was structured, and raids by Mexican bandits were dealt with.

After his governorship, McDonald was appointed and served as New Mexico Fuel Administrator, an office he held until his death.

== Death ==
McDonald died in El Paso, Texas on April 11, 1918, and is interred at Cedarvale Cemetery in White Oaks.

Party political offices
First	Democratic nominee for Governor of New Mexico; 1911	Succeeded by Ezequiel Cabeza De Baca
Political offices
Preceded by William J. Mills; Territorial Governor	Governor of New Mexico; 1912–1917	Succeeded by Ezequiel Cabeza De Baca
