= Ezequiel Cabeza De Baca =

2nd Governor of New Mexico

Ezequiel De Baca
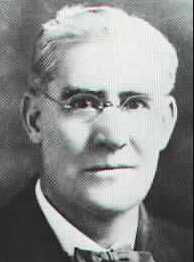

2nd Governor of New Mexico
- In office January 1, 1917 – February 18, 1917
- Lieutenant: Washington Lindsay
- Preceded by: William McDonald
- Succeeded by: Washington Lindsay

1st Lieutenant Governor of New Mexico
- In office January 6, 1912 – January 1, 1917
- Governor: William McDonald
- Preceded by: Position established
- Succeeded by: Washington Lindsay

Personal details
- Born: Ezequiel Cabeza De Baca; November 1, 1864 Las Vegas, New Mexico, U.S.
- Died: February 18, 1917 (aged 52) Santa Fe, New Mexico, U.S.
- Party: Democratic
- Spouse: Margarita De Baca
- Education: Regis University (attended)

Ezequiel Cabeza De Baca (November 1, 1864 – February 18, 1917) was the first Hispano elected for office as lieutenant governor of New Mexico's first election. His term as lieutenant governor was followed by his election as the second elected governor of New Mexico. This term was brief as he died shortly after taking office. He was the state's first elected Hispanic governor, and the first governor born in New Mexico after its annexation by the United States.

== Early life ==
He was born in Las Vegas, New Mexico Territory, on November 1, 1864. He studied at the Jesuit College, now Regis University, in Las Vegas, NM. He worked for the railroads before becoming an influential journalist and Editor of La Voz de Pueblo. Ezequiel C. de Baca was married on December 14, 1889, to Margarita C. de Baca at Peña Blanca, NM. He is a descendant of the original Spanish settlers who later became part of the Baca Family of New Mexico.

In 1891, he began working for the Las Vegas Spanish weekly newspaper La Voz del Pueblo. He subsequently became associated with the newspaper's publishers, Antonio Lucero (who would become New Mexico's first Secretary of State) and Felix Martinez (who would later found the Martinez Publishing Company).

De Baca served as a delegate to the Democratic National Convention in 1900. In 1912, after New Mexico became a state, he became its first Lieutenant Governor, serving from 1912 to 1917. It is during this period when he did his most important work for the State. He was a key to developing New Mexico's first state constitution which includes specific language about providing bilingual education to all citizens. His professional background as a journalist gave him deep insights into the needs of the citizens of New Mexico, which were further enriched by his travels around the state prior to being elected Lt. Governor. He did not want to pursue elected office to run for governor but was vigorously lobbied by the party and ultimately consented. At the time the pay for these elected officials was very small and he had by now a large family. Although his failing health prevented him from taking a significant part in his own campaign, he was elected the Governor of New Mexico on November 7, 1916. Inaugurated on January 1, 1917, he was sworn into office on his sick bed in St. Vincent Sanitarium in Santa Fe, with only a score of persons attending.

He died on February 18, 1917, in office. He had been sick for a long period of time and had traveled to California for treatments, which were not successful. He was buried in the Mount Calvary Cemetery in Las Vegas, New Mexico.

De Baca County is named for Governor de Baca.

== Children ==
Ezequiel and Margarita Cabeza de Baca had 14 children, 5 of whom died in infancy.

- Adolfo Amado C de Baca 1890–1953
- Alvar Nunez C de Baca 1892–1892
- Horacio Virgilio C de Baca 1893–1893
- Margarita Esefan C de Baca de Martinez 1895–1969
- Jose C de Baca 1897–1897
- Horacio C de Baca 1898–1970
- Maria Juana C de Baca 1900–1902
- Celia C de Baca 1902–1996
- Hortencia C de Baca 1903–1996
- Alfonso C de Baca 1907–1951
- Maria Natalia Adeleida C de Baca 1909–1973
- Ezequiel C de Baca 1911–1911
- Adelina C de Baca 1913–2009
- Alicia C de Baca 1916–2010

== See also ==
- Baca Family of New Mexico
- List of minority governors and lieutenant governors in the United States

Political offices
New office	Lieutenant Governor of New Mexico; 1912–1917	Succeeded by Washington Lindsey
Preceded by William McDonald	Governor of New Mexico; 1917	Succeeded by Washington Lindsey
Party political offices
Preceded by William McDonald	Democratic nominee for Governor of New Mexico; 1916	Succeeded by Félix García
