= Benjamin F. Pankey =

American politician (1861–1929)

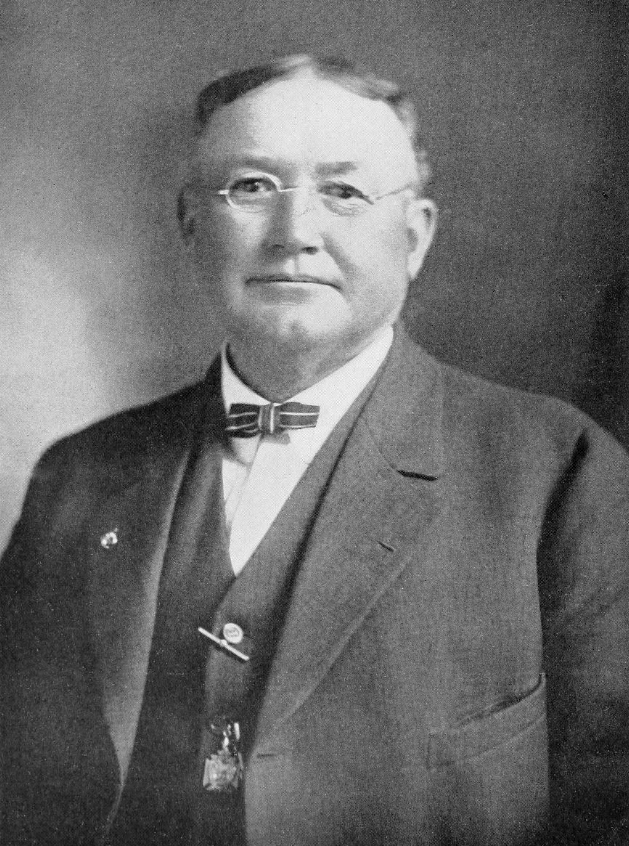

6th New Mexico Commissioner of Public Lands
- In office January 1, 1927 – June 1, 1929
- Governor: Richard C. Dillon
- Preceded by: Edwin B. Swope
- Succeeded by: Austin D. Crile

3rd Lieutenant Governor of New Mexico
- In office January 1, 1919 – January 1, 1921
- Governor: Octaviano Ambrosio Larrazolo
- Preceded by: Washington Ellsworth Lindsey
- Succeeded by: William H. Duckworth

Personal details
- Born: Benjamin Franklin Pankey; August 16, 1861 Harrisburg, Illinois, U.S.
- Died: June 1, 1929 (aged 67) Santa Fe, New Mexico, U.S.
- Party: Republican

Benjamin Franklin Pankey (August 16, 1861 – June 1, 1929) was an American politician who served as the third lieutenant governor of New Mexico from 1919 to 1921 and as the 6th New Mexico Commissioner of Public Lands from 1927 to 1929.

== Biography ==
Benjamin F. Pankey was born in Harrisburg, Illinois on August 10, 1861.

He died in Santa Fe, New Mexico on June 1, 1929.
