= 1918 New Mexico gubernatorial election =

- November 5, 1918
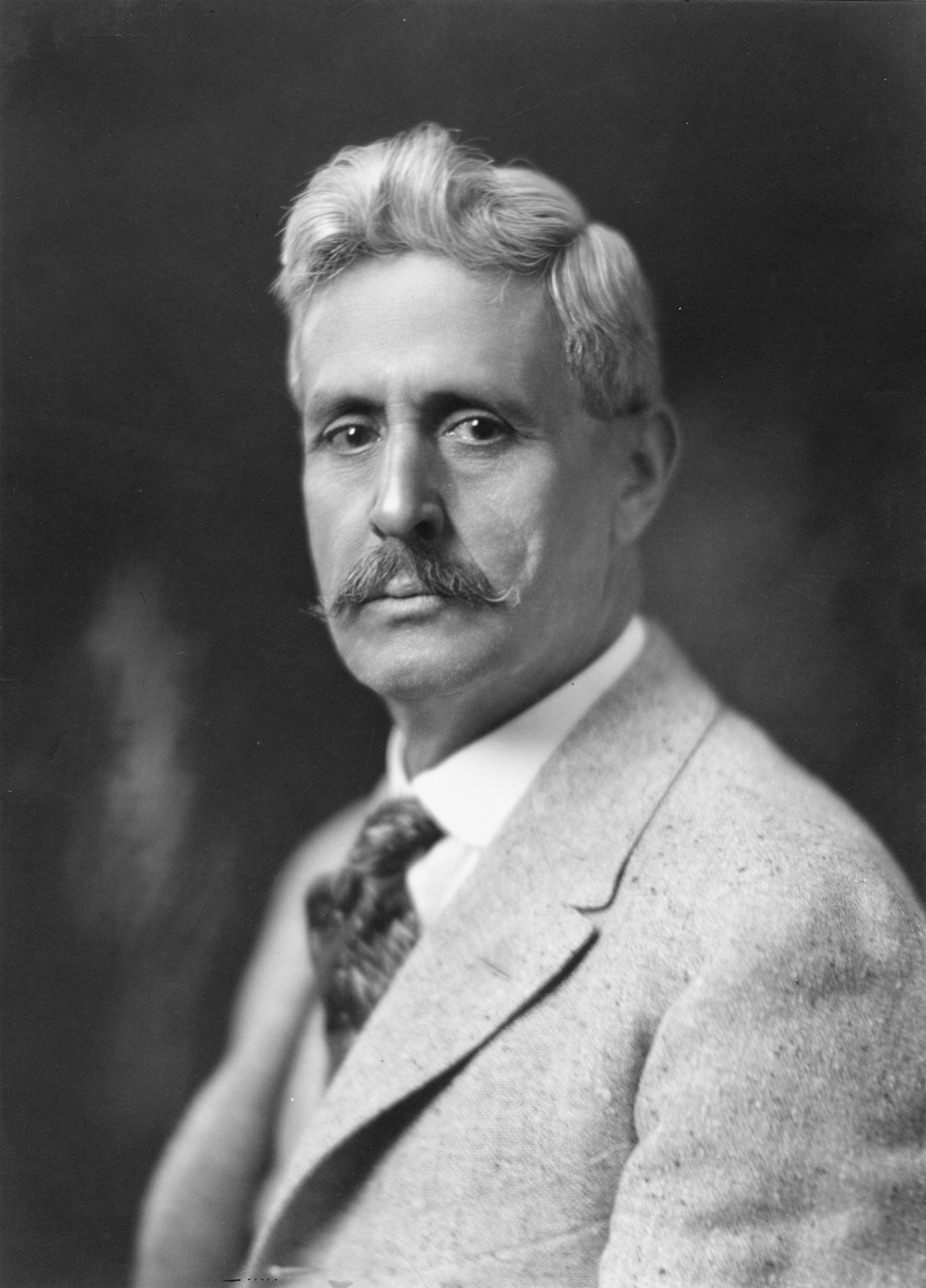

Nominee	Octaviano Ambrosio Larrazolo	Felix Garcia
Party	Republican	Democratic
Popular vote	23,752	22,433
Percentage	50.49%	47.68%
- County results Larrazolo: 50–60% 60–70% 80–90% Garcia: 40–50% 50–60% 60–70% 70–80% 80–90% 90–100%
Governor before election
Washington Ellsworth Lindsey
Republican
Elected Governor
Octaviano Ambrosio Larrazolo
Republican

The 1918 New Mexico gubernatorial election was held on November 5, 1918.

Incumbent Republican Governor Washington Ellsworth Lindsey lost the Republican nomination.

Republican nominee Octaviano Ambrosio Larrazolo defeated Democratic nominee Felix Garcia with 50.50% of the vote.

== General election ==
=== Candidates ===
- Felix Garcia, Democratic, member of the state tax commission
- Octaviano Ambrosio Larrazolo, Republican, Democratic nominee for New Mexico Territory's at-large congressional district in 1906 and 1908
- Allen H. Moulton, Socialist

=== Results ===
1918 New Mexico gubernatorial election
Party	Candidate	Votes	%	±%
Republican	Octaviano Ambrosio Larrazolo	23,752	50.49%	+3.08%
Democratic	Felix Garcia	22,433	47.68%	−1.72%
Socialist	Allen H. Moulton	847	1.80%	−1.39%
	Scattering	15	0.03%	
Majority		1,319	2.80%	
Total votes		47,047	100.00%	
Republican hold		Swing	+4.79%	

=== Results by county ===
County	Octaviano A. Larrazolo Republican		Felix Garcia Democratic		Allen H. Moulton Socialist		Scattering Write-in		Margin		Total votes cast
County	#	%	#	%	#	%	#	%	#	%	Total votes cast
Bernalillo	2,096	55.39%	1,650	43.60%	38	1.00%	0	0.00%	446	11.79%	3,784
Chaves	456	30.14%	1,022	67.55%	33	2.18%	2	0.13%	-566	-37.41%	1,513
Colfax	1,405	53.36%	1,150	43.68%	78	2.96%	0	0.00%	255	9.68%	2,633
Curry	280	22.45%	906	72.65%	61	4.89%	0	0.00%	-626	-50.20%	1,247
De Baca	151	26.08%	404	69.78%	24	4.15%	0	0.00%	-253	-43.70%	579
Doña Ana	1,153	61.20%	722	38.32%	9	0.48%	0	0.00%	431	22.88%	1,884
Eddy	255	27.75%	648	70.51%	15	1.63%	1	0.11%	-393	-42.76%	919
Grant	1,173	39.91%	1,639	55.77%	119	4.05%	8	0.27%	-466	-15.86%	2,939
Guadalupe	681	51.40%	639	48.23%	5	0.38%	0	0.00%	42	3.17%	1,325
Lea	30	7.89%	348	91.58%	2	0.53%	0	0.00%	-318	-83.68%	380
Lincoln	652	49.54%	634	48.18%	27	2.05%	3	0.23%	18	1.37%	1,316
Luna	366	33.52%	685	62.73%	41	3.75%	0	0.00%	-319	-29.21%	1,092
McKinley	568	55.74%	439	43.08%	12	1.18%	0	0.00%	129	12.66%	1,019
Mora	1,202	51.65%	1,098	47.19%	27	1.16%	0	0.00%	104	4.47%	2,327
Otero	447	45.94%	492	50.57%	34	3.49%	0	0.00%	-45	-4.62%	973
Quay	382	28.51%	879	65.60%	79	5.90%	0	0.00%	-497	-37.09%	1,340
Rio Arriba	1,487	54.99%	1,216	44.97%	1	0.04%	0	0.00%	271	10.02%	2,704
Roosevelt	112	14.93%	607	80.93%	30	4.00%	1	0.13%	-495	-66.00%	750
San Juan	317	40.03%	464	58.59%	11	1.39%	0	0.00%	-147	-18.56%	792
San Miguel	2,591	66.20%	1,305	33.34%	18	0.46%	0	0.00%	1,286	32.86%	3,914
Sandoval	617	56.76%	467	42.96%	3	0.28%	0	0.00%	150	13.80%	1,087
Santa Fe	1,447	60.72%	925	38.82%	11	0.46%	0	0.00%	522	21.91%	2,383
Sierra	339	46.63%	378	51.99%	10	1.38%	0	0.00%	-39	-5.36%	727
Socorro	1,542	63.59%	869	35.84%	14	0.58%	0	0.00%	673	27.75%	2,425
Taos	858	61.20%	541	38.59%	3	0.21%	0	0.00%	317	22.61%	1,402
Torrance	796	55.12%	614	42.52%	34	2.35%	0	0.00%	182	12.60%	1,444
Union	1,082	41.95%	1,394	54.05%	103	3.99%	0	0.00%	-312	-12.10%	2,579
Valencia	1,267	80.70%	298	18.98%	5	0.32%	0	0.00%	969	61.72%	1,570
Total	23,752	50.49%	22,433	47.68%	847	1.80%	15	0.03%	1,319	2.80%	47,047

==== Counties that flipped from Democratic to Republican ====
- Colfax
- Guadalupe
- Mora
- Sandoval

==== Counties that flipped from Republican to Democratic ====
- Grant
- Sierra
