= Tibo J. Chávez =

American politician

Tibo Chávez

Member of the New Mexico Senate
- In office 1948–1950; 1956–1974

15th Lieutenant Governor of New Mexico
- In office January 1, 1951 – January 1, 1955
- Governor: Edwin L. Mechem
- Preceded by: Joseph Montoya
- Succeeded by: Joseph Montoya

Personal details
- Born: Tibo Juan Chávez; 1912
- Died: 1991 (aged 78–79)
- Party: Democratic
- Education: University of New Mexico (BA); Georgetown University (LLB)

Tibo Juan Chávez (1912 – 1991) was an American attorney, politician, and judge who served as the 15th lieutenant governor of New Mexico. Chávez also served separate terms in the New Mexico Senate.

== Education ==
Chávez earned a Bachelor of Arts from the University of New Mexico and Bachelor of Laws from the Georgetown University Law Center.

== Career ==
During World War II, he served in the U.S. Embassy in Chile. Chávez then returned to New Mexico and was elected to the New Mexico Senate in 1948. He served until 1950, after which he was selected to serve as lieutenant governor of New Mexico. In 1954, Chávez was again elected to the New Mexico Senate, serving until 1974. Chávez was a candidate in the 1974 New Mexico gubernatorial election, placing second in Democratic primary. From 1979 until his death in 1991, he served as a judge of the New Mexico District Court. Chávez also owned a private legal practice, which is still operated by his sons.

After his death, Chávez's papers were donated to the University of New Mexico–Valencia Campus in Los Lunas, New Mexico.

== See also ==
- List of minority governors and lieutenant governors in the United States
