= Hiram M. Dow =

American politician

Hiram Dow

10th Lieutenant Governor of New Mexico
- In office January 1, 1937 – January 1, 1939
- Governor: Clyde Tingley
- Preceded by: Louis Cabeza de Baca
- Succeeded by: James Murray, Sr.

Personal details
- Born: Hiram Millet Dow; April 21, 1885 Cotulla, Texas, U.S.
- Died: March 7, 1969 (aged 83) Roswell, New Mexico, U.S.
- Party: Democratic
- Education: New Mexico Military Institute (AS); Washington and Lee University (LLB)

Hiram Millet Dow (April 21, 1885 – March 7, 1969) was an American attorney and politician who served as the tenth lieutenant governor of New Mexico from January 1, 1937 to January 1, 1939.

== Early life and education ==
Down was born in Cotulla, Texas and raised in Seven Rivers, New Mexico. After graduating from the New Mexico Military Institute in 1905, he earned a Bachelor of Laws from the Washington and Lee University School of Law in 1908.

== Career ==
After graduating from law school, Dow later settled in Roswell, New Mexico, working as a lawyer and serving as the city's mayor. He was also the president of the New Mexico Bar Association and New Mexico Board of Bar Commissioners. Dow was elected lieutenant governor of New Mexico in 1936 and assumed office in 1936. He served for one term under Governor Clyde Tingley.
