= José A. Baca =

American politician

5th Lieutenant Governor of New Mexico
- In office January 1, 1923 – May 17, 1924
- Governor: James F. Hinkle
- Preceded by: William H. Duckworth
- Succeeded by: Edward G. Sargent

Personal details
- Born: June 23, 1876
- Died: May 17, 1924 (aged 47)
- Party: Democratic
- Spouse: Marguerite P. Baca (m. 1897)
- Relatives: Baca family of New Mexico

José A. Baca (June 23, 1876 – May 17, 1924) was an American politician from New Mexico. He served as the fifth lieutenant governor of New Mexico from January 1, 1923, until his death on May 17, 1924.

== Early life ==
Baca was born in Las Vegas, New Mexico, on June 23, 1876. A member of the Baca family of New Mexico, Baca raised livestock on his ranch in Rociada. He married Marguerite Pendaries on June 23, 1897.

== Lieutenant governor ==
In 1922, the New Mexico Democratic Party nominated Baca for lieutenant governor of New Mexico. After winning the November election, he was sworn into office on January 1, 1923.

When Governor Hinkle left the state for a conference on October 8, 1923, Baca became acting governor. While serving as acting governor, he declared Columbus Day to be a state holiday and proclaimed October 27 to be Navy Day. Baca made an appointment to the board of regents and commuted the sentence of a prisoner.

== Personal life ==
Baca and his wife had six children. Marguerite served as secretary of state of New Mexico from 1931 to 1936.

Baca died of pneumonia on May 17, 1924. He was buried in Las Vegas, New Mexico.

== See also ==
- List of minority governors and lieutenant governors in the United States
