= Holm O. Bursum =

United States Senator from New Mexico

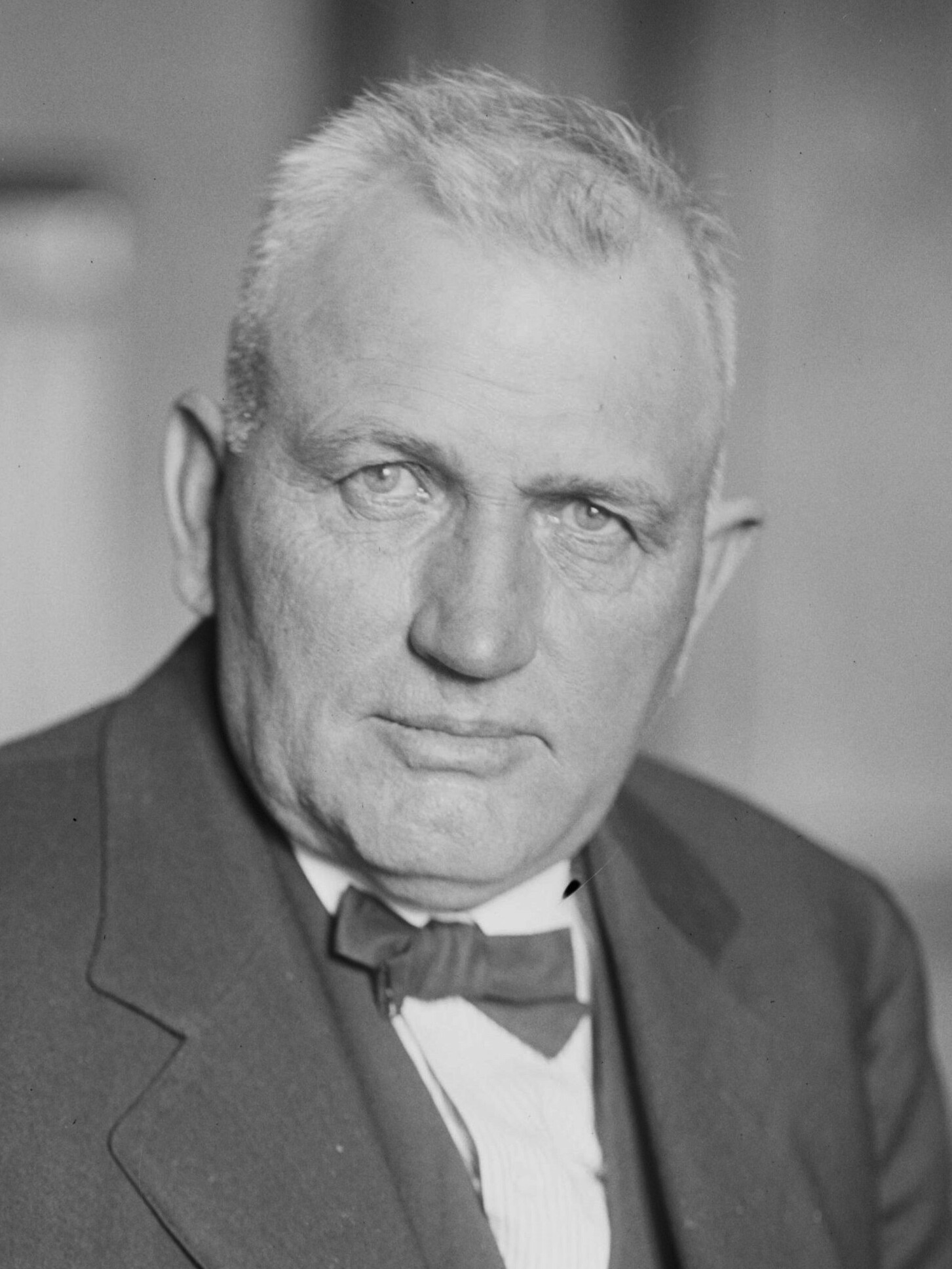

United States Senator from New Mexico
- In office March 11, 1921 – March 3, 1925
- Preceded by: Albert B. Fall
- Succeeded by: Sam G. Bratton

Personal details
- Born: Holm Olaf Bursum; February 10, 1867 Fort Dodge, Iowa, U.S.
- Died: August 7, 1953 (aged 86) Colorado Springs, Colorado, U.S.
- Party: Republican

Holm Olaf Bursum (February 10, 1867 – August 7, 1953) was a politician from the U.S. state of New Mexico, whose activities were instrumental for gaining statehood under the Taft administration and later served as United States Senator from New Mexico.

== Background ==
Bursum was born at Fort Dodge, Iowa to Norwegian-American parents. He attended the public schools in Iowa before moving to New Mexico Territory in 1881. He settled near Socorro and engaged in raising livestock.

== Political career ==
He was a member of the New Mexico Territorial senate, 1899–1900; chairman of the Territorial central committee in 1905 and 1911; member of the State constitutional convention in 1910; and a member of the Republican National Committee, 1920-1924.

Bursum was appointed on March 11, 1921, and subsequently elected on September 20, 1921, as a Republican to the United States Senate to fill the vacancy caused by the resignation of Albert B. Fall and served from March 11, 1921, to March 3, 1925. He was an unsuccessful candidate for reelection in 1924. He served as chairman, Committee on Pensions (Sixty-seventh and Sixty-eighth Congresses). Subsequently, Holm Bursum pursued a newspaper career in Washington, D.C. and in New Mexico until his death in 1953.

== Later years ==
Bursum subsequently returned to Socorro and resumed his former business interests until his death in Colorado Springs, Colorado. He is interred in Socorro Protestant Cemetery in Socorro.

Through his sister Ruth Bursum's marriage, he is connected to the Paxton family, a name of equal prominence in New Mexico. Holm Bursum's name can either be spelled Bursum or Bursom. The name is pronounced Ber-sum.

The Bursum House is listed on the National Register of Historic Places.

In 1965, he was inducted into the Hall of Great Westerners of the National Cowboy & Western Heritage Museum.

== Other sources ==
- Fernlund, Kevin Jon. Senator Holm O. Bursum and the Mexican Ring, 1921-1924 (New Mexico Historical Review 66. October 1991)
- Moorman, Donald Raymond A Political Biography of Holm O. Bursum: 1899-1924 (Ph.D. dissertation, University of New Mexico, 1962)

Party political offices
First	Republican nominee for Governor of New Mexico; 1911, 1916	Succeeded by Octaviano Ambrosio Larrazolo
Preceded by Albert B. Fall	Republican nominee for U.S. Senator from New Mexico (Class 2); 1921, 1924	Succeeded by Herbert B. Holt
U.S. Senate
Preceded by Albert B. Fall	U.S. senator (Class 2) from New Mexico; 1921–1925; Served alongside: Andrieus A. Jones	Succeeded by Sam G. Bratton
