= Octaviano Ambrosio Larrazolo =

American politician (1859–1930)

Octaviano Larrazolo
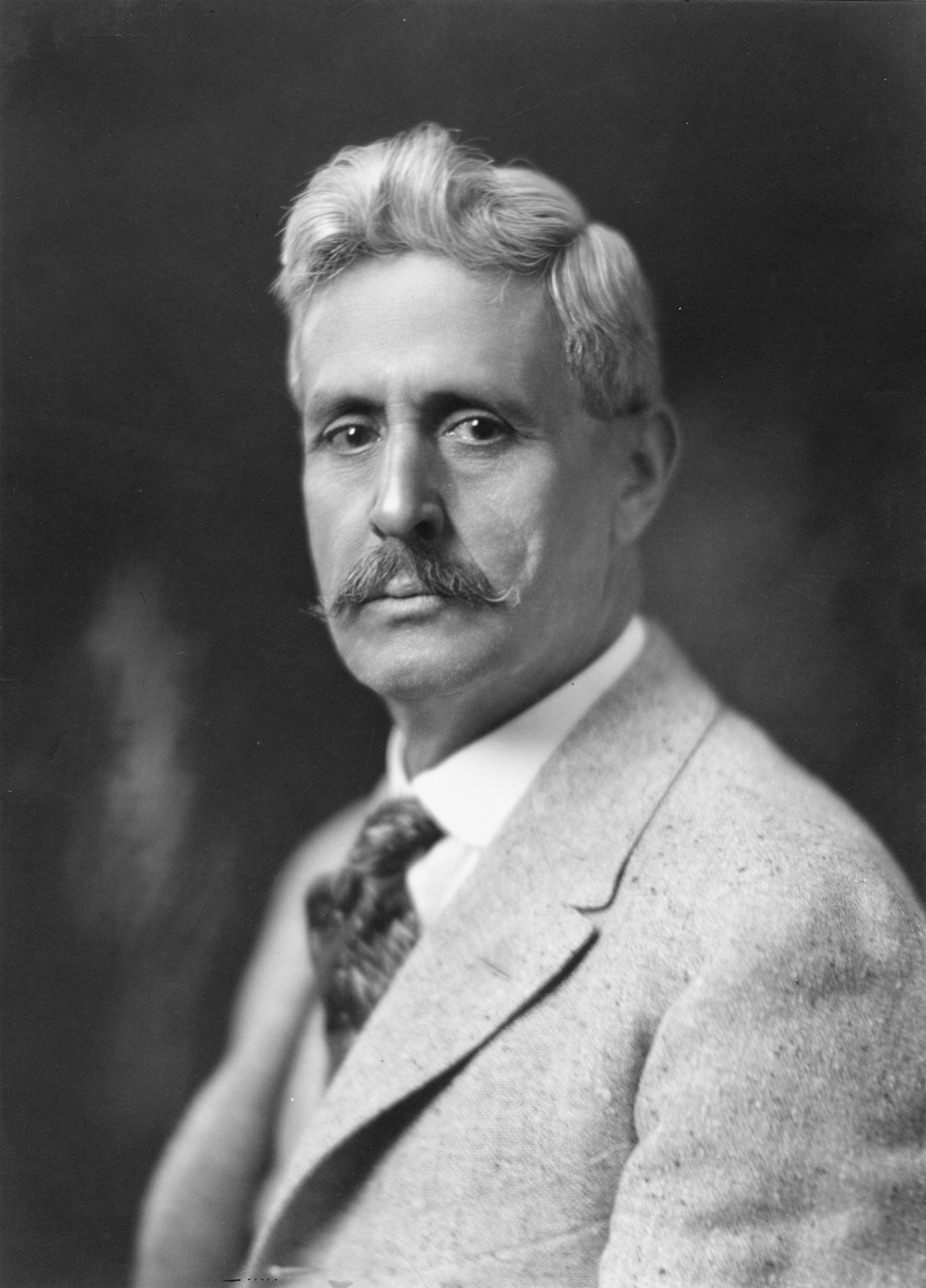
- Larrazolo, c. 1919

United States Senator from New Mexico
- In office December 7, 1928 – March 3, 1929
- Preceded by: Bronson M. Cutting
- Succeeded by: Bronson M. Cutting

4th Governor of New Mexico
- In office January 1, 1919 – January 1, 1921
- Lieutenant: Benjamin F. Pankey
- Preceded by: Washington Lindsey
- Succeeded by: Merritt C. Mechem

Personal details
- Born: Octaviano Ambrosio Larrazolo Corral; December 7, 1859 Valle de Allende, Chihuahua, Mexico
- Died: April 7, 1930 (aged 70) Albuquerque, New Mexico, U.S.
- Party: Republican (1884–1895, 1911–1930); Democratic (1895–1911)
- Spouse(s): Rosalía Cobos (m. 1881-1891, her death); María García (m. 1892-1930, his death)
- Education: St. Michael's College (BA)
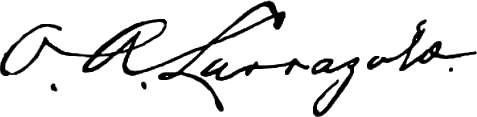
- Signature

Octaviano Ambrosio Larrazolo Corral (December 7, 1859 – April 7, 1930) was a Mexican-born American lawyer and politician who served as the fourth governor of New Mexico and as a United States senator from New Mexico, the first Hispanic American to hold that role.

== Early life ==
Larrazolo was born in Valle de Allende in Chihuahua, Mexico, on December 7, 1859, to Don Octaviano, a wealthy landowner, and Doña Donaciana Corral de Larrazolo. He was brought up in a wealthy home and was taught to read and write in his home; he later briefly attended school in his town but left after his schoolteacher beat him. In 1863, French soldiers ransacked the Larrazolo home because the family supported Benito Juárez's revolt against the French.

In 1870 at the age of eleven, Larrazolo left Mexico for Tucson, Arizona Territory, under the care of Jean Salpointe, a French-born bishop of Arizona. Larrazolo left with the bishop because he intended to study theology to become a priest and because his family had fallen into bankruptcy and could not support his schooling. After completing his primary studies with the bishop, Larrazolo studied theology at the St. Michael's College at Santa Fe, New Mexico Territory, graduating in 1876 at the age of 18. He considered entering the priesthood right after his graduation but secured a teaching position instead; he later also taught in El Paso County, Texas. Meanwhile, he started studying law; he taught in the day and studied law at night. On December 11, 1884, Larrazolo became a U.S. citizen in order to prepare himself to become a lawyer. In this same year, he registered with the Texas state branch of the Republican Party.

Larrazolo was admitted to the Texas state bar in 1888. He was elected district attorney for the Western District of Texas in 1890 and reelected in 1892. He held the position until 1894.

Larrazolo moved to Las Vegas, New Mexico Territory, in 1895. He practiced law in that town and became involved in Democratic politics, focusing on civil rights for the Mexicans and Hispanos who then comprised two thirds of New Mexico's population. Larrazolo had difficulty finding success as a Democrat in New Mexico because most Hispanics in that state identified as Republicans at the time. That difficulty is shown by the fact that he narrowly lost elections to become Territorial Delegate to the U.S. Congress in 1900, 1906 and 1908 though the 1908 election was extremely close and subject to several credible charges of fraud.

== Political career ==
In 1910, Larrazolo attacked the machine politics in New Mexico that he felt were exploiting Hispanic voters across the state. He feared New Mexico was close to becoming like the South where Jim Crow laws stripped African Americans of their rights. In a speech, he said "you [Hispanics].. have allowed yourselves to be controlled by other men but you will be controlled by bosses only as long as you permit the yoke to rest on you.... Every native citizen must unite in supporting this constitution because it secures to you people of New Mexico your rights—every one of them; the rights also of your children and in such a manner that they can never be taken away... if you want to acquire your freedom and transmit this sacred heritage in the land hallowed by the blood of your forefathers who fought to protect it...Do not wait until you are put in the position of Arizona which in two years will be able to disfranchise every Spanish speaking citizen."

In 1911, the New Mexican Territory held a constitutional convention in preparation for its entering the Union. Larrazolo was one of the Hispanic delegates to be chosen to attend the convention; however, the State Convention of the Democratic Party denied his request for half of all statewide nominees to be Hispanic to represent the 60 percent of the population of New Mexico that was Hispanic.

Despite this, Larrazolo had considerable success in implementing measures in the New Mexico Constitution to ensure that the rights and representation of the Spanish-speaking and Hispanic-descendant population of New Mexico would be protected when New Mexico entered the Union. The new Bill of Rights stated, "The rights, privileges and immunities, civil, political and religious, guaranteed to the people of New Mexico by the Treaty of Guadalupe Hidalgo shall be preserved inviolate" (Article II Section V). The Education Article (Article XII, Section 8), gave the legislature authority to provide training for teachers in public schools so that "they may become proficient in both the English and Spanish languages, to qualify them to teach Spanish-speaking pupils...." Section 10 of the article assured the right of children of Spanish descent to attend public education institutions and prohibited the establishment of separate schools.

State Democrats unsuccessfully tried to prevent the ratification of the state constitution due to these provisions. Consequently, Larrazolo would then become a Republican, which he would remain for the rest of his life.

Even though many New Mexico politicians resented him, Larrazolo still managed to gain a lot of political credibility, especially amongst Hispanic voters. His popularity throughout New Mexico caused the New Mexico Republican party to nominate him for governor of New Mexico. The campaign in 1918, however, was an intense one that exposed some factions within the Hispanic population. His Democratic opponent, Félix García, claimed that Larrazolo's birth in Chihuahua precluded him from understanding the concerns of "native New Mexicans." Still, Larrazolo was elected Governor of New Mexico in 1918 and became the first native-born Mexican to be governor of New Mexico; his narrow victory seemed to quiet most of the debate about whether he could authentically advocate on behalf of the Hispanic population.

Throughout his time as governor, he had various controversies and successes. In the first year of his term, the rampant fear of anarchism and the gravity of a coal-mining strike convinced Larrazolo to declare martial law to suppress the strike. He was also criticized for pardoning Mexican troops who raided parts of New Mexico with Pancho Villa. He believed that since the Mexican troops were acting under orders from their superior, they should not be held accountable. He also supported and signed a new income tax law, which angered his Republican Party. The aspects that he won praise for were his support for the creation of the League of Nations, advocacy for bilingual education, and support for the civil rights of Mexican immigrants in the state. He was also a supporter of the women's suffrage amendment to the United States Constitution.

Since he angered the Republican Party many times throughout his time as governor, the New Mexico Republican Party did not renominate Larrazolo to be governor of New Mexico. He would then briefly return to El Paso County, Texas, to practice law, where he opened a firm in El Paso with Nick Meyer and practiced in both New Mexico and Mexico. In 1922, Larrazolo opened an office in Albuquerque as well.

Larrazolo did not stay out of politics for too long. In 1923, the state legislature of New Mexico nominated him to become governor of Puerto Rico. He lost that bid but used the jolt of political popularity that he received by his consideration to be appointed governor of Puerto Rico to re-enter politics in New Mexico. He ran and lost an election to become a justice of the New Mexico Supreme Court in 1924.

However, he was elected in 1927 to the New Mexico State House of Representatives. In 1927, however, the Democratic U.S. Senator from New Mexico Andrieus Jones died. Larrazolo ran for and on November 6, 1928 won Jones's remaining term, which made Larrazolo the first Mexican-American to serve in the U.S. Senate. He was now elderly and infirm, and so he attended only one session of Congress and introduced one legislative action, calling for the establishment of an industrial school in New Mexico for the Spanish-speaking youth to promote equal opportunity, before his term ended with that of the 70th United States Congress.

Having been ill throughout his brief Senate term, Larrazolo died on April 7, 1930.

== See also ==
- List of Hispanic and Latino Americans in the United States Congress
- List of United States senators born outside the United States

Party political offices
Preceded by Holm O. Bursum	Republican nominee for Governor of New Mexico; 1918	Succeeded by Merritt C. Mechem
Preceded by Stephen B. Davis	Republican nominee for U.S. Senator from New Mexico (Class 1); 1928	Succeeded by Bronson M. Cutting
U.S. House of Representatives
Preceded by Washington Lindsey	Governor of New Mexico; 1919–1921	Succeeded by Merritt C. Mechem
U.S. Senate
Preceded by Bronson M. Cutting	U.S. Senator (Class 1) from New Mexico; 1928–1929; Served alongside: Sam G. Bratton	Succeeded by Bronson M. Cutting
