= Lieutenant Governor of New Mexico =

Elected official

- Vicegobernador de Nuevo México
- Seal of New Mexico

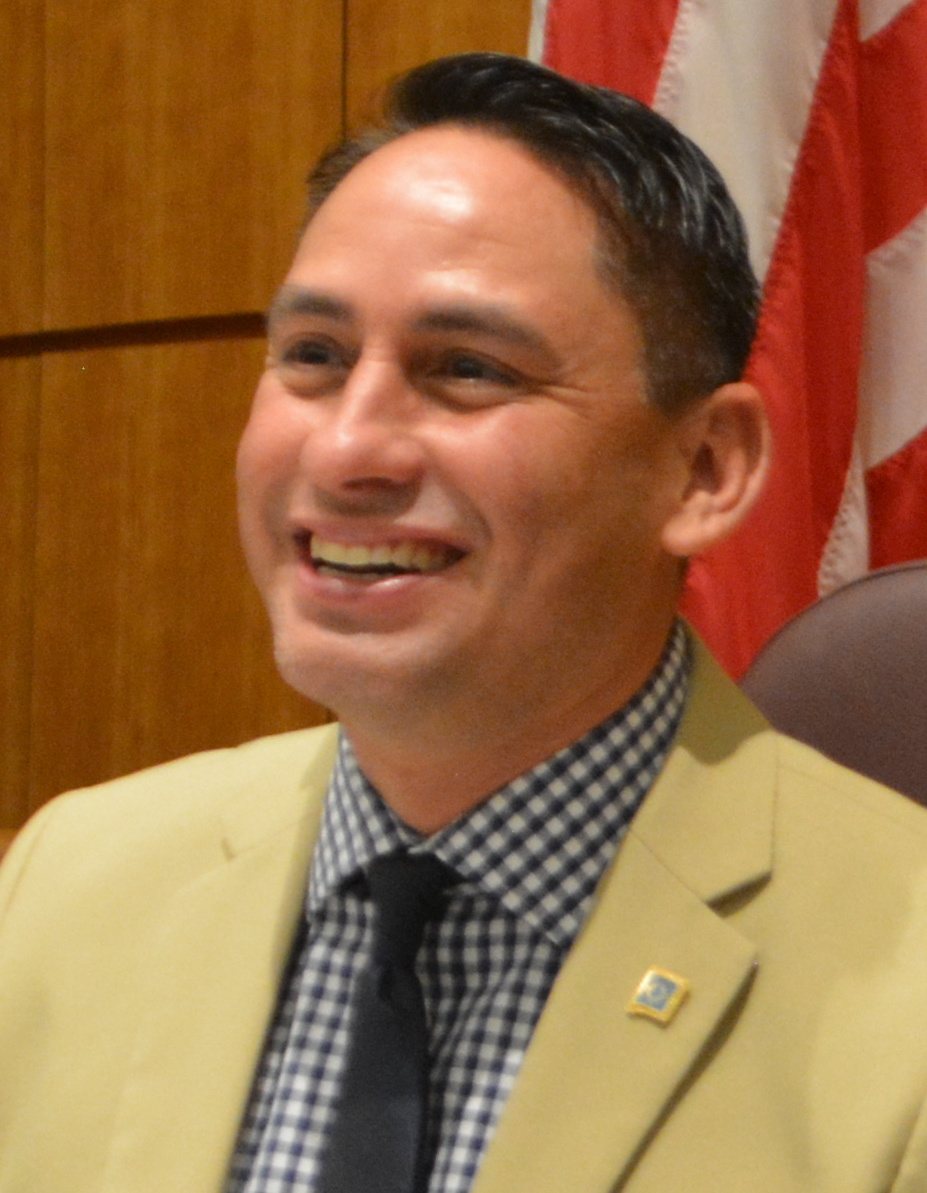
- Incumbent; Howie Morales since January 1, 2019
- Term length: Four years, renewable once consecutively
- Formation: 1912
- First holder: Ezequiel Cabeza De Baca
- Succession: First
- Website: Lieutenant Governor of New Mexico

The lieutenant governor of New Mexico (Spanish: vicegobernador de Nuevo México) is an elected constitutional officer in the executive branch of government of the U.S. state of New Mexico, ranking just below the governor. Thirty individuals have held the office of lieutenant governor since statehood, two of them serving non-consecutively. The incumbent is Howie Morales, a Democrat.

== Election and term of office ==
The lieutenant governor is elected on a joint ticket with the governor for a four-year term. While the governor and lieutenant governor are elected on the same ticket in the general election, the candidates run separately during primary elections.

Prior to November 4, 2008, the New Mexico State Constitution did not provide for the nomination of a replacement for lieutenant governor after the governor's office was succeeded. (Note: this is the reason the number of governors is greater than the number of lieutenant governors.) Section 16 of Article V of the New Mexico State Constitution gives the governor the power to nominate a replacement for lieutenant governor upon confirmation of the nominee by a majority of the State Senate.

== Powers and duties ==
The lieutenant governor is the first person in the gubernatorial line of succession by virtue of the New Mexico Constitution. Thus, the lieutenant governor serves as acting governor whenever the incumbent governor is absent from the state, incapacitated by reason of illness, or impeached by the House of Representatives and otherwise becomes governor in the event of the incumbent's death, resignation, or removal from office. Likewise, the lieutenant governor is ex officio president of the Senate. In this capacity as Senate president, the lieutenant governor has plenary authority to preserve decorum, to rule on points of order, and to certify all instruments of process coming before the Senate. The lieutenant governor may also cast tie-breaking votes, but only when the Senate is equally divided on a question.

Aside from these constitutional functions, the lieutenant governor performs several statutory functions. Foremost among them, the lieutenant governor serves as an ombudsperson for the whole of state government, investigating and attempting to resolve citizen complaints filed by New Mexicans in relation to their dealings with state agencies. The lieutenant governor is also a statutory member of the governor's Cabinet and of various state boards and commissions. (Note: Those boards and commissions are the State Board of Finance, the New Mexico Border Authority, the New Mexico Children’s Cabinet, the Community Development Council, the Military Base Planning Commission, the Mortgage Finance Authority, the New Mexico Spaceport Authority, and the New Mexico Youth Alliance.)

== List of lieutenant governors of New Mexico ==
The office of lieutenant governor was created on January 6, 1912, the year New Mexico was admitted into the Union as the 48th state. Ezequiel Cabeza De Baca served as New Mexico's first lieutenant governor. Over the intervening years, New Mexico has had 27 individuals in the lieutenant governor's office, two of whom have served non-consecutive terms. The last lieutenant governor to succeed to the governorship was Tom Bolack, following the resignation of Edwin L. Mechem on November 30, 1962. Ezequiel Cabeza De Baca is the only lieutenant governor to be elected as governor in a later term.

Democrats (20 lieutenant governors) Republicans (10 lieutenant governors)

#	Image	Lt. Governor	Took office	Left office	Party	Governor(s) served with	Years in office
1		Ezequiel Cabeza De Baca	January 6, 1912	January 1, 1917	Democratic	William C. McDonald	5 (Note: Since the first state election was in an odd-numbered year (1911), the term lasted five years.)
2		Washington E. Lindsey	January 1, 1917	February 18, 1917	Republican	Ezequiel Cabeza De Baca	1 1/6 (Note: Succeeded Governor Ca. de Baca on February 18, 1917 after the Governor's death.)
Office vacant from February 18, 1917 – January 1, 1919						Washington E. Lindsey	
3		Benjamin F. Pankey	January 1, 1919	January 1, 1921	Republican	Octaviano Ambrosio Larrazolo	2
4		William Duckworth	January 1, 1921	January 1, 1923	Republican	Merritt C. Mechem	2
5		José A. Baca	January 1, 1923	May 1924	Democratic	James F. Hinkle	1 1/3 (Note: Died in office in May 1924.)
Office vacant from May [?], 1924 – January 1, 1925						James F. Hinkle	
6		Edward G. Sargent	January 1, 1925	January 1, 1929	Republican	Arthur T. Hannett	4
6		Edward G. Sargent	January 1, 1925	January 1, 1929	Republican	Richard C. Dillon	4
7		Hugh B. Woodward	January 1, 1929	July 1929	Republican	Richard C. Dillon	1/2 (Note: Resigned in July 1929 to accept a U.S. Attorneyship.)
Office vacant from July [?], 1929 – January 1, 1931						Richard C. Dillon	
8		Andrew W. Hockenhull	January 1, 1931	September 25, 1933	Democratic	Arthur Seligman	2 3/4 (Note: Succeeded Governor Seligman on September 25, 1933 after the Governor's death.)
Office vacant from September 25, 1933 – January 1, 1935						Andrew W. Hockenhull	
9		Louis Cabeza de Baca	January 1, 1935	January 1, 1937	Democratic	Clyde Tingley	2
10		Hiram M. Dow	January 1, 1937	January 1, 1939	Democratic	Clyde Tingley	2
11		James Murray, Sr.	January 1, 1939	January 1, 1941	Democratic	John E. Miles	2
12		Ceferino Quintana	January 1, 1941	January 1, 1943	Democratic	John E. Miles	2
13		James B. Jones	January 1, 1943	January 1, 1947	Democratic	John J. Dempsey	4
14		Joseph Montoya	January 1, 1947	January 1, 1951	Democratic	Thomas J. Mabry	4
15		Tibo J. Chávez	January 1, 1951	January 1, 1955	Democratic	Edwin L. Mechem	4
16		Joseph Montoya	January 1, 1955	April 1957	Democratic	John F. Simms	2 1/3 (Note: Resigned in April 1957 to serve as U.S. Representative.)
16		Joseph Montoya	January 1, 1955	April 1957	Democratic	Edwin L. Mechem	2 1/3
Office vacant from April [?], 1957 – January 1, 1959						Edwin L. Mechem	
17		Ed V. Mead	January 1, 1959	January 1, 1961	Democratic	John Burroughs	2
18		Tom Bolack	January 1, 1961	November 30, 1962	Democratic	Edwin L. Mechem	1 5/6 (Note: Succeeded Governor Mechem on November 30, 1962 after the Governor's resignation.)
Office vacant from November 30, 1962 – January 1, 1963						Tom Bolack	
19		Mack Easley	January 1, 1963	January 1, 1967	Democratic	Jack M. Campbell	4
20		Lee Francis	January 1, 1967	January 1, 1971	Republican	David Cargo	4
21		Roberto Mondragón	January 1, 1971	January 1, 1975	Democratic	Bruce King	4
22		Robert E. Ferguson	January 1, 1975	January 1, 1979	Democratic	Jerry Apodaca	4
23		Roberto Mondragón	January 1, 1979	January 1, 1983	Democratic	Bruce King	4
24		Mike Runnels	January 1, 1983	January 1, 1987	Democratic	Toney Anaya	4
25		Jack L. Stahl	January 1, 1987	January 1, 1991	Republican	Garrey Carruthers	4
26		Casey Luna	January 1, 1991	January 1, 1995	Democratic	Bruce King	4
27		Walter D. Bradley	January 1, 1995	January 1, 2003	Republican	Gary Johnson	8
28		Diane Denish	January 1, 2003	January 1, 2011	Democratic	Bill Richardson	8 (Note: First female Lieutenant Governor of New Mexico.)
29		John Sanchez	January 1, 2011	January 1, 2019	Republican	Susana Martinez	8
30		Howie Morales	January 1, 2019	Incumbent	Democratic	Michelle Lujan Grisham	1
