= 1911 New Mexico gubernatorial election =

- November 7, 1911
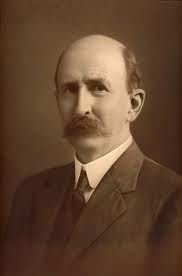

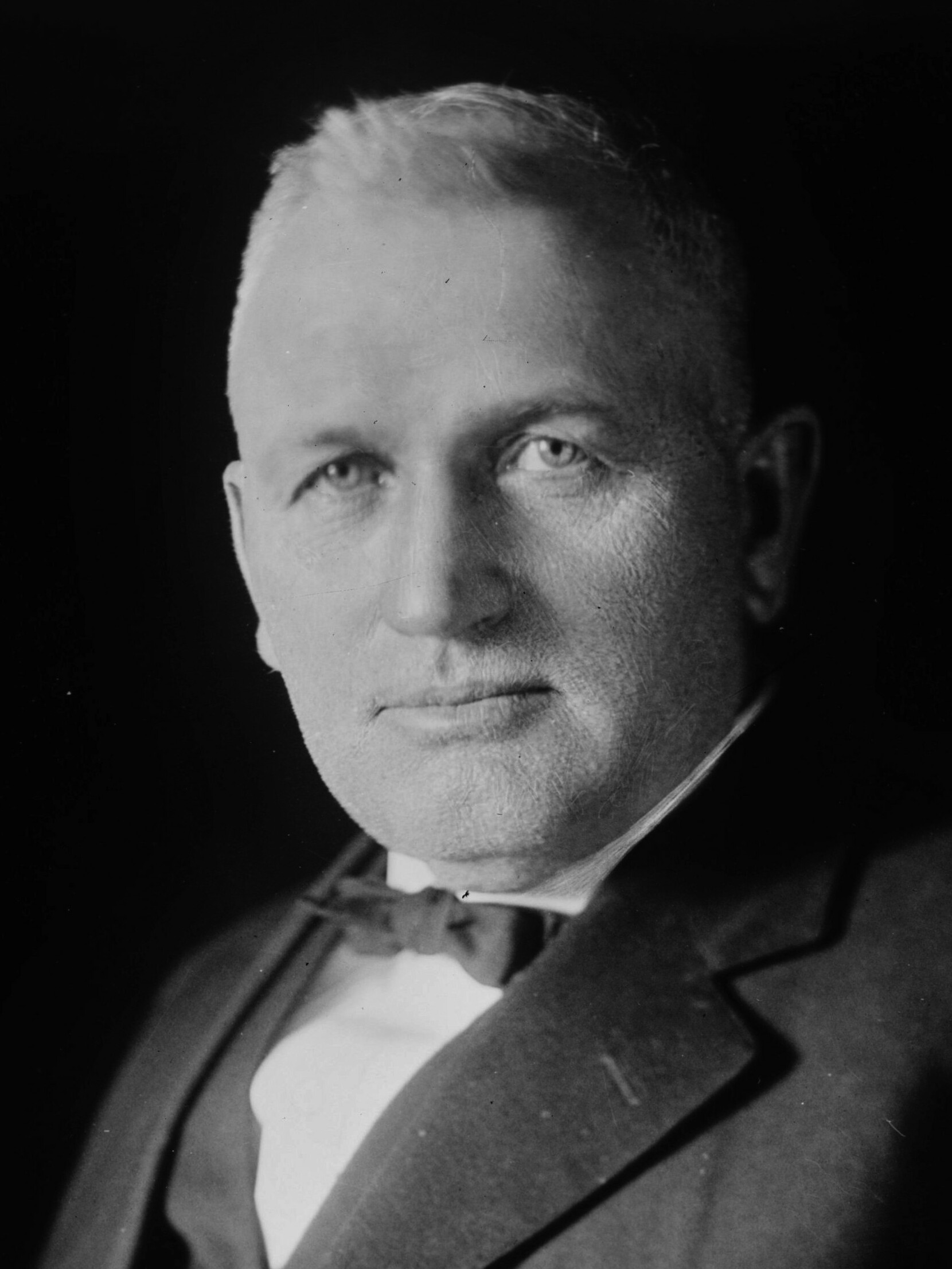
Nominee	William C. McDonald	Holm O. Bursum
Party	Democratic	Republican
Popular vote	31,036	28,019
Percentage	51.01%	46.05%
- County results McDonald: 40–50% 50–60% 60–70% 70–80% Bursum: 40–50% 50–60% 60–70% 80–90%
Elected Governor
William C. McDonald
Democratic

The 1911 New Mexico gubernatorial election was held on November 7, 1911, to elect the first Governor of New Mexico.

Democratic nominee William C. McDonald defeated Republican nominee Holm O. Bursum. New Mexico was admitted to the Union as the 47th state on January 6, 1912, and McDonald assumed office on that date.

== General election ==
=== Candidates ===
- William C. McDonald, Democratic, member of the New Mexico Cattle Sanitary Board
- Holm O. Bursum, Republican, former member of the New Mexico Territorial Senate, member of the State constitutional convention in 1910
- Dr. T. C. Rivera, Socialist

=== Results ===
1911 New Mexico gubernatorial election
Party	Candidate	Votes	%
Democratic	William C. McDonald	31,036	51.01%
Republican	Holm O. Bursum	28,019	46.05%
Socialist	T. C. Rivera	1,787	2.94%
Majority		3,017	4.96%
Total votes		60,842	100.00%
Democratic gain from Republican			

==== By county ====
County	William C. McDonald Democratic		Holm O. Bursum Republican		T. C. Rivera Socialist		Margin		Total
County	#	%	#	%	#	%	#	%	Total
Bernalillo	3,052	61.68%	1,826	36.90%	70	1.41%	1,226	24.78%	4,948
Chaves	1,994	68.66%	645	22.21%	265	9.13%	1,349	46.45%	2,904
Colfax	1,940	54.62%	1,601	45.07%	11	0.31%	339	9.54%	3,552
Curry	988	67.07%	339	23.01%	146	9.91%	649	44.06%	1,473
Doña Ana	1,394	52.00%	1,284	47.89%	3	0.11%	110	4.10%	2,681
Eddy	1,460	76.40%	380	19.88%	71	3.72%	1,080	56.51%	1,911
Grant	1,535	57.95%	1,095	41.34%	19	0.72%	440	16.61%	2,649
Guadalupe	1,035	49.86%	1,018	49.04%	23	1.11%	17	0.82%	2,076
Lincoln	801	52.49%	671	43.97%	54	3.54%	130	8.52%	1,526
Luna	632	66.32%	265	27.81%	56	5.88%	367	38.51%	953
McKinley	409	46.69%	465	53.08%	2	0.23%	-56	-6.39%	876
Mora	1,259	46.49%	1,449	53.51%	0	0.00%	-190	-7.02%	2,708
Otero	692	50.66%	518	37.92%	156	11.42%	174	12.74%	1,366
Quay	1,167	50.54%	816	35.34%	326	14.12%	351	15.20%	2,309
Rio Arriba	1,189	37.77%	1,941	61.66%	18	0.57%	-752	-23.89%	3,148
Roosevelt	837	61.91%	291	21.52%	224	16.57%	546	40.38%	1,352
San Juan	823	61.69%	433	32.46%	78	5.85%	390	29.24%	1,334
San Miguel	2,153	42.35%	2,919	57.42%	12	0.24%	-766	-15.07%	5,084
Sandoval	759	59.48%	517	40.52%	0	0.00%	242	18.97%	1,276
Santa Fe	1,418	45.12%	1,710	54.41%	15	0.48%	-292	-9.29%	3,143
Sierra	576	52.65%	516	47.17%	2	0.18%	60	5.48%	1,094
Socorro	1,414	40.40%	2,085	59.57%	1	0.03%	-671	-19.17%	3,500
Taos	1,013	43.95%	1,289	55.92%	3	0.13%	-276	-11.97%	2,305
Torrance	814	45.60%	883	49.47%	88	4.93%	-69	-3.87%	1,785
Union	1,379	49.13%	1,288	45.89%	140	4.99%	91	3.24%	2,807
Valencia	303	14.55%	1,775	85.25%	4	0.19%	-1,472	-70.70%	2,082
Total	31,036	51.01%	28,019	46.05%	1,787	2.94%	3,017	4.96%	60,842
