= Timeline of Santa Fe, New Mexico =

Coordinates: 35.4°N 106°W

The following is a timeline of the history of the city of Santa Fe, New Mexico, US.

== Pre-Revolt period ==
- 900 — Tewa people found a village (called Oghá P'o'oge in Tewa (Note: "white shell water place", one of a number of places named for their water access; also spelled Kuapooge, Apoga, Apoge, Cua P'Hoge, Cua-P'ho-o-ge, Cua-po-oge, Cua-Po-o-que, Kua-p'o-o-ge, Oga P'Hoge, Og-a-p'o-ge, Poga, Poge, Po-o-ge, etc.)) along the Santa Fe River, then navigable, and near the eventual siting of the Spanish plaza.
- 1200 — Coloradan Tewa migrate to the region as part of the Pueblo IV Era sociopolitical shifts. They found Ohkay Ówîngeh Pueblo 50 kilometres (31 mi) north of Oghá P'o'oge.
- 1598 — Juan de Oñate and son invade Ohkay Owingeh and rename it to San Juan de los Caballeros which is made the colonial capital for Santa Fe de Nuevo México, a newly-established province of New Spain.
- 1607 — Pedro de Peralta establishes a colonial settlement at Oghá P'o'oge, naming it after Francis of Assisi.
- 1609 - Villa Real de la Santa Fe de San Francisco founded.
- 1610
  - the new settlement becomes the provincial capital, headquartered at the Palace of the Governors.
  - San Miguel Mission is built.

== Post-Revolt period to Mexican Independence ==
- August 10, 1680 — The Pueblo Revolt, planned for some five years, begins the primary campaign.
- 1692 — The Reconquista retakes the Palace of the Governors.
- 1693 — Under orders of Diego de Vargas, 70 Revolt participants are executed on the Plaza.
- 1807 — Lt. Zebulon Pike and his party are held in Santa Fe under espionage charges while awaiting trial in Chihuahua after they are arrested in the San Luis Valley, entering it from the southwestern portion of the new Louisiana Purchase.
- 1810 — The Spanish viceroy headquartered at the Palace of the Governors attempts to quash the Mexican War of Independence.
- 1821 — William Becknell's project to establish a trading route reaches Santa Fe, after which the completed Santa Fe Trail is named.

== Mexican period ==
- 1824 — The 1824 Constitution of Mexico establishes Santa Fe as the capital of the Mexican territory Santa Fe de Nuevo México.
- 1836 — Texas claims all land in the territory east of the Rio Grande, including Santa Fe; the claim is never reified.
- September 1841 — The 320 members of the Texan Santa Fe Expedition fail to capture Santa Fe or any part of the territory.
- 1846 — General Stephen W. Kearny's army enters Santa Fe via the Santa Fe Trail without opposition.
- 1847 — The Santa Fe Republican is founded as New Mexico's first dual-language newspaper.

== US Territorial period ==
- September 9, 1850 — New Mexico is claimed by the United States government as a territory, of which Santa Fe is made the capital city by the following year.
- October 24, 1867 — The Soldiers' Monument is erected.
- 1890 - Santa Fe Indian School founded.
- 1891 — William Taylor Thornton is elected Mayor.
- 1892 — Manuel Valdes is elected Mayor.
- 1893 — Ralph E. Twitchell is elected Mayor.
- 1894 — J.H. Sloan is elected Mayor.
- 1895 — Charles F. Easley is elected Mayor.
- 1896 — Pedro Delgado is elected Mayor.
- 1897 — Charles A. Spiess is elected Mayor.
- 1898 — J.R. Hudson is elected Mayor.
- 1899 — J.H. Sloan is again elected Mayor.
- 1901 — Amado Chavez is elected Mayor.
- 1902 — I. Sparks is elected Mayor.
- 1904 — A.R. Gibson is elected Mayor.
- 1906 — Thomas B. Catron is elected Mayor.
- 1908 — Jose D. Sena is elected Mayor.
- 1910 — Arthur Seligman is elected Mayor.

== Statehood period ==
- January 6, 1912 — New Mexico becomes a state, and Santa Fe a state capitol.
- 1912 — Celso Lopez is elected Mayor.
- 1914 — William G. Sargent is elected Mayor.
- 1918 — Edward R. Davies is elected Mayor.
- 1920 — Thomas Z. Winter is elected Mayor.
- 1922 — Charles C. Closson is elected Mayor.
- 1924 — Nathan Jaffa is elected Mayor.
- 1926 — Edward Safford is elected Mayor.
- 1928 — James C. McConvery is elected Mayor.
- 1932 — David Chavez Jr. is elected Mayor.
- 1934 — Charles B. Barker is elected Mayor.
- 1936 — Frank Andrews is elected Mayor.
- 1938 — Alfredo Ortiz is elected Mayor.
- 1942 — Manuel Lujan Sr. is elected Mayor.
- 1948 — Frank S. Ortiz is elected Mayor.
- 1952 — Paul Huss is elected Mayor.
- 1956 — Leo Murphy is elected Mayor.
- 1962 — Pat Hollis is elected Mayor.
- 1968 — George A. Gonzales is elected Mayor.
- 1972 — Joseph E. Valdes is elected Mayor.
- 1976
  - La Montañita Co-op founded.
  - Samuel W. Pick is elected Mayor.
- 1978 — Arthur E. Trujillo is elected Mayor.
- 1982 — Louis R. Montano is elected Mayor.
- 1984 — Santa Fe Institute established.
- 1986
  - Santa Fe Jail becomes a private prison.
  - Samuel W. Pick is again elected Mayor.
- 1994 — Debbie Jaramillo is elected Mayor.
- 1998 — Larry A. Delgado is elected Mayor.
- 2006 — David Coss is elected Mayor.
- 2010 — Population: 67,947.
- 2014 — Javier M. Gonzales is elected Mayor.
- 2018 — Alan Webber is elected Mayor.
- October 13, 2020
  - The Soldiers' Monument is toppled.
  - Population: 87,505.
- 2025 — Michael Garcia is elected Mayor.

== See also ==
- Santa Fe, New Mexico § History
- List of mayors of Santa Fe
- National Register of Historic Places listings in Santa Fe County, New Mexico
- Outline of New Mexico
- Timeline of New Mexico history
  - Timeline of Albuquerque, New Mexico
  - Timeline of Santa Fe, New Mexico

== Bibliography ==
Published in the 20th century

- "Santa Fe", New Mexico state business directory...1905-1906, Denver: Gazetter Pub. Co. – via HathiTrust
- Rob Rachowiecki (1995), "New Mexico: Santa Fe & Taos", Southwest, Lonely Planet, OL 24220208M

Published in the 21st century

- Leach, Nicky (November 24, 2009). Insiders' Guide to Santa Fe (5th ed.). Lanham, MD: Rowman & Littlefield. p. 122. ISBN 978-0-7627-5346-8.
