= Santa Fe High School (New Mexico) =

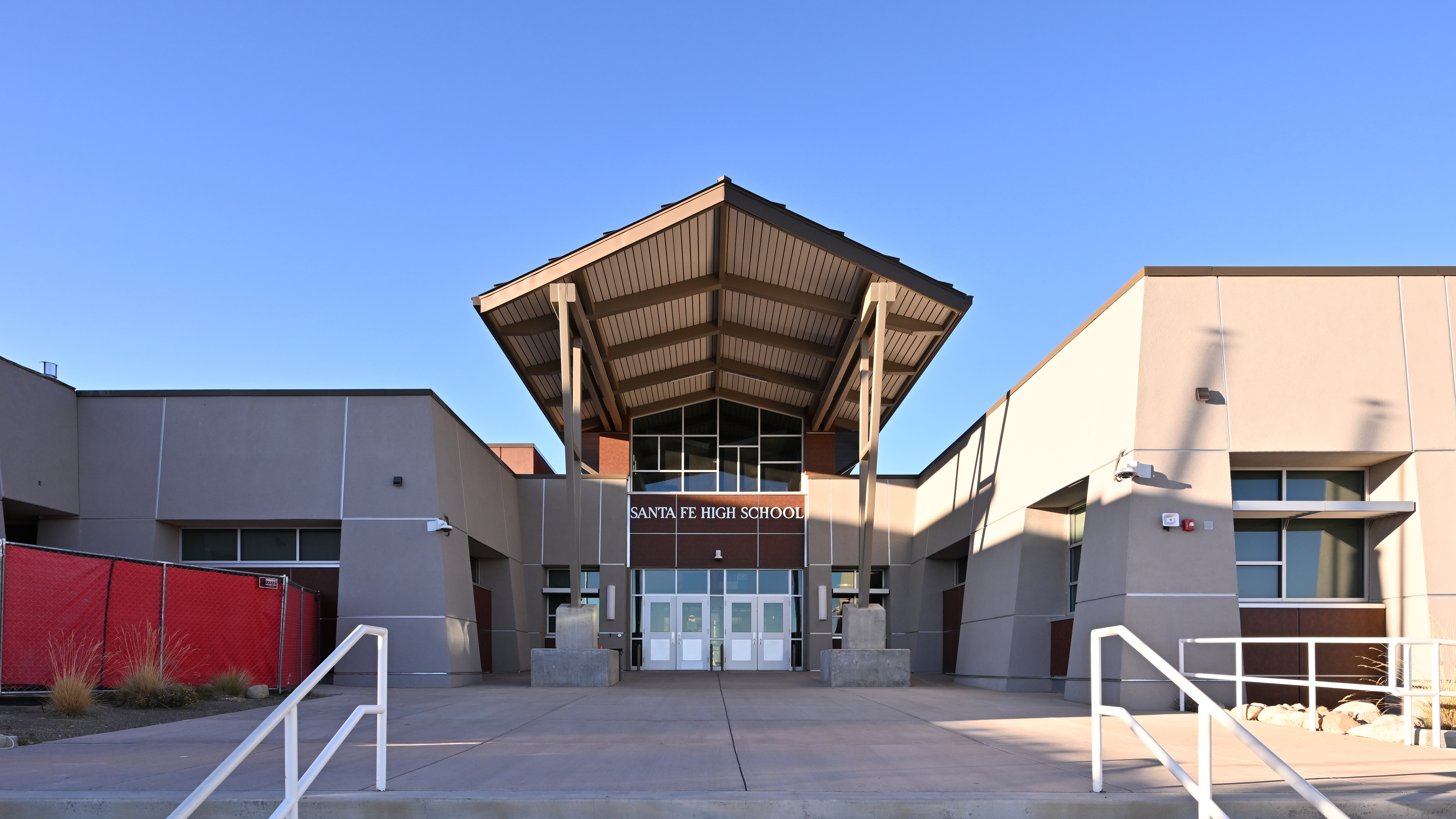

Location
- 2100 Yucca Street; Santa Fe, New Mexico 87505; United States; 35°39′03″N 105°58′17″W

Information
- Type: Public
- Established: 1899
- School district: Santa Fe Public Schools
- Principal: Jaime Chavez
- Teaching staff: 87.93 (FTE)
- Grades: 9-12
- Enrollment: 1,599 (2023–2024)
- Student to teacher ratio: 18.18
- Color: Navy blue Vegas gold
- Nickname: Demons
- Rivals: St. Michael's High School; Capital High School
- Yearbook: Para Mañana
- Website: sfhs.sfps.info

Santa Fe High School is a public secondary school located in Santa Fe, New Mexico, United States. Founded in 1899, it is one of the oldest high schools in New Mexico. The school exclusively educates a secondary student-based body, ninth through twelfth grades.

Known for its Advanced Placement (AP) program, the school's test scores regularly outperform state, national, and global averages. The participation rate among students for AP examinations is 42% as of the 2017 academic year.

Notable graduates include Zach Condon, creator and leading member of the indie folk band Beirut, and the youngest-ever mayor of Santa Fe, George Abrán Gonzales, who is also the father of the former mayor, Javier Gonzales.

== History ==
Santa Fe High School was established in 1899 by the merchant, politician, and Governor Miguel Antonio Otero. It is the oldest of the three Santa Fe public high schools. The school was originally located downtown, one block from the Plaza in the space where City Hall and the Convention Center currently sit. The new location on a hilltop above Yucca and Siringo roads was built and opened in 1966 where students slowly transitioned until the downtown campus was officially closed in 1977.

Following principal Carl Marano's promotion in 2021, the district announced Renee Salazar-Garcia as Marano's replacement. Salazar-Garcia assumed office in July 2021. Salazar-Garcia resigned in November 2022 to "pursue new career opportunities". Superintendent Hilario Chavez named former assistant principal David Vincent as interim principal. Vincent was later appointed the permanent principal of the school, and assumed office in early December 2022. Vincent abruptly resigned in January 2024, and was replaced by Interim Jakob Lain. The District called Lain out of retirement to replace Vincent, whose resignation came as a shock to many. Although Lain came out of retirement and took office in late January, he was only a temporary replacement. In March 2024, the district announced the incumbent assistant principal Jaime Chavez will take office as directing principal starting off the 2024-2025 school year in August.

== Academics ==
The school is a part of U.S. Department of Education's Green Ribbon Program and Sustainable Santa Fe. Santa Fe High has installed numerous solar panels that partially supply the energy of the campus.

In relation to its Advanced Placement (AP) program, Santa Fe High School's test scores regularly outperform state, national, and global averages. The participation rate among students for AP examinations is 42% as of the 2017 academic year.

Santa Fe High features a student-run media organization known as "The Demon Tattler". The Tattler has served as the school's official newspaper for over 60 years, but as of 2015, it has transitioned into an online-only entity. Students who enroll in the dedicated Journalism class serve as reporters for the Demon Tattler Website. Journalism students are also responsible for the publishing of daily school news videos to the Demon Tattler YouTube channel. As of 2023, Barbara Gerber serves as the head of the Journalism department of the Demon Tattler, while John Morrison leads the Video Production Department.

== Athletics ==
Santa Fe High School is a participating school in NM District 2-AAAAAA of the New Mexico Activities Association (NMAA). The school has won over 28 state championships from NMAA-sanctioned sports and events. The SFHS tennis teams (coached by math teacher Ramon Martinez) in the 1980s were particularly successful, being undefeated in dual matches (88–0) between 1979 and 1983. Another of the school's most dominant programs was its cross country team in the late 1970s and early '80s under coach John Alire, winning twelve state title trophies during this span.

St Michael's High School is a traditional sporting rival, dating back more than 100 years.

=== State championships ===
New Mexico State Champions
Varsity sport	Year:
Cross country, boys' (Class AAAA)	1974, 1975, 1976, 1978, 1979, 1980
Cross country, girls' (Class AAAA)	1979, 1980, 1983, 1984, 1985, 1986
Volleyball (Class AAAA)	1978, 1983, 1994
Soccer, boys'	2021 (22–1, Class 5A)
Football	1979 (13–1, Class AAAA)
Basketball, boys'	1978 (28–2, Class AAAA)
Basketball, girls'	1988 (20-6, Class AAAA), 2014 (30–2, Class AAAA)
Baseball	1977 (Class AAAA)
Tennis, girls'	1978, 1979, 1994, 1995, 1997 (tie) (Class AAAA)
Tennis, boys'	1982, 1983 (Class AAAA)
Golf, boys'	1976 (Class AAAA)
Golf, girls'	1985 (Class AAAA)
Track & field, boys'	1992 Runner-Up (Class AAAA)
Track & field, girls'	2014 Runner-Up (Class AAAA)

== Notable alumni ==
- Aviva Baumann, actress
- Dana Tai Soon Burgess, dancer, leading Asian-American choreographer
- Fabian Chavez Jr., member of the New Mexico Senate
- Zach Condon, creator and leading member of the indie folk band Beirut
- David Coss, Mayor of Santa Fe
- Michael Garcia, Mayor of Santa Fe
- Carla Garrett, weightlifter and discus thrower that has represented the United States in international competitions
- George Abrán Gonzales, Mayor of Santa Fe (1968–1972); Santa Fe High School Senior class president
- Javier Gonzales, Mayor of Santa Fe (2014–2018)
- David Iglesias, United States Attorney for the District of New Mexico
- Fred Kabotie, Hopi painter, silversmith, illustrator, potter, author, curator and educator
- Sabrina Lozada-Cabbage, Olympic basketball player for Puerto Rico
- Fran Maier, co-founder of Match.com
- Patricia Michaels, fashion designer
- sj Miller, education professor
- Seth D. Montgomery, justice of the New Mexico Supreme Court
- Leroy Petry, the second living person to receive the United States Armed Forces' highest decoration for valor, the Medal of Honor, for actions that occurred since the Vietnam War
- Stan Quintana, football quarterback
