= Leroy Petry =

United States Army Medal of Honor recipient (born 1979)

Leroy Arthur Petry
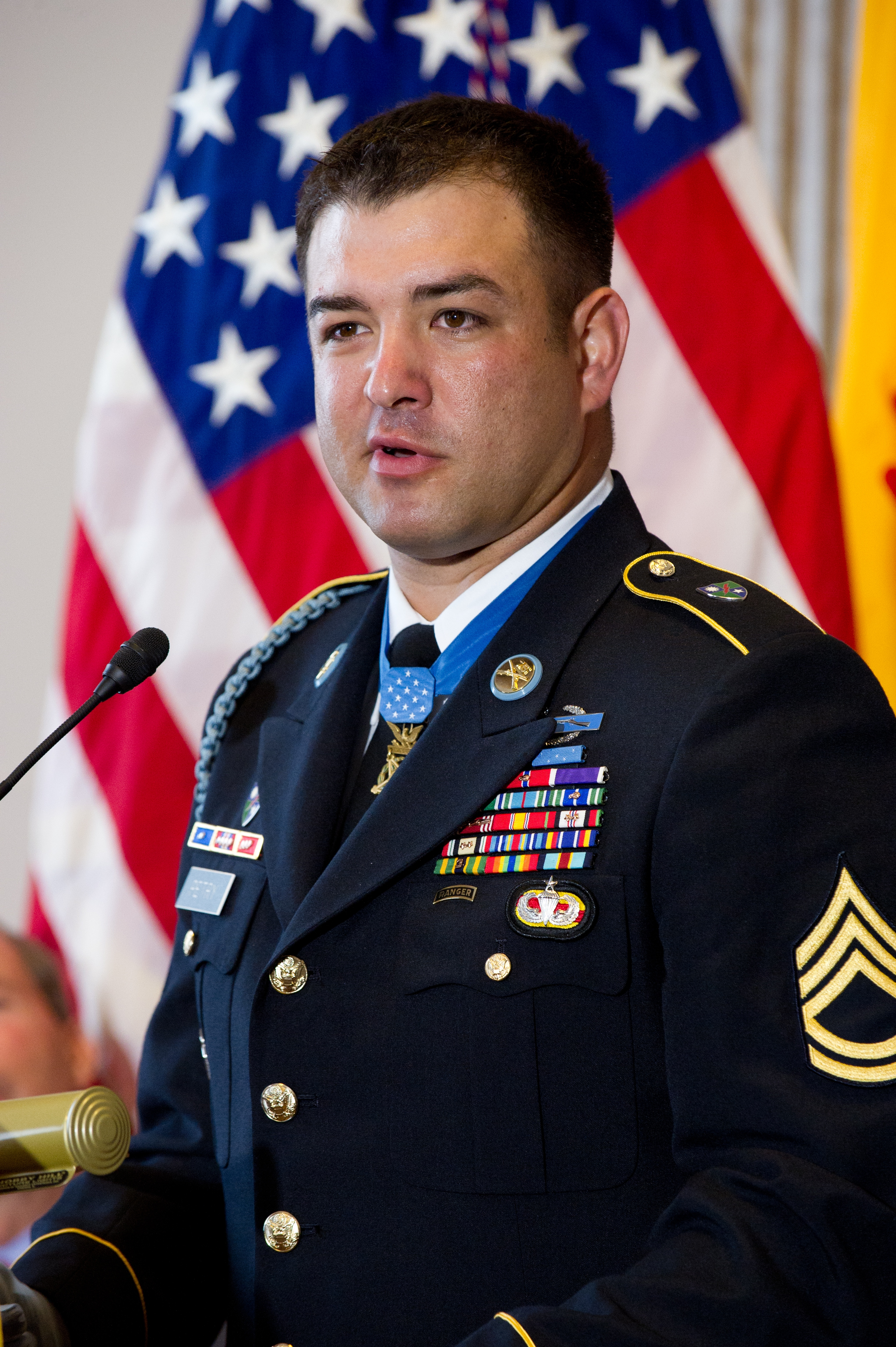
- Petry in 2011
- Born: July 29, 1979 (age 47); Santa Fe, New Mexico, United States
- Military career
- Allegiance: United States
- Branch: United States Army
- Service years: 1999–2014
- Rank: Master Sergeant
- Units: Company D, 2nd Battalion, 75th Ranger Regiment
- Conflicts: Iraq War; War in Afghanistan (WIA)
- Awards: Medal of Honor; Legion of Merit; Bronze Star Medal (2); Purple Heart

Leroy Arthur Petry (born July 29, 1979) is a retired United States Army soldier. He received the U.S. military's highest decoration, the Medal of Honor, for his actions in Afghanistan in 2008 during Operation Enduring Freedom.

Born in Santa Fe, New Mexico, Petry had an active youth, and joined the Army after high school. Completing the Ranger Indoctrination Program, he was deployed several times to both Iraq and Afghanistan as a member of the 2nd Battalion, 75th Ranger Regiment. On May 26, 2008, during his seventh deployment, Petry was a member of a team on a mission to capture a Taliban target in Paktia Province. Despite being wounded in both legs by gunfire, Petry continued to fight and give orders. When a grenade landed between him and two other soldiers, Petry grabbed it and attempted to throw it away from them. He saved the soldiers' lives but the grenade exploded, severing his right hand.

Petry became the second recent living recipient of the medal for the war in Afghanistan in 2011 when he received the award from U.S. President Barack Obama. Opting to reenlist in spite of his injury, Petry remained on active duty in the U.S. Army until his retirement on July 29, 2014.

== Early life and education ==
Leroy Petry was born on July 29, 1979, in Santa Fe, New Mexico, to Larry and Lorella (Tapia) Petry, of Mexican-American descent. He is the third of five sons, with older brothers Larry Armando and Lloyd, and younger brothers Lyndon and Lincoln. In his youth, he was described as very active and likable by his friends and family. Petry attended Santa Fe High School but was a poor student; he repeated his freshman year. As a sophomore, he transferred to St. Catherine Indian School, a private school in Santa Fe, where his academic performance substantially improved. Growing up, Petry played football and basketball, and he also enjoyed fixing cars and cooking in his spare time. He graduated in 1998; his was the last class to graduate from St. Catherine before it closed.

Petry spent the next year studying at New Mexico Highlands University in Las Vegas, New Mexico. He also worked at the vehicle maintenance department of Pecos Public Transportation with his father and grandfather, and made signs at a local business, Al's Signs.

== Military career ==
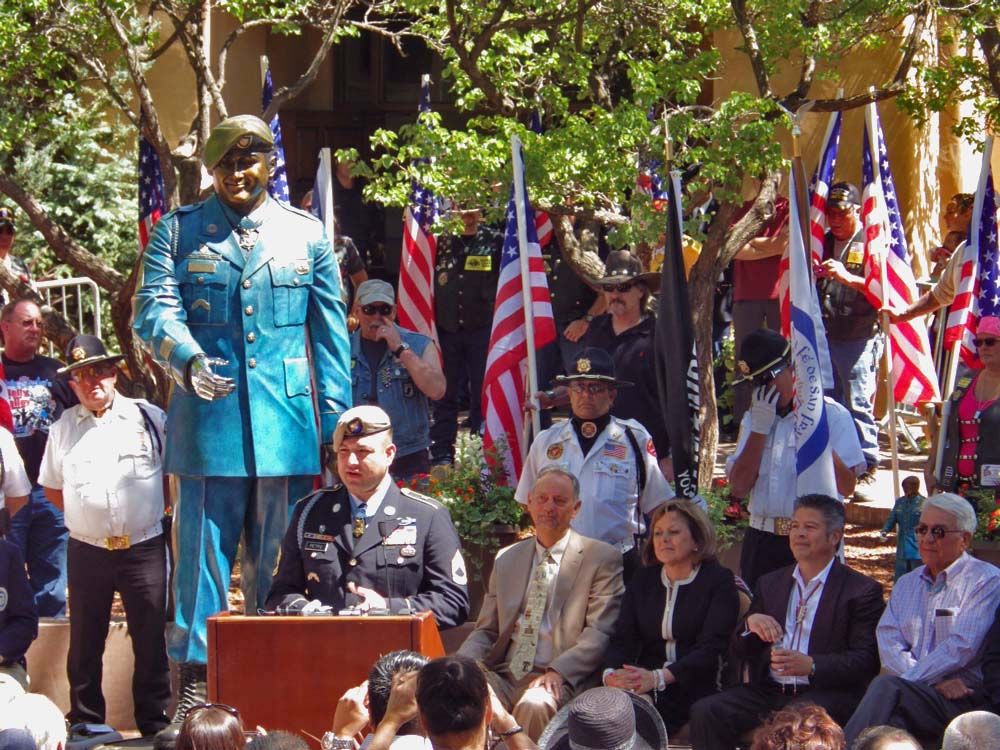
Petry – seated to his left, Santa Fe mayor David Coss, New Mexico Governor Susana Martinez, and sculptor and governor of Pojoaque Pueblo, George Rivera.

Influenced by a cousin who joined the United States Army Rangers, Petry enlisted in the Army in Santa Fe in September 1999. He also became a Ranger. He attended Basic Combat Training and Advanced Individual Training at Fort Benning, Georgia. At the time of the September 11th attacks, he was training to become a Ranger.

Upon completion of his training, Petry was assigned to 2nd Battalion, 75th Ranger Regiment based at Joint Base Lewis-McChord, in Washington state. Petry had a total of eight deployments: two supporting Operation Iraqi Freedom and six supporting Operation Enduring Freedom. In all, Petry spent a total of 28 months deployed. During his time in Iraq and Afghanistan, Petry served in a number of positions, including as a grenadier, squad automatic rifleman, fireteam leader, squad leader, operations sergeant, and a weapons squad leader.

=== Medal of Honor action ===
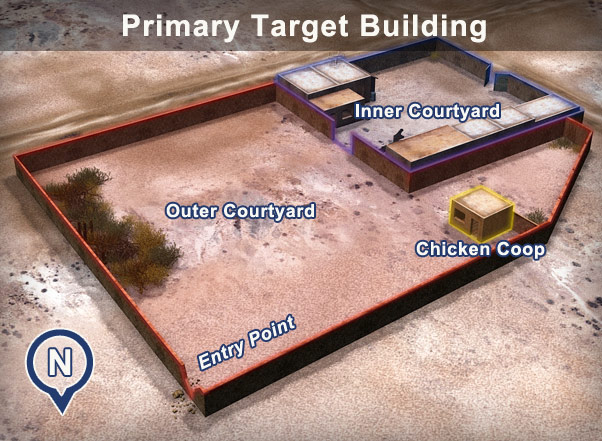
Map of the target building and surrounding area.

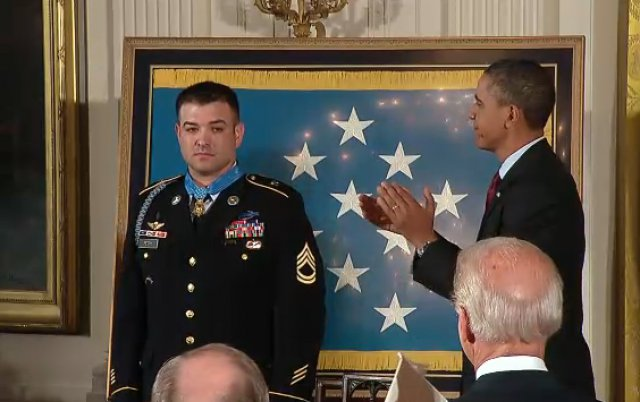
Petry after receiving the Medal of Honor at the White House in 2011.

On May 26, 2008, Staff Sergeant Petry and his unit were on a mission in Paktia Province, Afghanistan. He was assigned to D Company, 2nd Battalion, 75th Ranger Regiment, which was on a daylight raid to capture a high-value target from the Taliban. Petry was to locate with the platoon headquarters in the target building once it was secured. Once there, he was to serve as the senior non-commissioned officer at the site for the remainder of the operation. The team of 7 Rangers encountered about 40 Taliban, 12 of them armed. Almost immediately after getting out of the helicopters that delivered the unit to the attack site, the Rangers came under strong fire. Petry provided additional supervision to an assaulting squad during the clearance of a building, and afterward he took Private First Class Lucas Robinson to clear an outer courtyard.

Three Taliban fighters were in the courtyard, which had a chicken coop within it. The Taliban fired on Petry and Robinson; Petry was wounded by one round that went through both his legs, and Robinson was wounded, being hit on the armor plate protecting his side. Petry led Robinson to the cover of the chicken coop, and reported the contact and their wounded condition. Petry threw a thermobaric grenade from cover. At the chicken coop, the two men were joined by Sergeant Daniel Higgins, who assessed the wounds of the two soldiers.

A Taliban fighter threw a grenade at their position which landed 10 meters from them; it detonated, and the blast knocked the three soldiers to the ground, wounding Higgins, and further wounding Robinson. Shortly thereafter the three were joined by Staff Sergeant James Roberts and Specialist Christopher Gathercole. A Taliban fighter threw another grenade, which landed a few feet from Higgins and Robinson. Knowing the risk, Petry picked up and attempted to throw the grenade in the direction of the Taliban. Petry later recalled his immediate reaction was

get it out of here, get it away from the guys and myself. And I reached over, leaned over to the right, grabbed it with my hand, and I threw it as hard as I could, what I thought was at the time. And as soon as I opened my hand to let it go, it just exploded instantly. And I came back, and the hand was completely severed off.

The detonation amputated his right hand, and sprayed his body with shrapnel. Petry likely saved the two other soldiers from serious injury or death.

Petry placed a tourniquet on his right arm. Roberts began to fire at the Taliban fighters, suppressing them in the courtyard. An additional fighter on the east end of the courtyard fired, fatally wounding Gathercole. Higgins and Robinson returned fire, killing that fighter. They were joined by Sergeant First Class Jerod Staidle, the platoon sergeant, and Specialist Gary Depriest, a medic. Directing the medic to treat Gathercole, Petry was assisted by Staide and Higgins to the casualty collection point.

=== Return to service ===
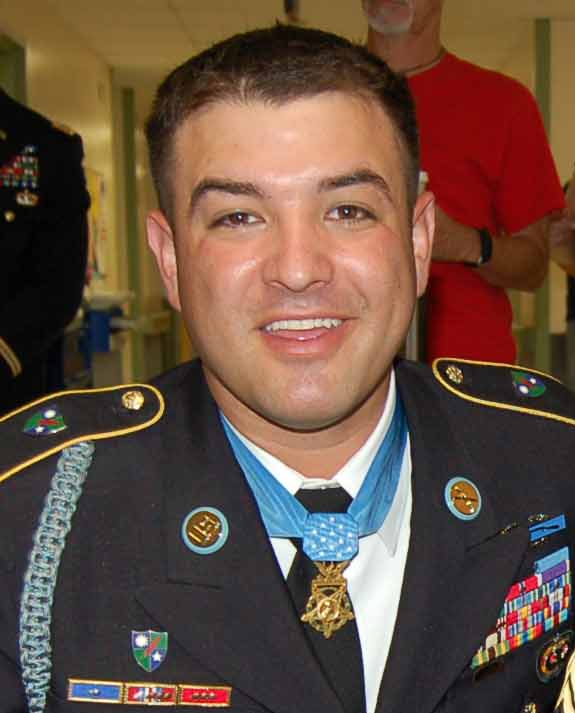
Leroy Petry visits a veterans hospital in 2011

Petry's wounds resulted in his right arm having to be amputated below the elbow. He was evacuated to an American hospital in Germany, where he spent several weeks in recovery before being transferred to Carl R. Darnall Army Medical Center in Fort Hood, Texas. He now uses an advanced prosthetic in place of his right hand. On the prosthetic is a small plaque listing the names of the fallen Rangers of his regiment. After recovering, Petry did not seek a medical discharge; instead, he deployed to Afghanistan between recovering and receiving the Medal of Honor. He was later promoted to the rank of sergeant first class.

Petry received the Medal of Honor from U.S. President Barack Obama on July 12, 2011, in a ceremony at the White House. He is the second living recipient of the medal, after Army Staff Sergeant Salvatore Giunta, for actions occurring after the Vietnam War. He is the ninth recipient for actions in Iraq or Afghanistan. Giunta was in attendance at the awarding ceremony. Petry later in 2011 attended the Medal of Honor ceremony of U.S. Marine Sergeant Dakota Meyer, the third living recipient of the medal since Vietnam.

=== Re-enlistment ===
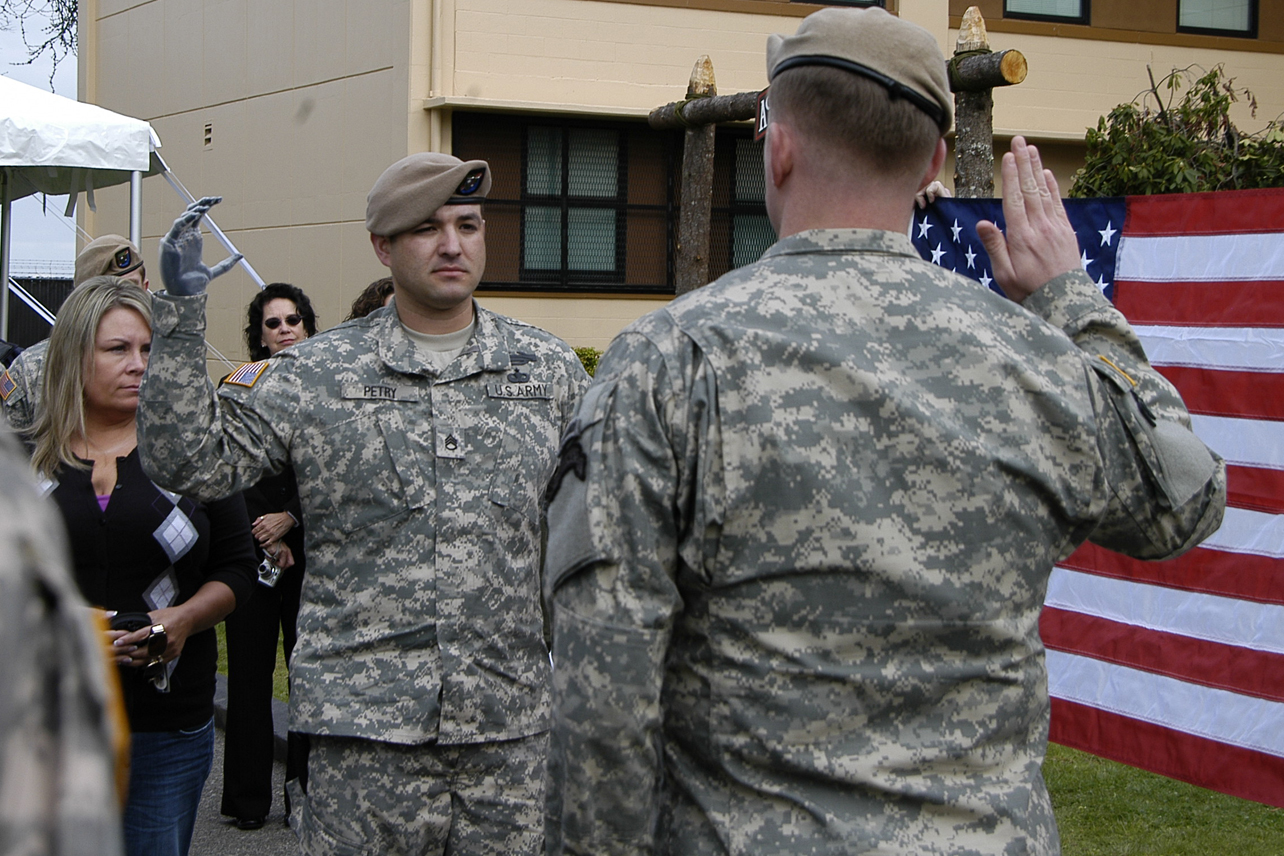
Petry re-enlists in the U.S. Army at Fort Lewis, Washington, in May 2010.

Following this award, Petry was asked to appear on talk shows and at other gatherings, starting with Good Morning America. In his spare time, he stayed physically active. He has learned to golf, hunt, water ski, and drive all terrain vehicles with use of his prosthetic hand.

In 2010, Petry re-enlisted in the U.S. Army for an indefinite term of service. He was stationed at Joint Base Lewis-McChord, Washington, where he served as a liaison officer for United States Special Operations Command's Care Coalition Northwest Region. He assisted ill and injured Rangers as well as their families. In 2011, Petry also began attending Pierce College, pursuing a Bachelor of Science degree in business management.

Although he had wanted to complete 20 years of active duty service, due to medical and "psychological issues", Petry decided to seek medical retirement. In June 2014, Petry was given a house by George Strait on behalf of a charity, in the Dallas–Fort Worth metroplex. On July 23, 2014, Petry was promoted to Master Sergeant and was awarded the Legion of Merit during his retirement ceremony. He was inducted into the Honorable Order of Saint Maurice. He officially retired from the United States Army on July 29, 2014, after nearly 15 years of service.

== Post-military activities ==
Before he retired, Petry stated his intention to spend more time with family, and to further his education. On Veterans Day 2014, Petry was featured on The Concert for Valor. In January 2015, Master Sergeant Jose Rodela and Petry attended the All-American Bowl in San Antonio. In April 2015, Corporal Kyle Carpenter, and Petry, returned to Afghanistan where both addressed deployed service members. As part of paying tribute to Missing in Action/Prisoners of War, Petry completed a 10-day cross country Run For The Wall in May 2015. In 2015 and 2016, fellow Medal of Honor recipients Meyer, and Clint Romesha, and Petry became involved in the movie Range 15. In 2017, Petry was inducted into the Ranger Hall of Fame at Fort Benning. During the 2016 United States presidential election, Petry endorsed the candidacy of Jeb Bush, then Donald Trump. Working with non-profit organisations, Petry has escorted wounded veterans to return to Afghanistan, for Operation Proper Exit, more than a dozen times. Along with fellow Medal of Honor recipient Florent Groberg, Petry works for a consulting company, Mission 6 Zero.

Petry has become an advocate for behavioral medicine. In addition to all these activities, Petry has become a prolific speaker; he has spoken at the College of William & Mary, University of South Florida, Minneapolis, Kabul, Fairbanks, Virginia Tech, and Montana State University.

In a February 2020 guest appearance on Fox and Friends, Petry stated, that lieutenant colonel Alexander Vindman "couldn't be trusted" during Ranger School, and also stated that Vindman's peers took measures toward an attempt to have him removed from training. Petry went on to accuse Vindman of "spotlighting", a term used to describe casting of oneself in an exceptionally positive light by highlighting oneself as a hero.

== Awards and decorations ==
MSG Petry has received the following awards:

| Right breast | | Left breast | | |
|---|---|---|---|---|
| | | Width-44 crimson ribbon with a pair of width-2 white stripes on the edges | | |
| 75th Ranger Regiment Distinctive Unit Insignia | | Combat Infantryman Badge | | |
| 75th Ranger Regiment Distinctive Unit Insignia | | Medal of Honor | Legion of Merit | |
| Joint Meritorious Unit Award | Valorous Unit Award | Bronze Star Medal w/ one bronze oak leaf cluster | Purple Heart | Army Commendation Medal w/ two bronze oak leaf clusters |
| | | Joint Service Achievement Medal | Army Achievement Medal w/ one bronze oak leaf cluster | Army Good Conduct Medal w/ four bronze loops |
| | | National Defense Service Medal | Afghanistan Campaign Medal w/ three service stars | Iraq Campaign Medal w/ three campaign stars |
| | | Global War on Terrorism Expeditionary Medal | Global War on Terrorism Service Medal | NCO Professional Development Ribbon w/ award numeral 3 |
| | | Army Service Ribbon | Army Overseas Service Ribbon w/ award numeral 4 | NATO Medal for ex-Yugoslavia |
| 2nd Battalion, 75th Ranger Regiment Combat Service Identification Badge | | Ranger Tab | Senior Parachutist Badge | Expert Marksmanship Badge w/ rifle bar |

| Expert Infantryman Badge |
| Canadian Jump Wings (non-operational) |
| 4 Overseas Service Bars |
| 4 Service stripes |

=== Medal of Honor citation ===
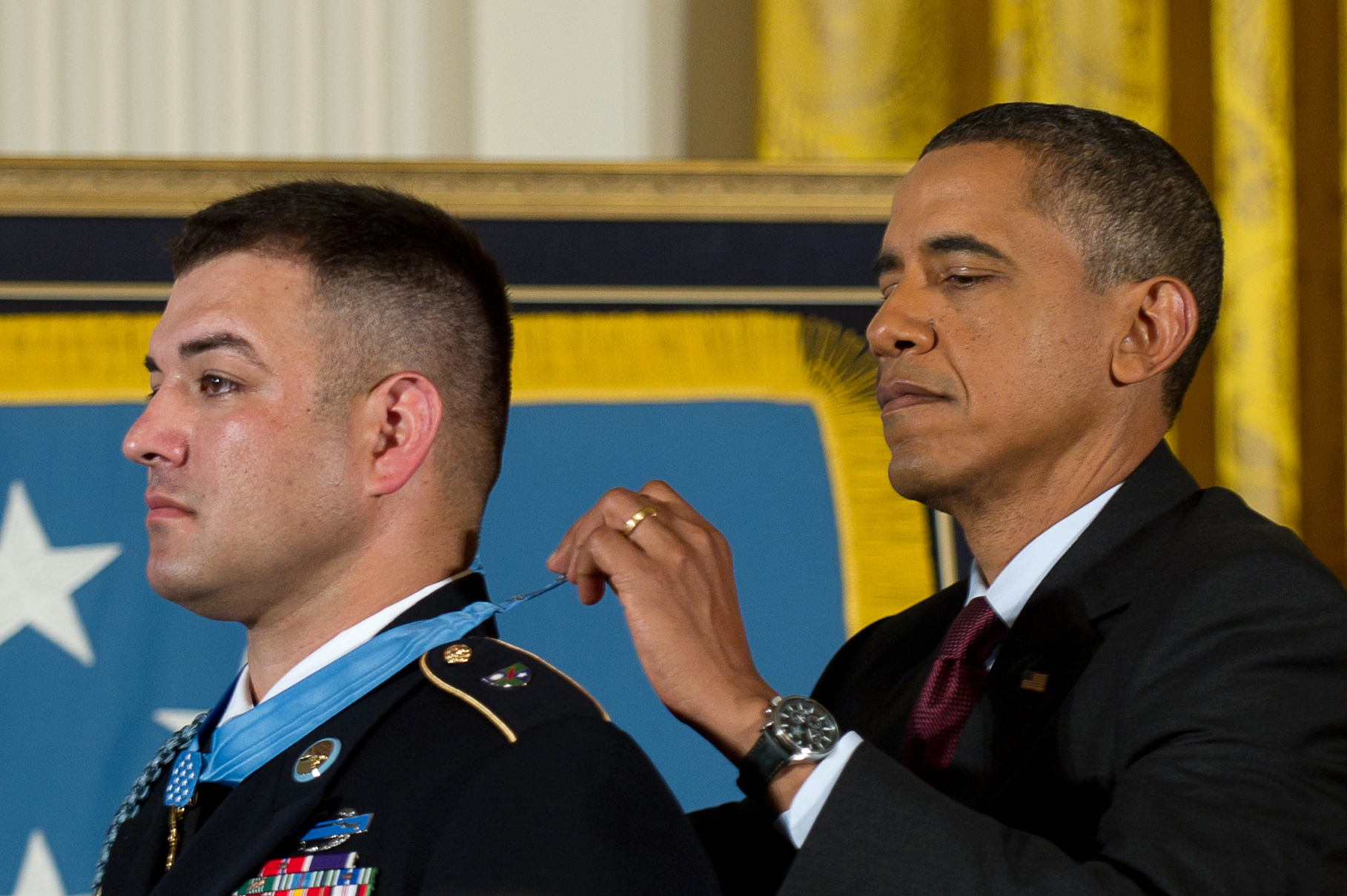
Petry receives the Medal of Honor from President Barack Obama

For conspicuous gallantry and intrepidity at the risk of his life above and beyond the call of duty:

Staff Sergeant Leroy A. Petry distinguished himself by acts of gallantry and intrepidity at the risk of his life above and beyond the call of duty in action with an armed enemy in the vicinity of Paktya Province, Afghanistan, on May 26, 2008. As a Weapons Squad Leader with D Company, 2nd Battalion, 75th Ranger Regiment, Staff Sergeant Petry moved to clear the courtyard of a house that potentially contained high-value combatants. While crossing the courtyard, Staff Sergeant Petry and another Ranger were engaged and wounded by automatic weapons fire from enemy fighters. Still under enemy fire, and wounded in both legs, Staff Sergeant Petry led the other Ranger to cover. He then reported the situation and engaged the enemy with a hand grenade, providing suppression as another Ranger moved to his position. The enemy quickly responded by maneuvering closer and throwing grenades. The first grenade explosion knocked his two fellow Rangers to the ground and wounded both with shrapnel. A second grenade then landed only a few feet away from them. Instantly realizing the danger, Staff Sergeant Petry, unhesitatingly and with complete disregard for his safety, deliberately and selflessly moved forward, picked up the grenade, and in an effort to clear the immediate threat, threw the grenade away from his fellow Rangers. As he was releasing the grenade it detonated, amputating his right hand at the wrist and further injuring him with multiple shrapnel wounds. Although picking up and throwing the live grenade grievously wounded Staff Sergeant Petry, his gallant act undeniably saved his fellow Rangers from being severely wounded or killed. Despite the severity of his wounds, Staff Sergeant Petry continued to maintain the presence of mind to place a tourniquet on his right wrist before communicating the situation by radio in order to coordinate support for himself and his fellow wounded Rangers. Staff Sergeant Petry's extraordinary heroism and devotion to duty are in keeping with the highest traditions of military service, and reflect great credit upon himself, 75th Ranger Regiment, and the United States Army.

== Personal life ==
Petry and his wife Ashley have four children: son Landon as well as three children from Ashley's previous relationship. As of December 2015, Petry resides in Steilacoom, Washington.

== Honors ==
- On June 24, 2013, a 9-foot tall bronze and stainless steel statue of Petry by George Rivera, Governor of Pueblo of Pojoaque, was unveiled at Santa Fe City Hall. Among the visiting dignitaries was Medal of Honor recipient Bruce Crandall.
- In 2013, a housing program was named after Petry in the Washington metropolitan area, funded by David Feherty's Troops First Foundation
- The city of Santa Fe announced that the South Meadows Bridge over the Santa Fe River will be rededicated as the "Sgt. First Class Leroy Arthur Petry Bridge."
- In 2018, a unit for care of veterans in a psychiatric hospital in Marysville, Washington, was dedicated on behalf of Petry.

== See also ==
- Ty Carter
- William D. Swenson
- Kyle J. White
- Ryan M. Pitts
- List of Hispanic Medal of Honor recipients
- List of Afghanistan Medal of Honor recipients
- Recipients of the Legion of Merit
