= 2025 Santa Fe mayoral election =

Local election in Santa Fe, New Mexico

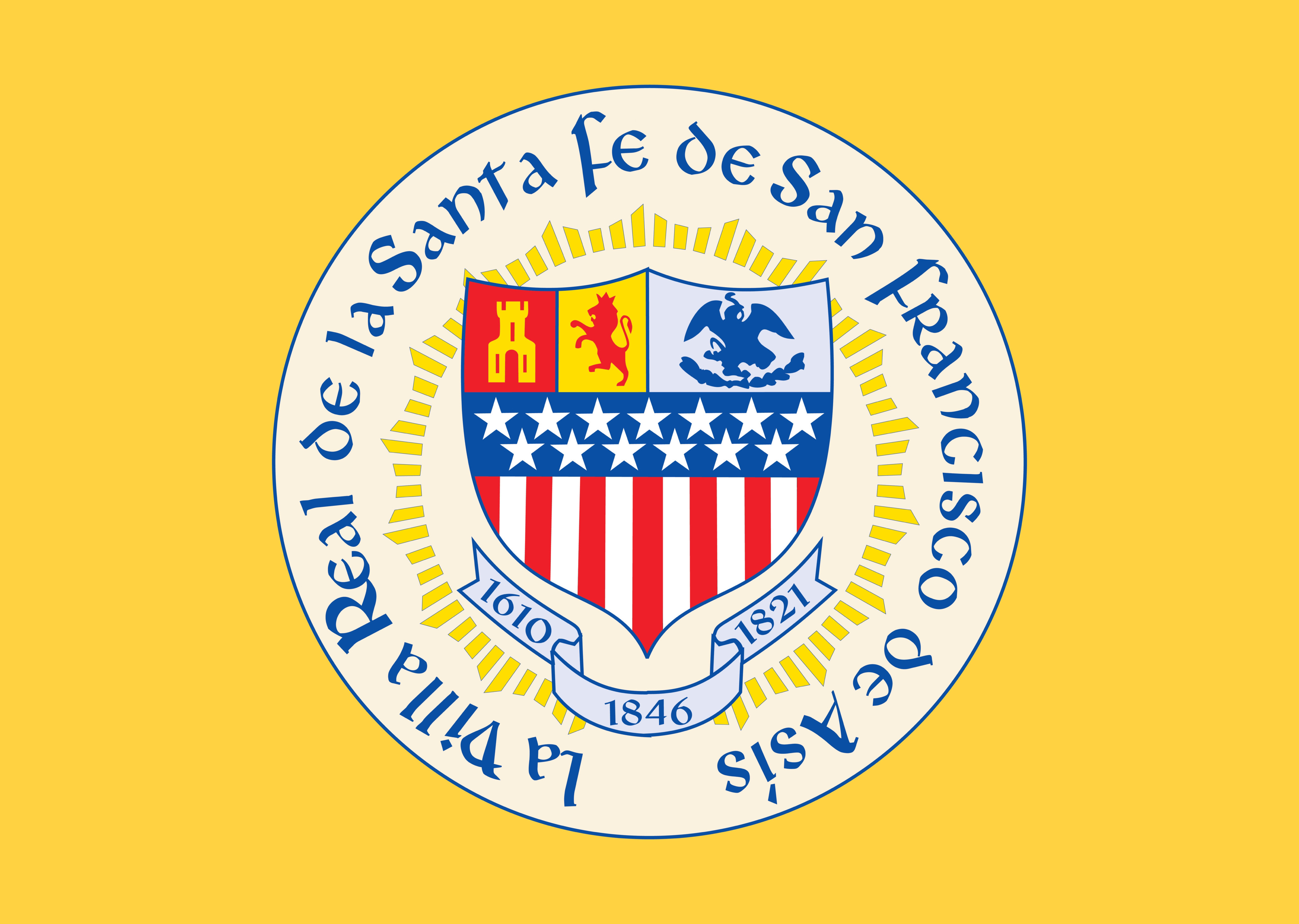
- November 4, 2025
Candidate	Michael Garcia	Oscar Salazar Rodriguez	Ronald Trujillo
First round	8,838; 35.97%	5,536; 22.53%	3,426; 13.94%
Final round	13,400; 62.77%	7,947; 37.23%	Eliminated
Candidate	Justin Greene	JoAnne Vigil Coppler	Tarin Nix
First round	2,452; 9.98%	1,921; 7.82%	1,558; 6.34%
Final round	Eliminated	Eliminated	Eliminated
Mayor before election
Alan Webber
Elected mayor
Michael Garcia

The 2025 Santa Fe mayoral election was held on Tuesday, November 4, 2025. Incumbent mayor Alan Webber did not run for re-election. Santa Fe has used instant runoff ranked-choice voting in its mayoral elections since 2018. Michael J. Garcia won with 13,400 votes (62.77%) after seven rounds of runoffs, having received 8,838 (35.97%) in the first round. He took office January 1, 2026.

== Candidates ==
=== Declared ===
- Michael Garcia, Santa Fe city councilor
- Justin Greene, Santa Fe County Commissioner (District 1)
- Letitia Montoya
- Tarin Nix, political consultant
- Jeanne O'Dean
- Oscar Salazar Rodriguez, chief financial officer of the New Mexico Finance Authority
- Ron Trujillo, former Santa Fe city councilor
- JoAnne Vigil Coppler, real estate broker

=== Declined ===
- Alan Webber, incumbent mayor

== Endorsements ==
JoAnne Vigil Coppler (D)

Statewide officials

- Michelle Lujan Grisham, 32nd governor of New Mexico (2019–present)

== Results ==
2025 Santa Fe mayoral election
Candidate	Round 1		Round 2		Round 3		Round 4		Round 5		Round 6		Round 7	
Candidate	Votes	%	Votes	%	Votes	%	Votes	%	Votes	%	Votes	%	Votes	%
Michael Garcia	8,838	35.97	8,852	36.06	8,999	36.83	9,451	38.93	10,124	42.79	11,367	49.42	13,400	62.77
Oscar Salazar Rodriguez	5,536	22.53	5,553	22.62	5,633	23.05	6,109	25.16	6,349	26.84	7,210	31.35	7,947	37.23
Ronald Trujillo	3,426	13.94	3,435	13.99	3,533	14.46	3,637	14.98	4,059	17.16	4,423	19.23	Eliminated	
Justin Greene	2,452	9.98	2,471	10.07	2,546	10.42	2,809	11.57	3,126	13.21	Eliminated			
JoAnne Vigil Coppler	1,921	7.82	1,936	7.89	2,060	8.43	2,271	9.35	Eliminated					
Tarin Nix	1,558	6.34	1,579	6.43	1,663	6.81	Eliminated							
Letitia Montoya	713	2.90	723	2.95	Eliminated									
Jeanne O'Dean	126	0.51	Eliminated											
Total	24,570	100.0%	24,549	100.0%	24,434	100.0%	24,277	100.0%	23,658	100.0%	23,000	100.0%	21,347	100.0%
Non-transferable ballots	160		181		296		453		1,072		1,730		3,383	
