= KMIK =

KMIK may refer to:

- KMIK-LD, a defunct low-power television station (channel 21) formerly licensed to serve Cedar Falls, Iowa, United States
- KQFN, a radio station (1580 AM) licensed to serve Tempe, Arizona, United States, which held the call sign KMIK from 1998 to 2015
- KSWV, a radio station (810 AM) licensed to serve Santa Fe, New Mexico, United States, which held the call sign KMIK from 1987 to 1991
