= Ralph E. Twitchell =

American attorney, politician and writer (1859–1925)

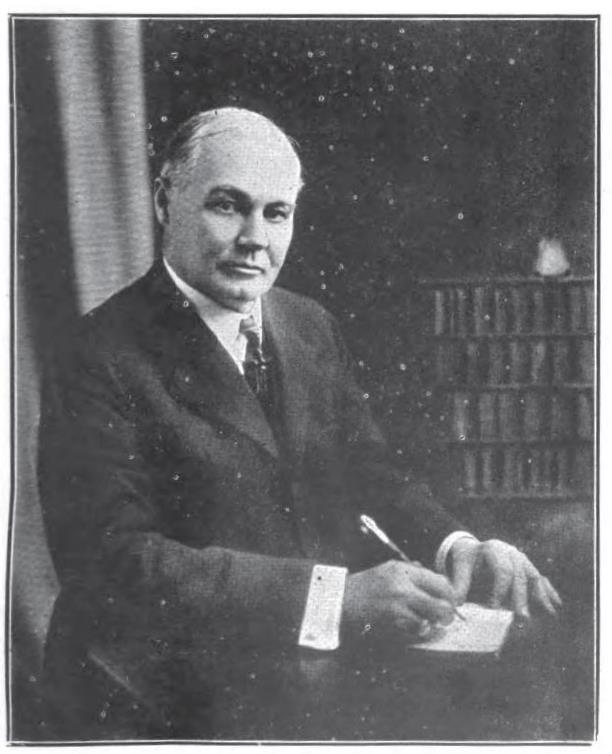

3rd Mayor of Santa Fe
- In office 1893–1894
- Preceded by: Manuel Valdez
- Succeeded by: J.H. Sloan

Personal details
- Born: November 29, 1859; Ann Arbor, Michigan, U.S.
- Died: August 26, 1925; Los Angeles, California, U.S.
- Political party: Republican
- Spouse(s): Margaret Olivia Collins; Estelle Bennett Burton
- Education: University of Kansas (BA); University of Michigan (LLB)
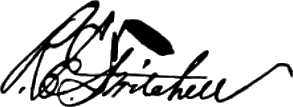
- Signature

Ralph Emerson Twitchell (1859–1925) was an American attorney, historian, and politician who served as the mayor of Santa Fe, New Mexico and chairman of the Rio Grande Commission, which drafted a treaty between the United States and Mexico leading to the building of the Elephant Butte Dam. Twitchell helped organize the first National Irrigation Congress in 1891. He is credited with rescuing the Spanish Archives from the territorial capitol building when it caught fire on May 12, 1892, and also designing the first Flag of New Mexico in 1915.

== Early life and education ==
Ralph Emerson Twitchell was born in Ann Arbor, Michigan, to David Sawin and Delia Scott Twitchell. He received his Bachelor's degree from the University of Kansas and his L.L.B. from the University of Michigan Law School.

== Career ==
He first moved to New Mexico Territory in 1882, settling in Las Vegas, New Mexico to work in the law office of Henry L. Waldo. In 1897, Governor Miguel Otero appointed him judge advocate of the New Mexico militia and granted him the title of colonel. For the remainder of his life, Twitchell was always addressed respectfully as "colonel."

From 1889 to 1892 he was District Attorney for the First Judicial District. For forty-three years Twitchell worked in the legal department of the Santa Fe Railroad. In 1921, he was appointed special counsel for the United States Attorney General, specializing in Native American and water rights cases.

Twitchell was involved with numerous organizations in Santa Fe. He sat on the Board of Regents of the Museum of New Mexico. He founded and edited a historical quarterly called Old Santa Fe: A Magazine of History, Archaeology, Genealogy and Biography, which covered the activities of the Museum of New Mexico, Historical Society of New Mexico, and the Santa Fe branch of the School of American Archaeology. As President of the Santa Fe Chamber of Commerce from 1920-1922 he helped revive the Santa Fe Fiesta.

== Personal life ==
In 1885, he married Margaret Olivia Collins. He died August 25, 1925, at the age of 68 in Los Angeles, California.

== Bibliography ==
- Twitchell, Ralph Emerson (1912). Leading Facts of New Mexico's History. Vol. 2. Cedar Rapids, Ia.: The Torch Press. OCLC 14987171.
- Twitchell, Ralph Emerson (1914). The Spanish Archives of New Mexico. New York: Arno Press. OCLC 2188907.
- Old Santa Fe
- Twitchell, Ralph Emerson (1929). Genealogy of the Twitchell Family. New York, N.Y.: H.K. Twitchell. OCLC 260076039.
