= KDCE =

- Española, New Mexico; United States
- Broadcast area: Santa Fe area
- Frequency: 950 kHz
- Branding: Que Dice

Programming
- Language: Spanish
- Format: Adult contemporary

Ownership
- Owner: Richard L. Garcia Broadcasting, Inc.

History
- First air date: 1959
- Call sign meaning: "Que dice" ("what it says" in Spanish)

Technical information
- Licensing authority: FCC
- Facility ID: 56215
- Class: D
- Power: 4,200 watts (day); 80 watts (night)
- Transmitter coordinates: 36°0′8″N 106°3′59″W

Links
- Public license information: Public file; LMS
- Website: kdceradio.com

KDCE (950 AM) is a radio station broadcasting a Spanish Contemporary format. Licensed to Espanola, New Mexico, United States, the station serves the Santa Fe area. The station is currently owned by Richard L. Garcia Broadcasting, Inc.

== FM Translators ==
Broadcast translators for KDCE
Call sign	Frequency	City of license	FID	ERP (W)	Class	FCC info
K264BH	100.7 FM	Santa Fe, New Mexico	141244	250	D	LMS
K292GV	106.3 FM	Espanola, New Mexico	155103	250	D	LMS

== History ==
KDCE was previously owned by former Governor of New Mexico, John Burroughs. Burroughs sold the station to former Santa Fe Mayor George Abrán Gonzales, who owned and operated the station for fifteen years.
