= Fran Maier =

American entrepreneur

- Born: Fran Allocca; New Mexico, U.S.
- Education: Stanford University (AB, MBA)
- Occupation: Entrepreneur
- Years active: 1994–present
- Known for: Match.com (co-founder); TRUSTe (former president and CEO); BabyQuip (co-founder and CEO)

Fran Maier (née Allocca) is an American technology entrepreneur, best known as the co-founder and chief executive officer of BabyQuip, a global marketplace for baby-gear rentals.

She previously served as president and chief executive officer of the privacy-focused technology firm TRUSTe. She is also the co-founder of the online dating platform Match.com.

== Early life and education ==
Maier spent her early life in New Mexico and graduated from Santa Fe High School before entering Stanford University, where she earned an AB in public policy in 1984 and an MBA from the Stanford Graduate School of Business in 1989. At a class reunion in 1994 she re-connected with classmate Gary Kremen, a meeting that led directly to her involvement with the founding team of Match.com.

== Career ==
=== Match.com (1994–1998) ===
Maier joined the nascent Match.com in late 1994. She co-founded the online dating platform in 1995, and under her management, it grew to about 100,000 subscribers across major U.S. cities.

Maier subsequently became Match.com’s director of marketing. The Atlantic later noted that she played a key role in shaping the site’s business approach, introducing a subscription model and expanding its reach to varied groups, such as tech professionals and LGBTQ users.

=== Women.com and BlueLight.com (1999–2001) ===
Maier served as chief marketing officer at Women.com and later at Kmart-backed BlueLight.com, overseeing its e-commerce and internet service provider businesses during the dot-com boom.

=== TRUSTe/TrustArc (2001–2014) ===
In 2001, Maier joined TRUSTe as executive director. At the time, TRUSTe had recently been recognized by the Federal Trade Commission as a Children’s Online Privacy Protection Act (COPPA) Safe Harbor provider and was launching its Children’s Privacy Seal Program. In 2008, during her leadership, TRUSTe transitioned from a nonprofit organization to a venture-backed for-profit company, securing investment from Accel Partners.

=== BabyQuip (2016–present) ===
In 2016, Maier partnered with entrepreneur Kerri Couillard, who had founded the baby-gear rental start-up Babierge, to relaunch the business as a C corporation. Together, they co-founded the company and expanded its platform, which allows local providers, referred to as “Quality Providers”, to rent baby gear to travelers.

In 2017, Couillard departed the company, and Maier’s son, Joseph Maier, joined as chief technology officer. In 2018, the company rebranded from Babierge to BabyQuip. By 2023, BabyQuip reported more than 1,500 operating locations and US$8.5 million in capital raised. In 2024, BabyQuip’s net revenue exceeded $6 million.

== Personal life ==
Maier has two adult sons; her older son, Joseph Maier, serves as BabyQuip’s chief technology officer and appeared with her on Shark Tank.

== Awards and recognition ==
In 2016, Maier received the Jerry I. Porras Latino Leadership Award from the Stanford Graduate School of Business. In 2025, Maier was included in Forbes’s 50 Over 50: Lifestyle list. The same year, she was also included in Inc. magazine’s Female Founders 500 list.
