= Herbert James Hagerman =

American lawyer

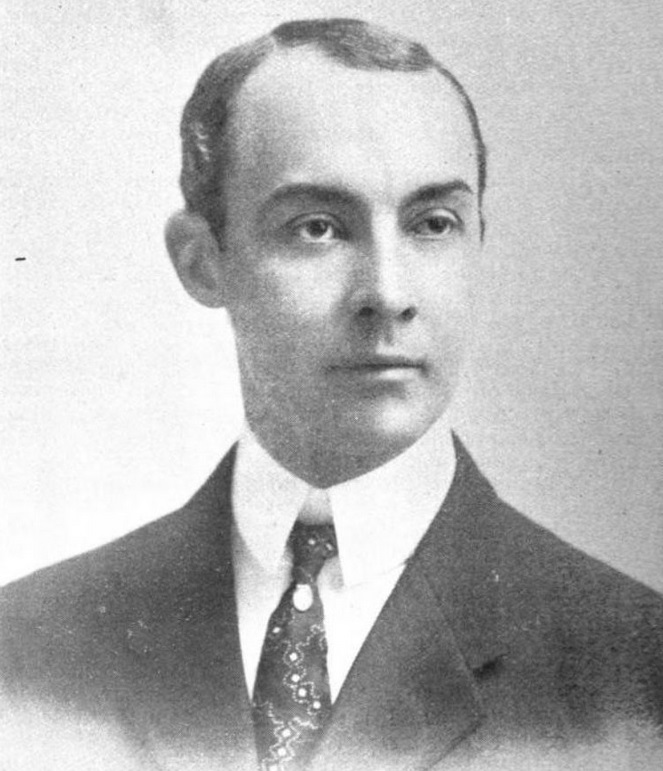
- Hagerman in 1904

16th Governor of New Mexico Territory
- In office January 10, 1906 – May 3, 1907
- Appointed by: Theodore Roosevelt
- Preceded by: Miguel Antonio Otero
- Succeeded by: George Curry

Personal details
- Born: December 15, 1871 Milwaukee, Wisconsin
- Died: January 29, 1935 (aged 63) Santa Fe, New Mexico
- Resting place: Forest Home Cemetery
- Party: Republican
- Education: Cornell Law School
- Occupation: Lawyer

Herbert James Hagerman (December 15, 1871 – January 29, 1935) was an American attorney, was the 16th governor of New Mexico Territory from 1906 to 1907.

== Early life ==
Hagerman was born in Milwaukee, Wisconsin to industrialist J. J. Hagerman.

== Career ==
In 1898, became Secretary to the United States Embassy in Russia, a position he held until 1901. Working closely with Ambassador Ethan A. Hitchcock, Hagerman impressed his boss with his abilities and his eagerness to stem waste and corruption. Hitchcock was recalled to Washington in 1899 to serve as Secretary of the Interior. Hagerman resumed practicing law and taking part in his father's New Mexico ranching interests. In 1903 he was appointed to New Mexico's Board of Managers for the Louisiana Purchase Exposition, also known as the St. Louis World's Fair. He was an alternate delegate to the 1904 Republican National Convention.

=== Law practice ===
After leaving office Hagerman returned to the practice of law in Santa Fe and Roswell. From 1923 to 1931 he served as federal commissioner to the Navajo nation, initially appointed by Albert Fall, a New Mexican who was serving as Secretary of the Interior.

== Death and burial ==
Hagerman died in Santa Fe, New Mexico on January 29, 1935.

== See also ==
- Thomas B. Catron
- Santa Fe Ring

Political offices
Preceded by Miguel Antonio Otero	Governor of New Mexico; 1906–1907	Succeeded by George Curry
