= William Taylor Thornton =

American politician in New Mexico (1843–1916)

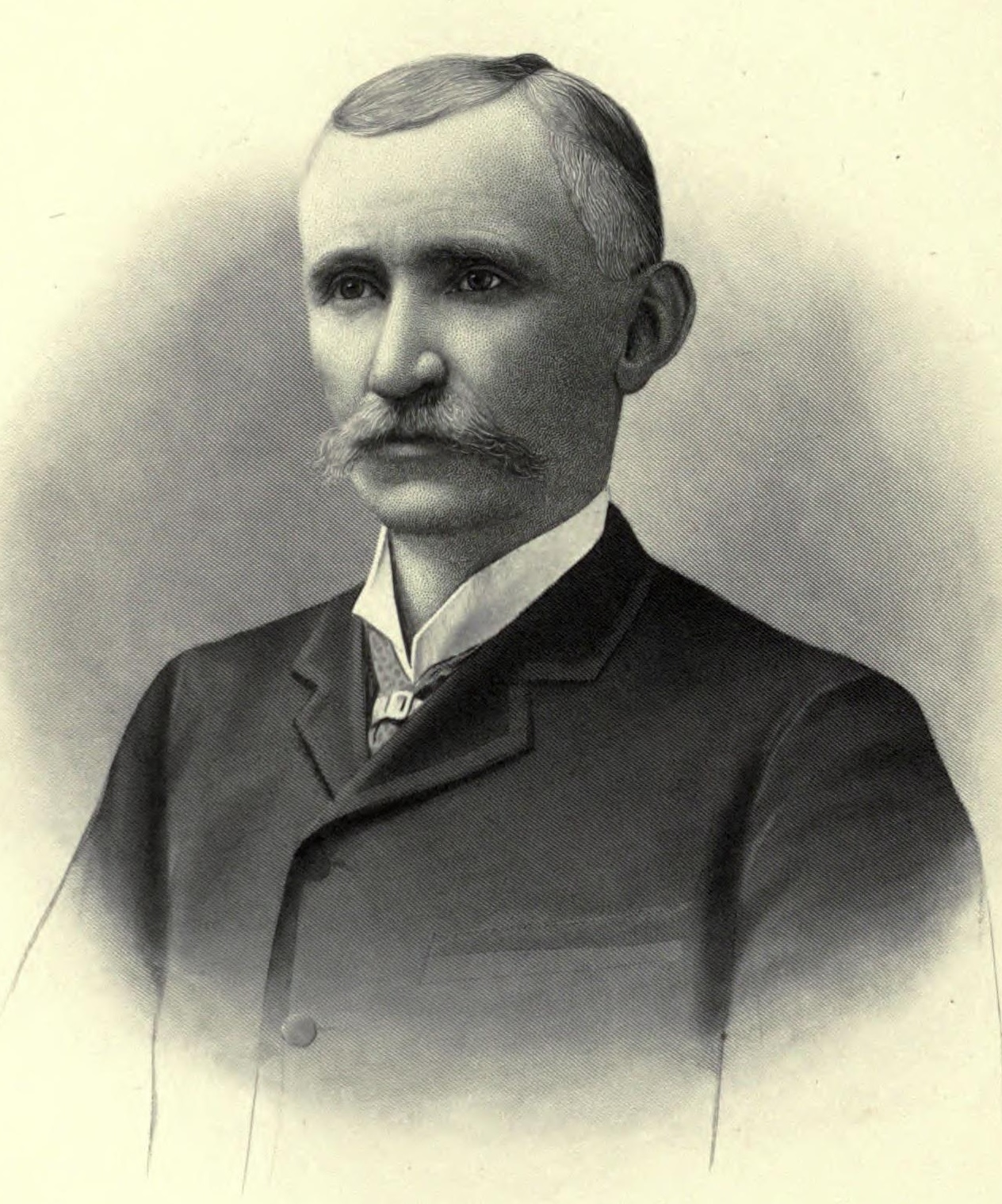

14th Governor of New Mexico Territory
- In office April 7, 1893 – April 5, 1897
- Appointed by: Grover Cleveland
- Preceded by: Bradford Prince
- Succeeded by: Miguel Antonio Otero

1st Mayor of Santa Fe
- In office 1891–1892
- Preceded by: Office Established
- Succeeded by: Manuel Valdez

Member of the New Mexico territorial council
- In office 1880–1880

Member of the Missouri House of Representatives
- In office 1876–1876

Personal details
- Born: February 9, 1843 Calhoun, Missouri
- Died: March 16, 1916 (aged 73) Santa Fe, New Mexico
- Resting place: Fairview Cemetery (Santa Fe, New Mexico)
- Party: Democratic
- Education: University of Kentucky
- Occupation: Lawyer

William Taylor Thornton (February 9, 1843 – March 16, 1916) was an American politician who served as the 14th governor of New Mexico Territory from 1893 to 1897.

== Early life ==
Thornton was born in Calhoun, Missouri on February 9, 1843. He was educated in Sedalia, Missouri and received a law degree from the University of Kentucky in 1861.

== Military service ==
He joined the Confederate States Army during the American Civil War, and served in the personal guard of General Sterling Price, and later in a company commanded by his brother Paul. Thornton was taken prisoner in February 1862 and was held in Illinois until his release the following October. he then returned to his company and continued to serve until the end of the war.

== Career ==
After the war Thornton passed the bar and began to practice law in Clinton, Missouri, and served two terms on the town council. He served in the Missouri House of Representatives in 1876.

Thornton relocated to New Mexico Territory in 1877, seeking a climate that would improve his health. He began to practice law in Santa Fe, New Mexico, and eventually formed a partnership with Thomas B. Catron. Though Thornton and Catron were both Confederate veterans from Missouri, Catron was a Republican, while Thornton was a Democrat. Thornton was also involved in several businesses, including mining, cattle ranching, real estate development, and land speculation.

Thornton was a member of New Mexico Legislative Council in 1880. In 1891 he was elected the first mayor of Santa Fe, and he served one two-year term.

In 1893 Thornton was appointed Governor, succeeding L. Bradford Prince. He served until 1897, and was succeeded by Miguel Antonio Otero.

After leaving the governorship Thornton returned to his legal and business interests. He died in Santa Fe on March 16, 1916. He was buried at Fairview cemetery in Santa Fe.
