= Larry Delgado =

American politician

40th Mayor of Santa Fe
- In office 1998–2006
- Preceded by: Debbie Jaramillo
- Succeeded by: David Coss

Personal details
- Born: 1936 (age 88–89)
- Political party: Democratic

Larry Delgado (born 1936) is an American politician who served as the mayor of Santa Fe, New Mexico from 1998 to 2006. He previously served two terms on the Santa Fe City Council, from 1990 to 1998.

== Career ==
He was elected mayor of Santa Fe in 1998 after defeating mayor Debbie Jaramillo and former mayor Sam Pick. In that election, he was viewed as taking a more centrist option between Jaramillo's anti-development policies and Pick's pro-development policies. He received 44% of the vote, ahead of Pick's 32% and Jaramillo's 11%. Delgado served two full terms as mayor, leaving office in 2006.

Delgado was appointed to the New Mexico Racing Commission by Governor Bill Richardson in 2006.
