= Debbie Jaramillo =

American politician (born 1952)

39th Mayor of Santa Fe
- In office 1994–1998
- Preceded by: Sam Pick
- Succeeded by: Larry Delgado

Personal details
- Born: 1952 (age 73–74)

Debbie Jaramillo (born 1952) is an American politician who served as the 39th mayor of Santa Fe, New Mexico from 1994 to 1998.

== Career ==
=== Mayor of Santa Fe ===
Jaramillo was elected mayor after serving six years on the city council. She was Santa Fe's first female mayor. As a city councilor, she had expressed concern about the gentrification of Santa Fe, which was forcing the primarily Hispanic local population to move out of its historical neighborhoods: "We painted our downtown brown and moved the brown people out", she said in 1991. She ran on a platform promising to place the interests of local residents above those of Santa Fe's booming tourist industry, in contrast to the more pro-development policies of the incumbent mayor, Sam Pick. Her campaign slogans included "Take back Santa Fe!", and in her victory speech she said, "This town is not for sale. It belongs to the community."

Jaramillo had previously run against Pick for mayor, unsuccessfully, and her 1994 election was viewed as an upset, since she had been outspent by her opponents and she had trailed in pre-election polls.

==== Tenure ====
Jaramillo's administration was marked by controversy. She pushed through a plan for the city, assisted by The Trust for Public Land, to acquire the 50-acre (200,000 m^{2}) Santa Fe Railyard property and begin its conversion into a public mixed-use development. A new police chief, Donald Grady, was hired in an effort to modernize and bring a community policing philosophy to the Santa Fe Police Department, whose previous chief had been a target of Jaramillo's criticism. However, Grady's efforts met strong opposition and he resigned in 1996. Grady was replaced by Jaramillo's brother-in-law. Since Jaramillo's brother, Ike Pino, was already the city manager, this appointment led to charges of nepotism, although Jaramillo defended her relatives, pointing out that Santa Fe had "always been a community that was related to one another." Shortly thereafter, Pino was removed from his city manager position by the city council.

In 1998, Jaramillo lost her re-election bid by a decisive margin. The winner, Larry Delgado, was viewed as taking a centrist position between the anti-development policies of Jaramillo and the pro-development policies of Sam Pick, who was also running for mayor again. Jaramillo received 11% of the vote, behind Delgado's 44% and Pick's 32%.

In 1999, Christine Marie Sierra, a political science professor at the University of New Mexico, produced a documentary about Jaramillo's election, entitled This Town Is Not For Sale!: The 1994 Santa Fe Mayoral Election.
