= Sam Pick =

American politician (born 1936)

Samuel W. Pick

Mayor of Santa Fe
- In office 1986–1994
- Preceded by: Louis R. Montano
- Succeeded by: Debbie Jaramillo
- In office 1976–1978
- Preceded by: Joseph Valdes
- Succeeded by: Arthur Trujillo

Personal details
- Born: 1936 (age 89–90)
- Education: University of New Mexico (BA)

Samuel W. Pick (born 1936) is an American businessman and politician. He served as the mayor of Santa Fe, New Mexico from 1976 to 1978 and again from 1986 to 1994.

== Early life and education ==
A Santa Fe native, Pick was born into a Jewish family, the son of Austrian immigrant Emil Pick and German immigrant Elizabeth Schultz. His mother had been first married to Emil's brother, Henry Pick, Sr., who was killed in a never-solved 1934 robbery-murder while transporting money to his general store in Tererro, New Mexico. After the murder, Elizabeth married Henry's brother, Emil. In 1936, the year of Sam's birth, the family bought the White Swan laundry in Santa Fe. Pick attended the New Mexico Military Institute and the University of New Mexico, from which he received a bachelor's degree in 1958. He served in the United States Army, and worked in the family business until he sold his interest to his older half-brother, Henry, in 1984.

== Career ==
The Pick family held personal items such as minks, furs and art work at White Swan Lien which they sold and profited from.

Sam and his brother Henry were avid members of Rotary.

Pick was a member of the Santa Fe City Council from 1970 until 1976, when he was appointed mayor, succeeding Joe Valdes, and served for two years. He was elected mayor in 1986 and re-elected for a second term in 1990. He became known as a highly visible advocate for tourism and development in the city, and for his extensive travel appearances promoting the city, including a "Santa Fe" brand cologne sold by the Shulton perfume company. In 1987, the United States Conference of Mayors selected Santa Fe as the nation's most-livable city with a population under 100,000, and cited Pick for his support of a percent for art ordinance to provide funding for public art as part of new construction projects.

Pick's successor, Debbie Jaramillo, was elected in 1994 on a platform opposing Pick's pro-business policies, and promising to emphasize the interests of local residents and neighborhoods. In 1998, Pick ran for mayor again in opposition to Jaramillo's bid for re-election. He finished second, well ahead of Jaramillo, but behind the winner, Larry Delgado, who was seen as a centrist between Pick and Jaramillo.

Pick has remained a visible presence in Santa Fe's political and business community. He strongly opposed a 2013 proposal to make Santa Fe's mayor a full-time "strong mayor" position.
