= George Abrán Gonzales =

American politician and musician (1938–2015)

Mayor of Santa Fe, New Mexico
- In office 1968–1972
- Preceded by: Pat Hollis
- Succeeded by: Joseph Valdes

Personal details
- Born: January 5, 1938 Santa Fe, New Mexico, U.S.
- Died: March 24, 2015 (aged 77) Santa Fe, New Mexico, U.S.
- Party: Democratic
- Spouse: Celine Gonzales
- Children: Javier Gonzales
- Education: College of Santa Fe

Military service
- Branch/service: United States Army

George Abrán Gonzales (January 5, 1938 – March 24, 2015) was an American politician, musician, and broadcaster who served as the mayor of Santa Fe, New Mexico, from 1968 to 1972. Gonzales, who was 30 years old at the time of the 1968 mayoral election, became the youngest mayor in Santa Fe's history. Gonzales is the father of Santa Fe's 42nd mayor, Javier Gonzales, who served from 2014 to 2018.

== Early life and education ==
George Gonzales was born to Porfiria and Alejandro Gonzales in his family's home on Agua Fría Street in Santa Fe on January 5, 1938. He was raised in the Agua Fria neighborhood. He became a musician and singer during his teens, performing traditional Spanish language songs as part of a musical trio with Albert Sanchez and Ernest Sanchez. The trio placed second in the "Lucky Strike Hour" competition, which was held in Las Vegas, Nevada. Gonzales, who was known for his baritone singing voice and guitar, later recorded several albums during his life.

Gonzales, who received the highest award at the State Spanish Elocution Competition, was elected Senior class president at Santa Fe High School.

He attended the College of Santa Fe and served in the Army National Guard after high school.

== Career ==
=== Broadcasting ===
Gonzales spent much of his professional career in radio broadcasting. He began his career as a radio announcer on KTRC, an AM radio station, in 1955. He then worked at as an announcer for KDCE, a radio station in Española, New Mexico, which was owned by former Governor John Burroughs. Gonzales soon purchased KDCE from Burroughs, which he owned and operated for fifteen years. He and his brother, Belarmino "Blackie" Gonzales, then founded Radio KBSO-FM, the first completely Spanish language radio station in northern New Mexico. In 1991, Gonzales acquired and launched another station, KSWV (known as "Que Suave"), which he ran with his four sons. He continued to work as an announcer and salesman for KSWV into the 2000s.

=== Politics ===
Gonzales began his political career as a member of the Santa Fe County Commission. He won election to the commission for two terms.

In 1968, he was elected mayor of Santa Fe, New Mexico. Gonzales, who was thirty years old at the time of the election, became the youngest mayor in Santa Fe's history. He served as mayor from 1968 to 1972. In 1972, he unsuccessfully ran for the United States House of Representatives.

His son, Javier Gonzales, was elected mayor of Santa Fe in 2014. George Gonzales worked as his son's campaign manager during the mayoral campaign.

Gonzales served on the boards of many community organizations, including the Santa Fe Fiesta Council. He was also the General Don Diego de Vargas at the Fiestas de Santa Fe, an annual city festival held in September. He has been honored and knighted by the El Morros de España.

== Personal life ==
George Gonzales died on March 24, 2015, at the age of 77. He was survived by his wife, Celine, and three of his four sons, Patricio "Patrick", Javier and Estevan. He was predeceased by a fourth son, George "Anthony" Gonzales. His funeral was held at the Cathedral Basilica of St. Francis of Assisi in Santa Fe with burial at Memorial Gardens. A public reception was held at the Santa Fe Community Convention Center following his funeral.
