= Michael Garcia (New Mexico politician) =

American politician (born 1979/80)

44th Mayor of Santa Fe
- Incumbent
- Assumed office January 1, 2026
- Preceded by: Alan Webber

Personal details
- Born: 1979 or 1980 (age 46–47) Santa Fe, New Mexico, U.S.
- Party: Nonpartisan
- Other political affiliations: Democratic
- Spouse: Elisha Valdez
- Children: 3
- Education: University of New Mexico (BA, MPA)

Michael J. Garcia (born 1979 or 1980) is an American politician who is currently serving as the 44th mayor of Santa Fe, New Mexico since 2026. He was previously a Santa Fe city councilor from 2020 to 2026, representing the 2nd district. Though mayoral elections in Santa Fe are nonpartisan, Garcia is affiliated with the Democratic Party.

== Early life and education ==
Michael Garcia was born in Santa Fe, New Mexico in 1979 or 1980, later attending Santa Fe High School. He holds a bachelor of political science and a master of public administration, both from the University of New Mexico.

== Political career ==
From 2020 to 2026, Garcia served on the Santa Fe city council representing the 2nd district.

In 2025, Garcia ran for mayor of Santa Fe, winning the runoff election in a landslide with 62.77% of the vote. His campaign issues included expanding the city's police force and building more affordable housing. In his December 2025 inauguration speech, Garcia named infrastructure, affordable housing and homelessness as priorities during his tenure.

== Personal life ==
Garcia has three children with his wife Elisha Valdez. He previously worked for AmeriCorps VISTA, including as the agency's New Mexico state director, before leaving the company in 2025 to avoid a potential conflict of interest as mayor.
