= List of mayors of Santa Fe, New Mexico =

Alcalde-Mayor of the City of Santa Fe
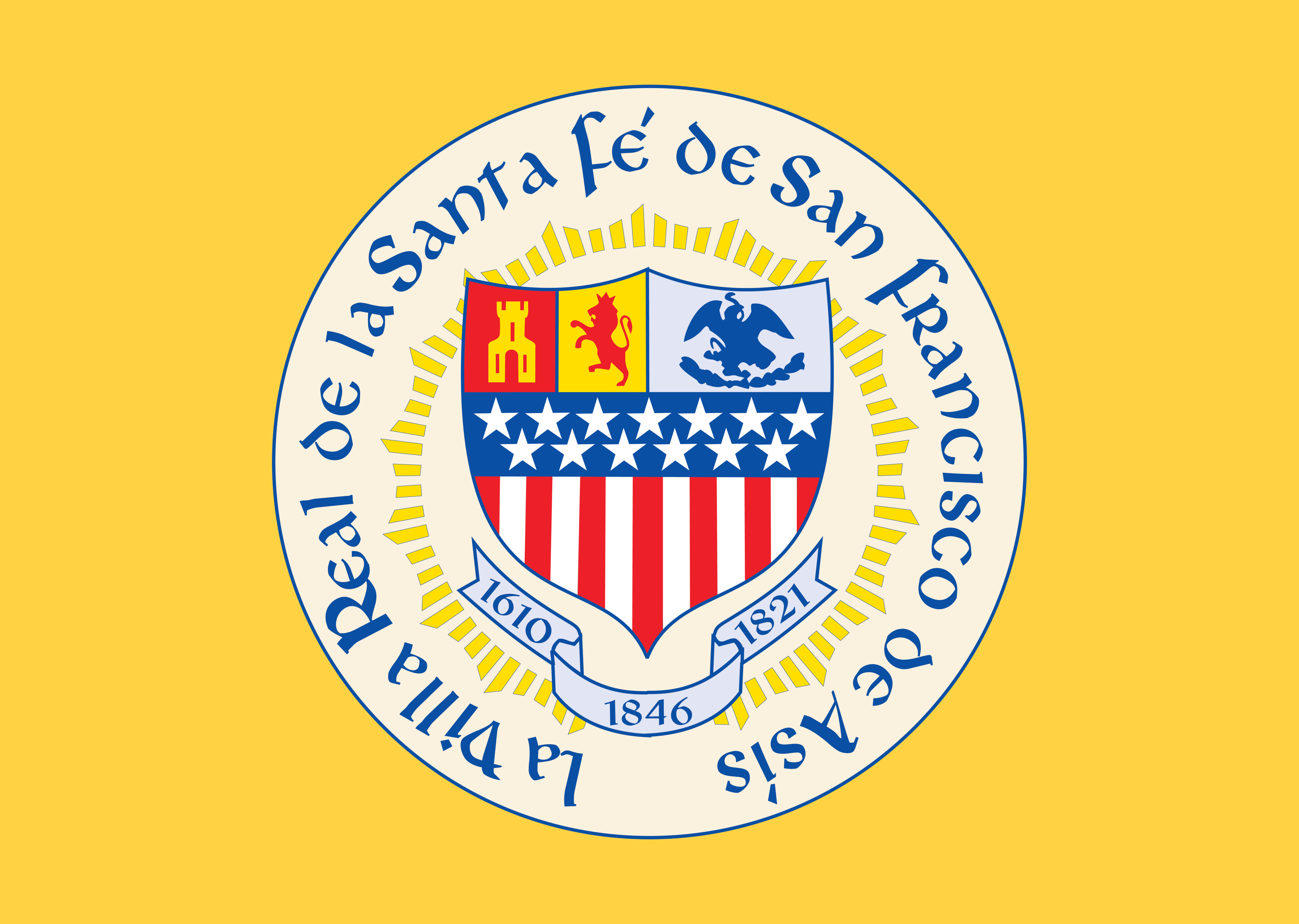
- Flag of Santa Fe
- Incumbent; Michael Garcia since January 1, 2026
- Style: His Honor
- Residence: Santa Fe, New Mexico, U.S.
- Term length: Four years; may serve two consecutive terms
- Inaugural holder: William Taylor Thornton
- Formation: 18th century
- Succession: Santa Fe County Commission
- Salary: $74,000
- Website: http://www.santafenm.gov

Mayor of the City of Santa Fe is head of the executive branch of Santa Fe, New Mexico's government. The mayor's office administers all city services, public property, police and fire protection, most public agencies, and enforces all city and state laws within the Santa Fe county.

The budget is overseen by the mayor's office and is set at approximately $500 million. The city expends approximately $355 million. The office of the mayor expends approximately $700,000 and the city government expends approximately $7 million. The mayor's office is located in Santa Fe City Hall. The mayor appoints a large number of officials, including commissioners who head city departments, and his deputy mayors. The mayor's regulations are compiled in the city of Santa Fe's Municipal Charter. According to current law, the mayor is limited to two consecutive four-year terms in office.

== Current mayor ==
Michael Garcia is serving as the 44th mayor of Santa Fe, New Mexico, succeeding Alan Webber. He was sworn in on December 30, 2025.

== Voting system ==
In 2018 the city switched to using transferable-vote ranked-choice voting to elect its mayor.

== Qualifications and duties ==
Section 5.01 (subsections A through O) of the City of Santa Fe's Municipal Charter, according to the most recent version passed in 2014, requires that the mayor:

1. be elected at large by the voters of the city;
2. have a vote on all matters that come before the governing body;
3. be the chief executive officer of the city whose position shall be full-time;
4. is entitled an initial salary of $74,000 until such time that an independent salary commission is established by city ordinance and such commission sets the salary for mayor;
5. appoint with the consent of the governing body, the city manager, city attorney, city clerk, and members of advisory commissions;
6. exercise administrative control and supervision over the city manager, city attorney and city clerk;
7. have the sole authority to remove the city manager, city attorney and city clerk;
8. cause the ordinances and regulations of the city to be faithfully and constantly obeyed;
9. have, within the city limits, the power conferred on the sheriffs of counties to suppress disorders and keep the peace;
10. propose programs and policies to the governing body;
11. represent the city in intergovernmental relationships;
12. present an annual state of the city message which shall identify among other matters the mayor's legislative agenda for the upcoming year;
13. work with city personnel and timely prepare an annual budget and proposed spending priority for review and approval by the finance committee and the governing body;
14. be recognized as head of the city government for all ceremonial purposes; and be recognized by the governor for purposes of military law.

and also that

- The Mayor of Santa Fe shall have a vote on all matters that come before the governing body and be the chief executive officer of the city whose position shall be full-time.

== List of mayors ==
The following is a list of the past and current mayor(s) of the city of Santa Fe, New Mexico.

1. William T. Thornton (1891–1892)
2. Manuel Valdez (1892–1893)
3. Ralph E. Twitchell (1893–1894)
4. J.H. Sloan (1894–1895)
5. Charles F. Easley (1895–1896)
6. Pedro Delgado (1896–1897)
7. Charles A. Spiess (1897–1898)
8. J.R. Hudson (1898–1899)
9. J.H. Sloan (1899–1901)
10. Amado Chavez (1901–1902)
11. I. Sparks (1902–1904)
12. A.R. Gibson (1904–1906)
13. Thomas B. Catron (1906–1908)
14. Jose D. Sena (1908–1910)
15. Arthur Seligman (1910–1912)
16. Celso Lopez (1912–1914)
17. William G. Sargent (1914–1918)
18. Edward P. Davies (1918–1920)
19. Thomas Z. Winter (1920–1922)
20. Charles C. Classon (1922–1924)
21. Nathan Jaffa (1924–1926)
22. Edward Safford (1926–1928)
23. James C. McConvery (1928–1932)
24. David Chávez (1932–1934)
25. Charles B. Barker (1934–1936)
26. Frank Andrews (1936–1938)
27. Alfredo Ortiz (1938–1942)
28. Manuel Lujan Sr. (1942–1948)
29. Frank S. Ortiz (1948–1952)
30. Paul Huss (1952–1956)
31. Leo Murphy (1956–1962)
32. Pat Hollis (1962–1968)
33. George Abrán Gonzales (1968–1972)
34. Joseph E. Valdes (1972–1976)
35. Samuel W. Pick (1976–1978)
36. Arthur E. Trujillo (1978–1982)
37. Louis R. Montano (1982–1986)
38. Samuel W. Pick (1986–1994)
39. Debbie Jaramillo (1994–1998)
40. Larry Delgado (1998–2006)
41. David Coss (2006–2014)
42. Javier Gonzales (2014–2018)
43. Alan Webber (2018–2025)
44. Michael Garcia (2026–present)

== See also ==
- Timeline of Santa Fe, New Mexico
