= KSWV =

Radio station in Santa Fe, New Mexico

Santa Fe, New Mexico; United States
- Frequency: 810 kHz
- Branding: Classic Hits KSWV

Programming
- Format: Classic hits

Ownership
- Owner: Celina Gonzales; (GCBendito 4 LLC)

History
- First air date: 1966
- Former call signs: KAFE (1966–1987); KMIK (1987–1991)

Technical information
- Licensing authority: FCC
- Facility ID: 36194
- Class: D
- Power: 5,000 watts (day); 10 watts (night)
- Transmitter coordinates: 35°42′5″N 105°57′58″W
- Translator: 99.9 K260CT (Santa Fe)

Links
- Public license information: Public file; LMS
- Webcast: Listen live
- Website: SantaFeToday.com/kswv

KSWV (810 AM) is a commercial radio station licensed to Santa Fe, New Mexico, United States, and featuring a classic hits format. It is owned by Celina Gonzales, through licensee GCBendito 4 LLC. The studios and offices are co-located with the publication Santa Fe Today on Taos Street in Santa Fe.

KSWV's transmitter is sited off Buckman Road in Santa Fe. Programming is also heard on low-power FM translator K260CT at 99.9 MHz in Santa Fe.

== History ==
The station went on the air as KAFE in 1966. It later became KMIK on July 22, 1987.

In 1991, the KMIK was acquired by George Abrán Gonzales, who has served as the mayor of Santa Fe from 1968 to 1972. Gonzalez changed the station's call sign to KSWV (Que Suave) on November 11, 1991. He operated the station with his four sons.

On February 17, 2016 a construction permit was granted by the FCC to move translator K294BS out of Hereford, Texas to Santa Fe, New Mexico to rebroadcast KSWV at 99.9 MHz giving the station a 250 watt FM signal. La Voz Broadcasting had purchased the translator from Educational Media Foundation in January 2016. A license for the translator at the new frequency and community of license as K260CT was issued on September 30, 2016.

Effective November 22, 2017, the licenses for KSWV and translator K260CT were transferred from La Voz Broadcasting to GCBendito 4 LLC; both entities are owned by Celina Gonzales.

In early 2019 the station changed formats from Spanish variety to classic hits.
