= Alan Webber =

American entrepreneur and politician

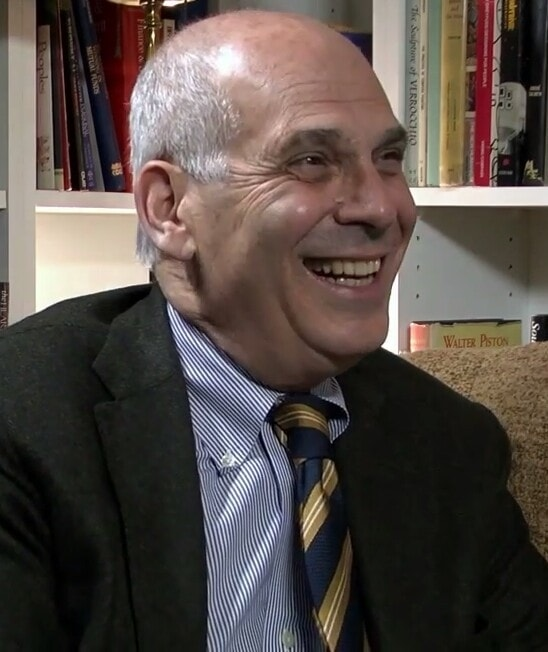
- Webber in 2013

43rd Mayor of Santa Fe
- In office March 12, 2018 – December 30, 2025
- Preceded by: Javier Gonzales
- Succeeded by: Michael Garcia

Personal details
- Born: September 18, 1948 (age 78) St. Louis, Missouri, U.S.
- Party: Democratic
- Spouse: Frances Diemoz (m. 1977)
- Children: 2
- Education: Amherst College (BA)

Alan M. Webber (born September 18, 1948) is an American entrepreneur, author, publisher, and politician who previously served as the 43rd mayor of Santa Fe, New Mexico from 2018 to 2025.

Previous to his assumption of the mayoralty, he ran unsuccessfully for Governor of New Mexico as a member of the Democratic Party during the 2014 primary elections. Webber is also known for founding the technology business magazine, Fast Company in 1995.

== Early life and education ==
Webber's father was a camera salesman. Webber started school at DeMun School in Clayton, Missouri, and later attended Mary Institute and St. Louis Country Day School. He went on to graduate from Amherst College with a Bachelor of Arts in English. While an employee of Harvard Business School, Webber worked with faculty on Changing Alliances, a book-length study of the competitiveness of the U.S. auto industry.

== Career ==
After graduating from Amherst, Webber moved to Portland, Oregon, where he worked at a start-up political journal, The Oregon Times. Subsequently, he served in the office of then-Portland City Council member Neil Goldschmidt and continued as his administrative assistant and policy advisor when he became mayor of Portland in 1972. The years Webber spent working alongside Goldschmidt resulted in Webber identifying Goldschmidt as his dear friend and mentor.

Beginning in 1978, Webber served as editorial page editor of the alternative Oregon weekly newspaper, Willamette Week, where he received an Oregon State Newspaper Publisher's Association Award for news and feature writing. In 1980, Webber and his family moved to Washington, D.C., when Goldschmidt was named Secretary of Transportation in the Carter administration. While working as Special Assistant to the Secretary of Transportation, Webber worked on the Chrysler Corporation bailout, the crisis in the U.S. auto industry, and overall national economic competitiveness issues.

Webber worked at the Harvard Business School in 1981 as a senior research assistant and project coordinator on the auto industry in the United States. The project culminated in a book called Changing Alliances. He served as managing editor and editorial director of the Harvard Business Review for six years, when the publication was a finalist for National Magazine Awards.

In 1995, Webber co-founded the technology business magazine, Fast Company, where he was named Adweek's Editor of the Year in 1999. In 2000, investors sold Fast Company for $360 million, which was at the time the second highest price ever paid for a U.S. magazine.

Webber worked as a speechwriter and policy advisor for several governors, including Massachusetts Governor (and later Democratic presidential candidate) Michael Dukakis. Since 2010 he has been a member of the Academic Advisory Board of the Upper Austrian Think Tank Academia Superior – Institute for Future Studies.

=== Politics ===
In October 2013, Webber declared his candidacy for the Democratic Party nomination for governor of New Mexico in the 2014 New Mexico gubernatorial election. Webber finished in second place, with 22.6% of the vote, trailing Gary King, who received 35% of the vote.

In 2018, Webber ran for mayor of Santa Fe, as the incumbent, Javier Gonzales, was not seeking reelection. In an election using ranked choice voting, Webber prevailed, defeating three members of the city council and a member of the school board. He was the first choice on 39% of ballots, but ended up with 66% of the vote after the fourth round of the runoff.

The Statue of Diego de Vargas was removed from Cathedral Park under the direction of Alan Webber in June 2020.

During a period of pro-Palestinian protests in the United States, Webber criticized two event cancellations:

- Meow Wolf cancelled a concert by pro-Israel alternative rapper Matisyahu at the entertainment company's Santa Fe headquarters in February 2024, citing safety concerns; Webber issued a statement, saying "there is a significant difference between protesting the policies of the Netanyahu government in Gaza and shutting down the performance of a Jewish-American artist in Santa Fe."
- Four Seasons Hotels and Resorts cancelled a planned visit by Israeli Consul General Livia Link-Raviv to the Global Santa Fe conference in March 2024.

== Publications ==
- (co-author) Changing Alliances - The Harvard Business School Project On The Auto Industry And The American Economy, 1987, ISBN 978-0071032308
- (co-author) Going Global, 1996, ISBN 978-0670863082
- Rules of Thumb: 52 Truths for Winning at Business Without Losing Your Self, 2009, paperback ed. 2010 ISBN 978-0061721847
- The Global Detective, 2010, Kindle eBook
- (co-author) Life Reimagined: Discovering Your New Life Possibilities, 2013, ISBN 978-1609949327

He has also written columns and articles for The Los Angeles Times, The New York Times, U.S.A. Today, Huffington Post, The New York Times Sunday Magazine and The Washington Post. Life Reimagined was featured in Forbes as one of "The Best New Books For Your Career".

== Awards and recognition ==
Webber received an Honorary Doctor of Humane Letters from the Boston Architectural College in 2012.

== Personal life ==
Webber married Frances Diemoz, an architect and furniture maker, in 1977. In 2003, they moved to New Mexico. They have two children.

Political offices
Preceded by Javier Gonzales	Mayor of Santa Fe; 2018–2025	Succeeded by Michael Garcia
