= Javier Gonzales =

American politician (1966–2022)

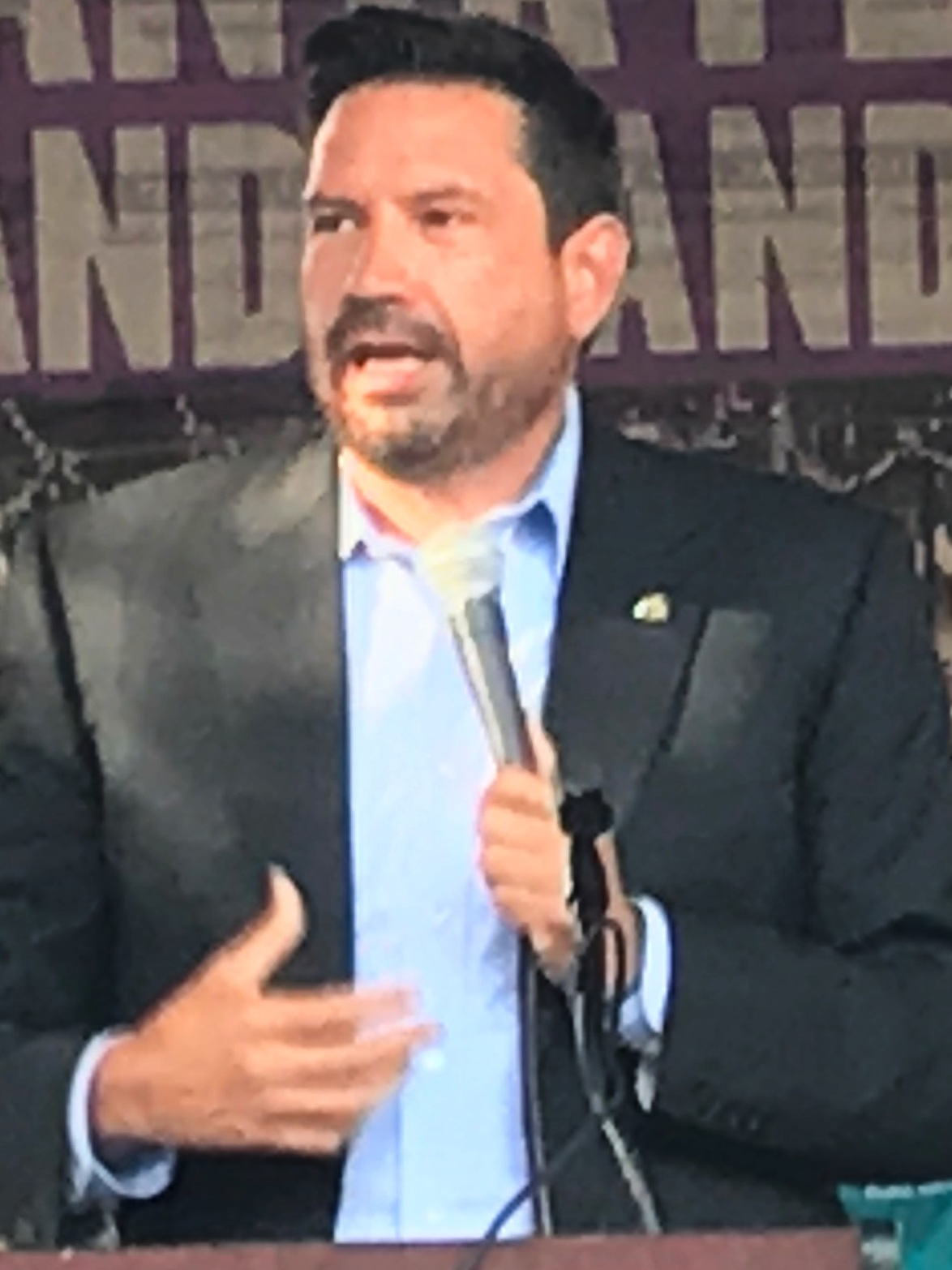

42nd Mayor of Santa Fe
- In office March 11, 2014 – March 12, 2018
- Preceded by: David Coss
- Succeeded by: Alan Webber

Chair of the New Mexico Democratic Party
- In office September 12, 2009 – April 27, 2013
- Preceded by: Annadelle Sanchez (Acting)
- Succeeded by: Sam Bregman

Personal details
- Born: August 1, 1966
- Died: February 9, 2022 (aged 55)
- Party: Democratic
- Children: 2
- Education: New Mexico State University
- Website: Official government website

Javier Gonzales (August 1, 1966 – February 9, 2022) was an American politician who served as the 42nd mayor of Santa Fe from 2014 to 2018. Gonzales was the city's first and only openly gay mayor. He held the office of Santa Fe County Commissioner, serving two terms. Soon after, he was elected as the first Hispanic president to the National Association of Counties. Upon assuming the mayorship of Santa Fe, he was chair of the Democratic Party of New Mexico.

He ran for mayor promising to progress equal rights, improve the educational system, diversifying the economy, promote the youth, and increase environmentalism. He voted to build the largest assisted living facility in the city on Old Pecos Trail, created a climate task force, proposed affordable housing measures, instated a cultural district to combat counterfeit art sales, and increased internet and technological advancements for the city. He was a vocal supporter of gun control and regulation. In 2015, he started the Santa Fe Gun Violence Table as a forum and action committee to address mass-killing prevention and to ensure the safety of citizens.

Gonzales publicly disagreed with the actions of then-Governor Susana Martinez, and other Republican legislators. Most notably he condemned the actions of Martinez in her opposition to accepting more Syrian immigrants into the United States.

== Early life and education ==
Gonzales was the first to go college in his family and graduated from New Mexico State University with a degree in accounting. He was the son of George Abrán Gonzales, who served as the mayor of Santa Fe from 1968 to 1972. In 2016, Gonzales was awarded a scholarship to attend a Harvard Kennedy School program for senior executives in state and local government.

== Career ==
Gonzales served on the Santa Fe County Commission for two terms. In 2001, he was elected as the first Hispanic President of the National Association of Counties. As President, he led a national organization that represents more than 3,000 counties nationwide. Prior to his election to the mayoralty, he worked as vice-president of real estate firm Rosemont Realty, and served as chair of the state Democratic Party.

=== Mayor of Santa Fe (2014–2018) ===
On August 29, 2013, he announced his candidacy to become the next mayor of Santa Fe. He ran himself as "a strong advocate for labor unions and the working-class."

On March 4, 2014, Gonzales won the Mayoralty of Santa Fe, and was sworn in the Greer Garson Theatre at the Santa Fe University of Art and Design. He stated at his installation, "I stand before you humbled. I stand before you standing on the shoulders of people like Mayor David Coss and my father and so many who have been before in this position to say that I am ready to accept the responsibility and the honor of being your mayor."

==== Gun policy ====
He was a vocal supporter of gun safety and stronger gun control. In 2015, he started the Santa Fe Gun Violence Table as a forum and action committee to address mass-killing prevention and ensure the safety of citizens. Gonzales with a local organization, "New Mexicans to Prevent Gun Violence" handed out free gunlocks provided by the Santa Fe Police Department, as well as educational material on gun safety and control.

==== Equal rights ====
Gonzales, as a progressive candidate, ran on the promise of equal rights for all, and appointed two openly gay women to the Santa Fe City Council on which there are eight seats.

==== Economic policy ====
He sought to expand the living wage throughout the county, and subsequently helped organize the effort to establish a municipal minimum wage, currently set at $10.51, one of the highest in the country. He was heavily criticized for supporting a corporate tax cut initiated by Governor Susana Martinez. He defended his actions stating that the tax cut was a "comprehensive tax reform that makes New Mexico competitive with surrounding states"

==== Controversies ====
During the campaign, a complaint was filed with the Santa Fe Ethics and Campaign Review Board against Gonzales by Fred Rowe, a supporter of mayoral candidate Patti Bushee, alleging that Gonzales was violating campaign finance regulations by actively coordinating with various political action committees which had endorsed him. Gonzales stated during the campaign that he defended the rights of outside groups to participate in election campaigns, but was not seeking and did not need support from PACs. The board voted unanimously to dismiss the complaint, on the basis that it relied on innuendo and hearsay and lacked any properly substantiated evidence of ethical or legal violations.

Gonzales issued an executive order banning city employees from traveling to states with religious freedom laws he claims are anti-gay. Shortly afterwards, he traveled to the Islamic nation of Qatar, which criminalizes gay relations, leading many to accuse him of hypocrisy.

==== Succession ====
On March 12, 2018, Gonzales was succeeded by entrepreneur Alan Webber who became the 43rd mayor of Santa Fe.

== Personal life and death ==
Gonzales resided in Santa Fe, New Mexico and had two daughters, Cadence and Cameron. He served on the board of regents for New Mexico State University. Gonzales was the city's first openly-gay mayor. He issued a press release after the first same-sex marriage licenses were distributed, entitled "My Renewed Faith in Santa Fe." In the release, he stated "You see, when you come from a traditional family with deep roots in this community, the process of accepting that you are gay is complicated with fears about disappointing those you love, or becoming disconnected with a sense of place that is as much a part of me as my sexuality."

Javier Gonzales died from cancer on February 9, 2022, at the age of 55.
