= David Coss =

American politician

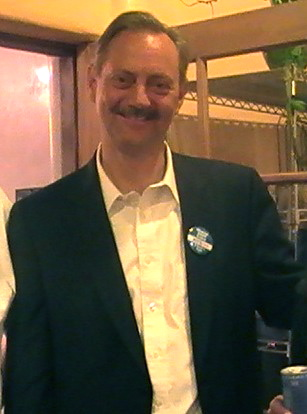

41st Mayor of Santa Fe
- In office 2006 – March 10, 2014
- Preceded by: Larry Delgado
- Succeeded by: Javier Gonzales

Member of the Santa Fe City Council from the 3rd district
- In office 2002–2006

Personal details
- Born: Carbondale, Illinois, U.S.
- Party: Democratic
- Spouse: Carol Rose
- Children: 2
- Education: New Mexico State University (BS); Southern Illinois University Carbondale (MS)

David Coss is an American politician and civil servant who served as mayor of Santa Fe, New Mexico from 2006 to 2014. He was elected to a four-year term in March 2006 after serving on the Santa Fe City Council from 2002 to 2006, representing the third district. He was elected to a second four-year term in March 2010.

== Early life and education ==
Coss was born in Carbondale, Illinois and raised in Santa Fe, New Mexico. He graduated from Santa Fe High School in 1972. He has a bachelor's degree in agriculture from New Mexico State University and a master's degree in zoology from Southern Illinois University Carbondale.

== Career ==
As a City Councilor, he co-sponsored Santa Fe's Living Wage Ordinance and supported a subsequent minimum wage increase to $9.50 per hour. Coss also supported the Santa Fe Homes Program, an award-winning ordinance that requires 30 percent affordable housing in all new residential developments in Santa Fe. As mayor, he is a member of the Mayors Against Illegal Guns Coalition, a bi-partisan group with a stated goal of "making the public safer by getting illegal guns off the streets." The Coalition is co-chaired by Boston Mayor Thomas Menino and New York City Mayor Michael Bloomberg.

Prior to his election as mayor, Coss served as director of the New Mexico Environmental Protection Division, environmental scientist for the New Mexico Environment Department, director of the Field Operations Division of the State Land Office, of Santa Fe Public Works, and city manager of the Santa Fe.

Coss is a longtime union supporter and has served in the capacities of organizer, negotiator, and president of Communications Workers of America State Government Local.

== Personal life ==
Coss and his wife, Carol, have two children. He is a Roman Catholic.
