= 1934 New Mexico gubernatorial election =

- November 6, 1934
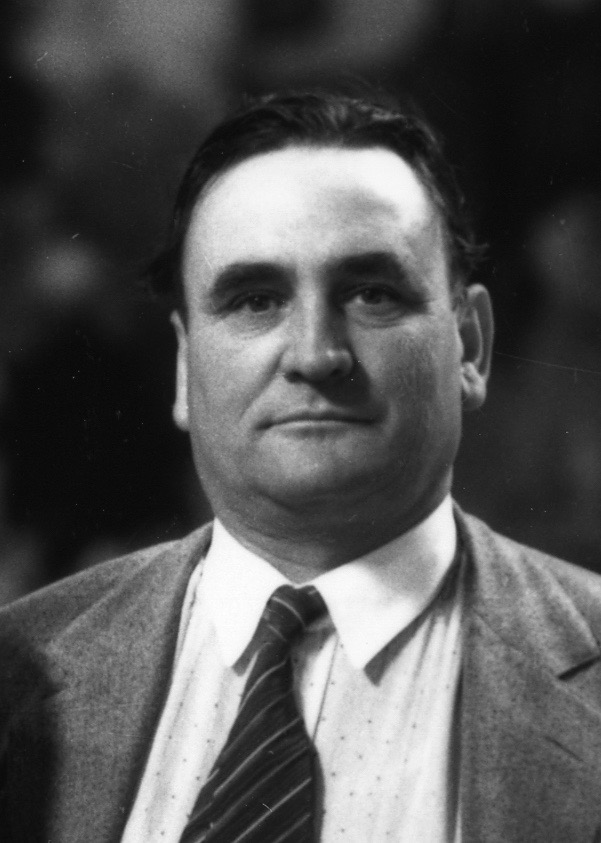

| Nominee | Clyde Tingley | Jaffa Miller |
| Party | Democratic | Republican |
| Popular vote | 78,390 | 71,899 |
| Percentage | 51.90% | 47.60% |
- County results Tingley: 50–60% 60–70% 70–80% Miller: 50–60% 60–70%
Governor before election
Andrew W. Hockenhull
Democratic
Elected Governor
Clyde Tingley
Democratic

The 1934 New Mexico gubernatorial election took place on November 6, 1934, in order to elect the Governor of New Mexico. Incumbent Democrat Andrew W. Hockenhull, who had succeeded to the governorship in 1933 following the death of Arthur Seligman, did not run for election to a full term.

== General election ==
=== Results ===
1934 New Mexico gubernatorial election
| Party | Candidate | Votes | % | ±% |
|---|---|---|---|---|
| Democratic | Clyde Tingley | 78,390 | 51.90% | −2.92% |
| Republican | Jaffa Miller | 71,899 | 47.60% | +3.41% |
| Socialist | E. R. Frost | 634 (Note: The county figures for Frost add up to 638. The canvass printed in the 1935-36 Blue Book contains a number of misprints in every race, but these cannot be reconciled because the State Archives does not have the original handwritten canvass. Trying to use the semi-official precinct data in the Blue Book does not reconcile the numbers either.) | 0.42% | −0.27% |
| Communist | Philip Howe | 132 | 0.09% | +0.01% |
| Majority | | 6,491 | 4.30% | |
| Total votes | | 151,055 | 100.00% | |
| Democratic hold | | Swing | -6.33% | |

=== Results by county ===
| County | Clyde Tingley Democratic | | Jaffa Miller Republican | | E. R. Frost Socialist | | Philip Howe Communist | | Margin | | Total votes cast |
| County | # | % | # | % | # | % | # | % | # | % | Total votes cast |
|---|---|---|---|---|---|---|---|---|---|---|---|
| Bernalillo | 10,599 | 56.67% | 8,076 | 43.18% | 17 | 0.09% | 10 | 0.05% | 2,523 | 13.49% | 18,702 |
| Catron | 1,057 | 53.04% | 917 | 46.01% | 15 | 0.75% | 4 | 0.20% | 140 | 7.02% | 1,993 |
| Chaves | 3,029 | 55.41% | 2,416 | 44.19% | 15 | 0.27% | 7 | 0.13% | 613 | 11.21% | 5,467 |
| Colfax | 3,851 | 52.09% | 3,503 | 47.38% | 18 | 0.24% | 21 | 0.28% | 348 | 4.71% | 7,393 |
| Curry | 3,287 | 68.07% | 1,455 | 30.13% | 81 | 1.68% | 6 | 0.12% | 1,832 | 37.94% | 4,829 |
| De Baca | 642 | 51.48% | 599 | 48.04% | 6 | 0.48% | 0 | 0.00% | 43 | 3.45% | 1,247 |
| Doña Ana | 3,789 | 50.75% | 3,607 | 48.31% | 68 | 0.91% | 2 | 0.03% | 182 | 2.44% | 7,466 |
| Eddy | 2,722 | 70.76% | 1,108 | 28.80% | 17 | 0.44% | 0 | 0.00% | 1,614 | 41.95% | 3,847 |
| Grant | 2,283 | 53.78% | 1,951 | 45.96% | 7 | 0.16% | 4 | 0.09% | 332 | 7.82% | 4,245 |
| Guadalupe | 1,742 | 48.04% | 1,882 | 51.90% | 2 | 0.06% | 0 | 0.00% | -140 | -3.86% | 3,626 |
| Harding | 1,093 | 46.04% | 1,266 | 53.33% | 15 | 0.63% | 0 | 0.00% | -173 | -7.29% | 2,374 |
| Hidalgo | 884 | 63.32% | 509 | 36.46% | 3 | 0.21% | 0 | 0.00% | 375 | 26.86% | 1,396 |
| Lea | 1,734 | 75.33% | 520 | 22.59% | 46 | 2.00% | 2 | 0.09% | 1,214 | 52.74% | 2,302 |
| Lincoln | 1,719 | 48.49% | 1,804 | 50.89% | 13 | 0.37% | 9 | 0.25% | -85 | -2.40% | 3,545 |
| Luna | 1,137 | 51.42% | 1,061 | 47.99% | 10 | 0.45% | 3 | 0.14% | 76 | 3.44% | 2,211 |
| McKinley | 1,925 | 54.44% | 1,572 | 44.46% | 1 | 0.03% | 38 | 1.07% | 353 | 9.98% | 3,536 |
| Mora | 2,241 | 49.42% | 2,294 | 50.58% | 0 | 0.00% | 0 | 0.00% | -53 | -1.17% | 4,535 |
| Otero | 1,514 | 51.80% | 1,385 | 47.38% | 24 | 0.82% | 0 | 0.00% | 129 | 4.41% | 2,923 |
| Quay | 2,190 | 54.97% | 1,779 | 44.65% | 13 | 0.33% | 2 | 0.05% | 411 | 10.32% | 3,984 |
| Rio Arriba | 4,482 | 52.89% | 3,991 | 47.10% | 0 | 0.00% | 1 | 0.01% | 491 | 5.79% | 8,474 |
| Roosevelt | 2,127 | 71.52% | 706 | 23.74% | 137 | 4.61% | 4 | 0.13% | 1,421 | 47.78% | 2,974 |
| San Juan | 1,179 | 46.22% | 1,325 | 51.94% | 45 | 1.76% | 2 | 0.08% | -146 | -5.72% | 2,551 |
| San Miguel | 3,790 | 35.12% | 6,994 | 64.81% | 2 | 0.02% | 5 | 0.05% | -3,204 | -29.69% | 10,791 |
| Sandoval | 1,872 | 48.55% | 1,980 | 51.35% | 4 | 0.10% | 0 | 0.00% | -108 | -2.80% | 3,856 |
| Santa Fe | 5,075 | 50.68% | 4,931 | 49.24% | 4 | 0.04% | 4 | 0.04% | 144 | 1.44% | 10,014 |
| Sierra | 1,029 | 46.50% | 1,157 | 52.28% | 25 | 1.13% | 2 | 0.09% | -128 | -5.78% | 2,213 |
| Socorro | 2,444 | 54.23% | 2,060 | 45.71% | 1 | 0.02% | 2 | 0.04% | 384 | 8.52% | 4,507 |
| Taos | 2,671 | 44.35% | 3,338 | 55.43% | 11 | 0.18% | 2 | 0.03% | -667 | -11.08% | 6,022 |
| Torrance | 2,119 | 47.83% | 2,287 | 51.63% | 24 | 0.54% | 0 | 0.00% | -168 | -3.79% | 4,430 |
| Union | 2,184 | 51.46% | 2,045 | 48.19% | 14 | 0.33% | 1 | 0.02% | 139 | 3.28% | 4,244 |
| Valencia | 1,980 | 36.93% | 3,381 | 63.05% | 0 | 0.00% | 1 | 0.02% | -1,401 | -26.13% | 5,362 |
| Total | 78,390 | 51.90% | 71,899 | 47.60% | 634 | 0.42% | 132 | 0.09% | 6,491 | 4.30% | 151,059 |

==== Counties that flipped from Republican to Democratic ====
- Colfax

==== Counties that flipped from Democratic to Republican ====
- Lincoln
- Mora
- San Juan
- Sierra
- Taos
