= 1930 New Mexico gubernatorial election =

- November 4, 1930
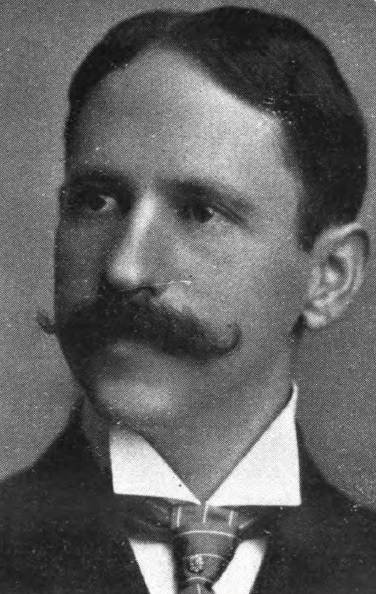

Nominee	Arthur Seligman	Clarence M. Botts
Party	Democratic	Republican
Popular vote	62,789	55,026
Percentage	53.17%	46.60%
- County results Seligman: 50–60% 60–70% 70–80% 80–90% Botts: 50–60% 60–70%
Governor before election
Richard C. Dillon
Republican
Elected Governor
Arthur Seligman
Democratic

The 1930 New Mexico gubernatorial election took place on November 4, 1930, in order to elect the governor of New Mexico. Incumbent Republican Richard C. Dillon was term-limited, and could not run for reelection to a third consecutive term. Democrat Arthur Seligman defeated Republican Clarence M. Botts by about 6.5 points. Seligman was the first Democratic gubernatorial candidate to ever win Santa Fe County and Taos County, and the first Democratic candidate to carry Guadalupe County since 1916.

== General election ==
=== Results ===
1930 New Mexico gubernatorial election
Party	Candidate	Votes	%	±%
Democratic	Arthur Seligman	62,789	53.17%	+8.87%
Republican	Clarence M. Botts	55,026	46.60%	−9.02%
Socialist	Sam Butler	278 (Note: The 1931-1932 Blue Book credits Butler with 274 votes, but the original handwritten canvass gives his total as 278. The difference is the original canvass lists 2 votes each in McKinley and Rio Arriba counties, but the Blue Book omits these.)	0.24%	
Majority		7,763	6.57%	
Total votes		118,093	100.00%	
Democratic gain from Republican		Swing	+17.88%	

=== Results by county ===
County	Arthur Seligman Democratic		Clarence M. Botts Republican		Sam Butler Socialist		Margin		Total votes cast
County	#	%	#	%	#	%	#	%	Total votes cast
Bernalillo	7,694	53.42%	6,694	46.48%	15	0.10%	1,000	6.94%	14,403
Catron	621	48.74%	648	50.86%	5	0.39%	-27	-2.12%	1,274
Chaves	2,458	53.33%	2,123	46.06%	28	0.61%	335	7.27%	4,609
Colfax	3,125	50.47%	3,055	49.34%	12	0.19%	70	1.13%	6,192
Curry	2,169	72.61%	791	26.48%	27	0.90%	1,378	46.13%	2,987
De Baca	767	68.00%	361	32.00%	0	0.00%	406	35.99%	1,128
Doña Ana	2,608	50.96%	2,498	48.81%	12	0.23%	110	2.15%	5,118
Eddy	1,780	70.00%	752	29.57%	11	0.43%	1,028	40.42%	2,543
Grant	2,802	63.67%	1,584	35.99%	15	0.34%	1,218	27.68%	4,401
Guadalupe	1,727	57.09%	1,296	42.84%	2	0.07%	431	14.25%	3,025
Harding	1,131	59.65%	756	39.87%	9	0.47%	375	19.78%	1,896
Hidalgo	723	63.31%	416	36.43%	3	0.26%	307	26.88%	1,142
Lea	1,196	82.09%	259	17.78%	2	0.14%	937	64.31%	1,457
Lincoln	1,213	45.81%	1,429	53.97%	6	0.23%	-216	-8.16%	2,648
Luna	653	37.19%	1,087	61.90%	16	0.91%	-434	-24.72%	1,756
McKinley	1,609	48.97%	1,675	50.97%	2	0.06%	-66	-2.01%	3,286
Mora	2,010	51.05%	1,927	48.95%	0	0.00%	83	2.11%	3,937
Otero	1,482	56.46%	1,130	43.05%	13	0.50%	352	13.41%	2,625
Quay	1,965	64.36%	1,073	35.15%	15	0.49%	892	29.22%	3,053
Rio Arriba	3,263	49.83%	3,283	50.14%	2	0.03%	-20	-0.31%	6,548
Roosevelt	1,417	77.77%	382	20.97%	23	1.26%	1,035	56.81%	1,822
San Juan	1,120	53.98%	941	45.35%	14	0.67%	179	8.63%	2,075
San Miguel	3,619	42.14%	4,966	57.82%	4	0.05%	-1,347	-15.68%	8,589
Sandoval	1,332	48.76%	1,398	51.17%	2	0.07%	-66	-2.42%	2,732
Santa Fe	3,888	50.96%	3,736	48.97%	5	0.07%	152	1.99%	7,629
Sierra	980	55.37%	790	44.63%	0	0.00%	190	10.73%	1,770
Socorro	1,827	50.01%	1,826	49.99%	0	0.00%	1	0.03%	3,653
Taos	2,250	50.53%	2,198	49.36%	5	0.11%	52	1.17%	4,453
Torrance	1,529	46.54%	1,750	53.27%	6	0.18%	-221	-6.73%	3,285
Union	1,869	58.24%	1,322	41.20%	18	0.56%	547	17.05%	3,209
Valencia	1,962	40.47%	2,880	59.41%	6	0.12%	-918	-18.94%	4,848
Total	62,789	53.17%	55,026	46.60%	278	0.24%	7,763	6.57%	118,093

==== Counties that flipped from Republican to Democratic ====
- Bernalillo
- Chaves
- Colfax
- Doña Ana
- Guadalupe
- Mora
- San Juan
- Santa Fe
- Sierra
- Socorro
- Taos
