= Governor Mechem =

Governor Mechem may refer to:

- Edwin L. Mechem (1912–2002), Governor of New Mexico
- Merritt C. Mechem (1870–1946), Governor of New Mexico

== See also ==
- Evan Mecham (1924–2008), Governor of Arizona
