= 1950 New Mexico gubernatorial election =

- November 7, 1950
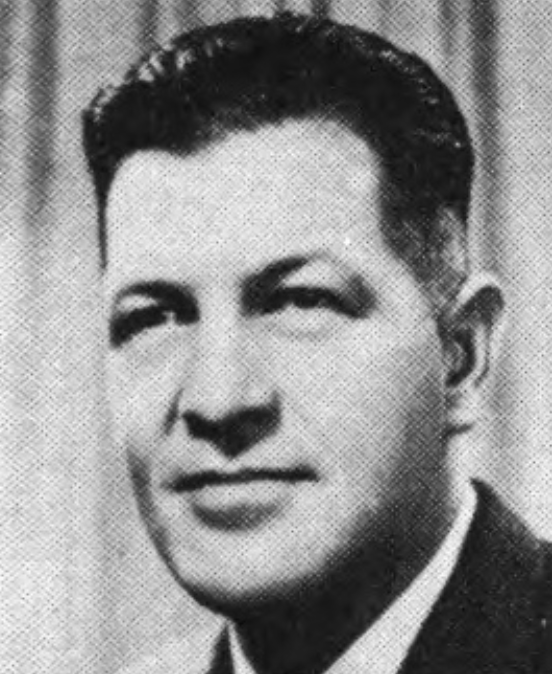

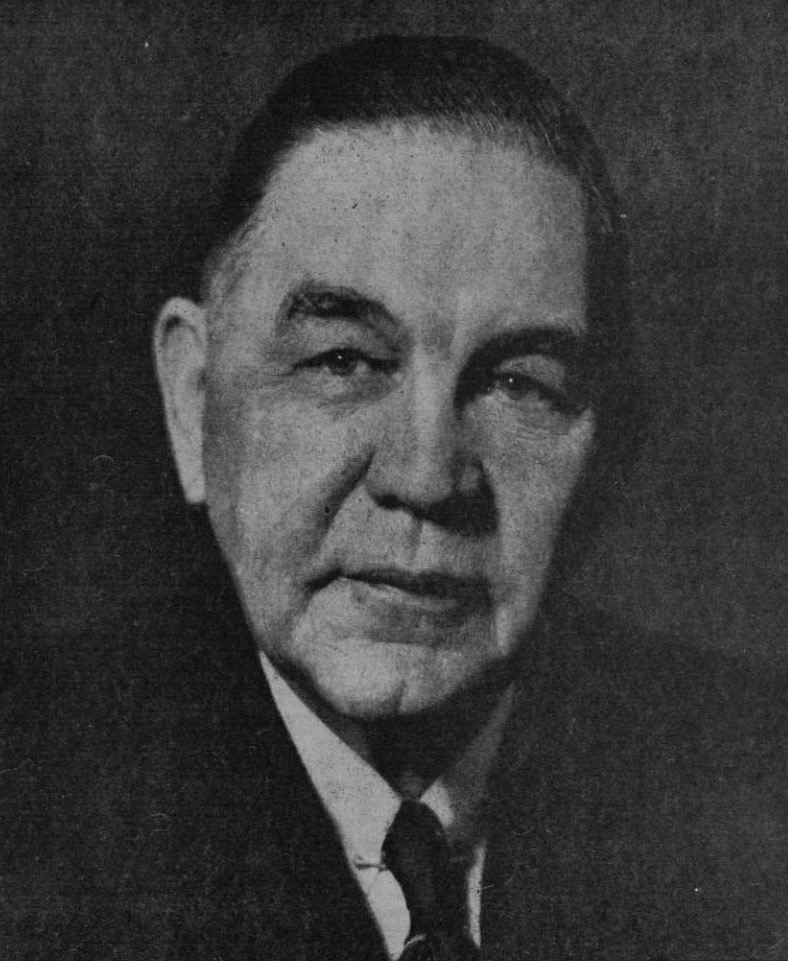
Nominee	Edwin L. Mechem	John E. Miles
Party	Republican	Democratic
Popular vote	96,846	83,359
Percentage	53.74%	46.26%
- County results Mechem: 50–60% 60–70% Miles: 50–60% 60–70%
Governor before election
Thomas J. Mabry
Democratic
Elected Governor
Edwin L. Mechem
Republican

The 1950 New Mexico gubernatorial election took place on November 7, 1950, in order to elect the Governor of New Mexico. Incumbent Democrat Thomas J. Mabry was term-limited, and could not run for a third consecutive term. David Chávez unsuccessfully sought the Democratic nomination.

Republican Edwin L. Mechem comfortably won the election, defeating former Democratic governor John E. Miles. Mechem, who is the nephew of former governor Merritt C. Mechem, became the first Republican to win a gubernatorial election in New Mexico since 1928, the first governor of the state to be born after New Mexican Statehood, and would later become only the second Republican governor to be elected twice, in 1952.

This was the first gubernatorial election ever in which Roosevelt County backed a Republican. Additionally, Grant County and Otero County voted Republican for the first time since 1920. No Republican candidate would carry the former again until 2014. Doña Ana County also voted Republican for the first time since 1928.

== Primary election ==
=== Democratic primary ===
1950 Democratic primary election
Party	Candidate	Votes	%
Democratic	John E. Miles	42,237	41.06%
Democratic	David Chávez	32,955	32.04%
Democratic	Lake J. Frazier	21,376	20.78%
Democratic	Ingram B. Pickett	6,295	6.12%
Total votes		102,863	100.00%

== General election ==
=== Results ===
1950 New Mexico gubernatorial election
Party	Candidate	Votes	%	±%
Republican	Edwin L. Mechem	96,846	53.74%	+8.46%
Democratic	John E. Miles	83,359	46.26%	−8.46%
Majority		13,487	7.48%	
Total votes		180,205	100.00%	
Republican gain from Democratic		Swing	+16.93%	

=== Results by county ===
County	Edwin L. Mechem Republican		John E. Miles Democratic		Margin		Total votes cast
County	#	%	#	%	#	%	Total votes cast
Bernalillo	22,241	61.91%	13,682	38.09%	8,559	23.83%	35,923
Catron	588	51.17%	561	48.83%	27	2.35%	1,149
Chaves	4,589	60.97%	2,938	39.03%	1,651	21.93%	7,527
Colfax	3,261	53.77%	2,804	46.23%	457	7.54%	6,065
Curry	3,169	49.93%	3,178	50.07%	-9	-0.14%	6,347
De Baca	628	49.06%	652	50.94%	-24	-1.88%	1,280
Doña Ana	5,679	63.21%	3,305	36.79%	2,374	26.42%	8,984
Eddy	3,622	40.83%	5,250	59.17%	-1,628	-18.35%	8,872
Grant	3,249	54.91%	2,668	45.09%	581	9.82%	5,917
Guadalupe	1,401	49.93%	1,405	50.07%	-4	-0.14%	2,806
Harding	701	58.56%	496	41.44%	205	17.13%	1,197
Hidalgo	415	38.60%	660	61.40%	-245	-22.79%	1,075
Lea	1,974	43.34%	2,581	56.66%	-607	-13.33%	4,555
Lincoln	1,546	55.75%	1,227	44.25%	319	11.50%	2,773
Los Alamos	1,343	68.45%	619	31.55%	724	36.90%	1,962
Luna	1,261	48.50%	1,339	51.50%	-78	-3.00%	2,600
McKinley	1,166	34.35%	2,228	65.65%	-1,062	-31.29%	3,394
Mora	1,789	53.18%	1,575	46.82%	214	6.36%	3,364
Otero	1,586	50.85%	1,533	49.15%	53	1.70%	3,119
Quay	1,961	47.48%	2,169	52.52%	-208	-5.04%	4,130
Rio Arriba	4,108	47.66%	4,512	52.34%	-404	-4.69%	8,620
Roosevelt	2,081	54.56%	1,733	45.44%	348	9.12%	3,814
San Juan	2,177	62.02%	1,333	37.98%	844	24.05%	3,510
San Miguel	4,536	49.92%	4,551	50.08%	-15	-0.17%	9,087
Sandoval	1,502	48.30%	1,608	51.70%	-106	-3.41%	3,110
Santa Fe	7,110	51.31%	6,747	48.69%	363	2.62%	13,857
Sierra	1,778	58.22%	1,276	41.78%	502	16.44%	3,054
Socorro	1,854	49.35%	1,903	50.65%	-49	-1.30%	3,757
Taos	2,598	46.50%	2,989	53.50%	-391	-7.00%	5,587
Torrance	1,877	56.55%	1,442	43.45%	435	13.11%	3,319
Union	1,629	57.89%	1,185	42.11%	444	15.78%	2,814
Valencia	3,427	51.63%	3,210	48.37%	217	3.27%	6,637
Total	96,846	53.74%	83,359	46.26%	13,487	7.48%	180,205

==== Counties that flipped from Democratic to Republican ====
- Catron
- Chaves
- Colfax
- Doña Ana
- Grant
- Otero
- Roosevelt
- Sierra
- Union

==== Counties that flipped from Republican to Democratic ====
- Guadalupe
- Rio Arriba
- San Miguel
- Sandoval
- Socorro
- Taos
