= 1922 New Mexico gubernatorial election =

- November 7, 1922
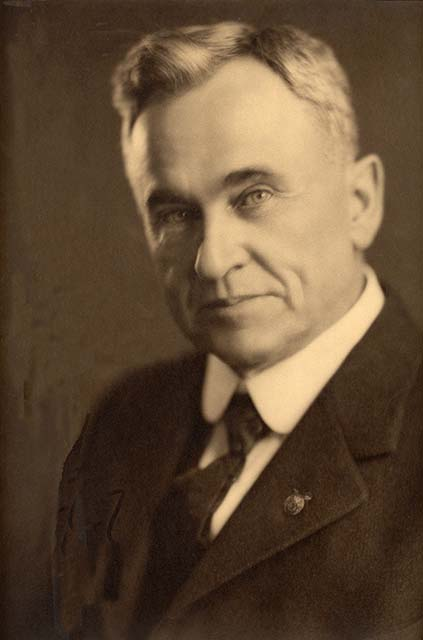

Nominee	James F. Hinkle	Charles Lee Hill
Party	Democratic	Republican
Popular vote	60,317	49,363
Percentage	54.57%	44.66%
- County results Hinkle: 50–60% 60–70% 70–80% 80–90% Hill: 40–50% 50–60% 70–80%
Governor before election
Merritt C. Mechem
Republican
Elected Governor
James F. Hinkle
Democratic

The 1922 New Mexico gubernatorial election was held on November 7, 1922. Democratic candidate James F. Hinkle defeated Republican nominee Charles Lee Hill with 54.57% of the vote. McKinley County, Socorro County, and Torrance County all backed a Democratic gubernatorial candidate for the first time ever in this election; the latter would not do so again until 1936.

== General election ==
=== Candidates ===
- James F. Hinkle, Democratic, businessman and former state senator
- Charles Lee Hill, Republican, dentist

=== Results ===
1922 New Mexico gubernatorial election
Party	Candidate	Votes	%	±%
Democratic	James F. Hinkle	60,317	54.57%	+6.77%
Republican	Charles Lee Hill	49,363	44.66%	−6.60%
Farmer–Labor	T. S. Smith	857	0.78%	−0.17%
Majority		10,954	9.91%	
Total votes		110,537	100.00%	
Democratic gain from Republican		Swing	+13.37%	

=== Results by county ===
County	James F. Hinkle Democratic		Charles Lee Hill Republican		T. S. Smith Farmer-Labor		Margin		Total votes cast
County	#	%	#	%	#	%	#	%	Total votes cast
Bernalillo	7,050	62.01%	4,293	37.76%	27	0.24%	2,757	24.25%	11,370
Catron	626	50.24%	583	46.79%	37	2.97%	43	3.45%	1,246
Chaves	2,584	73.72%	898	25.62%	23	0.66%	1,686	48.10%	3,505
Colfax	3,703	53.37%	3,180	45.83%	56	0.81%	523	7.54%	6,939
Curry	2,787	79.61%	635	18.14%	79	2.26%	2,152	61.47%	3,501
De Baca	819	67.57%	377	31.11%	16	1.32%	442	36.47%	1,212
Doña Ana	2,306	49.39%	2,350	50.33%	13	0.28%	-44	-0.94%	4,669
Eddy	1,779	75.77%	534	22.74%	35	1.49%	1,245	53.02%	2,348
Grant	2,530	62.52%	1,486	36.72%	31	0.77%	1,044	25.80%	4,047
Guadalupe	1,539	49.66%	1,553	50.11%	7	0.23%	-14	-0.45%	3,099
Harding	1,072	52.70%	939	46.17%	23	1.13%	133	6.54%	2,034
Hidalgo	688	66.80%	339	32.91%	3	0.29%	349	33.88%	1,030
Lea	870	89.69%	93	9.59%	7	0.72%	777	80.10%	970
Lincoln	1,450	52.48%	1,291	46.72%	22	0.80%	159	5.75%	2,763
Luna	925	65.28%	477	33.66%	15	1.06%	448	31.62%	1,417
McKinley	1,653	55.79%	1,302	43.94%	8	0.27%	351	11.85%	2,963
Mora	2,449	54.41%	2,048	45.50%	4	0.09%	401	8.91%	4,501
Otero	1,393	63.43%	737	33.56%	66	3.01%	656	29.87%	2,196
Quay	2,194	71.93%	788	25.84%	68	2.23%	1,406	46.10%	3,050
Rio Arriba	2,524	42.69%	3,375	57.08%	14	0.24%	-851	-14.39%	5.913
Roosevelt	1.459	76.99%	387	20.42%	49	2.59%	1,072	56.57%	1,895
San Juan	965	60.09%	615	38.29%	26	1.62%	350	21.79%	1,606
San Miguel	3,587	40.40%	5,278	59.45%	13	0.15%	-1,691	-19.05%	8,878
Sandoval	1,084	47.40%	1,201	52.51%	2	0.09%	-117	-5.12%	2,287
Santa Fe	2,410	40.37%	3,549	59.45%	11	0.18%	-1,139	-19.08%	5,970
Sierra	768	49.52%	770	49.65%	13	0.84%	-2	-0.13%	1,551
Socorro	2,047	51.81%	1,895	47.96%	9	0.23%	152	3.85%	3,951
Taos	1,780	41.48%	2,500	58.26%	11	0.26%	-720	-16.78%	4,291
Torrance	1,797	53.67%	1,450	43.31%	101	3.02%	347	10.36%	3,348
Union	2,575	57.79%	1,813	40.69%	68	1.53%	762	17.10%	4,456
Valencia	904	25.60%	2,627	74.40%	0	0.00%	-1,723	-48.80%	3,531
Total	60,317	54.57%	49,363	44.66%	857	0.78%	10,954	9.91%	110,537

==== Counties that flipped from Republican to Democratic ====
- Colfax
- Grant
- Lincoln
- McKinley
- Otero
- Socorro
- Torrance
- Union

== Bibliography ==
- Glashan, Roy R. (1979). American Governors and Gubernatorial Elections, 1775-1978. Meckler Books. ISBN 0-930466-17-9.
- Guide to U.S. Elections. Vol. II. Washington, D.C.: CQ Press. 2005. ISBN 9781568029818.
- Issued by Mrs. Soledad Chacon, Secretary of State (1923). The New Mexico Blue Book or State Official Register 1923-24. Santa Fe, N.M.: Thos. Hughes, Printer, Albuquerque.
