= 1924 New Mexico gubernatorial election =

- November 4, 1924
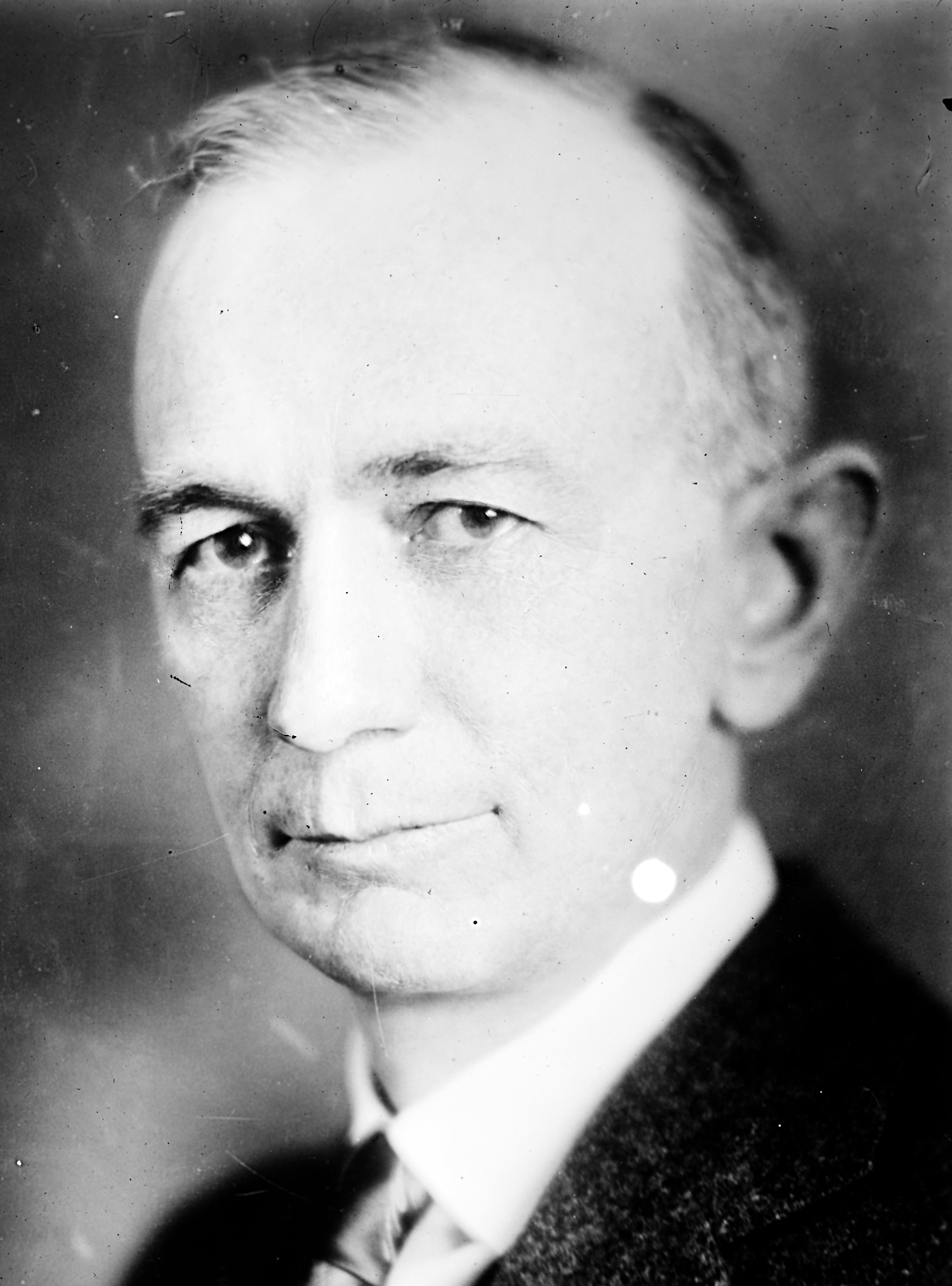

Nominee	Arthur T. Hannett	Manuel B. Otero
Party	Democratic	Republican
Popular vote	56,183	55,984
Percentage	48.82%	48.64%
- County results Hannett: 50–60% 60–70% 70–80% 80–90% Otero: 50–60% 60–70% 80–90%
Governor before election
James F. Hinkle
Democratic
Elected Governor
Arthur T. Hannett
Democratic

The 1924 New Mexico gubernatorial election was held on November 4, 1924.

Incumbent Democratic Governor James F. Hinkle did not run for a second term. Democratic nominee Arthur T. Hannett defeated Republican nominee Manuel B. Otero by 199 votes, or 0.17%, making this the closest gubernatorial election in New Mexico's history to date.

== General election ==
=== Candidates ===
- Arthur T. Hannett, Democratic, member of the State Highway Commission
- Manuel B. Otero, Republican

=== Results ===
1924 New Mexico gubernatorial election
Party	Candidate	Votes	%	±%
Democratic	Arthur T. Hannett	56,183	48.82%	−5.75%
Republican	Manuel B. Otero	55,984	48.64%	+3.98%
Progressive Party (United States, 1924)	Green B. Patterson	2,926	2.54%	
Majority		199	0.17%	
Total votes		115,093	100.00%	
Democratic hold		Swing	-9.74%	

=== Results by county ===
County	Arthur T. Hannett Democratic		Manuel B. Otero Republican		Green B. Patterson Progressive		Margin		Total votes cast
County	#	%	#	%	#	%	#	%	Total votes cast
Bernalillo	6,532	45.20%	7,785	53.88%	133	0.92%	-1,253	-8.67%	14,450
Catron	461	43.61%	546	51.66%	50	4.73%	-85	-8.04%	1,057
Chaves	2,443	63.50%	1,301	33.82%	103	2.68%	1,142	29.69%	3,847
Colfax	3,801	52.33%	3,298	45.41%	164	2.26%	503	6.93%	7,263
Curry	2,185	66.98%	563	17.26%	514	15.76%	1,622	49.72%	3,262
De Baca	689	66.96%	322	31.29%	18	1.75%	367	35.67%	1,029
Doña Ana	2,121	43.79%	2,641	54.52%	82	1.69%	-520	-10.73%	4,844
Eddy	1,670	72.26%	579	25.05%	62	2.68%	1,091	47.21%	2,311
Grant	2,754	61.69%	1,542	34.54%	168	3.76%	1,212	27.15%	4,464
Guadalupe	1,140	44.55%	1,369	53.50%	50	1.95%	-229	-8.95%	2,559
Harding	895	52.19%	748	43.62%	72	4.20%	147	8.57%	1,715
Hidalgo	607	65.27%	269	28.92%	54	5.81%	338	36.34%	930
Lea	607	83.49%	100	13.76%	20	2.75%	507	69.74%	727
Lincoln	1,029	46.90%	1,102	50.23%	63	2.87%	-73	-3.33%	2,194
Luna	858	52.16%	692	42.07%	95	5.78%	166	10.09%	1,645
McKinley	1,669	51.35%	1,534	47.20%	47	1.45%	135	4.15%	3,250
Mora	2,029	47.23%	2,266	52.75%	1	0.02%	-237	-5.52%	4,296
Otero	1,022	50.57%	851	42.11%	148	7.32%	171	8.46%	2,021
Quay	2,167	70.72%	739	24.12%	158	5.16%	1,428	46.61%	3,064
Rio Arriba	2,884	40.85%	4,141	58.65%	35	0.50%	-1,257	-17.80%	7,060
Roosevelt	1,610	78.69%	299	14.61%	137	6.70%	1,311	64.08%	2,046
San Juan	1,332	67.24%	543	27.41%	106	5.35%	789	39.83%	1,981
San Miguel	4,279	48.25%	4,550	51.31%	39	0.44%	-271	-3.06%	8,868
Sandoval	1,084	38.20%	1,741	61.35%	13	0.46%	-657	-23.15%	2,838
Santa Fe	2,691	39.39%	4,124	60.36%	17	0.25%	-1,433	-20.97%	6,832
Sierra	590	45.88%	664	51.63%	32	2.49%	-74	-5.75%	1,286
Socorro	1,107	29.73%	2,596	69.71%	21	0.56%	-1,489	-39.98%	3,724
Taos	1,503	35.48%	2,706	63.88%	27	0.64%	-1,203	-28.40%	4,236
Torrance	1,477	45.64%	1,648	50.93%	111	3.43%	-171	-5.28%	3,236
Union	2,150	55.80%	1,330	34.52%	373	9.68%	820	21.28%	3,853
Valencia	797	18.95%	3,395	80.74%	13	0.31%	-2,598	61.78%	4,205
Total	56,183	48.82%	55,984	48.64%	2,926	2.54%	199	0.17%	115,093

==== Counties that flipped from Democratic to Republican ====
- Bernalillo
- Catron
- Lincoln
- Mora
- Socorro
- Torrance

== Bibliography ==
- Glashan, Roy R. (1979). American Governors and Gubernatorial Elections, 1775-1978. Meckler Books. ISBN 0-930466-17-9.
- Guide to U.S. Elections. Vol. II. Washington, D.C.: CQ Press. 2005. ISBN 9781568029818.
