= 1928 New Mexico gubernatorial election =

- November 6, 1928
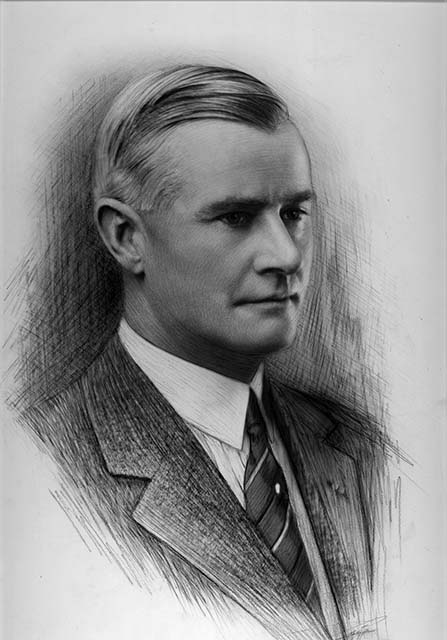

| Nominee | Richard C. Dillon | Robert C. Dow |
| Party | Republican | Democratic |
| Popular vote | 65,967 | 52,550 |
| Percentage | 55.61% | 44.30% |
- County results Dillon: 50–60% 60–70% 70–80% Dow: 50–60% 60–70% 70–80%
Governor before election
Richard C. Dillon
Republican
Elected Governor
Richard C. Dillon
Republican

The 1928 New Mexico gubernatorial election took place on November 6, 1928, in order to elect the Governor of New Mexico. Incumbent Republican Richard C. Dillon won a second term by a wide margin, becoming the first governor of New Mexico to be reelected. Dillon was the first Republican gubernatorial candidate to ever win Chaves County and San Juan County. Conversely, this was the last election until 1950 in which Doña Ana County backed a Republican and the last until 1940 in which Bernalillo County did the same.

== General election ==
=== Results ===
1928 New Mexico gubernatorial election
| Party | Candidate | Votes | % | ±% |
|---|---|---|---|---|
| Republican | Richard C. Dillon (incumbent) | 65,967 | 55.61% | +4.01% |
| Democratic | Robert C. Dow | 52,550 | 44.30% | −3.84% |
| Workers | John W. Blackburn | 99 | 0.08% | |
| Majority | | 13,417 | 11.31% | |
| Total votes | | 118,616 | 100.00% | |
| Republican hold | | Swing | +7.85% | |

=== Results by county ===
| County | Richard C. Dillon Republican | | Robert C. Dow Democratic | | John W. Blackburn Workers | | Margin | | Total votes cast |
| County | # | % | # | % | # | % | # | % | Total votes cast |
|---|---|---|---|---|---|---|---|---|---|
| Bernalillo | 7,736 | 50.41% | 7,601 | 49.53% | 8 | 0.05% | 135 | 0.88% | 15,345 |
| Catron | 689 | 56.75% | 524 | 43.16% | 1 | 0.08% | 165 | 13.59% | 1,214 |
| Chaves | 2,682 | 59.34% | 1,831 | 40.51% | 7 | 0.15% | 851 | 18.83% | 4,520 |
| Colfax | 3,680 | 52.92% | 3,266 | 46.97% | 8 | 0.12% | 414 | 5.95% | 6,954 |
| Curry | 1,408 | 39.07% | 2,192 | 60.82% | 4 | 0.11% | -784 | -21.75% | 3,604 |
| De Baca | 430 | 42.36% | 583 | 57.44% | 2 | 0.20% | -153 | -15.07% | 1,015 |
| Doña Ana | 3,076 | 58.03% | 2,217 | 41.82% | 8 | 0.15% | 859 | 16.20% | 5,301 |
| Eddy | 1,339 | 47.21% | 1,494 | 52.68% | 3 | 0.11% | -155 | -5.47% | 2,836 |
| Grant | 1,833 | 44.87% | 2,247 | 55.01% | 5 | 0.12% | -414 | -10.13% | 4,085 |
| Guadalupe | 1,686 | 60.06% | 1,121 | 39.94% | 0 | 0.00% | 565 | 20.13% | 2,807 |
| Harding | 822 | 49.40% | 841 | 50.54% | 1 | 0.06% | -19 | -1.14% | 1,664 |
| Hidalgo | 444 | 41.07% | 636 | 58.83% | 1 | 0.09% | -192 | -17.76% | 1,081 |
| Lea | 291 | 28.59% | 723 | 71.02% | 4 | 0.39% | -432 | -42.44% | 1,018 |
| Lincoln | 1,357 | 58.12% | 975 | 41.76% | 3 | 0.13% | 382 | 16.36% | 2,335 |
| Luna | 980 | 60.53% | 637 | 39.35% | 2 | 0.12% | 343 | 21.19% | 1,619 |
| McKinley | 1,896 | 56.75% | 1,439 | 43.07% | 6 | 0.18% | 457 | 13.68% | 3,341 |
| Mora | 2,038 | 53.74% | 1,754 | 46.26% | 0 | 0.00% | 284 | 7.49% | 3,792 |
| Otero | 1,152 | 47.56% | 1,258 | 51.94% | 12 | 0.50% | -106 | -4.38% | 2,422 |
| Quay | 1,406 | 41.22% | 2,003 | 58.72% | 2 | 0.06% | -597 | -17.50% | 3,411 |
| Rio Arriba | 4,255 | 65.10% | 2,279 | 34.87% | 2 | 0.03% | 1,976 | 30.23% | 6,536 |
| Roosevelt | 678 | 30.29% | 1,552 | 69.35% | 8 | 0.36% | -874 | -39.05% | 2,238 |
| San Juan | 1,192 | 54.88% | 980 | 45.12% | 0 | 0.00% | 212 | 9.76% | 2,172 |
| San Miguel | 5,596 | 64.17% | 3,125 | 35.83% | 0 | 0.00% | 2,471 | 28.33% | 8,721 |
| Sandoval | 1,761 | 61.36% | 1,108 | 38.61% | 1 | 0.03% | 653 | 22.75% | 2,870 |
| Santa Fe | 5,103 | 66.54% | 2,560 | 33.38% | 6 | 0.08% | 2,543 | 33.16% | 7,669 |
| Sierra | 741 | 51.85% | 688 | 48.15% | 0 | 0.00% | 53 | 3.71% | 1,429 |
| Socorro | 2,127 | 60.75% | 1,374 | 39.25% | 0 | 0.00% | 753 | 21.51% | 3,501 |
| Taos | 2,584 | 60.40% | 1,694 | 39.60% | 0 | 0.00% | 890 | 20.80% | 4,278 |
| Torrance | 1,851 | 60.14% | 1,223 | 39.73% | 4 | 0.13% | 628 | 20.40% | 3,078 |
| Union | 1,672 | 49.73% | 1,690 | 50.27% | 0 | 0.00% | -18 | -0.54% | 3,362 |
| Valencia | 3,462 | 78.72% | 935 | 21.26% | 1 | 0.02% | 2,527 | 57.46% | 4,398 |
| Total | 65,967 | 55.61% | 52,550 | 44.30% | 99 | 0.08% | 13,417 | 11.31% | 118,616 |

==== Counties that flipped from Democratic to Republican ====
- Chaves
- Colfax
- San Juan
- Sierra
