= List of mayors of Roswell, New Mexico =

Mayors of the city of Roswell, New Mexico, USA

The following is a list of mayors of the city of Roswell, New Mexico, USA. Roswell is in Chaves County.

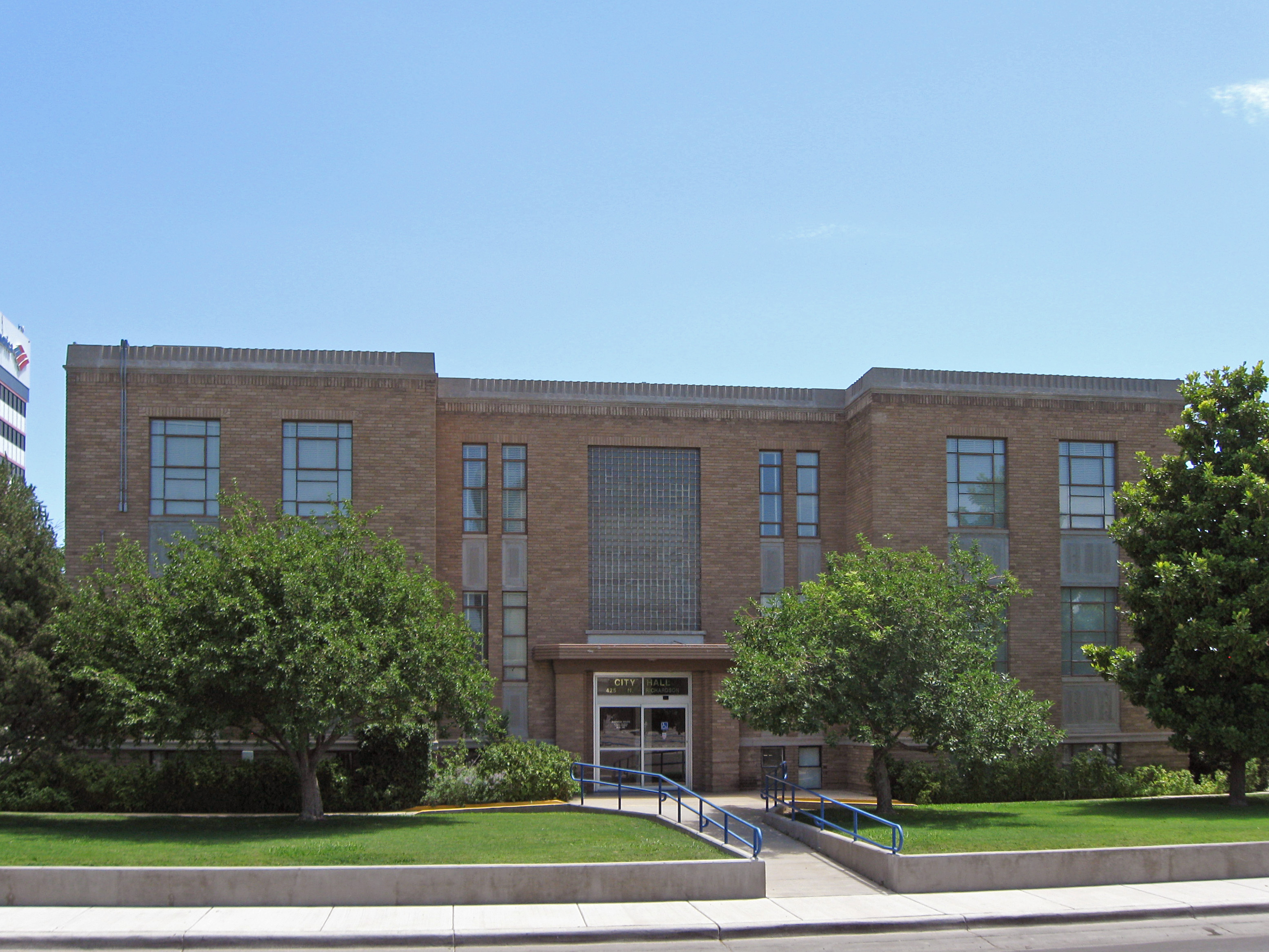
Roswell City Hall building in New Mexico, US, in 2009

== Mayors ==
- Joseph Calloway Lea, 1841-1904
- James F. Hinkle, 1904-1905
- J.W. Stockard, ca.1907
- George T. Veal, ca.1910-1912
- A.H. Pruitt, ca.1926
- Lake J. Frazier, 1948-1951
- Warren Cobean, ca. 1953-1954
- Bert M. Ballard, 1955-1960
- Bill B. Owen, ca.2004
- Sam D. LaGrone, ca.2007-2009
- Del Jurney, ca.2010-2014
- Dennis J. Kintigh, ca.2014-2018
- Timothy Jennings, 2022–present

== See also ==
- Roswell history
