= James F. Hinkle =

6th Governor of New Mexico

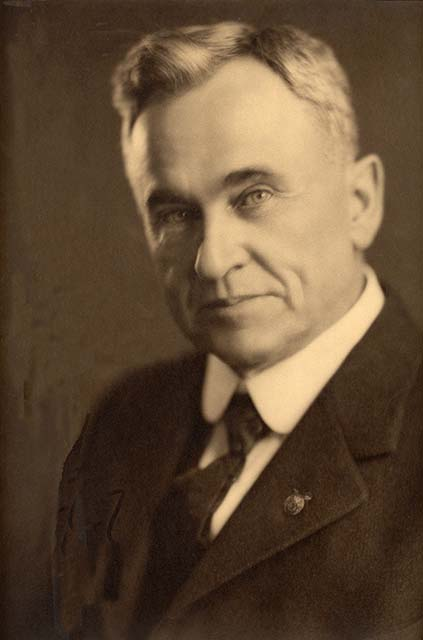

6th Governor of New Mexico
- In office January 1, 1923 – January 1, 1925
- Lieutenant: Vacant; Jose A. Baca
- Preceded by: Merritt C. Mechem
- Succeeded by: Arthur T. Hannett

Member of the New Mexico Senate
- In office 1912–1917

8th New Mexico Commissioner of Public Lands
- In office 1931–1932
- Governor: Arthur Seligman
- Preceded by: Austin D. Crile
- Succeeded by: Frank Vesely

Personal details
- Born: October 20, 1862 Franklin County, Missouri, U.S.
- Died: March 26, 1951 (aged 88) Roswell, New Mexico, U.S.
- Party: Democratic
- Spouse: Lillie E. Roberts
- Profession: Banker, rancher

James Fielding Hinkle (October 20, 1862 – March 26, 1951) was an American banker, politician, and the sixth governor of New Mexico.

== Early life ==
Hinkle was born in Franklin County, Missouri on October 20, 1862. He studied at the University of Missouri. In 1885 he moved to New Mexico and established a successful business career.

== Politics ==
He served as a member of the Lincoln County Board of Commissioners from 1891 to 1893 and also served as a member of the New Mexico Territorial House of Representatives from 1893 to 1896. He became a member of the New Mexico Territorial Senate in 1901 and served as a member of the Lincoln County Board of Equalization from 1901 to 1911. He served as the mayor of Roswell from 1904 to 1906. He then served in the New Mexico State Senate from 1912 to 1917.

He was elected the Governor of New Mexico by a popular vote on November 7, 1922. During his term, a First World War veteran's property tax exemption was sanctioned. He was the Governor of New Mexico from January 1, 1923, to January 1, 1925.

Hinkle was later elected as New Mexico Commissioner of Public Lands in 1931 and served a single two-year term.

== Later years ==
After leaving the office, he remained active in business. He died in Roswell, New Mexico on March 26, 1951. In 1964, he was inducted into the Hall of Great Westerners of the National Cowboy & Western Heritage Museum for his contribution to the cattle industry.

== See also ==
- List of mayors of Roswell, New Mexico

Party political offices
| Preceded by Richard H. Hanna | Democratic nominee for Governor of New Mexico; 1922 | Succeeded by Arthur T. Hannett |
Political offices
| Preceded by Merritt C. Mechem | Governor of New Mexico; 1923–1925 | Succeeded by Arthur T. Hannett |
