= 1926 New Mexico gubernatorial election =

- November 2, 1926
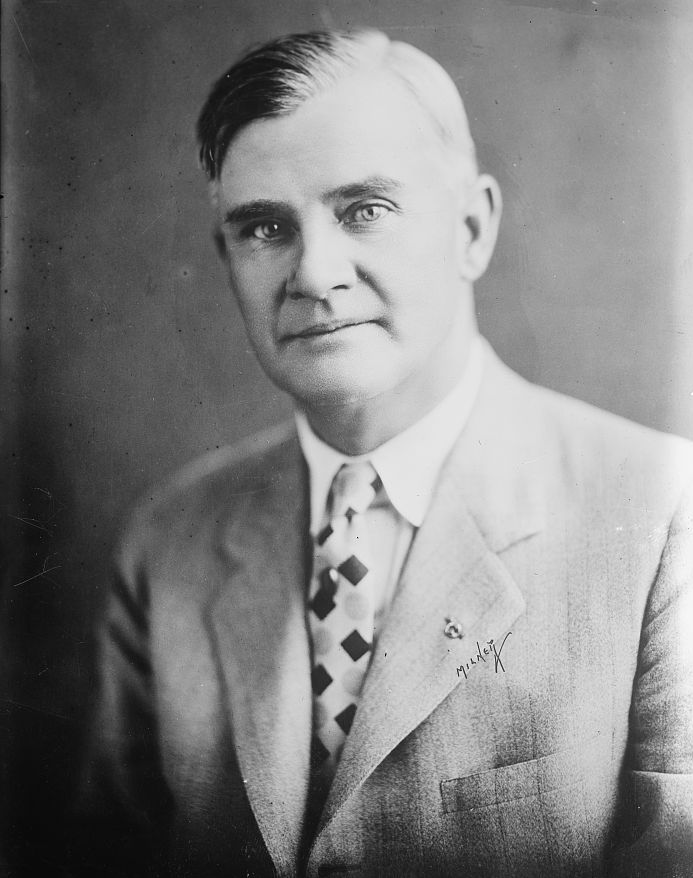

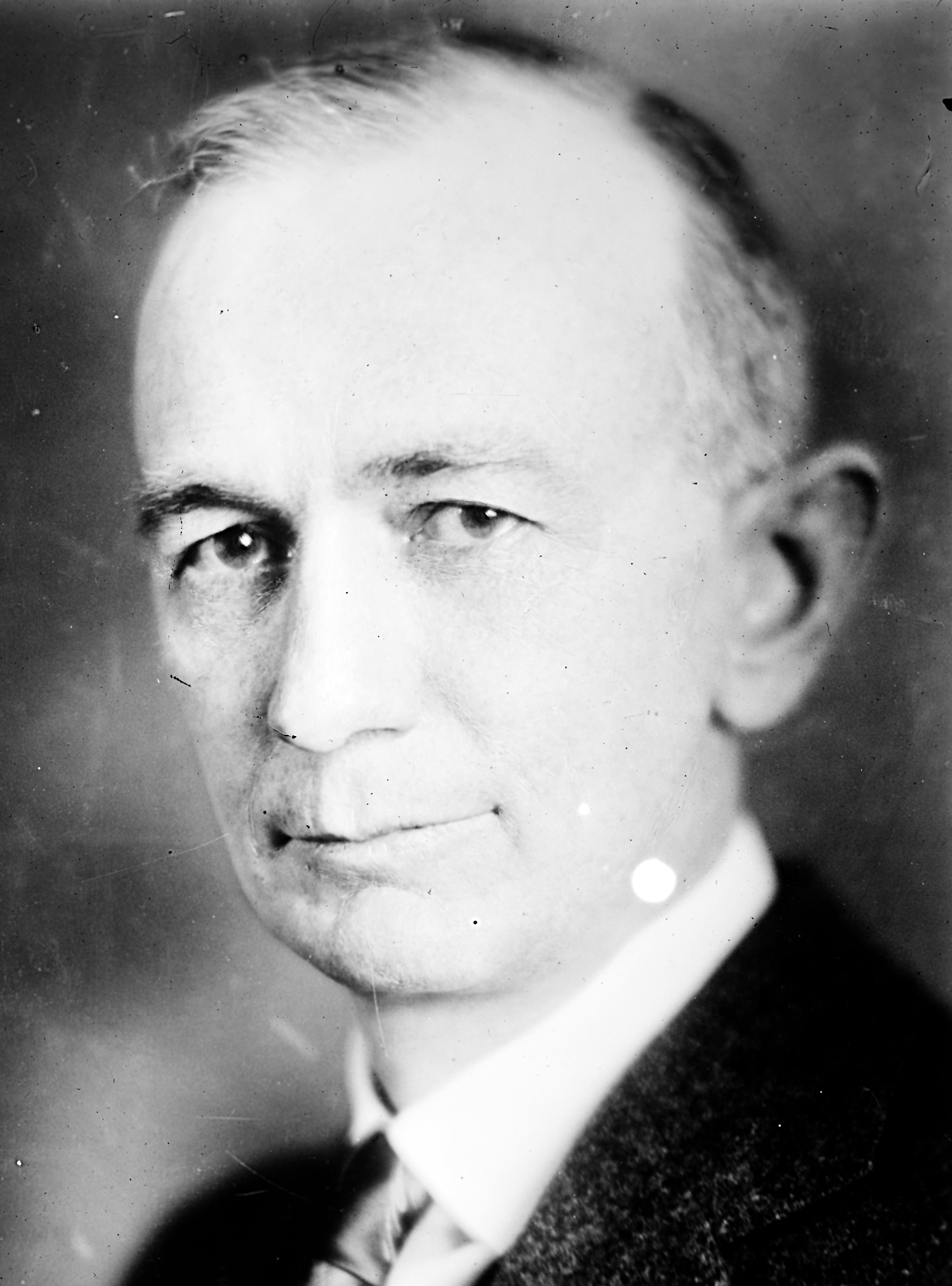
Nominee	Richard C. Dillon	Arthur T. Hannett
Party	Republican	Democratic
Popular vote	56,294	52,523
Percentage	51.60%	48.15%
- County results Dillon: 50–60% 60–70% 80–90% Hannett: 50–60% 60–70% 70–80% 80–90%
Governor before election
Arthur T. Hannett
Democratic
Elected Governor
Richard C. Dillon
Republican

The 1926 New Mexico gubernatorial election was held on November 2, 1926. Incumbent Democratic Governor Arthur T. Hannett was defeated by Republican nominee Richard C. Dillon who won 51.60% of the vote. This was the first ever gubernatorial election in which Luna County voted for a Republican candidate.

== General election ==
=== Candidates ===
- Arthur T. Hannett, Democratic, incumbent Governor
- Richard C. Dillon, Republican, State Senator

=== Results ===
1926 New Mexico gubernatorial election
Party	Candidate	Votes	%	±%
Republican	Richard C. Dillon	56,294	51.60%	+2.96%
Democratic	Arthur T. Hannett (incumbent)	52,523	48.15%	−0.67%
Socialist	Q. M. Bixler	274	0.25%	
Majority		3,771	3.46%	
Total votes		109,091	100.00%	
Republican gain from Democratic		Swing	+3.63%	

=== Results by county ===
County	Richard C. Dillon Republican		Arthur T. Hannett Democratic		Q. M. Bixler Socialist		Margin		Total votes cast
County	#	%	#	%	#	%	#	%	Total votes cast
Bernalillo	7,426	55.12%	6,032	44.77%	14	0.10%	1,394	10.35%	13,472
Catron	601	50.42%	591	49.58%	0	0.00%	10	0.84%	1,192
Chaves	1,408	40.45%	2,055	59.03%	18	0.52%	-647	-18.59%	3,481
Colfax	2,915	47.64%	3,179	51.95%	25	0.41%	-264	-4.31%	6,119
Curry	391	16.61%	1,963	83.39%	0	0.00%	-1,572	-66.78%	2,354
De Baca	390	39.96%	582	59.63%	4	0.41%	-192	-19.67%	976
Doña Ana	3,108	53.08%	2,729	46.61%	18	0.31%	379	6.47%	5,855
Eddy	558	21.73%	2,001	77.92%	9	0.35%	-1,443	-56.19%	2,568
Grant	1,429	37.33%	2,390	62.43%	9	0.24%	-961	-25.10%	3,828
Guadalupe	1,510	60.06%	998	39.70%	6	0.24%	512	20.37%	2,514
Harding	790	47.85%	857	51.91%	4	0.24%	-67	-4.06%	1,651
Hidalgo	269	29.76%	634	70.13%	1	0.11%	-365	-40.38%	904
Lea	108	13.90%	668	85.97%	1	0.13%	-560	-72.07%	777
Lincoln	1,139	53.83%	974	46.03%	3	0.14%	165	7.80%	2,116
Luna	829	50.49%	801	48.78%	12	0.73%	28	1.71%	1,642
McKinley	1,404	51.81%	1,305	48.15%	1	0.04%	99	3.65%	2,710
Mora	2,139	54.58%	1,780	45.42%	0	0.00%	359	9.16%	3,919
Otero	815	46.52%	923	52.68%	14	0.80%	-108	-6.16%	1,752
Quay	794	29.91%	1,840	69.30%	21	0.79%	-1,046	-39.40%	2,655
Rio Arriba	4,362	63.99%	2,451	35.95%	4	0.06%	1,911	28.03%	6,817
Roosevelt	285	15.55%	1,531	83.52%	17	0.93%	-1,246	-67.98%	1,833
San Juan	685	34.84%	1,273	64.75%	8	0.41%	-588	-29.91%	1,966
San Miguel	4,417	51.39%	4,170	48.52%	8	0.09%	247	2.87%	8,595
Sandoval	1,677	58.76%	1,176	41.21%	1	0.04%	501	17.55%	2,854
Santa Fe	4,576	66.77%	2,267	33.08%	10	0.15%	2,309	33.69%	6,853
Sierra	695	49.57%	707	50.43%	0	0.00%	-12	-0.86%	1,402
Socorro	2,567	67.71%	1,224	32.29%	0	0.00%	1,343	35.43%	3,791
Taos	2,506	58.72%	1,758	41.19%	4	0.09%	748	17.53%	4,268
Torrance	1,705	58.94%	1,180	40.79%	8	0.28%	525	18.15%	2,893
Union	1,344	42.64%	1,760	55.84%	48	1.52%	-416	-13.20%	3,152
Valencia	3,452	82.54%	724	17.31%	6	0.14%	2,728	65.23%	4,182
Total	56,294	51.60%	52,523	48.15%	274	0.25%	3,771	3.46%	109,091

==== Counties that flipped from Democratic to Republican ====
- Luna
- McKinley

==== Counties that flipped from Republican to Democratic ====
- Sierra

== Bibliography ==
- Glashan, Roy R. (1979). American Governors and Gubernatorial Elections, 1775-1978. Meckler Books. ISBN 0-930466-17-9.
- Guide to U.S. Elections. Vol. II. Washington, D.C.: CQ Press. 2005. ISBN 9781568029818.
