= 1932 New Mexico gubernatorial election =

- November 8, 1932
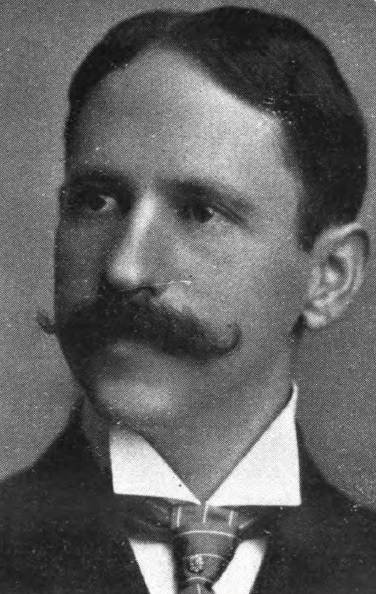

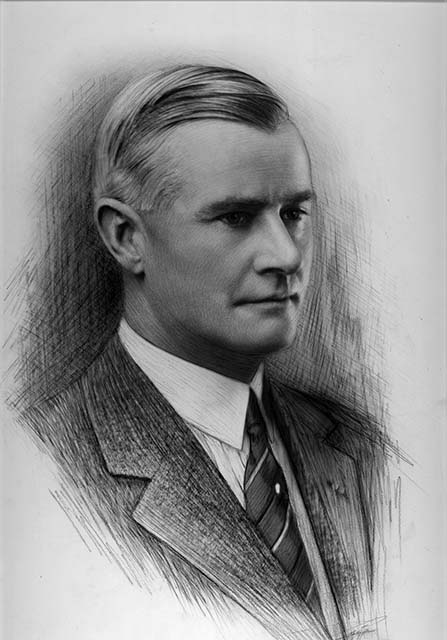
Nominee	Arthur Seligman	Richard C. Dillon
Party	Democratic	Republican
Popular vote	83,612	67,406
Percentage	54.81%	44.19%
- County results Seligman: 40–50% 50–60% 60–70% 70–80% Dillon: 50–60% 60–70%
Governor before election
Arthur Seligman
Democratic
Elected Governor
Arthur Seligman
Democratic

The 1932 New Mexico gubernatorial election took place on November 8, 1932, in order to elect the Governor of New Mexico. Incumbent Democrat Arthur Seligman won reelection to a second term. This was the first gubernatorial election in which Rio Arriba County voted for a Democrat. Seligman was the last Democrat until Jack M. Campbell in 1964 to carry Mora County.

== General election ==
=== Results ===
1932 New Mexico gubernatorial election
Party	Candidate	Votes	%	±%
Democratic	Arthur Seligman (incumbent)	83,612	54.81%	+1.65%
Republican	Richard C. Dillon	67,406	44.19%	−2.41%
Socialist	E. R. Frost	1,062	0.70%	+0.46%
Liberty	Thomas E. Cullender	344	0.23%	
Communist	W. F. Richardson	112	0.07%	
Majority		16,206	10.62%	
Total votes		152,536	100.00%	
Democratic hold		Swing	+4.05%	

=== Results by county ===
County	Arthur Seligman Democratic		Richard C. Dillon Republican		E. R. Frost Socialist		Thomas E. Cullender Liberty		W. F. Richardson Communist		Margin		Total votes cast
County	#	%	#	%	#	%	#	%	#	%	#	%	Total votes cast
Bernalillo	10,020	54.71%	8,223	44.90%	52	0.28%	0	0.00%	20	0.11%	1,797	9.81%	18.315
Catron	804	49.60%	795	49.04%	16	0.99%	0	0.00%	6	0.37%	9	0.56%	1,621
Chaves	3,540	54.62%	2,719	41.95%	29	0.45%	167	2.58%	26	0.40%	821	12.67%	6,481
Colfax	3,663	48.24%	3,910	51.49%	20	0.26%	0	0.00%	1	0.01%	-247	-3.25%	7,594
Curry	3,302	64.12%	1,522	29.55%	319	6.19%	1	0.02%	6	0.12%	1,780	34.56%	5,150
De Baca	945	70.95%	373	28.00%	10	0.75%	2	0.15%	2	0.15%	572	42.94%	1,332
Doña Ana	4,307	57.14%	3,182	42.22%	44	0.58%	3	0.04%	1	0.01%	1,125	14.93%	7,537
Eddy	3,215	71.46%	1,235	27.45%	42	0.93%	6	0.13%	1	0.02%	1,980	44.01%	4,499
Grant	3,048	62.99%	1,749	36.14%	33	0.68%	2	0.04%	7	0.14%	1,299	26.84%	4,839
Guadalupe	1,740	49.22%	1,790	50.64%	5	0.14%	0	0.00%	0	0.00%	-50	-1.41%	3,535
Harding	1,126	49.34%	1,141	50.00%	15	0.66%	0	0.00%	0	0.00%	-15	-0.66%	2,282
Hidalgo	1,004	67.75%	464	31.31%	12	0.81%	2	0.13%	0	0.00%	540	36.44%	1,482
Lea	1,952	69.99%	740	26.53%	77	2.76%	20	0.72%	0	0.00%	1,212	43.46%	2,789
Lincoln	1,839	53.74%	1,570	45.88%	9	0.26%	2	0.06%	2	0.06%	269	7.86%	3,422
Luna	1,231	53.13%	1,069	46.14%	16	0.69%	0	0.00%	1	0.04%	162	6.99%	2,317
McKinley	2,104	60.34%	1,368	39.23%	8	0.23%	2	0.06%	5	0.14%	736	21.11%	3,487
Mora	2,104	63.45%	1,611	36.53%	0	0.00%	0	0.00%	1	0.02%	1,187	26.92%	4,410
Otero	1,895	59.93%	1,214	38.39%	45	1.42%	0	0.00%	8	0.25%	681	21.54%	3,162
Quay	2,507	60.44%	1,539	37.10%	99	2.39%	1	0.02%	2	0.05%	968	23.34%	4,148
Rio Arriba	4,842	58.91%	3,369	40.99%	4	0.05%	0	0.00%	5	0.06%	1,473	17.92%	8,220
Roosevelt	2,442	67.95%	1,105	30.75%	43	1.20%	1	0.03%	3	0.08%	1,337	37.20%	3,594
San Juan	1,300	48.87%	1,196	44.96%	31	1.17%	130	4.89%	3	0.11%	104	3.91%	2,660
San Miguel	4,372	41.83%	6,068	58.05%	9	0.09%	0	0.00%	4	0.04%	-1,696	-16.23%	10,453
Sandoval	1,687	49.65%	1,708	50.26%	2	0.06%	0	0.00%	1	0.03%	-21	-0.62%	3,398
Santa Fe	5,190	54.93%	4,249	44.97%	8	0.08%	1	0.01%	0	0.00%	941	9.96%	9,448
Sierra	1,162	52.70%	1,021	46.30%	21	0.95%	1	0.05%	0	0.00%	141	6.39%	2,205
Socorro	2,319	52.23%	2,113	47.59%	7	0.16%	0	0.00%	1	0.02%	206	4.64%	4,440
Taos	2,898	50.53%	2,822	49.21%	14	0.24%	0	0.00%	1	0.02%	76	1.33%	5,735
Torrance	1,709	42.18%	2,309	56.98%	32	0.79%	0	0.00%	2	0.05%	-600	-14.81%	4,052
Union	2,516	57.04%	1,858	42.12%	33	0.75%	2	0.05%	2	0.05%	658	14.92%	4,411
Valencia	2,135	38.69%	3,374	61.15%	7	0.13%	1	0.02%	1	0.02%	-1,239	-22.45%	5,518
Total	83,612	54.81%	67,406	44.19%	1,062	0.70%	344	0.23%	112	0.07%	16,206	10.62%	152,536

==== Counties that flipped from Republican to Democratic ====
- Catron
- Lincoln
- Luna
- McKinley
- Rio Arriba

==== Counties that flipped from Democratic to Republican ====
- Colfax
- Guadalupe
- Harding
