= Clyde Tingley =

11th Governor of New Mexico

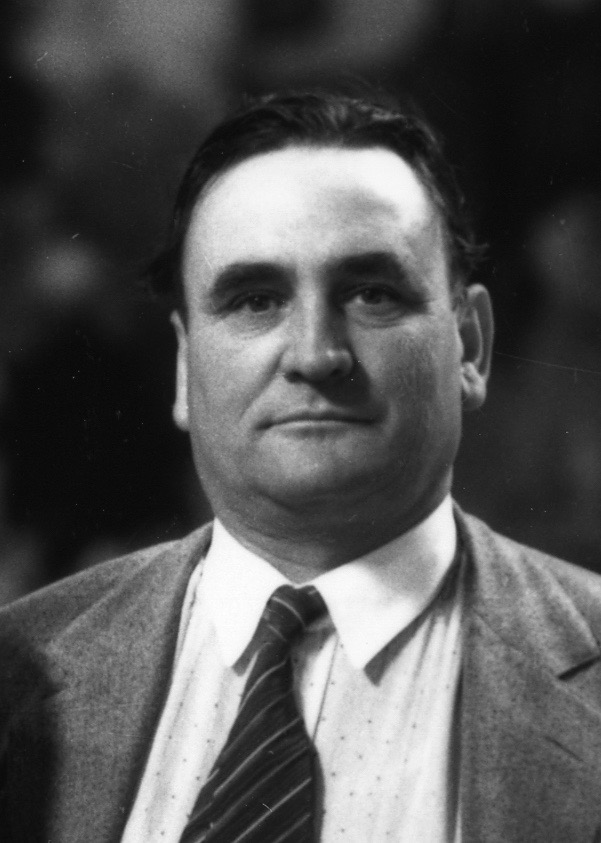

11th Governor of New Mexico
- In office January 1, 1935 – January 1, 1939
- Lieutenant: Louis Cabeza de Baca; Hiram M. Dow
- Preceded by: Andrew W. Hockenhull
- Succeeded by: John E. Miles

Personal details
- Born: January 5, 1881 London, Ohio, U.S.
- Died: December 24, 1960 (aged 79) Albuquerque, New Mexico, U.S.
- Party: Democratic
- Spouse: Carrie Wooster
- Profession: Attorney

Clyde Kendle Tingley (January 5, 1881 – December 24, 1960) was an American lawyer and Democratic politician who served as the 11th governor of New Mexico. He was a children's healthcare advocate.

== Biography ==
Clyde Tingley was born on a farm near London, Ohio in 1881. He lived a modest life of farming. His wife Carrie suffered from tuberculosis and was informed that the climate in Ohio would eventually kill her. Her doctors suggested visiting or relocating to the warmer climate of the Southwest, and recommended the Methodist Sanitarium in Albuquerque, New Mexico.

The Tingleys relocated to New Mexico from Ohio in 1910. While his wife recovered, Clyde dabbled in local politics. He relocated just in time to see the admission of New Mexico as a state, and almost immediately he was alarmed over how the dominant Republican Party ran the State.

Tingley's first political office was on the Albuquerque City Council from 1916 to 1917 as alderman for the Second Ward. After Albuquerque switched to a City commission government in 1917, Tingley served as a city commissioner from 1922 to 1935, including ten years as Chairman (mayoral equivalent) from 1925 to 1935. He also served as district maintenance superintendent of the New Mexico State Highway Department for the Albuquerque district (1925–1926). He was also a delegate to the Democratic National Conventions of (1928, 1932, and 1936). Through this entire period, his wife's illness was at his heart, and he was an outspoken advocate for healthcare – particularly for children.

Tingley was elected Governor of New Mexico in 1934 as a proponent of Franklin Roosevelt's New Deal programs. During this time, he set up over a dozen hospitals in the state, including the Carrie Tingley Hospital in honor of his wife, to help children with tuberculosis. He was reelected in 1936 and became the first Governor of New Mexico to serve two consecutive full terms (his predecessor, Arthur Seligman, died during his second term). In 1938, he successfully resurrected the defunct New Mexico State Fair by breaking ground at the Fairgrounds. The center of the Fairgrounds, Tingley Coliseum, was named after him.

As governor, Tingley continued his predecessor's practice of systematically recording the political affiliation of applicants for federal aid, stating that "only by returning a solid Democratic front can New Mexico get its full share of the money to be distributed by the federal government in the next two years".

After the end of his tenure as Governor, he was reelected to his old position as Chairman of the Albuquerque City Commission and served a further 13 years in that role from 1940 to 1953.

Tingley was responsible for the introduction and widespread planting of the Siberian Elm (Ulmus pumila) throughout Albuquerque. In the spring, the tree distributes volumes of granular chaffe, which is sometimes jocularly referred to as "Tingley's dandruff" or "Tingley snow".

Tingley died in Albuquerque at the age of 79. He is interred at Fairview Memorial Park in Albuquerque.

Party political offices
Preceded by Arthur Seligman	Democratic nominee for Governor of New Mexico; 1934, 1936	Succeeded by John E. Miles
Political offices
Preceded by Andrew W. Hockenhull	Governor of New Mexico; 1935–1939	Succeeded by John E. Miles
