= 1920 New Mexico gubernatorial election =

- November 2, 1920
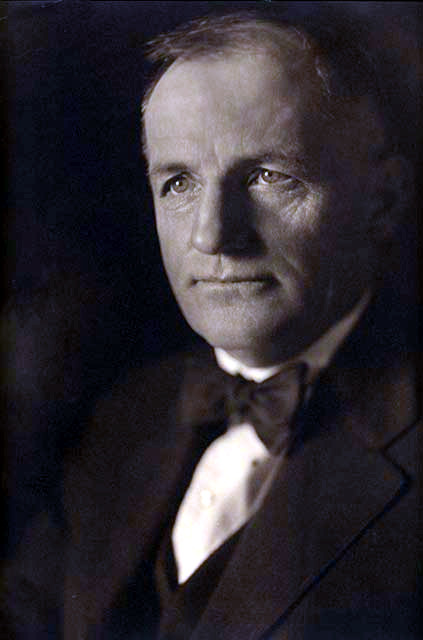

Nominee	Merritt C. Mechem	Richard H. Hanna
Party	Republican	Democratic
Popular vote	54,426	50,755
Percentage	51.26%	47.80%
- County results Mechem: 50–60% 60–70% Hanna: 50–60% 60–70% 70–80% 80–90%
Governor before election
Octaviano Ambrosio Larrazolo
Republican
Elected Governor
Merritt C. Mechem
Republican

The 1920 New Mexico gubernatorial election was held on November 2, 1920.

Incumbent Republican Governor Octaviano Ambrosio Larrazolo was defeated for renomination. Republican candidate Merritt C. Mechem defeated Democratic nominee Richard H. Hanna with 51.26% of the vote. Otero County and Union County both backed a Republican gubernatorial candidate for the first time, but would not do so again until 1950 and 1938, respectively. This was also the last gubernatorial election until 1950 in which Grant County voted for a Republican.

== General election ==
=== Candidates ===
- Richard H. Hanna, Democratic, former Chief Justice of the New Mexico Supreme Court
- Merritt C. Mechem, Republican, district judge

=== Results ===
1920 New Mexico gubernatorial election
Party	Candidate	Votes	%	±%
Republican	Merritt C. Mechem	54,426	51.26%	+0.77%
Democratic	Richard H. Hanna	50,755	47.80%	+0.12%
Farmer–Labor	W. E. McGrath	1,004	0.95%	
Majority		3,671	3.46%	
Total votes		106,185	100.00%	
Republican hold		Swing	+0.65%	

=== Results by county ===
County	Merritt C. Mechem Republican		Richard H. Hanna Democratic		W. E. McGrath Farmer-Labor		Margin		Total votes cast
County	#	%	#	%	#	%	#	%	Total votes cast
Bernalillo	4,154	41.98%	5,687	57.47%	55	0.56%	-1,533	-15.49%	9,896
Chaves	1,587	40.98%	2,256	58.25%	30	0.77%	-669	-17.27%	3,873
Colfax	3,164	51.51%	2,932	47.73%	47	0.77%	232	3.78%	6,143
Curry	786	24.55%	2,270	70.92%	145	4.53%	-1,484	-46.36%	3,201
De Baca	380	34.70%	710	64.84%	5	0.46%	-330	-30.14%	1,095
Doña Ana	2,531	63.77%	1,426	35.93%	12	0.30%	1,105	27.84%	3,969
Eddy	875	33.31%	1,723	65.59%	29	1.10%	-848	-32.28%	2,627
Grant	2,243	53.76%	1,902	45.59%	27	0.65%	341	8.17%	4,172
Guadalupe	1,531	53.98%	1,284	45.28%	21	0.74%	247	8.71%	2,836
Hidalgo	428	42.67%	571	56.93%	4	0.40%	-143	-14.26%	1,003
Lea	161	15.88%	830	81.85%	23	2.27%	-669	-65.98%	1,014
Lincoln	1,476	55.34%	1,168	43.79%	23	0.86%	308	11.55%	2,667
Luna	852	45.20%	1,007	53.42%	26	1.38%	-155	-8.22%	1,885
McKinley	1,411	54.90%	1,136	44.20%	23	0.89%	275	10.70%	2,570
Mora	2,262	48.37%	2,388	51.07%	26	0.56%	-126	-2.69%	4,676
Otero	1,207	50.40%	1,134	47.35%	54	2.25%	73	3.05%	2,395
Quay	1,172	37.73%	1,865	60.05%	69	2.22%	-693	-22.31%	3,106
Rio Arriba	3,910	64.85%	2,119	35.15%	0	0.00%	1,791	29.71%	6,029
Roosevelt	471	25.99%	1,280	70.64%	61	3.37%	-809	-44.65%	1,812
San Juan	899	48.65%	931	50.38%	18	0.97%	-32	-1.73%	1,848
San Miguel	5,105	57.34%	3,798	42.66%	0	0.00%	1,307	14.68%	8,903
Sandoval	1,129	53.20%	993	46.80%	0	0.00%	136	6.41%	2,122
Santa Fe	3,365	58.88%	2,332	40.80%	18	0.31%	1,033	18.08%	5,715
Sierra	878	57.54%	635	41.61%	13	0.85%	243	15.92%	1,526
Socorro	3,216	63.66%	1,807	35.77%	29	0.57%	1,409	27.89%	5,052
Taos	2,457	63.10%	1,431	36.75%	6	0.15%	1,026	26.35%	3,894
Torrance	1,605	54.74%	1,290	44.00%	37	1.26%	315	10.74%	2,932
Union	2,799	51.81%	2,428	44.95%	175	3.24%	371	6.87%	5,402
Valencia	2,372	62.06%	1,422	37.21%	28	0.73%	950	24.86%	3,822
Total	54,426	51.26%	50,755	47.80%	1,004	0.95%	3,671	3.46%	106,185

==== Counties that flipped from Democratic to Republican ====
- Grant
- Otero
- Sierra
- Union

==== Counties that flipped from Republican to Democratic ====
- Bernalillo
- Mora

== Bibliography ==
- Glashan, Roy R. (1979). American Governors and Gubernatorial Elections, 1775-1978. Meckler Books. ISBN 0-930466-17-9.
- Guide to U.S. Elections. Vol. II. Washington, D.C.: CQ Press. 2005. ISBN 9781568029818.
- Issued by Manuel Martinez, Secretary of State (1921). The New Mexico Blue Book or State Official Register 1921. Santa Fe, N.M.: Santa Fe New Mexican Publishing Corporation.
