= 1936 New Mexico gubernatorial election =

- November 3, 1936
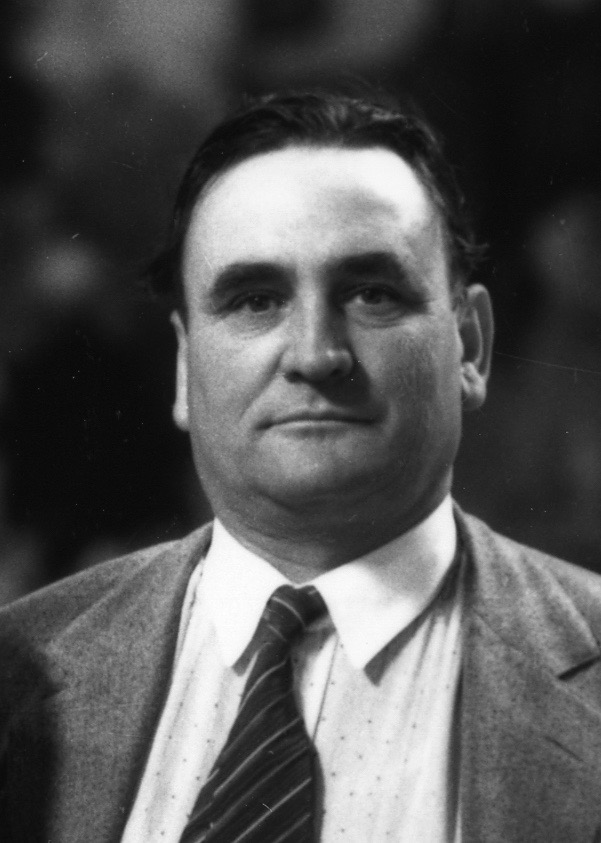

Nominee	Clyde Tingley	Jaffa Miller
Party	Democratic	Republican
Popular vote	98,089	72,511
Percentage	57.47%	42.49%
- County results Miles: 50–60% 60–70% 70–80% 80–90% Miller: 50–60%
Governor before election
Clyde Tingley
Democratic
Elected Governor
Clyde Tingley
Democratic

The 1936 New Mexico gubernatorial election took place on November 3, 1936, in order to elect the Governor of New Mexico. Incumbent Democrat Clyde Tingley won reelection to a second term. Tingley was the first Democrat to ever carry San Miguel County and Valencia County in a gubernatorial election; the latter did not back a Democrat again until 1954. Torrance County voted Democratic for the first time since 1922 and as with Valencia County, would also not vote Democratic again until 1954.

== General election ==
=== Results ===
1936 New Mexico gubernatorial election
Party	Candidate	Votes	%	±%
Democratic	Clyde Tingley (incumbent)	98,089	57.47%	+2.66%
Republican	Jaffa Miller	72,511	42.49%	−1.70%
Farmer–Labor	H. G. Rauert	71	0.04%	
	Scattering	1	0.00%	
Majority		25,578	14.99%	
Total votes		170,672	100.00%	
Democratic hold				

=== Results by county ===
County	Clyde Tingley Democratic		Jaffa Miller Republican		H. G. Rauert Farmer-Labor		Margin		Total votes cast
County	#	%	#	%	#	%	#	%	Total votes cast
Bernalillo	14,164	61.97%	8,684	37.99%	8	0.04%	5,480	23.98%	22,857 (Note: Includes the 1 Scattering vote)
Catron	1,359	58.88%	944	40.90%	5	0.22%	415	17.98%	2,308
Chaves	3,993	55.73%	3,167	44.20%	5	0.07%	826	11.53%	7,165
Colfax	3,919	52.61%	3,520	47.25%	10	0.13%	399	5.36%	7,449
Curry	4,467	75.66%	1,432	24.25%	5	0.08%	3,035	51.41%	5,904
De Baca	960	63.45%	553	36.55%	0	0.00%	407	26.90%	1,513
Doña Ana	5,059	62.13%	3,075	37.77%	8	0.10%	1,984	24.37%	8,142
Eddy	3,999	72.83%	1,492	27.17%	0	0.00%	2,507	45.66%	5,491
Grant	2,932	61.33%	1,849	38.67%	0	0.00%	1,083	22.65%	4,781
Guadalupe	2,113	53.18%	1,860	46.82%	0	0.00%	253	6.37%	3,973
Harding	1,161	53.28%	1,018	46.72%	0	0.00%	143	6.56%	2,179
Hidalgo	1,088	74.32%	376	25.68%	0	0.00%	712	48.63%	1,464
Lea	3,739	82.78%	775	17.16%	3	0.07%	2,964	65.62%	4,517
Lincoln	1,816	49.63%	1,841	50.31%	2	0.05%	-25	-0.68%	3,659
Luna	1,434	60.10%	950	39.82%	2	0.08%	484	20.28%	2,386
McKinley	2,357	59.42%	1,607	40.51%	3	0.08%	750	18.91%	3,967
Mora	2,321	49.67%	2,352	50.33%	0	0.00%	-31	-0.66%	4,673
Otero	1,772	52.23%	1,620	47.75%	1	0.03%	152	4.48%	3,393
Quay	3,238	70.67%	1,343	29.31%	1	0.02%	1,895	41.36%	4,582
Rio Arriba	4,362	49.50%	4,449	50.48%	2	0.02%	-87	-0.99%	8,813
Roosevelt	2,719	69.43%	1,195	30.52%	2	0.05%	1,524	38.92%	3,916
San Juan	1,494	50.20%	1,480	49.73%	2	0.07%	14	0.47%	2,976
San Miguel	5,678	51.90%	5,262	48.10%	0	0.00%	416	3.80%	10,940
Sandoval	1,865	48.07%	2,015	51.93%	0	0.00%	-150	-3.87%	3,880
Santa Fe	5,720	51.27%	5,426	48.63%	11	0.10%	294	2.64%	11,157
Sierra	1,564	59.95%	1,045	40.05%	0	0.00%	519	19.89%	2,609
Socorro	2,355	46.69%	2,689	53.31%	0	0.00%	-334	-6.62%	5,044
Taos	2,768	46.38%	3,200	53.62%	0	0.00%	-432	-7.24%	5,968
Torrance	2,214	51.91%	2,051	48.09%	0	0.00%	163	3.82%	4,265
Union	2,226	51.70%	2,079	48.28%	1	0.02%	147	3.41%	4,306
Valencia	3,233	50.56%	3,162	49.44%	0	0.00%	71	1.11%	6,395
Total	98,089	57.47%	72,511	42.49%	71	0.04%	25,578	14.99%	170,672

==== Counties that flipped from Republican to Democratic ====
- Guadalupe
- Harding
- San Juan
- San Miguel
- Sierra
- Torrance
- Valencia

==== Counties that flipped from Democratic to Republican ====
- Rio Arriba
- Socorro
