= Hugh B. Woodward =

American politician

7th Lieutenant Governor of New Mexico
- In office January 1, 1929 – July 11, 1929
- Governor: Richard C. Dillon
- Preceded by: Edward G. Sargent
- Succeeded by: Andrew W. Hockenhull

Personal details
- Born: April 29, 1885
- Died: August 18, 1968 (aged 83)
- Party: Republican

Hugh B. Woodward (April 29, 1885 – August 18, 1968) was an American politician. He served as the seventh lieutenant governor of New Mexico in 1929.
