= Richard C. Dillon =

8th Governor of New Mexico

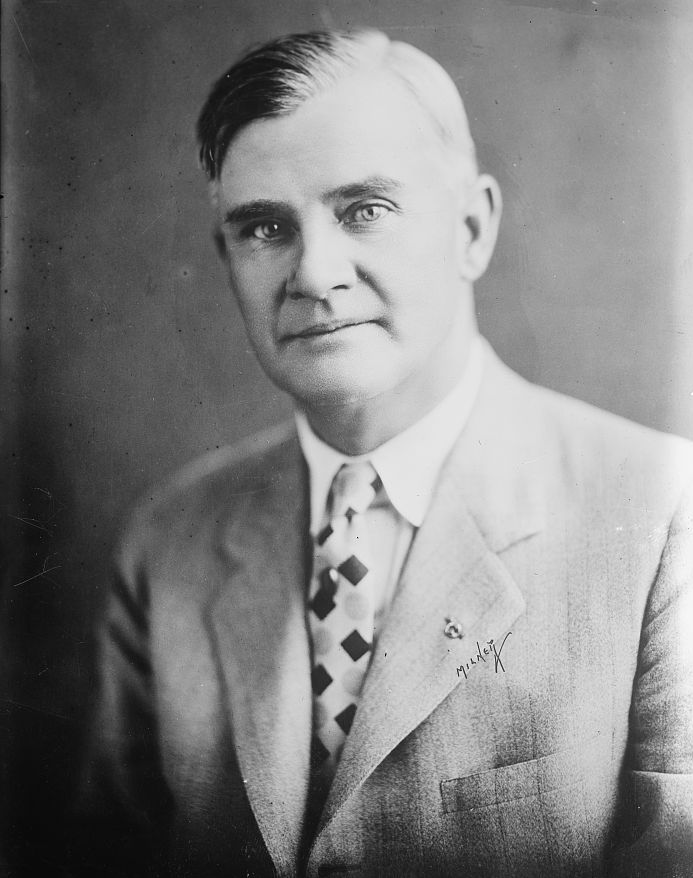

8th Governor of New Mexico
- In office January 1, 1927 – January 1, 1931
- Lieutenant: Edward F. Sargent; Hugh B. Woodward; Vacant
- Preceded by: Arthur T. Hannett
- Succeeded by: Arthur Seligman

Member of the New Mexico Senate
- In office 1924–1927

Personal details
- Born: June 24, 1877 St. Louis, Missouri, U.S.
- Died: January 5, 1966 (aged 88) Encino, New Mexico, U.S.
- Party: Republican
- Spouse: Maurine Williams
- Profession: Entrepreneur

Richard Charles Dillon (June 24, 1877 – January 5, 1966) was an American entrepreneur, politician and the eighth governor of New Mexico, from January 1, 1927 to January 1, 1931.

== Early life ==
Dillon was born in St. Louis, Missouri on June 24, 1877. His early education was attained in the common schools of Missouri. In 1889, his family moved to Springer, New Mexico. He attended the public schools there. Before entering politics, he worked as a railroad laborer and a merchant.

== Politics ==
Dillon won election to the New Mexico State Senate in 1924. He held the position for two years. He then secured the Republican gubernatorial nomination. He was elected the governor of New Mexico by a popular vote on November 2, 1926. In 1928 he was reelected to a second term, becoming the first New Mexico governor to successfully run for reelection since the state's first governor, William C. McDonald. During his tenure, the state government was managed in an efficient business-like method and Carlsbad Caverns was declared a national park by the federal government.

== Later years ==
After leaving office, he retired from political life. He remained active in his business career. He eventually established the R.C. Dillon Company. He died on January 5, 1966. He was buried at Fairview Memorial Park in Albuquerque, New Mexico.

Party political offices
Preceded by Manuel B. Otero	Republican nominee for Governor of New Mexico; 1926, 1928	Succeeded by Clarence M. Botts
Preceded by Clarence M. Botts	Republican nominee for Governor of New Mexico; 1932	Succeeded by Jaffa Miller
Preceded by Herbert B. Holt	Republican nominee for U.S. Senator from New Mexico (Class 2); 1934	Succeeded by Ernest W. Everly
Political offices
Preceded by Arthur T. Hannett	Governor of New Mexico; 1927–1931	Succeeded by Arthur Seligman
