= Andrew W. Hockenhull =

10th Governor of New Mexico

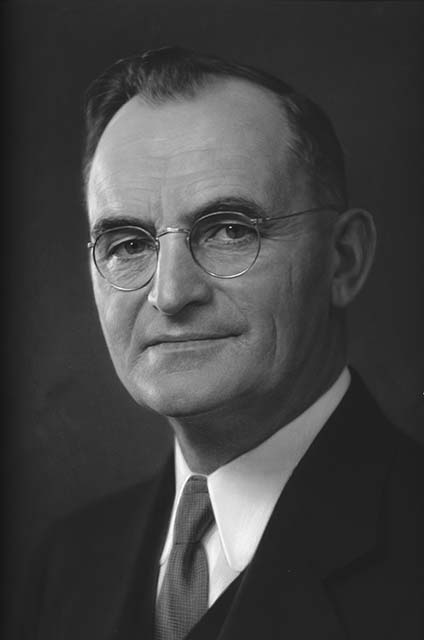

10th Governor of New Mexico
- In office September 25, 1933 – January 1, 1935
- Lieutenant: Vacant
- Preceded by: Arthur Seligman
- Succeeded by: Clyde Tingley

8th Lieutenant Governor of New Mexico
- In office January 1, 1931 – September 25, 1933
- Governor: Arthur Seligman
- Preceded by: Hugh B. Woodward
- Succeeded by: Louis Cabeza de Baca

Personal details
- Born: January 16, 1877 near Bolivar, Missouri, U.S.
- Died: June 20, 1974 (aged 97) Clovis, New Mexico, U.S.
- Party: Democratic
- Spouse: Mamie Drake
- Profession: Attorney

Andrew W. Hockenhull (January 16, 1877 – June 20, 1974) was an American attorney and the tenth governor of New Mexico.

== Background ==
Hockenhull was born in rural Missouri, near Bolivar. He attended Southwest Baptist College in Bolivar, received a bachelor's degree from the University of Missouri in 1897, and studied law at the University of Texas at Austin. Hockenhull married Maine Drake at Bolivar, Mo. on November 20, 1901. They had three daughters, Gertrude, Virginia, and Helen.

Hockenhull moved to New Mexico Territory in 1908 and homesteaded near Tucumcari, in Quay County. In 1909 he moved to Clovis and began practicing law there in 1909. He also served as assistant district attorney (1912–1916), and city attorney for six years. During World War I, he served as a member of the Lawyers Committee and the Council of Defense. A lawyer and banker, he had extensive agricultural interests throughout Curry County. A Democrat, Hockenhull was elected lieutenant governor of New Mexico in 1930 and was re-elected in 1932. He became governor upon the death of Governor Arthur Seligman in September, 1933, and completed the term on December 31, 1934.

Contending with the Great Depression consumed most of his term. After leaving office, Hockenhull returned to his legal career. In 1939, he was appointed postmaster of Clovis, starting May 31, 1939. he died in 1974

== Titles ==
He is the second Lieutenant Governor of New Mexico to assume the governor's office due to the death of the sitting governor. He also holds the title of the longest surviving former-governor of New Mexico, living 97 years, and 40 years beyond the expiration of his term.

Political offices
| Preceded by Vacant | Lieutenant Governor of New Mexico; 1931–1933 | Succeeded by Louis Cabeza de Baca |
| Preceded by Arthur Seligman | Governor of New Mexico; 1933–1935 | Succeeded by Clyde Tingley |
