= Arthur T. Hannett =

7th Governor of New Mexico

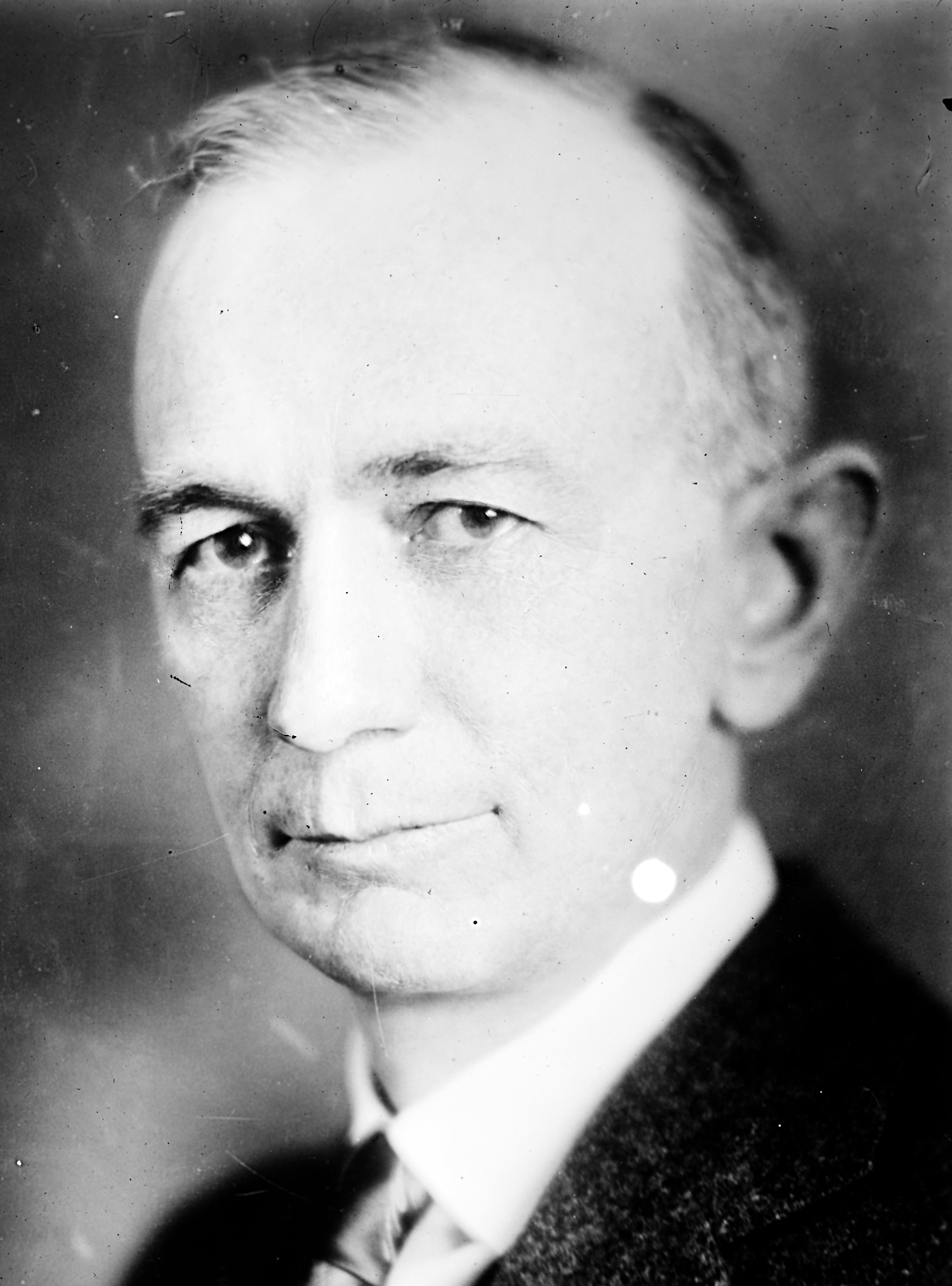

7th Governor of New Mexico
- In office January 1, 1925 – January 1, 1927
- Lieutenant: Edward F. Sargent
- Preceded by: James F. Hinkle
- Succeeded by: Richard C. Dillon

Personal details
- Born: February 17, 1884 Lyons, New York, U.S.
- Died: March 18, 1966 (aged 82) Albuquerque, New Mexico, U.S.
- Party: Democratic
- Spouse: Louise Westfall
- Profession: Attorney

Arthur Thomas Hannett (February 17, 1884 – March 18, 1966) was an American lawyer and politician who rose to become the seventh governor of New Mexico.

== Biography ==
He was born on February 17, 1884, in Lyons, New York, the son of William Hannett and Mary McCarthy. After completing high school he entered Syracuse University, where he graduated in 1910. Hannett came to Gallup, New Mexico, in 1911, where he began to practice law. His first public office was City Attorney and he also served as Mayor of Gallup for four years. Hannett married Louise Westfall, daughter of William and Estella Westfall, at Clyde, New York, on August 13, 1913. He was an alternate delegate from New Mexico to the Democratic National Convention at Baltimore in 1912, and chairman of the New Mexico delegation at the Democratic National Convention at San Francisco in 1920.

After serving as a member of the State Highway Commission from March 1923, until December 1924, Hannett was elected governor of New Mexico and served from January 1, 1925, until January 1, 1927.

During his tenure U.S. Route 66 was rerouted to avoid Santa Fe and instead passed through Albuquerque, New Mexico. The rerouting saves drivers traveling across the state nearly four hours. Legend says Hannett did the rerouting to punish the Republican Santa Fe Ring which had controlled New Mexico politics in the late 19th and early 20th centuries. Several reforms were also carried out in areas such as child labor and teacher retirement.

He died on March 18, 1966, in Albuquerque, New Mexico.

Party political offices
Preceded by James F. Hinkle	Democratic nominee for Governor of New Mexico; 1924, 1926	Succeeded by Robert C. Dow
Political offices
Preceded by James F. Hinkle	Governor of New Mexico; 1925–1927	Succeeded by Richard C. Dillon
