= Arthur Seligman =

9th Governor of New Mexico

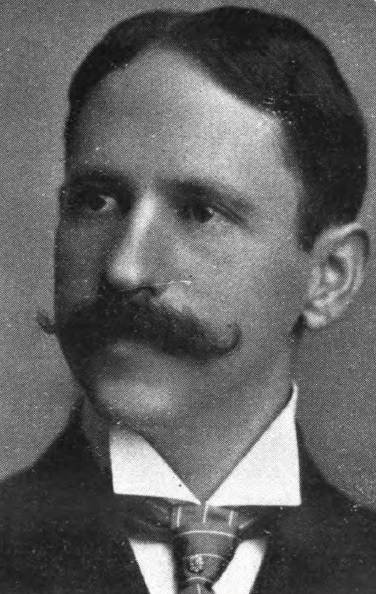

9th Governor of New Mexico
- In office January 1, 1931 – September 25, 1933
- Lieutenant: Andrew W. Hockenhull
- Preceded by: Richard C. Dillon
- Succeeded by: Andrew W. Hockenhull

15th Mayor of Santa Fe
- In office 1910–1912
- Preceded by: Jose Sena
- Succeeded by: Celso Lopez

Personal details
- Born: June 14, 1871 Santa Fe, New Mexico Territory, U.S.
- Died: September 25, 1933 (aged 62) Albuquerque, New Mexico, U.S.
- Party: Democratic
- Spouse: Frankie E. Harris (m. 1896)
- Children: 2
- Education: Peirce College

Arthur Seligman (June 14, 1871 – September 25, 1933) was an American businessman and politician. He served in several offices in New Mexico, including mayor of Santa Fe and governor.

== Early life and education ==
Seligman was born in Santa Fe, New Mexico Territory on June 14, 1871, the son of Bernard and Frances Seligman. In 1887, he graduated from the Swarthmore College Preparatory School, and in 1889 he graduated from Union Business College (now Peirce College).

== Career ==
After completing his education, Seligman became active in his family's business enterprises. He was also president of the Seligman Brothers mercantile firm (1903–1926), president of the La Fonda Building Corporation (1920–1926), president of the First National Bank (1924–1933); and auditor and board of directors member of the Northern New Mexico Loan Association.

A Democrat, Seligman was heavily involved in New Mexico's politics throughout his life. His party leadership positions included: chairman of the Santa Fe Democratic County Central Committee (1895–1911), chairman of the territorial Democratic Committee (1895–1911), chairman of the state Democratic committee (1912–1922); and delegate to the Democratic National Committee (1920–1933).

Seligman was also involved in government at the local, county, and state levels throughout his career. He served as member of the state Irrigation Commission (1904–1906), member of the New Mexico Board of Equalization (1906–1908), chairman of Santa Fe County Commission (1910–1920); mayor of Santa Fe (1910–1912), and president of the state Educational Survey Commission (1921–1923).

In 1930, Seligman was elected governor. He was reelected in 1932 and served from January 1, 1931 until his death.

In his approach to policymaking, Seligman was fiscally conservative and socially progressive. As noted by one observer

He looked with doubt upon the vast expenditures authorized by Washington but was eager ·to secure as much for the state and its people as was obtainable in the grand rush for public funds, which he knew too well must eventually come out of the pockets of the tax payers. While he held down expenditures to the minimum where he had the power, he never stinted the institutions which provided for the deaf, the blind,.the unfortunate. He was unalterable in his determination that these must be provided for, no matter how heavy the burden upon the tax payer.

== Personal life ==
Seligman and Frankie E. Harris (1867–1937) of Cleveland, Ohio were married on July 4, 1896. They were the parents of a son, Otis (1898–1943), and an adopted daughter, Ritchie Seligman (1888–1966).

Seligman died in Albuquerque on September 25, 1933, and was buried at Fairview Cemetery in Santa Fe.

== External resources ==
- Arthur Seligman at National Governors Association
- Arthur Seligman at Find a Grave
- Arthur Seligman at Political Graveyard

Party political offices
Preceded by Robert Dow	Democratic nominee for Governor of New Mexico; 1930, 1932	Succeeded by Clyde Tingley
Political offices
Preceded by Richard C. Dillon	Governor of New Mexico; 1931–1933	Succeeded by Andrew W. Hockenhull
