= Merritt C. Mechem =

5th Governor of New Mexico

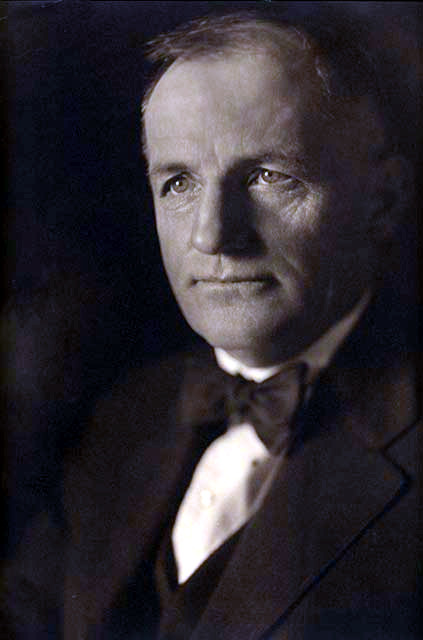

5th Governor of New Mexico
- In office January 1, 1921 – January 1, 1923
- Lieutenant: William H. Duckworth
- Preceded by: Octaviano Ambrosio Larrazolo
- Succeeded by: James F. Hinkle

Personal details
- Born: October 10, 1870 Ottawa, Kansas, U.S.
- Died: May 24, 1946 (aged 75) Albuquerque, New Mexico, U.S.
- Party: Republican
- Spouse: Eleanor Frances O'Heir
- Profession: Attorney

Merritt Cramer Mechem (October 10, 1870 – May 24, 1946) was an American politician who served as territorial Supreme Court justice and the fifth governor of New Mexico.

== Biography ==
=== Early life ===
Mechem was born in Ottawa, Kansas, to Homer C. Mechem and Martha (Davenport) Mechem. He graduated from public school in Kansas and attended the University of Kansas and Ottawa University. He was admitted to the bar in 1893. After practicing law in Fort Smith, Arkansas for ten years, he moved his law practice to Tucumcari, New Mexico at the age of thirty-two in 1903.

=== Career ===
Mechem was appointed by Governor Otero as the district attorney for Quay and Guadalupe Counties of New Mexico, a position he held from 1905 to 1909, being reappointed by Governor Hagerman. He also served as a member of the New Mexico Territorial Council from 1909 to 1911. In 1909 President Taft appointed him a justice of the New Mexico Territorial Supreme Court where he served until 1911. Thereafter he served as a district judge for the Seventh Judicial District in Socorro until 1920, being twice re-elected.

On the twelfth of February 1910, in Santa Fe, Judge Mechem was married to Miss Eleanor Frances O’Heir, a native of Chicago, Illinois.

In September 1917 in a famous attempt to silence the press Judge Mechem convicted the editor of the New Mexican of criminal contempt for publishing a story about the judge’s affidavit in a separate libel case against the newspaper. The contempt conviction was speedily reversed, but the underlying libel case was not dismissed until October 1919.

In 1920 he became the Republican candidate for governor and won by the largest percentage vote of any previous New Mexico gubernatorial election. He decided not to run for a second term.

In 1923 he opened his law practice in Albuquerque which he maintained until his death. His law offices were in the First National Bank building where he later associated with another former governor, Arthur T. Hannett. He served a term as president of the state bar association, and was a ranking Mason, an affiliate of the Scottish Rite bodies and holder of the thirty-second degree of the Scottish Rite at Santa Fe. He was also a member of the Benevolent and Protective Order of Elks, Sons of the American Revolution, the American Bar Association, and the Albuquerque Lawyers Club. He died in 1946

== Electoral history ==
=== Governor of New Mexico ===
Governor's election in New Mexico, 1920
Party	Candidate	Votes	%
Republican	Merritt C. Mechem	54,426	51.26
Democratic	Richard H. Hanna	50,755	47.80
Farmer–Labor	W. E. McGrath	1,004	0.95
Total votes		106,185	100.0
Republican hold			

== Notes ==
Party political offices
Preceded by Octaviano Ambrosio Larrazolo	Republican nominee for Governor of New Mexico; 1920	Succeeded by C. L. Hill
Political offices
Preceded by Octaviano Ambrosio Larrazolo	Governor of New Mexico; 1921–1923	Succeeded by James F. Hinkle
