= 2006 New Mexico House of Representatives election =

- November 7, 2006

All 70 seats in the New Mexico House of Representatives 36 seats needed for a majority
	Majority party	Minority party
Leader	Ben Luján	Ted Hobbs (retired)
Party	Democratic	Republican
Leader's seat	46th - Nambé	20th - Albuquerque
Last election	42	28
Seats won	42	28
Seat change	Steady	Steady
Popular vote	286,764	192,080
Percentage	59.44%	39.81%
- Results: Democratic hold Democratic gain Republican hold Republican gain
Speaker of the House before election
Ben Luján
Democratic
Elected Speaker of the House
Ben Luján
Democratic

The 2006 New Mexico House of Representatives election took place as part of the biennial United States elections. New Mexico voters elected state representatives in all 70 of the state house's districts. State representatives serve two-year terms in the New Mexico House of Representatives. The election coincided with elections for other offices, including for U.S. Senate, U.S. House, and Governor. A primary election held on June 6, 2006, determined which candidates appear on the November 7th general election ballot.

== Results summary ==
District	Incumbent	Party	Elected representative	Party
1st	Tom Taylor	Rep	Tom Taylor	Rep
2nd	Dick Cheney	Rep	James Strickler	Rep
3rd	Sandra Townsend	Rep	Paul Bandy	Rep
4th	Ray Begaye	Dem	Ray Begaye	Dem
5th	Irvin Harrison	Dem	Irvin Harrison	Dem
6th	George Hanosh	Dem	George Hanosh	Dem
7th	Kandy Cordova	Dem	Andrew Barreras	Dem
8th	Fred Luna	Dem	Elias Barela	Dem
9th	Patricia Lundstrom	Dem	Patricia Lundstrom	Dem
10th	Henry Saavedra	Dem	Henry Saavedra	Dem
11th	Rick Miera	Dem	Rick Miera	Dem
12th	Ernest Chavez	Dem	Ernest Chavez	Dem
13th	Daniel Silva	Dem	Daniel Silva	Dem
14th	Miguel Garcia	Dem	Miguel Garcia	Dem
15th	Teresa Zanetti	Rep	Teresa Zanetti	Rep
16th	Harriet Ruiz	Dem	Moe Maestas	Dem
17th	Edward Sandoval	Dem	Edward Sandoval	Dem
18th	Gail Chasey	Dem	Gail Chasey	Dem
19th	Sheryl Williams Stapleton	Dem	Sheryl Williams Stapleton	Dem
20th	Ted Hobbs	Rep	Richard Berry	Rep
21st	Mimi Stewart	Dem	Mimi Stewart	Dem
22nd	Kathy McCoy	Rep	Kathy McCoy	Rep
23rd	Eric Youngberg	Rep	Eric Youngberg	Rep
24th	Janice Arnold-Jones	Rep	Janice Arnold-Jones	Rep
25th	Danice Picraux	Dem	Danice Picraux	Dem
26th	Al Park	Dem	Al Park	Dem
27th	Larry Larrañaga	Rep	Larry Larrañaga	Rep
28th	Jimmie Hall	Rep	Jimmie Hall	Rep
29th	Thomas Anderson	Rep	Thomas Anderson	Rep
30th	Justine Fox-Young	Rep	Justine Fox-Young	Rep
31st	Greg Payne	Rep	Bill Rehm	Rep
32nd	Dona Irwin	Dem	Dona Irwin	Dem
33rd	Joni Gutierrez	Dem	Joni Gutierrez	Dem
34th	Mary Helen Garcia	Dem	Mary Helen Garcia	Dem
35th	Antonio Luján	Dem	Antonio Luján	Dem
36th	Andy Nuñez	Dem	Andy Nuñez	Dem
37th	Ed Boykin	Rep	Jeff Steinborn	Dem
38th	Dianne Hamilton	Rep	Dianne Hamilton	Rep
39th	Manuel Herrera	Dem	Manuel Herrera	Dem
40th	Nick Salazar	Dem	Nick Salazar	Dem
41st	Debbie Rodella	Dem	Debbie Rodella	Dem
42nd	Roberto Gonzales	Dem	Roberto Gonzales	Dem
43rd	Jeannette Wallace	Rep	Jeannette Wallace	Rep
44th	Jane Powdrell-Culbert	Rep	Jane Powdrell-Culbert	Rep
45th	Jim Trujillo	Dem	Jim Trujillo	Dem
46th	Ben Luján	Dem	Ben Luján	Dem
47th	Peter Wirth	Dem	Peter Wirth	Dem
48th	Lucky Varela	Dem	Lucky Varela	Dem
49th	Don Tripp	Rep	Don Tripp	Rep
50th	Rhonda Sue King	Dem	Rhonda Sue King	Dem
51st	Gloria Vaughn	Rep	Gloria Vaughn	Rep
52nd	Joe Cervantes	Dem	Joe Cervantes	Dem
53rd	Terry Marquardt	Rep	Nate Cote	Dem
54th	Joe Stell	Dem	Bill Gray	Rep
55th	John Heaton	Dem	John Heaton	Dem
56th	Dub Williams	Rep	Dub Williams	Rep
57th	Dan Foley	Rep	Dan Foley	Rep
58th	Candy Ezzell	Rep	Candy Ezzell	Rep
59th	Mary Skeen	Rep	Nora Espinoza	Rep
60th	Thomas Swisstack	Dem	Thomas Swisstack	Dem
61st	Donald Whitaker	Dem	Shirley Tyler	Rep
62nd	Donald Bratton	Rep	Donald Bratton	Rep
63rd	Jose Campos II	Dem	Jose Campos II	Dem
64th	Anna Crook	Rep	Anna Crook	Rep
65th	James Madalena	Dem	James Madalena	Dem
66th	Keith Gardner	Rep	Keith Gardner	Rep
67th	Brian Moore	Rep	Brian Moore	Rep
68th	Hector Balderas	Dem	Hector Balderas	Dem
69th	Ken Martinez	Dem	Ken Martinez	Dem
70th	Richard Vigil	Dem	Richard Vigil	Dem

Party	Candi- dates	Votes		Seats		
Party	Candi- dates	No.	%	No.	+/–	%
Democratic	57	286,764	59.44	45	Steady	60.00
Republican	40	192,080	39.81	25	Steady	40.00
Green	2	3,039	0.63	0	Steady	0.00
Independent	1	567	0.12	0	Steady	0.00
Total	100	482,450	100%	70	Steady	100%

Popular vote
Democratic	59.44%
Republican	39.81%
Green	0.63%
Independent	0.12%

House seats
Democratic	60.00%
Republican	40.00%

=== Incumbents defeated in the general election ===
- Terry Marquardt (R-District 53), defeated by Nate Cote (D)
- Donald Whitaker (D-District 61), defeated by Shirley Tyler (R)

=== Open seats that changed parties ===
- Ed Boykin (R-District 37) didn't seek re-election, seat won by Jeff Steinborn (D)
- Joe Stell (D-District 54) didn't seek re-election, seat won by Bill Gray (R)

== Predictions ==
Source	Ranking	As of
Rothenberg	Safe D	November 4, 2006

== Detailed results ==
Source for primary election results:New Mexico Secretary of State Source for general election results:New Mexico Secretary of State

=== District 1 ===
Incumbent Republican Tom Taylor has represented the 1st district and its predecessors since 1999.

New Mexico House of Representatives 1st district general election, 2006
Party	Candidate	Votes	%
Republican	Tom Taylor (incumbent)	5,760	69.41%
Democratic	Ann George	2,539	30.59%
Total votes		8,299	100%
Republican hold			

=== District 2 ===
Incumbent Republican Dick Cheney has represented the 2nd district since 2003. Cheney didn't seek re-election and fellow Republican James Strickler won the open seat.

New Mexico House of Representatives 2nd district general election, 2006
Party	Candidate	Votes	%
Republican	James Strickler	3,905	62.53%
Democratic	Alice Marie Slaven-Emond	2,340	37.47%
Total votes		6,245	100%
Republican hold			

=== District 3 ===
Incumbent Republican Sandra Townsend has represented the 3rd district since 1995. Townsend didn't seek re-election and fellow Republican Paul Bandy won the open seat.

New Mexico House of Representatives 3rd district general election, 2006
Party	Candidate	Votes	%
Republican	Paul Bandy	5,591	100%
Total votes		5,591	100%
Republican hold			

=== District 4 ===
Incumbent Democrat Ray Begaye has represented the 4th district since 1999.

New Mexico House of Representatives 4th district general election, 2006
Party	Candidate	Votes	%
Democratic	Ray Begaye (incumbent)	5,835	100%
Total votes		5,835	100%
Democratic hold			

=== District 5 ===
Incumbent Democrat Irvin Harrison has represented the 5th district since 2003.

New Mexico House of Representatives 5th district general election, 2006
Party	Candidate	Votes	%
Democratic	Irvin Harrison (incumbent)	5,673	100%
Total votes		5,673	100%
Democratic hold			

=== District 6 ===
Incumbent Democrat George Hanosh has represented the 6th district since 1998. Republican primary

New Mexico House of Representatives 6th district Republican primary election, 2006
Party	Candidate	Votes	%
Republican	R. Grant Clawson	315	62.62%
Republican	Edward Lee Smith Sr.	188	37.38%
Total votes		503	100%

General election

New Mexico House of Representatives 6th district general election, 2006
Party	Candidate	Votes	%
Democratic	George Hanosh (incumbent)	4,629	71.98%
Republican	R. Grant Clawson	1,802	28.02%
Total votes		6,431	100%
Democratic hold			

=== District 7 ===
Incumbent Democrat Kandy Cordova has represented the 7th district since 2001. Cordova didn't seek re-election and fellow Democrat Andrew Barreras won the open seat. Democratic primary

New Mexico House of Representatives 7th district Democratic primary election, 2006
Party	Candidate	Votes	%
Democratic	Andrew Barreras	590	26.35%
Democratic	Benny Hodges	551	24.61%
Democratic	Steven Otero	443	19.79%
Democratic	Kevin Cronk	393	17.55%
Democratic	Chris Martinez	262	11.70%
Total votes		2,239	100%

General election

New Mexico House of Representatives 7th district general election, 2006
Party	Candidate	Votes	%
Democratic	Andrew Barreras	4,313	53.64%
Republican	David Young	3,728	46.36%
Total votes		8,041	100%
Democratic hold			

=== District 8 ===
Incumbent Democrat Fred Luna has represented the 8th district since 1971. Luna didn't seek re-election and fellow Democrat Elias Barela won the open seat.

New Mexico House of Representatives 8th district general election, 2006
Party	Candidate	Votes	%
Democratic	Elias Barela	4,170	53.07%
Republican	Jackie Farnsworth	3,688	46.93%
Total votes		7,858	100%
Democratic hold			

=== District 9 ===
Incumbent Democrat Patricia Lundstrom has represented the 9th district since 2003.

New Mexico House of Representatives 9th district general election, 2006
Party	Candidate	Votes	%
Democratic	Patricia Lundstrom (incumbent)	5,007	100%
Total votes		5,007	100%
Democratic hold			

=== District 10 ===
Incumbent Democrat Henry Saavedra has represented the 10th district since 1977.

New Mexico House of Representatives 10th district general election, 2006
Party	Candidate	Votes	%
Democratic	Henry Saavedra (incumbent)	4,345	100%
Total votes		4,345	100%
Democratic hold			

=== District 11 ===
Incumbent Democrat Rick Miera has represented the 11th district since 1991.

New Mexico House of Representatives 11th district general election, 2006
Party	Candidate	Votes	%
Democratic	Rick Miera (incumbent)	7,127	100%
Total votes		7,127	100%
Democratic hold			

=== District 12 ===
Incumbent Democrat Ernest Chavez has represented the 12th district since 2005.

New Mexico House of Representatives 12th district general election, 2006
Party	Candidate	Votes	%
Democratic	Ernest Chavez (incumbent)	4,608	100%
Total votes		4,608	100%
Democratic hold			

=== District 13 ===
Incumbent Democrat Daniel Silva has represented the 13th district since 1985.

New Mexico House of Representatives 13th district general election, 2006
Party	Candidate	Votes	%
Democratic	Daniel Silva (incumbent)	5,548	100%
Total votes		5,548	100%
Democratic hold			

=== District 14 ===
Incumbent Democrat Miguel Garcia has represented the 14th district since 1997.

New Mexico House of Representatives 14th district general election, 2006
Party	Candidate	Votes	%
Democratic	Miguel Garcia (incumbent)	4,631	77.09%
Republican	Clara Pena	1,376	22.91%
Total votes		6,007	100%
Democratic hold			

=== District 15 ===
Incumbent Republican Teresa Zanetti has represented the 15th district since 2003.

New Mexico House of Representatives 15th district general election, 2006
Party	Candidate	Votes	%
Republican	Teresa Zanetti (incumbent)	5,711	53.65%
Democratic	Traci Jo Cadigan	4,934	46.35%
Total votes		10,645	100%
Republican hold			

=== District 16 ===
Incumbent Democrat Harriet Ruiz has represented the 16th district since 2004. Ruiz didn't seek re-election and fellow Democrat Moe Maestas won the open seat. Democratic primary

New Mexico House of Representatives 16th district Democratic primary election, 2006
Party	Candidate	Votes	%
Democratic	Moe Maestas	668	34.29%
Democratic	Pat Baca Jr.	525	26.95%
Democratic	Dan Serrano	392	20.12%
Democratic	Dominic Aragon	363	18.63%
Total votes		1,948	100%

General election

New Mexico House of Representatives 16th district general election, 2006
Party	Candidate	Votes	%
Democratic	Moe Maestas	5,703	68.59%
Republican	Storm Field	2,612	31.41%
Total votes		8,315	100%
Democratic hold			

=== District 17 ===
Incumbent Democrat Edward Sandoval has represented the 17th district since 1983.

New Mexico House of Representatives 17th district general election, 2006
Party	Candidate	Votes	%
Democratic	Edward Sandoval (incumbent)	7,965	100%
Total votes		7,965	100%
Democratic hold			

=== District 18 ===
Incumbent Democrat Gail Chasey has represented the 18th district since 1997. Democratic primary

New Mexico House of Representatives 18th district Democratic primary election, 2006
Party	Candidate	Votes	%
Democratic	Gail Chasey (incumbent)	1,434	78.10%
Democratic	Joseph Garcia	402	21.90%
Total votes		1,836	100%

General election

New Mexico House of Representatives 18th district general election, 2006
Party	Candidate	Votes	%
Democratic	Gail Chasey (incumbent)	7,049	82.76%
Republican	Lance Klafeta	1,468	17.24%
Total votes		8,517	100%
Democratic hold			

=== District 19 ===
Incumbent Democrat Sheryl Williams Stapleton has represented the 19th district since 1995.

New Mexico House of Representatives 19th district general election, 2006
Party	Candidate	Votes	%
Democratic	Sheryl Williams Stapleton (incumbent)	4,676	75.98%
Green	Donald Thompson	1,478	24.02%
Total votes		6,154	100%
Democratic hold			

=== District 20 ===
Incumbent Republican and Minority Leader Ted Hobbs has represented the 20th district since 1995. Hobbs didn't seek re-election and fellow Republican Richard Berry won the open seat. Republican primary

New Mexico House of Representatives 20th district Republican primary election, 2006
Party	Candidate	Votes	%
Republican	Richard Berry	869	52.38%
Republican	James White	469	28.27%
Republican	Kevin Dixon	321	19.35%
Total votes		1,659	100%

General election

New Mexico House of Representatives 20th district general election, 2006
Party	Candidate	Votes	%
Republican	Richard Berry	7,740	100%
Total votes		7,740	100%
Republican hold			

=== District 21 ===
Incumbent Democrat Mimi Stewart has represented the 21st district since 1995.

New Mexico House of Representatives 21st district general election, 2006
Party	Candidate	Votes	%
Democratic	Mimi Stewart (incumbent)	4,628	100%
Total votes		4,628	100%
Democratic hold			

=== District 22 ===
Incumbent Republican Kathy McCoy has represented the 22nd district since 2005.

New Mexico House of Representatives 22nd district general election, 2006
Party	Candidate	Votes	%
Republican	Kathy McCoy (incumbent)	7,564	58.25%
Democratic	Janice Saxton	5,422	41.75%
Total votes		12,986	100%
Republican hold			

=== District 23 ===
Incumbent Republican Eric Youngberg has represented the 23rd district since 2003.

New Mexico House of Representatives 23rd district general election, 2006
Party	Candidate	Votes	%
Republican	Eric Youngberg (incumbent)	5,897	52.66%
Democratic	Barbara Anne Stirling	5,302	47.34%
Total votes		11,199	100%
Republican hold			

=== District 24 ===
Incumbent Republican Janice Arnold-Jones has represented the 24th district since 2003.

New Mexico House of Representatives 24th district general election, 2006
Party	Candidate	Votes	%
Republican	Janice Arnold-Jones (incumbent)	5,735	54.70%
Democratic	Shirley Abbott	4,750	45.30%
Total votes		10,485	100%
Republican hold			

=== District 25 ===
Incumbent Democrat Danice Picraux has represented the 25th district since 1991.

New Mexico House of Representatives 25th district general election, 2006
Party	Candidate	Votes	%
Democratic	Danice Picraux (incumbent)	7,417	100%
Total votes		7,417	100%
Democratic hold			

=== District 26 ===
Incumbent Democrat Al Park has represented the 26th district since 2001.

New Mexico House of Representatives 26th district general election, 2006
Party	Candidate	Votes	%
Democratic	Al Park (incumbent)	3,896	100%
Total votes		3,896	100%
Democratic hold			

=== District 27 ===
Incumbent Republican Larry Larrañaga has represented the 27th district since 1995.

New Mexico House of Representatives 27th district general election, 2006
Party	Candidate	Votes	%
Republican	Larry Larrañaga (incumbent)	9,768	100%
Total votes		9,768	100%
Republican hold			

=== District 28 ===
Incumbent Republican Jimmie Hall has represented the 28th district since 2005.

New Mexico House of Representatives 28th district general election, 2006
Party	Candidate	Votes	%
Republican	Jimmie Hall (incumbent)	5,916	56.39%
Democratic	Shay Rose	4,575	43.61%
Total votes		10,491	100%
Republican hold			

=== District 29 ===
Incumbent Republican Thomas Anderson has represented the 29th district since 2003. Republican primary

New Mexico House of Representatives 29th district Republican primary election, 2006
Party	Candidate	Votes	%
Republican	Thomas Anderson (incumbent)	620	63.98%
Republican	James Maxwell Barnett	349	36.02%
Total votes		969	100%

General election

New Mexico House of Representatives 29th district general election, 2006
Party	Candidate	Votes	%
Republican	Thomas Anderson (incumbent)	6,929	52.78%
Democratic	Antonio Sandoval	6,199	47.22%
Total votes		13,128	100%
Republican hold			

=== District 30 ===
Incumbent Republican Justine Fox-Young has represented the 30th district since 2005. Republican primary

New Mexico House of Representatives 30th district Republican primary election, 2006
Party	Candidate	Votes	%
Republican	Justine Fox-Young (incumbent)	1,081	74.65%
Republican	Robert White	367	25.35%
Total votes		1,448	100%

General election

New Mexico House of Representatives 30th district general election, 2006
Party	Candidate	Votes	%
Republican	Justine Fox-Young (incumbent)	5,552	56.49%
Democratic	John McWaters III	4,277	43.51%
Total votes		9,829	100%
Republican hold			

=== District 31 ===
Incumbent Republican Greg Payne has represented the 31st district since 2007. Payne didn't seek re-election and fellow Republican Bill Rehm won the open seat.

New Mexico House of Representatives 31st district general election, 2006
Party	Candidate	Votes	%
Republican	Bill Rehm	7,443	58.75%
Democratic	Barbara Scharf	5,225	41.25%
Total votes		12,668	100%
Republican hold			

=== District 32 ===
Incumbent Democrat Dona Irwin has represented the 32nd district since 1999.

New Mexico House of Representatives 32nd district general election, 2006
Party	Candidate	Votes	%
Democratic	Dona Irwin (incumbent)	3,733	61.55%
Republican	Ida Kay Chandler	2,332	38.45%
Total votes		6,065	100%
Democratic hold			

=== District 33 ===
Incumbent Democrat Joni Gutierrez has represented the 33rd district since 2005.

New Mexico House of Representatives 33rd district general election, 2006
Party	Candidate	Votes	%
Democratic	Joni Gutierrez (incumbent)	4,673	100%
Total votes		4,673	100%
Democratic hold			

=== District 34 ===
Incumbent Democrat Mary Helen Garcia has represented the 34th district since 1997.

New Mexico House of Representatives 34th district general election, 2006
Party	Candidate	Votes	%
Democratic	Mary Helen Garcia (incumbent)	2,511	100%
Total votes		2,511	100%
Democratic hold			

=== District 35 ===
Incumbent Democrat Antonio Luján has represented the 35th district since 2003.

New Mexico House of Representatives 35th district general election, 2006
Party	Candidate	Votes	%
Democratic	Antonio Luján (incumbent)	3,162	67.41%
Republican	Lawrence Joy	1,529	32.59%
Total votes		4,691	100%
Democratic hold			

=== District 36 ===
Incumbent Democrat Andy Nuñez has represented the 36th district since 2001.

New Mexico House of Representatives 36th district general election, 2006
Party	Candidate	Votes	%
Democratic	Andy Nuñez (incumbent)	3,486	55.96%
Republican	Isaac Chavez	2,744	44.04%
Total votes		6,230	100%
Democratic hold			

=== District 37 ===
Incumbent Republican Ed Boykin has represented the 37th district since 2001. Boykin didn't seek re-election and Democrat Jeff Steinborn won the open seat.

New Mexico House of Representatives 37th district general election, 2006
Party	Candidate	Votes	%
Democratic	Jeff Steinborn	4,848	51.65%
Republican	Scott Witt	4,539	48.35%
Total votes		9,387	100%
Democratic gain from Republican			

=== District 38 ===
Incumbent Republican Dianne Hamilton has represented the 38th district since 1999.

New Mexico House of Representatives 38th district general election, 2006
Party	Candidate	Votes	%
Republican	Dianne Hamilton (incumbent)	6,349	100%
Total votes		6,349	100%
Republican hold			

=== District 39 ===
Incumbent Democrat Manuel Herrera has represented the 39th district since 1999. Democratic primary

New Mexico House of Representatives 39th district Democratic primary election, 2006
Party	Candidate	Votes	%
Democratic	Manuel Herrera (incumbent)	2,027	65.66%
Democratic	Ben Ortiz	1,060	34.34%
Total votes		3,087	100%

General election

New Mexico House of Representatives 39th district general election, 2006
Party	Candidate	Votes	%
Democratic	Manuel Herrera (incumbent)	5,831	100%
Total votes		5,831	100%
Democratic hold			

=== District 40 ===
Incumbent Democrat Nick Salazar has represented the 40th district since 1974. Democratic primary

New Mexico House of Representatives 40th district Democratic primary election, 2006
Party	Candidate	Votes	%
Democratic	Nick Salazar (incumbent)	3,234	72.35%
Democratic	Archie Velarde	1,236	27.65%
Total votes		4,470	100%

General election

New Mexico House of Representatives 40th district general election, 2006
Party	Candidate	Votes	%
Democratic	Nick Salazar (incumbent)	5,909	100%
Total votes		5,909	100%
Democratic hold			

=== District 41 ===
Incumbent Democrat Debbie Rodella has represented the 41st district since 1993. Democratic primary

New Mexico House of Representatives 41st district Democratic primary election, 2006
Party	Candidate	Votes	%
Democratic	Debbie Rodella (incumbent)	2,263	51.60%
Democratic	Moises Morales Jr.	2,123	48.40%
Total votes		4,386	100%

General election

New Mexico House of Representatives 41st district general election, 2006
Party	Candidate	Votes	%
Democratic	Debbie Rodella (incumbent)	5,362	100%
Total votes		5,362	100%
Democratic hold			

=== District 42 ===
Incumbent Democrat Roberto Gonzales has represented the 42nd district since 1995.

New Mexico House of Representatives 42nd district general election, 2006
Party	Candidate	Votes	%
Democratic	Roberto Gonzales (incumbent)	8,205	100%
Total votes		8,205	100%
Democratic hold			

=== District 43 ===
Incumbent Republican Jeannette Wallace has represented the 43rd district since 1991.

New Mexico House of Representatives 43rd district general election, 2006
Party	Candidate	Votes	%
Republican	Jeannette Wallace (incumbent)	7,921	100%
Total votes		7,921	100%
Republican hold			

=== District 44 ===
Incumbent Republican Jane Powdrell-Culbert has represented the 44th district since 2003.

New Mexico House of Representatives 44th district general election, 2006
Party	Candidate	Votes	%
Republican	Jane Powdrell-Culbert (incumbent)	7,516	59.06%
Democratic	Eliot Gould	5,211	40.94%
Total votes		12,727	100%
Republican hold			

=== District 45 ===
Incumbent Democrat Jim Trujillo has represented the 45th district since 2003.

New Mexico House of Representatives 45th district general election, 2006
Party	Candidate	Votes	%
Democratic	Jim Trujillo (incumbent)	5,625	100%
Total votes		5,625	100%
Democratic hold			

=== District 46 ===
Incumbent Democrat House Speaker Ben Luján has represented the 46th district since 1975.

New Mexico House of Representatives 46th district general election, 2006
Party	Candidate	Votes	%
Democratic	Ben Luján (incumbent)	8,008	100%
Total votes		8,008	100%
Democratic hold			

=== District 47 ===
Incumbent Democrat Peter Wirth has represented the 47th district since 2005.

New Mexico House of Representatives 47th district general election, 2006
Party	Candidate	Votes	%
Democratic	Peter Wirth (incumbent)	11,679	100%
Total votes		11,679	100%
Democratic hold			

=== District 48 ===
Incumbent Democrat Lucky Varela has represented the 48th district since 1987. Democratic primary

New Mexico House of Representatives 48th district Democratic primary election, 2006
Party	Candidate	Votes	%
Democratic	Lucky Varela (incumbent)	2,304	63.45%
Democratic	Ouida Macgregor	1,084	29.85%
Democratic	Andrew Perkins	243	6.69%
Total votes		3,631	100%

General election

New Mexico House of Representatives 48th district general election, 2006
Party	Candidate	Votes	%
Democratic	Lucky Varela (incumbent)	8,459	100%
Total votes		8,459	100%
Democratic hold			

=== District 49 ===
Incumbent Republican Don Tripp has represented the 49th district since 1999.

New Mexico House of Representatives 49th district general election, 2006
Party	Candidate	Votes	%
Republican	Don Tripp (incumbent)	7,651	100%
Total votes		7,651	100%
Republican hold			

=== District 50 ===
Incumbent Democrat Rhonda Sue King has represented the 50th district since 1999.

New Mexico House of Representatives 50th district general election, 2006
Party	Candidate	Votes	%
Democratic	Rhonda Sue King (incumbent)	7,032	100%
Total votes		7,032	100%
Democratic hold			

=== District 51 ===
Incumbent Republican Gloria Vaughn has represented the 51st district since 1995.

New Mexico House of Representatives 51st district general election, 2006
Party	Candidate	Votes	%
Republican	Gloria Vaughn (incumbent)	3,134	100%
Total votes		3,134	100%
Republican hold			

=== District 52 ===
Incumbent Democrat Joe Cervantes has represented the 52nd district since 2001.

New Mexico House of Representatives 52nd district general election, 2006
Party	Candidate	Votes	%
Democratic	Joe Cervantes (incumbent)	3,836	100%
Total votes		3,836	100%
Democratic hold			

=== District 53 ===
Incumbent Republican Terry Marquardt has represented the 53rd district since 1995. Marquardt lost re-election to Democrat Nate Cote.

New Mexico House of Representatives 53rd district general election, 2006
Party	Candidate	Votes	%
Democratic	Nate Cote	2,672	51.93%
Republican	Terry Marquardt (incumbent)	2,473	48.07%
Total votes		5,145	100%
Democratic gain from Republican			

=== District 54 ===
Incumbent Democrat Joe Stell has represented the 54th district since 1987. Stell didn't seek re-election and Republican Bill Gray won the open seat.

New Mexico House of Representatives 54th district general election, 2006
Party	Candidate	Votes	%
Republican	Bill Gray	2,838	54.78%
Democratic	Christy Bourgeois	2,343	45.22%
Total votes		5,181	100%
Republican gain from Democratic			

=== District 55 ===
Incumbent Democrat John Heaton has represented the 55th district since 1997.

New Mexico House of Representatives 55th district general election, 2006
Party	Candidate	Votes	%
Democratic	John Heaton (incumbent)	5,919	100%
Total votes		5,919	100%
Democratic hold			

=== District 56 ===
Incumbent Republican Dub Williams has represented the 56th district since 1995. Republican primary

New Mexico House of Representatives 56th district Republican primary election, 2006
Party	Candidate	Votes	%
Republican	Dub Williams (incumbent)	1,235	65.62%
Republican	Leo Martinez	647	34.38%
Total votes		1,882	100%

General election

New Mexico House of Representatives 56th district general election, 2006
Party	Candidate	Votes	%
Republican	Dub Williams (incumbent)	4,500	64.70%
Democratic	Carolyn Provencher	2,455	35.30%
Total votes		6,955	100%
Republican hold			

=== District 57 ===
Incumbent Republican Dan Foley has represented the 57th district since 1999.

New Mexico House of Representatives 57th district general election, 2006
Party	Candidate	Votes	%
Republican	Dan Foley (incumbent)	6,147	74.28%
Green	Cynthia Morrison	1,561	18.86%
Independent	Steven Gavi (write-in)	567	6.85%
Total votes		8,275	100%
Republican hold			

=== District 58 ===
Incumbent Republican Candy Ezzell has represented the 58th district since 2005.

New Mexico House of Representatives 58th district general election, 2006
Party	Candidate	Votes	%
Republican	Candy Ezzell (incumbent)	2,619	54.07%
Democratic	Pablo Martinez	2,225	45.93%
Total votes		4,844	100%
Republican hold			

=== District 59 ===
Incumbent Republican Mary Skeen has represented the 59th district since her appointment in 2006. Skeen didn't seek a full term and fellow Republican Nora Espinoza won the open seat. Republican primary

New Mexico House of Representatives 59th district Republican primary election, 2006
Party	Candidate	Votes	%
Republican	Nora Espinoza	1,237	53.48%
Republican	Mike Kakuska	1,076	46.52%
Total votes		2,313	100%

General election

New Mexico House of Representatives 59th district general election, 2006
Party	Candidate	Votes	%
Republican	Nora Espinoza	4,271	59.34%
Democratic	Ellen Wedum	2,926	40.66%
Total votes		7,197	100%
Republican hold			

=== District 60 ===
Incumbent Democrat Thomas Swisstack has represented the 60th district since 2003.

New Mexico House of Representatives 60th district general election, 2006
Party	Candidate	Votes	%
Democratic	Thomas Swisstack (incumbent)	5,462	56.95%
Republican	Jim Owen	4,129	43.05%
Total votes		9,591	100%
Democratic hold			

=== District 61 ===
Incumbent Democrat Donald Whitaker has represented the 61st district since 1991. Whitaker lost re-election to Republican Shirley Tyler.

New Mexico House of Representatives 61st district general election, 2006
Party	Candidate	Votes	%
Republican	Shirley Tyler	2,091	50.67%
Democratic	Donald Whitaker (incumbent)	2,036	49.33%
Total votes		4,127	100%
Republican gain from Democratic			

=== District 62 ===
Incumbent Republican Donald Bratton has represented the 62nd district since 2001.

New Mexico House of Representatives 62nd district general election, 2006
Party	Candidate	Votes	%
Republican	Donald Bratton (incumbent)	5,571	100%
Total votes		5,571	100%
Republican hold			

=== District 63 ===
Incumbent Democrat Jose Campos II has represented the 63rd district since 2003.

New Mexico House of Representatives 63rd district general election, 2006
Party	Candidate	Votes	%
Democratic	Jose Campos II (incumbent)	3,655	100%
Total votes		3,655	100%
Democratic hold			

=== District 64 ===
Incumbent Republican Anna Crook has represented the 64th district since 1995.

New Mexico House of Representatives 64th district general election, 2006
Party	Candidate	Votes	%
Republican	Anna Crook (incumbent)	4,753	100%
Total votes		4,753	100%
Republican hold			

=== District 65 ===
Incumbent Democrat James Madalena has represented the 65th district since 1985.

New Mexico House of Representatives 65th district general election, 2006
Party	Candidate	Votes	%
Democratic	James Madalena (incumbent)	5,427	100%
Total votes		5,427	100%
Democratic hold			

=== District 66 ===
Incumbent Republican Keith Gardner has represented the 66th district since 2005. Republican primary

New Mexico House of Representatives 66th district Republican primary election, 2006
Party	Candidate	Votes	%
Republican	Keith Gardner (incumbent)	1,329	70.73%
Republican	Lucille Tucker	550	29.27%
Total votes		1,879	100%

General election

New Mexico House of Representatives 66th district general election, 2006
Party	Candidate	Votes	%
Republican	Keith Gardner (incumbent)	4,996	100%
Total votes		4,996	100%
Republican hold			

=== District 67 ===
Incumbent Republican Brian Moore has represented the 67th district since 2001.

New Mexico House of Representatives 67th district general election, 2006
Party	Candidate	Votes	%
Republican	Brian Moore (incumbent)	5,792	100%
Total votes		5,792	100%
Republican hold			

=== District 68 ===
Incumbent Democrat Hector Balderas has represented the 68th district since 2005. Balderas was re-elected unopposed while simultaneously elected State Auditor. Balderas resigned his seat to assume office as State Auditor and fellow Democrat Thomas Garcia was appointed to fill Balderas's seat at the beginning of the 2007 session.

=== District 69 ===
Incumbent Democrat Ken Martinez had represented the 69th district since 1999.

New Mexico House of Representatives 69th district general election, 2006
Party	Candidate	Votes	%
Democratic	Ken Martinez (incumbent)	5,623	100%
Total votes		5,623	100%
Democratic hold			

=== District 70 ===
Incumbent Democrat Richard Vigil has represented the 70th district since 1999. Democratic primary

New Mexico House of Representatives 70th district Democratic primary election, 2006
Party	Candidate	Votes	%
Democratic	Richard Vigil (incumbent)	2,980	58.06%
Democratic	Naomi Montoya	2,153	41.94%
Total votes		5,133	100%

General election

New Mexico House of Representatives 70th district general election, 2006
Party	Candidate	Votes	%
Democratic	Richard Vigil (incumbent)	5,668	100%
Total votes		5,668	100%
Democratic hold			

== See also ==
- 2006 United States elections
- 2006 United States House of Representatives elections in New Mexico
- Elections in New Mexico
