= 2008 New Mexico House of Representatives election =

- November 4, 2008

All 70 seats in the New Mexico House of Representatives 36 seats needed for a majority
	Majority party	Minority party
Leader	Ben Luján	Tom Taylor
Party	Democratic	Republican
Leader's seat	46th - Nambé	1st - Farmington
Last election	42	28
Seats won	45	25
Seat change	▲3	▼3
Popular vote	397,618	292,683
Percentage	57.54%	42.35%
- Results: Democratic hold Democratic gain Republican hold
Speaker of the House before election
Ben Luján
Democratic
Elected Speaker of the House
Ben Luján
Democratic

The 2008 New Mexico House of Representatives election took place as part of the biennial United States elections. New Mexico voters elected state representatives in all 70 of the state house's districts. State representatives serve two-year terms in the New Mexico House of Representatives. The election coincided with elections for other offices, including for U.S. President, U.S. Senate, U.S. House, and State Senate. A primary election held on June 3, 2008, determined which candidates appear on the November 4th general election ballot.

== Results summary ==
District	Incumbent	Party	Elected representative	Party
1st	Tom Taylor	Rep	Tom Taylor	Rep
2nd	James Strickler	Rep	James Strickler	Rep
3rd	Paul Bandy	Rep	Paul Bandy	Rep
4th	Ray Begaye	Dem	Ray Begaye	Dem
5th	John Pena	Dem	Sandra Jeff	Dem
6th	George Hanosh	Dem	Eliseo Alcon	Dem
7th	Andrew Barreras	Dem	Andrew Barreras	Dem
8th	Elias Barela	Dem	Elias Barela	Dem
9th	Patricia Lundstrom	Dem	Patricia Lundstrom	Dem
10th	Henry Saavedra	Dem	Henry Saavedra	Dem
11th	Rick Miera	Dem	Rick Miera	Dem
12th	Ernest Chavez	Dem	Ernest Chavez	Dem
13th	Daniel Silva	Dem	Eleanor Chavez	Dem
14th	Miguel Garcia	Dem	Miguel Garcia	Dem
15th	Teresa Zanetti	Rep	Bill O'Neill	Dem
16th	Moe Maestas	Dem	Moe Maestas	Dem
17th	Edward Sandoval	Dem	Edward Sandoval	Dem
18th	Gail Chasey	Dem	Gail Chasey	Dem
19th	Sheryl Williams Stapleton	Dem	Sheryl Williams Stapleton	Dem
20th	Richard Berry	Rep	Richard Berry	Rep
21st	Mimi Stewart	Dem	Mimi Stewart	Dem
22nd	Kathy McCoy	Rep	Kathy McCoy	Rep
23rd	Eric Youngberg	Rep	Benjamin Hayden Rodefer	Dem
24th	Janice Arnold-Jones	Rep	Janice Arnold-Jones	Rep
25th	Danice Picraux	Dem	Danice Picraux	Dem
26th	Al Park	Dem	Al Park	Dem
27th	Larry Larrañaga	Rep	Larry Larrañaga	Rep
28th	Jimmie Hall	Rep	Jimmie Hall	Rep
29th	Thomas Anderson	Rep	Thomas Anderson	Rep
30th	Justine Fox-Young	Rep	Karen Giannini	Dem
31st	Bill Rehm	Rep	Bill Rehm	Rep
32nd	Dona Irwin	Dem	Dona Irwin	Dem
33rd	Joni Gutierrez	Dem	Joni Gutierrez	Dem
34th	Mary Helen Garcia	Dem	Mary Helen Garcia	Dem
35th	Antonio Luján	Dem	Antonio Luján	Dem
36th	Andy Nuñez	Dem	Andy Nuñez	Dem
37th	Jeff Steinborn	Dem	Jeff Steinborn	Dem
38th	Dianne Hamilton	Rep	Dianne Hamilton	Rep
39th	Rodolpho Martinez	Dem	Rodolpho Martinez	Dem
40th	Nick Salazar	Dem	Nick Salazar	Dem
41st	Debbie Rodella	Dem	Debbie Rodella	Dem
42nd	Roberto Gonzales	Dem	Roberto Gonzales	Dem
43rd	Jeannette Wallace	Rep	Jeannette Wallace	Rep
44th	Jane Powdrell-Culbert	Rep	Jane Powdrell-Culbert	Rep
45th	Jim Trujillo	Dem	Jim Trujillo	Dem
46th	Ben Luján	Dem	Ben Luján	Dem
47th	Peter Wirth	Dem	Brian Egolf	Dem
48th	Lucky Varela	Dem	Lucky Varela	Dem
49th	Don Tripp	Rep	Don Tripp	Rep
50th	Rhonda Sue King	Dem	Rhonda Sue King	Dem
51st	Gloria Vaughn	Rep	Gloria Vaughn	Rep
52nd	Joe Cervantes	Dem	Joe Cervantes	Dem
53rd	Nate Cote	Dem	Nate Cote	Dem
54th	Bill Gray	Rep	Bill Gray	Rep
55th	John Heaton	Dem	John Heaton	Dem
56th	Dub Williams	Rep	Dub Williams	Rep
57th	Dan Foley	Rep	Dennis Kintigh	Rep
58th	Candy Ezzell	Rep	Candy Ezzell	Rep
59th	Nora Espinoza	Rep	Nora Espinoza	Rep
60th	Thomas Swisstack	Dem	Jack Thomas	Dem
61st	Shirley Tyler	Rep	Shirley Tyler	Rep
62nd	Donald Bratton	Rep	Donald Bratton	Rep
63rd	Jose Campos II	Dem	Jose Campos II	Dem
64th	Anna Crook	Rep	Anna Crook	Rep
65th	James Madalena	Dem	James Madalena	Dem
66th	Keith Gardner	Rep	Keith Gardner	Rep
67th	Brian Moore	Rep	Dennis Roch	Rep
68th	Thomas Garcia	Dem	Thomas Garcia	Dem
69th	Ken Martinez	Dem	Ken Martinez	Dem
70th	Richard Vigil	Dem	Richard Vigil	Dem

Party	Candi- dates	Votes		Seats		
Party	Candi- dates	No.	%	No.	+/–	%
Democratic	55	397,618	57.54	45	▲3	64.29
Republican	46	292,683	42.35	25	▼3	35.71
Independent	1	766	0.11	0	Steady	0.00
Total	102	691,067	100%	70	Steady	100%

Popular vote
Democratic	57.54%
Republican	42.35%
Independent	0.11%

House seats
Democratic	64.29%
Republican	35.71%

=== Incumbents defeated in the primary election ===
- John Pena (D-District 5), defeated by Sandra Jeff (D)
- Daniel Silva (D-District 13), defeated by Eleanor Chavez (D)
- Dan Foley (R-District 57), defeated by Dennis Kintigh (R)

=== Incumbents defeated in the general election ===
- Teresa Zanetti (R-District 15), defeated by Bill O'Neill (D)
- Eric Youngberg (R-District 23), defeated by Benjamin Hayden Rodefer (D)
- Justine Fox-Young (R-District 30), defeated by Karen Giannini (D)

== Predictions ==
Source	Ranking	As of
Stateline	Safe D	October 15, 2008

== Detailed results ==
Source for primary election results:New Mexico Secretary of State Source for general election results:New Mexico Secretary of State

=== District 1 ===
Incumbent Republican and Minority Leader Tom Taylor has represented the 1st district and its predecessors since 1999.

New Mexico House of Representatives 1st district general election, 2008
Party	Candidate	Votes	%
Republican	Tom Taylor (incumbent)	9,762	100%
Total votes		9,762	100%
Republican hold			

=== District 2 ===
Incumbent Republican James Strickler has represented the 2nd district since 2007.

New Mexico House of Representatives 2nd district general election, 2008
Party	Candidate	Votes	%
Republican	James Strickler (incumbent)	6,120	63.84%
Democratic	Alice Marie Slaven-Emond	3,467	36.16%
Total votes		9,587	100%
Republican hold			

=== District 3 ===
Incumbent Republican Paul Bandy has represented the 3rd district since 2007.

New Mexico House of Representatives 3rd district general election, 2008
Party	Candidate	Votes	%
Republican	Paul Bandy (incumbent)	8,335	100%
Total votes		8,335	100%
Republican hold			

=== District 4 ===
Incumbent Democrat Ray Begaye has represented the 4th district since 1999.

New Mexico House of Representatives 4th district general election, 2008
Party	Candidate	Votes	%
Democratic	Ray Begaye (incumbent)	7,646	100%
Total votes		7,646	100%
Democratic hold			

=== District 5 ===
Incumbent Democrat John Pena has represented the 5th district since 2007. Pena lost re-nomination to fellow Democrat Sandra Jeff, who went on to win the general election. Democratic primary

New Mexico House of Representatives 5th district Democratic primary election, 2008
Party	Candidate	Votes	%
Democratic	Sandra Jeff	1,055	33.30%
Democratic	John Pena (incumbent)	970	30.62%
Democratic	Kevin Mitchell	656	20.71%
Democratic	Irvin Harrison	487	15.37%
Total votes		3,168	100%

General election

New Mexico House of Representatives 5th district general election, 2008
Party	Candidate	Votes	%
Democratic	Sandra Jeff	6,490	74.44%
Republican	Michael Lunnon	2,229	25.56%
Total votes		8,719	100%
Democratic hold			

=== District 6 ===
Incumbent Democrat George Hanosh has represented the 6th district since 1998. Hanosh didn't seek re-election and fellow Democrat Eliseo Alcon won the open seat. Democratic primary

New Mexico House of Representatives 6th district Democratic primary election, 2008
Party	Candidate	Votes	%
Democratic	Eliseo Alcon	1,226	42.54%
Democratic	Martha Garcia	1,092	37.89%
Democratic	Eldred Bowekaty	564	19.57%
Total votes		2,882	100%

General election

New Mexico House of Representatives 6th district general election, 2008
Party	Candidate	Votes	%
Democratic	Eliseo Alcon	5,494	61.97%
Republican	R. Grant Clawson	3,371	38.03%
Total votes		8,865	100%
Democratic hold			

=== District 7 ===
Incumbent Democrat Andrew Barreras has represented the 7th district since 2007.

New Mexico House of Representatives 7th district general election, 2008
Party	Candidate	Votes	%
Democratic	Andrew Barreras (incumbent)	6,185	55.50%
Republican	Timothy Lardner	4,960	44.50%
Total votes		11,145	100%
Democratic hold			

=== District 8 ===
Incumbent Democrat Elias Barela has represented the 8th district since 2007. Democratic primary

New Mexico House of Representatives 8th district Democratic primary election, 2008
Party	Candidate	Votes	%
Democratic	Elias Barela (incumbent)	1,203	64.99%
Democratic	Salomon Montano	648	35.01%
Total votes		1,851	100%

Republican primary

New Mexico House of Representatives 8th district Republican primary election, 2008
Party	Candidate	Votes	%
Republican	Paul Gabaldon	675	53.78%
Republican	Avililo Chavez	580	46.22%
Total votes		1,255	100%

General election

New Mexico House of Representatives 8th district general election, 2008
Party	Candidate	Votes	%
Democratic	Elias Barela (incumbent)	6,582	60.60%
Republican	Paul Gabaldon	4,279	39.40%
Total votes		10,861	100%
Democratic hold			

=== District 9 ===
Incumbent Democrat Patricia Lundstrom has represented the 9th district since 2003. Democratic primary

New Mexico House of Representatives 9th district Democratic primary election, 2008
Party	Candidate	Votes	%
Democratic	Patricia Lundstrom (incumbent)	1,861	74.98%
Democratic	Peter Watchman	621	25.02%
Total votes		2,482	100%

General election

New Mexico House of Representatives 9th district general election, 2008
Party	Candidate	Votes	%
Democratic	Patricia Lundstrom (incumbent)	6,511	100%
Total votes		6,511	100%
Democratic hold			

=== District 10 ===
Incumbent Democrat Henry Saavedra has represented the 10th district since 1977.

New Mexico House of Representatives 10th district general election, 2008
Party	Candidate	Votes	%
Democratic	Henry Saavedra (incumbent)	6,332	100%
Total votes		6,332	100%
Democratic hold			

=== District 11 ===
Incumbent Democrat Rick Miera has represented the 11th district since 1991.

New Mexico House of Representatives 11th district general election, 2008
Party	Candidate	Votes	%
Democratic	Rick Miera (incumbent)	9,600	100%
Total votes		9,600	100%
Democratic hold			

=== District 12 ===
Incumbent Democrat Ernest Chavez has represented the 12th district since 2005.

New Mexico House of Representatives 12th district general election, 2008
Party	Candidate	Votes	%
Democratic	Ernest Chavez (incumbent)	6,265	65.53%
Republican	Clyde Wheeler	2,529	26.45%
Independent	Robert Schiller	766	8.01%
Total votes		9,560	100%
Democratic hold			

=== District 13 ===
Incumbent Democrat Daniel Silva has represented the 13th district since 1985. Silva lost re-nomination to fellow Democrat Eleanor Chavez, who went on to win the general election. Democratic primary

New Mexico House of Representatives 13th district Democratic primary election, 2008
Party	Candidate	Votes	%
Democratic	Eleanor Chavez	1,201	53.71%
Democratic	Daniel Silva (incumbent)	1,035	46.29%
Total votes		2,236	100%

General election

New Mexico House of Representatives 13th district general election, 2008
Party	Candidate	Votes	%
Democratic	Eleanor Chavez	9,992	100%
Total votes		9,992	100%
Democratic hold			

=== District 14 ===
Incumbent Democrat Miguel Garcia has represented the 14th district since 1997. Democratic primary

New Mexico House of Representatives 14th district Democratic primary election, 2008
Party	Candidate	Votes	%
Democratic	Miguel Garcia (incumbent)	1,943	75.43%
Democratic	Jerry James Sanchez	633	24.57%
Total votes		2,576	100%

General election

New Mexico House of Representatives 14th district general election, 2008
Party	Candidate	Votes	%
Democratic	Miguel Garcia (incumbent)	6,713	77.58%
Republican	Clara Pena	1,940	22.42%
Total votes		8,653	100%
Democratic hold			

=== District 15 ===
Incumbent Republican Teresa Zanetti has represented the 15th district since 2003. Zanetti lost re-election to Democrat Bill O'Neill.

New Mexico House of Representatives 15th district general election, 2008
Party	Candidate	Votes	%
Democratic	Bill O'Neill	7,532	52.08%
Republican	Teresa Zanetti (incumbent)	6,929	47.92%
Total votes		14,461	100%
Democratic gain from Republican			

=== District 16 ===
Incumbent Democrat Moe Maestas has represented the 16th district since 2007.

New Mexico House of Representatives 16th district general election, 2008
Party	Candidate	Votes	%
Democratic	Moe Maestas (incumbent)	9,474	100%
Total votes		9,474	100%
Democratic hold			

=== District 17 ===
Incumbent Democrat Edward Sandoval has represented the 17th district since 1983.

New Mexico House of Representatives 17th district general election, 2008
Party	Candidate	Votes	%
Democratic	Edward Sandoval (incumbent)	9,637	66.57%
Republican	Ronald Toya	4,839	33.43%
Total votes		14,476	100%
Democratic hold			

=== District 18 ===
Incumbent Democrat Gail Chasey has represented the 18th district since 1997.

New Mexico House of Representatives 18th district general election, 2008
Party	Candidate	Votes	%
Democratic	Gail Chasey (incumbent)	10,237	100%
Total votes		10,237	100%
Democratic hold			

=== District 19 ===
Incumbent Democrat Sheryl Williams Stapleton has represented the 19th district since 1995.

New Mexico House of Representatives 19th district general election, 2008
Party	Candidate	Votes	%
Democratic	Sheryl Williams Stapleton (incumbent)	7,764	100%
Total votes		7,764	100%
Democratic hold			

=== District 20 ===
Incumbent Republican Richard Berry has represented the 20th district since 2007.

New Mexico House of Representatives 20th district general election, 2008
Party	Candidate	Votes	%
Republican	Richard Berry (incumbent)	9,462	100%
Total votes		9,462	100%
Republican hold			

=== District 21 ===
Incumbent Democrat Mimi Stewart has represented the 21st district since 1995.

New Mexico House of Representatives 21st district general election, 2008
Party	Candidate	Votes	%
Democratic	Mimi Stewart (incumbent)	6,015	67.38%
Republican	Howard Louis De La Cruz-Bancroft	2,912	32.62%
Total votes		8,927	100%
Democratic hold			

=== District 22 ===
Incumbent Republican Kathy McCoy has represented the 22nd district since 2005. Republican primary

New Mexico House of Representatives 22nd district Republican primary election, 2008
Party	Candidate	Votes	%
Republican	Kathy McCoy (incumbent)	2,413	68.73%
Republican	James Smith	556	15.84%
Republican	Daniel Allen Salzwedel	542	15.44%
Total votes		3,511	100%

General election

New Mexico House of Representatives 22nd district general election, 2008
Party	Candidate	Votes	%
Republican	Kathy McCoy (incumbent)	10,140	58.37%
Democratic	Janice Saxton	7,233	41.63%
Total votes		17,373	100%
Republican hold			

=== District 23 ===
Incumbent Republican Eric Youngberg has represented the 23rd district since 2003. Youngberg lost re-election to Democrat Benjamin Hayden Rodefer.

New Mexico House of Representatives 23rd district general election, 2008
Party	Candidate	Votes	%
Democratic	Benjamin Hayden Rodefer	8,149	51.37%
Republican	Eric Youngberg (incumbent)	7,713	48.63%
Total votes		15,862	100%
Democratic gain from Republican			

=== District 24 ===
Incumbent Republican Janice Arnold-Jones has represented the 24th district since 2003.

New Mexico House of Representatives 24th district general election, 2008
Party	Candidate	Votes	%
Republican	Janice Arnold-Jones (incumbent)	8,704	100%
Total votes		8,704	100%
Republican hold			

=== District 25 ===
Incumbent Democrat Danice Picraux has represented the 25th district since 1991.

New Mexico House of Representatives 25th district general election, 2008
Party	Candidate	Votes	%
Democratic	Danice Picraux (incumbent)	9,572	100%
Total votes		9,572	100%
Democratic hold			

=== District 26 ===
Incumbent Democrat Al Park has represented the 26th district since 2001.

New Mexico House of Representatives 26th district general election, 2008
Party	Candidate	Votes	%
Democratic	Al Park (incumbent)	5,502	74.99%
Republican	Rhead Story	1,835	25.01%
Total votes		7,337	100%
Democratic hold			

=== District 27 ===
Incumbent Republican Larry Larrañaga has represented the 27th district since 1995.

New Mexico House of Representatives 27th district general election, 2008
Party	Candidate	Votes	%
Republican	Larry Larrañaga (incumbent)	11,882	100%
Total votes		11,882	100%
Republican hold			

=== District 28 ===
Incumbent Republican Jimmie Hall has represented the 28th district since 2005.

New Mexico House of Representatives 28th district general election, 2008
Party	Candidate	Votes	%
Republican	Jimmie Hall (incumbent)	7,274	53.56%
Democratic	Shay Rose	6,306	46.44%
Total votes		13,580	100%
Republican hold			

=== District 29 ===
Incumbent Republican Thomas Anderson has represented the 29th district since 2003.

New Mexico House of Representatives 29th district general election, 2008
Party	Candidate	Votes	%
Republican	Thomas Anderson (incumbent)	14,871	100%
Total votes		14,871	100%
Republican hold			

=== District 30 ===
Incumbent Republican Justine Fox-Young has represented the 30th district since 2005. Fox-Young lost re-election to Democrat Karen Giannini.

New Mexico House of Representatives 30th district general election, 2008
Party	Candidate	Votes	%
Democratic	Karen Giannini	6,647	50.62%
Republican	Justine Fox-Young (incumbent)	6,483	49.38%
Total votes		13,130	100%
Democratic gain from Republican			

=== District 31 ===
Incumbent Republican Bill Rehm has represented the 31st district since 2007.

New Mexico House of Representatives 31st district general election, 2008
Party	Candidate	Votes	%
Republican	Bill Rehm (incumbent)	11,117	100%
Total votes		11,117	100%
Republican hold			

=== District 32 ===
Incumbent Democrat Dona Irwin has represented the 32nd district since 1999.

New Mexico House of Representatives 32nd district general election, 2008
Party	Candidate	Votes	%
Democratic	Dona Irwin (incumbent)	5,325	65.38%
Republican	Philip Skinner	2,820	34.62%
Total votes		8,145	100%
Democratic hold			

=== District 33 ===
Incumbent Democrat Joni Gutierrez has represented the 33rd district since 2005. Democratic primary

New Mexico House of Representatives 33rd district general election, 2008
Party	Candidate	Votes	%
Democratic	Joni Gutierrez (incumbent)	1,268	71.28%
Democratic	Jesus Caro Jr.	511	28.72%
Total votes		1,779	100%

General election

New Mexico House of Representatives 33rd district general election, 2008
Party	Candidate	Votes	%
Democratic	Joni Gutierrez (incumbent)	7,647	100%
Total votes		7,647	100%
Democratic hold			

=== District 34 ===
Incumbent Democrat Mary Helen Garcia has represented the 34th district since 1997.

New Mexico House of Representatives 34th district general election, 2008
Party	Candidate	Votes	%
Democratic	Mary Helen Garcia (incumbent)	5,111	100%
Total votes		5,111	100%
Democratic hold			

=== District 35 ===
Incumbent Democrat Antonio Luján has represented the 35th district since 2003.

New Mexico House of Representatives 35th district general election, 2008
Party	Candidate	Votes	%
Democratic	Antonio Luján (incumbent)	6,937	100%
Total votes		6,937	100%
Democratic hold			

=== District 36 ===
Incumbent Democrat Andy Nuñez has represented the 36th district since 2001.

New Mexico House of Representatives 36th district general election, 2008
Party	Candidate	Votes	%
Democratic	Andy Nuñez (incumbent)	5,432	53.60%
Republican	Mike Tellez	4,703	46.40%
Total votes		10,135	100%
Democratic hold			

=== District 37 ===
Incumbent Democrat Jeff Steinborn has represented the 37th district since 2007.

New Mexico House of Representatives 37th district general election, 2008
Party	Candidate	Votes	%
Democratic	Jeff Steinborn (incumbent)	9,305	60.53%
Republican	D. Kent Evans	6,068	39.47%
Total votes		15,373	100%
Democratic hold			

=== District 38 ===
Incumbent Republican Dianne Hamilton has represented the 38th district since 1999.

New Mexico House of Representatives 38th district general election, 2008
Party	Candidate	Votes	%
Republican	Dianne Hamilton (incumbent)	7,754	100%
Total votes		7,754	100%
Republican hold			

=== District 39 ===
Incumbent Democrat Rodolpho Martinez has represented the 39th district since 2007. Democratic primary

New Mexico House of Representatives 39th district Democratic primary election, 2008
Party	Candidate	Votes	%
Democratic	Rodolpho Martinez (incumbent)	1,827	57.22%
Democratic	Charles Kelly	1,366	42.78%
Total votes		3,193	100%

General election

New Mexico House of Representatives 39th district general election, 2008
Party	Candidate	Votes	%
Democratic	Rodolpho Martinez (incumbent)	7,254	100%
Total votes		7,254	100%
Democratic hold			

=== District 40 ===
Incumbent Democrat Nick Salazar has represented the 40th district since 1974.

New Mexico House of Representatives 40th district general election, 2008
Party	Candidate	Votes	%
Democratic	Nick Salazar (incumbent)	8,758	100%
Total votes		8,758	100%
Democratic hold			

=== District 41 ===
Incumbent Democrat Debbie Rodella has represented the 41st district since 1993.

New Mexico House of Representatives 41st district general election, 2008
Party	Candidate	Votes	%
Democratic	Debbie Rodella (incumbent)	7,812	100%
Total votes		7,812	100%
Democratic hold			

=== District 42 ===
Incumbent Democrat Roberto Gonzales has represented the 42nd district since 1995.

New Mexico House of Representatives 42nd district general election, 2008
Party	Candidate	Votes	%
Democratic	Roberto Gonzales (incumbent)	11,597	100%
Total votes		11,597	100%
Democratic hold			

=== District 43 ===
Incumbent Republican Jeannette Wallace has represented the 43rd district since 1991.

New Mexico House of Representatives 43rd district general election, 2008
Party	Candidate	Votes	%
Republican	Jeannette Wallace (incumbent)	9,677	100%
Total votes		9,677	100%
Republican hold			

=== District 44 ===
Incumbent Republican Jane Powdrell-Culbert has represented the 44th district since 2003. Democratic primary

New Mexico House of Representatives 44th district Democratic primary election, 2008
Party	Candidate	Votes	%
Democratic	Lisa Cour	1,373	72.99%
Democratic	Gary Alan Van Valin	508	27.01%
Total votes		1,881	100%

General election

New Mexico House of Representatives 44th district general election, 2008
Party	Candidate	Votes	%
Republican	Jane Powdrell-Culbert (incumbent)	11,581	54.13%
Democratic	Lisa Cour	9,812	45.87%
Total votes		21,393	100%
Republican hold			

=== District 45 ===
Incumbent Democrat Jim Trujillo has represented the 45th district since 2003.

New Mexico House of Representatives 45th district general election, 2008
Party	Candidate	Votes	%
Democratic	Jim Trujillo (incumbent)	8,678	100%
Total votes		8,678	100%
Democratic hold			

=== District 46 ===
Incumbent Democrat House Speaker Ben Luján has represented the 46th district since 1975.

New Mexico House of Representatives 46th district general election, 2008
Party	Candidate	Votes	%
Democratic	Ben Luján (incumbent)	11,025	100%
Total votes		11,025	100%
Democratic hold			

=== District 47 ===
Incumbent Democrat Peter Wirth has represented the 47th district since 2005. Wirth retired to run for the State Senate and fellow Democrat Brian Egolf won the open seat.

New Mexico House of Representatives 47th district general election, 2008
Party	Candidate	Votes	%
Democratic	Brian Egolf	14,305	100%
Total votes		14,305	100%
Democratic hold			

=== District 48 ===
Incumbent Democrat Lucky Varela has represented the 48th district since 1987.

New Mexico House of Representatives 48th district general election, 2008
Party	Candidate	Votes	%
Democratic	Lucky Varela (incumbent)	11,173	100%
Total votes		11,173	100%
Democratic hold			

=== District 49 ===
Incumbent Republican Don Tripp has represented the 49th district since 1999.

New Mexico House of Representatives 49th district general election, 2008
Party	Candidate	Votes	%
Republican	Don Tripp (incumbent)	9,688	100%
Total votes		9,688	100%
Republican hold			

=== District 50 ===
Incumbent Democrat Rhonda Sue King has represented the 50th district since 1999.

New Mexico House of Representatives 50th district general election, 2008
Party	Candidate	Votes	%
Democratic	Rhonda Sue King (incumbent)	9,487	100%
Total votes		9,487	100%
Democratic hold			

=== District 51 ===
Incumbent Republican Gloria Vaughn has represented the 51st district since 1995.

New Mexico House of Representatives 51st district general election, 2008
Party	Candidate	Votes	%
Republican	Gloria Vaughn (incumbent)	3,819	54.24%
Democratic	Douglas Matthew Post	3,222	45.76%
Total votes		7,041	100%
Republican hold			

=== District 52 ===
Incumbent Democrat Joe Cervantes has represented the 52nd district since 2001.

New Mexico House of Representatives 52nd district general election, 2008
Party	Candidate	Votes	%
Democratic	Joe Cervantes (incumbent)	6,443	100%
Total votes		6,443	100%
Democratic hold			

=== District 53 ===
Incumbent Democrat Nate Cote has represented the 53rd district since 2007. Republican primary

New Mexico House of Representatives 53rd district Republican primary election, 2008
Party	Candidate	Votes	%
Republican	Stanford Eric Locke	619	61.65%
Republican	T.E. Fry	385	38.35%
Total votes		1,004	100%

General election

New Mexico House of Representatives 53rd district general election, 2008
Party	Candidate	Votes	%
Democratic	Nate Cote (incumbent)	5,864	59.02%
Republican	Stanford Eric Locke	4,072	40.98%
Total votes		9,936	100%
Democratic hold			

=== District 54 ===
Incumbent Republican Bill Gray has represented the 54th district since 2007.

New Mexico House of Representatives 54th district general election, 2008
Party	Candidate	Votes	%
Republican	Bill Gray (incumbent)	4,833	100%
Total votes		4,833	100%
Republican hold			

=== District 55 ===
Incumbent Democrat John Heaton has represented the 55th district since 1997.

New Mexico House of Representatives 55th district general election, 2008
Party	Candidate	Votes	%
Democratic	John Heaton (incumbent)	5,676	54.16%
Republican	Cathrynn Brown	4,805	45.84%
Total votes		10,481	100%
Democratic hold			

=== District 56 ===
Incumbent Republican Dub Williams has represented the 56th district since 1995.

New Mexico House of Representatives 56th district general election, 2008
Party	Candidate	Votes	%
Republican	Dub Williams (incumbent)	7,288	100%
Total votes		7,288	100%
Republican hold			

=== District 57 ===
Incumbent Republican Dan Foley has represented the 57th district since 1999. Foley lost re-nominantion to fellow Republican Dennis Kintigh, who went on to win the general election. Republican primary

New Mexico House of Representatives 57th district Republican primary election, 2008
Party	Candidate	Votes	%
Republican	Dennis Kintigh	2,417	56.88%
Republican	Dan Foley (incumbent)	1,832	43.12%
Total votes		4,249	100%

General election

New Mexico House of Representatives 57th district general election, 2008
Party	Candidate	Votes	%
Republican	Dennis Kintigh	8,229	66.05%
Democratic	Mary Frances Barron	4,230	33.95%
Total votes		12,459	100%
Republican hold			

=== District 58 ===
Incumbent Republican Candy Ezzell has represented the 58th district since 2005.

New Mexico House of Representatives 58th district general election, 2008
Party	Candidate	Votes	%
Republican	Candy Ezzell (incumbent)	4,208	61.62%
Democratic	George Peterson	2,621	38.38%
Total votes		6,829	100%
Republican hold			

=== District 59 ===
Incumbent Republican Nora Espinoza has represented the 59th district since 2007.

New Mexico House of Representatives 59th district general election, 2008
Party	Candidate	Votes	%
Republican	Nora Espinoza (incumbent)	6,469	65.24%
Democratic	Ellen Wedum	3,446	34.76%
Total votes		9,915	100%
Republican hold			

=== District 60 ===
Incumbent Democrat Thomas Swisstack has represented the 60th district since 2003. Swisstack didn't seek re-election and fellow Democrat Jack Thomas won the open seat.

New Mexico House of Representatives 60th district general election, 2008
Party	Candidate	Votes	%
Democratic	Jack Thomas	8,362	50.85%
Republican	Paula Papponi	8,084	49.15%
Total votes		16,446	100%
Democratic hold			

=== District 61 ===
Incumbent Republican Shirley Tyler has represented the 61st district since 2007.

New Mexico House of Representatives 61st district general election, 2008
Party	Candidate	Votes	%
Republican	Shirley Tyler (incumbent)	4,713	100%
Total votes		4,713	100%
Republican hold			

=== District 62 ===
Incumbent Republican Donald Bratton has represented the 62nd district since 2001.

New Mexico House of Representatives 62nd district general election, 2008
Party	Candidate	Votes	%
Republican	Donald Bratton (incumbent)	8,402	100%
Total votes		8,402	100%
Republican hold			

=== District 63 ===
Incumbent Democrat Jose Campos II has represented the 63rd district since 2003.

New Mexico House of Representatives 63rd district general election, 2008
Party	Candidate	Votes	%
Democratic	Jose Campos II (incumbent)	4,001	58.77%
Republican	Matthew Rush	2,807	41.23%
Total votes		6,808	100%
Democratic hold			

=== District 64 ===
Incumbent Republican Anna Crook has represented the 64th district since 1995.

New Mexico House of Representatives 64th district general election, 2008
Party	Candidate	Votes	%
Republican	Anna Crook (incumbent)	5,977	63.95%
Democratic	Mario Trujillo	3,370	36.05%
Total votes		9,347	100%
Republican hold			

=== District 65 ===
Incumbent Democrat James Madalena has represented the 65th district since 1985.

New Mexico House of Representatives 65th district general election, 2008
Party	Candidate	Votes	%
Democratic	James Madalena (incumbent)	8,049	100%
Total votes		8,049	100%
Democratic hold			

=== District 66 ===
Incumbent Republican Keith Gardner has represented the 66th district since 2005.

New Mexico House of Representatives 66th district general election, 2008
Party	Candidate	Votes	%
Republican	Keith Gardner (incumbent)	7,330	100%
Total votes		7,330	100%
Republican hold			

=== District 67 ===
Incumbent Republican Brian Moore has represented the 67th district since 2001. Moore didn't seek re-election and fellow Republican Dennis Roch won the open seat. Democratic primary

New Mexico House of Representatives 67th district Democratic primary election, 2008
Party	Candidate	Votes	%
Democratic	Craig Cosner	1,248	58.70%
Democratic	Van Robertson	878	41.30%
Total votes		2,126	100%

General election

New Mexico House of Representatives 67th district general election, 2008
Party	Candidate	Votes	%
Republican	Dennis Roch	5,496	55.19%
Democratic	Craig Cosner	4,463	44.81%
Total votes		9,959	100%
Republican hold			

=== District 68 ===
Incumbent Democrat Thomas Garcia has represented the 68th district since 2007. Democratic primary

New Mexico House of Representatives 68th district Democratic primary election, 2008
Party	Candidate	Votes	%
Democratic	Thomas Garcia (incumbent)	2,823	63.54%
Democratic	Bengie Regensberg	1,620	36.46%
Total votes		4,443	100%

General election

New Mexico House of Representatives 68th district general election, 2008
Party	Candidate	Votes	%
Democratic	Thomas Garcia (incumbent)	8,226	72.84%
Republican	Sylvia Olson	3,067	27.16%
Total votes		11,293	100%
Democratic hold			

=== District 69 ===
Incumbent Democrat and Majority Leader Ken Martinez had represented the 69th district since 1999.

New Mexico House of Representatives 69th district general election, 2008
Party	Candidate	Votes	%
Democratic	Ken Martinez (incumbent)	7,457	100%
Total votes		7,457	100%
Democratic hold			

=== District 70 ===
Incumbent Democrat Richard Vigil has represented the 70th district since 1999. Democratic primary

New Mexico House of Representatives 70th district Democratic primary election, 2008
Party	Candidate	Votes	%
Democratic	Richard Vigil (incumbent)	1,986	43.61%
Democratic	Naomi Montoya	1,549	34.01%
Democratic	Travis Regensberg	1,019	22.38%
Total votes		4,554	100%

General election

New Mexico House of Representatives 70th district general election, 2008
Party	Candidate	Votes	%
Democratic	Richard Vigil (incumbent)	7,185	69.81%
Republican	Mel Root	3,107	30.19%
Total votes		10,292	100%
Democratic hold			

== See also ==
- 2008 United States elections
- 2008 United States House of Representatives elections in New Mexico
- Elections in New Mexico
