= 2010 New Mexico House of Representatives election =

- November 2, 2010

All 70 seats in the New Mexico House of Representatives 36 seats needed for a majority
	Majority party	Minority party
Leader	Ben Luján	Tom Taylor
Party	Democratic	Republican
Leader's seat	46th - Nambé	1st - Farmington
Last election	45	25
Seats won	37	33
Seat change	▼8	▲8
Popular vote	262,078	253,261
Percentage	50.75%	49.05%
- Results: Democratic hold Republican hold Republican gain
Speaker of the House before election
Ben Luján
Democratic
Elected Speaker of the House
Ben Luján
Democratic

The 2010 New Mexico House of Representatives election took place as part of the biennial United States elections. New Mexico voters elected state representatives in all 70 of the state house's districts. State representatives serve two-year terms in the New Mexico House of Representatives. The election coincided with elections for other offices, including for Governor, U.S. House, and Attorney General. A primary election held on June 1, 2010, determined which candidates appear on the November 2nd general election ballot.

== Results summary ==
District	Incumbent	Party	Elected representative	Party
1st	Tom Taylor	Rep	Tom Taylor	Rep
2nd	James Strickler	Rep	James Strickler	Rep
3rd	Paul Bandy	Rep	Paul Bandy	Rep
4th	Ray Begaye	Dem	Ray Begaye	Dem
5th	Sandra Jeff	Dem	Sandra Jeff	Dem
6th	Eliseo Alcon	Dem	Eliseo Alcon	Dem
7th	Andrew Barreras	Dem	David Chavez	Rep
8th	Elias Barela	Dem	Alonzo Baldonado	Rep
9th	Patricia Lundstrom	Dem	Patricia Lundstrom	Dem
10th	Henry Saavedra	Dem	Henry Saavedra	Dem
11th	Rick Miera	Dem	Rick Miera	Dem
12th	Ernest Chavez	Dem	Ernest Chavez	Dem
13th	Eleanor Chavez	Dem	Eleanor Chavez	Dem
14th	Miguel Garcia	Dem	Miguel Garcia	Dem
15th	Bill O'Neill	Dem	Bill O'Neill	Dem
16th	Moe Maestas	Dem	Moe Maestas	Dem
17th	Edward Sandoval	Dem	Edward Sandoval	Dem
18th	Gail Chasey	Dem	Gail Chasey	Dem
19th	Sheryl Williams Stapleton	Dem	Sheryl Williams Stapleton	Dem
20th	James White	Rep	James White	Rep
21st	Mimi Stewart	Dem	Mimi Stewart	Dem
22nd	Kathy McCoy	Rep	James Smith	Rep
23rd	Benjamin Rodefer	Dem	David Doyle	Rep
24th	Janice Arnold-Jones	Rep	Conrad James	Rep
25th	Danice Picraux	Dem	Danice Picraux	Dem
26th	Al Park	Dem	Al Park	Dem
27th	Larry Larrañaga	Rep	Larry Larrañaga	Rep
28th	Jimmie Hall	Rep	Jimmie Hall	Rep
29th	Thomas Anderson	Rep	Thomas Anderson	Rep
30th	Karen Giannini	Dem	Nate Gentry	Rep
31st	Bill Rehm	Rep	Bill Rehm	Rep
32nd	Dona Irwin	Dem	Dona Irwin	Dem
33rd	Joni Gutierrez	Dem	Joni Gutierrez	Dem
34th	Mary Helen Garcia	Dem	Mary Helen Garcia	Dem
35th	Antonio Luján	Dem	Antonio Luján	Dem
36th	Andy Nuñez	Dem	Andy Nuñez	Dem
37th	Jeff Steinborn	Dem	Terry McMillan	Rep
38th	Dianne Hamilton	Rep	Dianne Hamilton	Rep
39th	Rodolpho Martinez	Dem	Rodolpho Martinez	Dem
40th	Nick Salazar	Dem	Nick Salazar	Dem
41st	Debbie Rodella	Dem	Debbie Rodella	Dem
42nd	Roberto Gonzales	Dem	Roberto Gonzales	Dem
43rd	Jeannette Wallace	Rep	Jeannette Wallace	Rep
44th	Jane Powdrell-Culbert	Rep	Jane Powdrell-Culbert	Rep
45th	Jim Trujillo	Dem	Jim Trujillo	Dem
46th	Ben Luján	Dem	Ben Luján	Dem
47th	Brian Egolf	Dem	Brian Egolf	Dem
48th	Lucky Varela	Dem	Lucky Varela	Dem
49th	Don Tripp	Rep	Don Tripp	Rep
50th	Rhonda Sue King	Dem	Rhonda Sue King	Dem
51st	Gloria Vaughn	Rep	Yvette Herrell	Rep
52nd	Joe Cervantes	Dem	Joe Cervantes	Dem
53rd	Nate Cote	Dem	Ricky Little	Rep
54th	Bill Gray	Rep	Bill Gray	Rep
55th	John Heaton	Dem	Cathrynn Brown	Rep
56th	Zachary Cook	Rep	Zachary Cook	Rep
57th	Dennis Kintigh	Rep	Dennis Kintigh	Rep
58th	Candy Ezzell	Rep	Candy Ezzell	Rep
59th	Nora Espinoza	Rep	Nora Espinoza	Rep
60th	Jack Thomas	Dem	Tim Lewis	Rep
61st	Shirley Tyler	Rep	Shirley Tyler	Rep
62nd	Donald Bratton	Rep	Donald Bratton	Rep
63rd	Jose Campos	Dem	George Dodge Jr.	Dem
64th	Anna Crook	Rep	Anna Crook	Rep
65th	James Madalena	Dem	James Madalena	Dem
66th	Keith Gardner	Rep	Keith Gardner	Rep
67th	Dennis Roch	Rep	Dennis Roch	Rep
68th	Thomas Garcia	Dem	Thomas Garcia	Dem
69th	Ken Martinez	Dem	Ken Martinez	Dem
70th	Richard Vigil	Dem	Richard Vigil	Dem

Party	Candi- dates	Votes		Seats		
Party	Candi- dates	No.	%	No.	+/–	%
Democratic	53	262,078	50.75	38	▼8	52.86
Republican	50	253,261	49.05	32	▲8	47.14
Libertarian	1	524	0.10	0	Steady	0.00
Independent	1	509	0.10	0	Steady	0.00
Total	105	516,372	100%	70	Steady	100%

House seats
Democratic	52.86%
Republican	47.14%

Popular vote
Democratic	50.75%
Republican	49.05%
Libertarian	0.10%
Independent	0.10%

=== Incumbents defeated in the primary election ===
- Elias Barela (D-District 8), defeated by Julian Luna (D)
- Gloria Vaughn (R-District 51), defeated by Yvette Herrell (R)

=== Incumbents defeated in the general election ===
- Andrew Barreras (D-District 7), defeated by David Chavez (R)
- Benjamin Rodefer (D-District 23), defeated by David Doyle (R)
- Karen Giannini (D-District 30), defeated by Nate Gentry (R)
- Jeff Steinborn (D-District 37), defeated by Terry McMillan (R)
- Nate Cote (D-District 53), defeated by Ricky Little (R)
- John Heaton (D-District 55), defeated by Cathrynn Brown (R)
- Jack Thomas (D-District 60), defeated by Tim Lewis (R)

=== Open seats that changed parties ===
- Elias Barela (D-District 8) lost re-nomination, seat won by Alonzo Baldonado (R)

== Predictions ==
Source	Ranking	As of
Governing	Likely D	November 1, 2010

== Detailed results ==
Source for primary election results:New Mexico Secretary of State Source for general election results:New Mexico Secretary of State

=== District 1 ===
Incumbent Republican and Minority Leader Tom Taylor has represented the 1st district and its predecessors since 1999.

New Mexico House of Representatives 1st district general election, 2010
Party	Candidate	Votes	%
Republican	Tom Taylor (incumbent)	8,136	100%
Total votes		8,136	100%
Republican hold			

=== District 2 ===
Incumbent Republican James Strickler has represented the 2nd district since 2007.

New Mexico House of Representatives 2nd district general election, 2010
Party	Candidate	Votes	%
Republican	James Strickler (incumbent)	5,935	100%
Total votes		5,935	100%
Republican hold			

=== District 3 ===
Incumbent Republican Paul Bandy has represented the 3rd district since 2007.

New Mexico House of Representatives 3rd district general election, 2010
Party	Candidate	Votes	%
Republican	Paul Bandy (incumbent)	6,997	100%
Total votes		6,997	100%
Republican hold			

=== District 4 ===
Incumbent Democrat Ray Begaye has represented the 4th district since 1999.

New Mexico House of Representatives 4th district general election, 2010
Party	Candidate	Votes	%
Democratic	Ray Begaye (incumbent)	5,383	100%
Total votes		5,383	100%
Democratic hold			

=== District 5 ===
Incumbent Democrat Sandra Jeff has represented the 5th district since 2009. Democratic primary

New Mexico House of Representatives 5th district Democratic primary election, 2010
Party	Candidate	Votes	%
Democratic	Sandra Jeff (incumbent)	1,222	42.98%
Democratic	Billy Moore	1,030	36.23%
Democratic	Irvin Harrison	591	20.79%
Total votes		2,843	100%

General election

New Mexico House of Representatives 5th district general election, 2010
Party	Candidate	Votes	%
Democratic	Sandra Jeff (incumbent)	5,112	100%
Total votes		5,112	100%
Democratic hold			

=== District 6 ===
Incumbent Democrat Eliseo Alcon has represented the 6th district since 2009.

New Mexico House of Representatives 6th district general election, 2010
Party	Candidate	Votes	%
Democratic	Eliseo Alcon (incumbent)	4,838	100%
Total votes		4,838	100%
Democratic hold			

=== District 7 ===
Incumbent Democrat Andrew Barreras has represented the 7th district since 2007. Barreras lost re-election to Republican David Chavez. Democratic primary

New Mexico House of Representatives 7th district Democratic primary election, 2010
Party	Candidate	Votes	%
Democratic	Andrew Barreras (incumbent)	1,266	56.98%
Democratic	Benny Hodges	956	43.02%
Total votes		2,222	100%

General election

New Mexico House of Representatives 7th district general election, 2010
Party	Candidate	Votes	%
Republican	David Chavez	4,788	54.87%
Democratic	Andrew Barreras (incumbent)	3,938	45.13%
Total votes		8,726	100%
Republican gain from Democratic			

=== District 8 ===
Incumbent Democrat Elias Barela has represented the 8th district since 2007. Barela lost re-nomination to fellow Democrat Julian Luna. Luna lost the general election to Republican Alonzo Baldonado. Democratic primary

New Mexico House of Representatives 8th district Democratic primary election, 2010
Party	Candidate	Votes	%
Democratic	Julian Luna	1,398	53.14%
Democratic	Elias Barela (incumbent)	1,233	46.86%
Total votes		2,631	100%

General election

New Mexico House of Representatives 8th district general election, 2010
Party	Candidate	Votes	%
Republican	Alonzo Baldonado	4,588	53.45%
Democratic	Julian Luna	3,995	46.55%
Total votes		8,583	100%
Republican gain from Democratic			

=== District 9 ===
Incumbent Democrat Patricia Lundstrom has represented the 9th district since 2003. Democratic primary

New Mexico House of Representatives 9th district Democratic primary election, 2010
Party	Candidate	Votes	%
Democratic	Patricia Lundstrom (incumbent)	1,559	67.40%
Democratic	Yolanda Ahasteen-Azua	754	32.60%
Total votes		2,313	100%
Democratic hold			

General election

New Mexico House of Representatives 9th district general election, 2010
Party	Candidate	Votes	%
Democratic	Patricia Lundstrom (incumbent)	4,340	100%
Total votes		4,340	100%
Democratic hold			

=== District 10 ===
Incumbent Democrat Henry Saavedra has represented the 10th district since 1977.

New Mexico House of Representatives 10th district general election, 2010
Party	Candidate	Votes	%
Democratic	Henry Saavedra (incumbent)	4,093	100%
Total votes		4,093	100%
Democratic hold			

=== District 11 ===
Incumbent Democrat Rick Miera has represented the 11th district since 1991.

New Mexico House of Representatives 11th district general election, 2010
Party	Candidate	Votes	%
Democratic	Rick Miera (incumbent)	6,602	100%
Total votes		6,602	100%
Democratic hold			

=== District 12 ===
Incumbent Democrat Ernest Chavez has represented the 12th district since 2005.

New Mexico House of Representatives 12th district general election, 2010
Party	Candidate	Votes	%
Democratic	Ernest Chavez (incumbent)	3,945	58.26%
Republican	Clyde Wheeler	2,317	34.22%
Independent	Robert Schiller	509	7.52%
Total votes		6,771	100%
Democratic hold			

=== District 13 ===
Incumbent Democrat Eleanor Chavez has represented the 13th district since 2009. Democratic primary

New Mexico House of Representatives 13th district Democratic primary election, 2010
Party	Candidate	Votes	%
Democratic	Eleanor Chavez (incumbent)	963	56.91%
Democratic	Matthew Archuleta	729	43.09%
Total votes		1,692	100%

General election

New Mexico House of Representatives 13th district general election, 2010
Party	Candidate	Votes	%
Democratic	Eleanor Chavez (incumbent)	5,679	100%
Total votes		5,679	100%
Democratic hold			

=== District 14 ===
Incumbent Democrat Miguel Garcia has represented the 14th district since 1997. Democratic primary

New Mexico House of Representatives 14th district Democratic primary election, 2010
Party	Candidate	Votes	%
Democratic	Miguel Garcia (incumbent)	1,201	69.46%
Democratic	Michael Atler Sr.	528	30.54%
Total votes		1,729	100%

General election

New Mexico House of Representatives 14th district general election, 2010
Party	Candidate	Votes	%
Democratic	Miguel Garcia (incumbent)	4,187	70.61%
Republican	Clara Pena	1,743	29.39%
Total votes		5,930	100%
Democratic hold			

=== District 15 ===
Incumbent Democrat Bill O'Neill has represented the 15th district since 2009.

New Mexico House of Representatives 15th district general election, 2010
Party	Candidate	Votes	%
Democratic	Bill O'Neill (incumbent)	5,545	50.77%
Republican	Justin Alexander Horwitz	5,376	49.23%
Total votes		10,921	100%
Democratic hold			

=== District 16 ===
Incumbent Democrat Moe Maestas has represented the 16th district since 2007.

New Mexico House of Representatives 16th district general election, 2010
Party	Candidate	Votes	%
Democratic	Moe Maestas (incumbent)	5,875	100%
Total votes		5,875	100%
Democratic hold			

=== District 17 ===
Incumbent Democrat Edward Sandoval has represented the 17th district since 1983.

New Mexico House of Representatives 17th district general election, 2010
Party	Candidate	Votes	%
Democratic	Edward Sandoval (incumbent)	7,459	100%
Total votes		7,459	100%
Democratic hold			

=== District 18 ===
Incumbent Democrat Gail Chasey has represented the 18th district since 1997.

New Mexico House of Representatives 18th district general election, 2010
Party	Candidate	Votes	%
Democratic	Gail Chasey (incumbent)	6,608	100%
Total votes		6,608	100%
Democratic hold			

=== District 19 ===
Incumbent Democrat Sheryl Williams Stapleton has represented the 19th district since 1995.

New Mexico House of Representatives 19th district general election, 2010
Party	Candidate	Votes	%
Democratic	Sheryl Williams Stapleton (incumbent)	4,558	68.11%
Republican	Anthony Lawrence Romo	1,610	24.06%
Libertarian	Mark Austin Curtis	524	7.83%
Total votes		6,692	100%
Democratic hold			

=== District 20 ===
Incumbent Republican James White has represented the 20th district since his appointment in 2009, following the resignation of Richard Berry, who had resigned after being elected Mayor of Albuquerque. White was elected to a full term.

New Mexico House of Representatives 20th district general election, 2010
Party	Candidate	Votes	%
Republican	James White (incumbent)	7,667	100%
Total votes		7,667	100%
Republican hold			

=== District 21 ===
Incumbent Democrat Mimi Stewart has represented the 21st district since 2009.

New Mexico House of Representatives 21st district general election, 2010
Party	Candidate	Votes	%
Democratic	Mimi Stewart (incumbent)	3,122	52.09%
Republican	Antoinette Marie Baca	2,871	47.91%
Total votes		5,993	100%
Democratic hold			

=== District 22 ===
Incumbent Republican Kathy McCoy has represented the 22nd district since 2005. McCoy didn't seek re-elecxtion and fellow Republican James Smith won the open seat. Republican primary

New Mexico House of Representatives 22nd district Republican primary election, 2010
Party	Candidate	Votes	%
Republican	James Smith	1,927	52.84%
Republican	Daniel Allen Salzwedel	1,720	47.16%
Total votes		3,647	100%

General election

New Mexico House of Representatives 22nd district general election, 2010
Party	Candidate	Votes	%
Republican	James Smith	9,388	100%
Total votes		9,388	100%
Republican hold			

=== District 23 ===
Incumbent Democrat Benjamin Rodefer has represented the 23rd district since 2009. Rodefer lost re-election to Republican David Doyle. Republican primary

New Mexico House of Representatives 23rd district Republican primary election, 2010
Party	Candidate	Votes	%
Republican	David Doyle	1,336	49.89%
Republican	Paul Pacheco	1,009	37.68%
Republican	Thomas Molitor	333	12.43%
Total votes		2,678	100%

General election

New Mexico House of Representatives 23rd district general election, 2010
Party	Candidate	Votes	%
Republican	David Doyle	6,429	54.12%
Democratic	Benjamin Rodefer (incumbent)	5,450	45.88%
Total votes		11,879	100%
Republican gain from Democratic			

=== District 24 ===
Incumbent Republican Janice Arnold-Jones has represented the 24th district since 2003. Arnold-Jones retired to run for Governor and fellow Republican Conrad James won the open seat.

New Mexico House of Representatives 24th district general election, 2010
Party	Candidate	Votes	%
Republican	Conrad James	6,366	100%
Total votes		6,366	100%
Republican hold			

=== District 25 ===
Incumbent Democrat Danice Picraux has represented the 25th district since 1991.

New Mexico House of Representatives 25th district general election, 2010
Party	Candidate	Votes	%
Democratic	Danice Picraux (incumbent)	5,628	64.34%
Republican	Jennifer Thornburg	3,119	35.66%
Total votes		8,747	100%
Democratic hold			

=== District 26 ===
Incumbent Democrat Al Park has represented the 26th district since 2001.

New Mexico House of Representatives 26th district general election, 2010
Party	Candidate	Votes	%
Democratic	Al Park (incumbent)	3,026	62.05%
Republican	Larry Kennedy	1,851	37.95%
Total votes		4,877	100%
Democratic hold			

=== District 27 ===
Incumbent Republican Larry Larrañaga has represented the 27th district since 1995.

New Mexico House of Representatives 27th district general election, 2010
Party	Candidate	Votes	%
Republican	Larry Larrañaga (incumbent)	9,680	100%
Total votes		9,680	100%
Republican hold			

=== District 28 ===
Incumbent Republican Jimmie Hall has represented the 28th district since 2005. Republican primary

New Mexico House of Representatives 28th district Republican primary election, 2010
Party	Candidate	Votes	%
Republican	Jimmie Hall (incumbent)	2,292	84.17%
Republican	Lee Richard Gonzales	431	15.83%
Total votes		2,723	100%

General election

New Mexico House of Representatives 28th district general election, 2010
Party	Candidate	Votes	%
Republican	Jimmie Hall (incumbent)	6,170	60.90%
Democratic	Cornelia Wells Lange	3,961	39.10%
Total votes		10,131	100%
Republican hold			

=== District 29 ===
Incumbent Republican Thomas Anderson has represented the 29th district since 2003.

New Mexico House of Representatives 29th district general election, 2010
Party	Candidate	Votes	%
Republican	Thomas Anderson (incumbent)	9,274	59.13%
Democratic	Alexander Russell	6,410	40.87%
Total votes		15,684	100%
Republican hold			

=== District 30 ===
Incumbent Democrat Karen Giannini has represented the 30th district since 2009. Giannini lost re-election to Republican Nate Gentry.

New Mexico House of Representatives 30th district general election, 2010
Party	Candidate	Votes	%
Republican	Nate Gentry	5,634	58.11%
Democratic	Karen Giannini (incumbent)	4,061	41.89%
Total votes		9,695	100%
Republican gain from Democratic			

=== District 31 ===
Incumbent Republican Bill Rehm has represented the 31st district since 2007.

New Mexico House of Representatives 31st district general election, 2010
Party	Candidate	Votes	%
Republican	Bill Rehm (incumbent)	8,184	63.17%
Democratic	Michael Malloy	4,771	36.83%
Total votes		12,955	100%
Republican hold			

=== District 32 ===
Incumbent Democrat Dona Irwin has represented the 32nd district since 1999. Republican primary

New Mexico House of Representatives 32nd district Republican primary, 2010
Party	Candidate	Votes	%
Republican	Thomas Walker	593	50.81%
Republican	Philip Skinner	574	49.19%
Total votes		1,167	100%

General election

New Mexico House of Representatives 32nd district general election, 2010
Party	Candidate	Votes	%
Democratic	Dona Irwin (incumbent)	3,464	56.92%
Republican	Thomas Walker	2,622	43.08%
Total votes		6,086	100%
Democratic hold			

=== District 33 ===
Incumbent Democrat Joni Gutierrez has represented the 33rd district since 2005.

New Mexico House of Representatives 33rd district general election, 2010
Party	Candidate	Votes	%
Democratic	Joni Gutierrez (incumbent)	4,326	61.92%
Republican	Virginia Robertson	2,660	38.08%
Total votes		6,986	100%
Democratic hold			

=== District 34 ===
Incumbent Democrat Mary Helen Garcia has represented the 34th district since 1997.

New Mexico House of Representatives 34th district general election, 2010
Party	Candidate	Votes	%
Democratic	Mary Helen Garcia (incumbent)	2,860	100%
Total votes		2,860	100%
Democratic hold			

=== District 35 ===
Incumbent Democrat Antonio Luján has represented the 35th district since 2003.

New Mexico House of Representatives 35th district general election, 2010
Party	Candidate	Votes	%
Democratic	Antonio Luján (incumbent)	3,797	100%
Total votes		3,797	100%
Democratic hold			

=== District 36 ===
Incumbent Democrat Andy Nuñez has represented the 36th district since 2001. Democratic primary

New Mexico House of Representatives 36th district Democratic primary election, 2010
Party	Candidate	Votes	%
Democratic	Andy Nuñez (incumbent)	718	52.10%
Democratic	Gilbert Apodaca	404	29.32%
Democratic	Nicole Parra-Perez	256	18.58%
Total votes		1,378	100%

General election

New Mexico House of Representatives 36th district general election, 2010
Party	Candidate	Votes	%
Democratic	Andy Nuñez (incumbent)	4,277	55.82%
Republican	Debra White	3,385	44.18%
Total votes		7,662	100%
Democratic hold			

=== District 37 ===
Incumbent Democrat Jeff Steinborn has represented the 37th district since 2007. Steinborn lost re-election to Republican Terry McMillan. Republican primary

New Mexico House of Representatives 37th district Republican primary election, 2010
Party	Candidate	Votes	%
Republican	Terry McMillan	1,756	81.07%
Republican	Doyle Pruitt	410	18.93%
Total votes		2,166	100%

General election

New Mexico House of Representatives 37th district general election, 2010
Party	Candidate	Votes	%
Republican	Terry McMillan	6,110	51.44%
Democratic	Jeff Steinborn (incumbent)	5,767	48.56%
Total votes		11,877	100%
Republican gain from Democratic			

=== District 38 ===
Incumbent Republican Dianne Hamilton has represented the 38th district since 1999. Republican primary

New Mexico House of Representatives 38th district Republican primary election, 2010
Party	Candidate	Votes	%
Republican	Dianne Hamilton (incumbent)	1,548	68.83%
Republican	Trent Petty	701	31.17%
Total votes		2,249	100%

General election

New Mexico House of Representatives 38th district general election, 2010
Party	Candidate	Votes	%
Republican	Dianne Hamilton (incumbent)	6,384	100%
Total votes		6,384	100%
Republican hold			

=== District 39 ===
Incumbent Democrat Rodolpho Martinez has represented the 39th district since 2007. Democratic primary

New Mexico House of Representatives 39th district general election, 2010
Party	Candidate	Votes	%
Democratic	Rodolpho Martinez (incumbent)	2,159	62.08%
Democratic	Gilbert Guadiana	1,319	37.92%
Total votes		3,478	100%

Republican primary

New Mexico House of Representatives 39th district general election, 2010
Party	Candidate	Votes	%
Republican	Linda Pecotte	583	54.08%
Republican	Charles William Cassady	495	45.92%
Total votes		1,078	100%

General election

New Mexico House of Representatives 39th district general election, 2010
Party	Candidate	Votes	%
Democratic	Rodolpho Martinez (incumbent)	4,118	55.94%
Republican	Linda Pecotte	3,243	44.06%
Total votes		7,361	100%
Democratic hold			

=== District 40 ===
Incumbent Democrat Nick Salazar has represented the 40th district since 1974.

New Mexico House of Representatives 40th district general election, 2010
Party	Candidate	Votes	%
Democratic	Nick Salazar (incumbent)	5,962	100%
Total votes		5,962	100%
Democratic hold			

=== District 41 ===
Incumbent Democrat Debbie Rodella has represented the 41st district since 1993.

New Mexico House of Representatives 41st district general election, 2010
Party	Candidate	Votes	%
Democratic	Debbie Rodella (incumbent)	5,175	100%
Total votes		5,175	100%
Democratic hold			

=== District 42 ===
Incumbent Democrat Roberto Gonzales has represented the 42nd district since 1995.

New Mexico House of Representatives 42nd district general election, 2010
Party	Candidate	Votes	%
Democratic	Roberto Gonzales (incumbent)	7,834	78.94%
Republican	Matthew John Nielsen	2,090	21.06%
Total votes		9,924	100%
Democratic hold			

=== District 43 ===
Incumbent Republican Jeannette Wallace has represented the 43rd district since 1991. Democratic primary

New Mexico House of Representatives 43rd district Democratic primary election, 2010
Party	Candidate	Votes	%
Democratic	Stephanie Garcia Richard	1,299	59.56%
Democratic	Peter Sheehey	882	40.44%
Total votes		2,181	100%

General election

New Mexico House of Representatives 43rd district general election, 2010
Party	Candidate	Votes	%
Republican	Jeannette Wallace (incumbent)	5,550	50.87%
Democratic	Stephanie Garcia Richard	5,360	49.13%
Total votes		10,910	100%
Republican hold			

=== District 44 ===
Incumbent Republican Jane Powdrell-Culbert has represented the 44th district since 2003.

New Mexico House of Representatives 44th district general election, 2010
Party	Candidate	Votes	%
Republican	Jane Powdrell-Culbert (incumbent)	9,960	62.78%
Democratic	Joel Davis	5,905	37.22%
Total votes		15,865	100%
Republican hold			

=== District 45 ===
Incumbent Democrat Jim Trujillo has represented the 45th district since 2003.

New Mexico House of Representatives 45th district general election, 2010
Party	Candidate	Votes	%
Democratic	Jim Trujillo (incumbent)	5,853	100%
Total votes		5,853	100%
Democratic hold			

=== District 46 ===
Incumbent Democrat House Speaker Ben Luján has represented the 46th district since 1975. Democratic primary

New Mexico House of Representatives 46th district Democratic primary election, 2010
Party	Candidate	Votes	%
Democratic	Ben Luján (incumbent)	2,140	51.00%
Democratic	Carl Trujillo	2,056	49.00%
Total votes		4,196	100%

General election

New Mexico House of Representatives 46th district general election, 2010
Party	Candidate	Votes	%
Democratic	Ben Luján (incumbent)	7,960	100%
Total votes		7,960	100%
Democratic hold			

=== District 47 ===
Incumbent Democrat Brian Egolf has represented the 47th district since 2009.

New Mexico House of Representatives 47th district general election, 2010
Party	Candidate	Votes	%
Democratic	Brian Egolf (incumbent)	11,256	75.93%
Republican	Brigette Russell	3,568	24.07%
Total votes		14,824	100%
Democratic hold			

=== District 48 ===
Incumbent Democrat Lucky Varela has represented the 48th district since 1987.

New Mexico House of Representatives 48th district general election, 2010
Party	Candidate	Votes	%
Democratic	Lucky Varela (incumbent)	7,776	78.51%
Republican	Bob Walsh	2,128	21.49%
Total votes		9,904	100%
Democratic hold			

=== District 49 ===
Incumbent Republican Don Tripp has represented the 49th district since 1999.

New Mexico House of Representatives 49th district general election, 2010
Party	Candidate	Votes	%
Republican	Don Tripp (incumbent)	8,089	100%
Total votes		8,089	100%
Republican hold			

=== District 50 ===
Incumbent Democrat Rhonda Sue King has represented the 50th district since 1999.

New Mexico House of Representatives 50th district general election, 2010
Party	Candidate	Votes	%
Democratic	Rhonda Sue King (incumbent)	6,131	60.36%
Republican	Leroy Candelaria	4,027	39.64%
Total votes		10,158	100%
Democratic hold			

=== District 51 ===
Incumbent Republican Gloria Vaughn has represented the 51st district since 1995. Vaughn lost re-nomination to fellow Republican Yvette Herrell, who went on to win the general election. Democratic primary

New Mexico House of Representatives 51st district Democratic primary election, 2010
Party	Candidate	Votes	%
Democratic	Susan Medina	360	52.10%
Democratic	Joe Ferguson	331	47.90%
Total votes		691	100%

Republican primary

New Mexico House of Representatives 51st district Republican primary election, 2010
Party	Candidate	Votes	%
Republican	Yvette Herrell	846	54.23%
Republican	Gloria Vaughn (incumbent)	714	45.77%
Total votes		1,560	100%

General election

New Mexico House of Representatives 51st district general election, 2010
Party	Candidate	Votes	%
Republican	Yvette Herrell	3,077	62.92%
Democratic	Susan Medina	1,813	37.08%
Total votes		4,890	100%
Republican hold			

=== District 52 ===
Incumbent Democrat Joe Cervantes has represented the 52nd district since 2001.

New Mexico House of Representatives 52nd district general election, 2010
Party	Candidate	Votes	%
Democratic	Joe Cervantes (incumbent)	4,110	100%
Total votes		4,110	100%
Democratic hold			

=== District 53 ===
Incumbent Democrat Nate Cote has represented the 53rd district since 2007. Cote lost re-election to Republican Ricky Little.

New Mexico House of Representatives 53rd district general election, 2010
Party	Candidate	Votes	%
Republican	Ricky Little	3,753	52.91%
Democratic	Nate Cote (incumbent)	3,340	47.09%
Total votes		7,093	100%
Republican gain from Democratic			

=== District 54 ===
Incumbent Republican Bill Gray has represented the 54th district since 2007.

New Mexico House of Representatives 54th district general election, 2010
Party	Candidate	Votes	%
Republican	Bill Gray (incumbent)	3,858	100%
Total votes		3,858	100%
Republican hold			

=== District 55 ===
Incumbent Democrat John Heaton has represented the 55th district since 1997. Heaton lost re-election to Republican Cathrynn Brown.

New Mexico House of Representatives 55th district general election, 2010
Party	Candidate	Votes	%
Republican	Cathrynn Brown	4,010	52.19%
Democratic	John Heaton (incumbent)	3,673	47.81%
Total votes		7,683	100%
Republican gain from Democratic			

=== District 56 ===
Incumbent Republican Zachary Cook has represented the 56th district since 2009.

New Mexico House of Representatives 56th district general election, 2010
Party	Candidate	Votes	%
Republican	Zachary Cook (incumbent)	5,620	100%
Total votes		5,620	100%
Republican hold			

=== District 57 ===
Incumbent Republican Dennis Kintigh has represented the 57th district since 2009.

New Mexico House of Representatives 57th district general election, 2010
Party	Candidate	Votes	%
Republican	Dennis Kintigh (incumbent)	7,950	100%
Total votes		7,950	100%
Republican hold			

=== District 58 ===
Incumbent Republican Candy Ezzell has represented the 58th district since 2005.

New Mexico House of Representatives 58th district general election, 2010
Party	Candidate	Votes	%
Republican	Candy Ezzell (incumbent)	3,036	64.91%
Democratic	Michael Trujillo	1,641	35.09%
Total votes		4,677	100%
Republican hold			

=== District 59 ===
Incumbent Republican Nora Espinoza has represented the 59th district since 2007. Democratic primary

New Mexico House of Representatives 59th district Democratic primary election, 2010
Party	Candidate	Votes	%
Democratic	Ellen Wedum	402	53.89%
Democratic	Charles Berry	344	46.11%
Total votes		746	100%

General election

New Mexico House of Representatives 59th district general election, 2010
Party	Candidate	Votes	%
Republican	Nora Espinoza (incumbent)	5,337	72.12%
Democratic	Ellen Wedum	2,063	27.88%
Total votes		7,400	100%
Republican hold			

=== District 60 ===
Incumbent Democrat Jack Thomas has represented the 60th district since 2009. Thomas lost re-election to Republican Tim Lewis.

New Mexico House of Representatives 60th district general election, 2010
Party	Candidate	Votes	%
Republican	Tim Lewis	6,980	60.86%
Democratic	Jack Thomas (incumbent)	4,489	39.14%
Total votes		11,469	100%
Republican gain from Democratic			

=== District 61 ===
Incumbent Republican Shirley Tyler has represented the 61st district since 2007.

New Mexico House of Representatives 61st district general election, 2010
Party	Candidate	Votes	%
Republican	Shirley Tyler (incumbent)	3,237	100%
Total votes		3,237	100%
Republican hold			

=== District 62 ===
Incumbent Republican Donald Bratton has represented the 62nd district since 2001.

New Mexico House of Representatives 62nd district general election, 2010
Party	Candidate	Votes	%
Republican	Donald Bratton (incumbent)	6,583	100%
Total votes		6,583	100%
Republican hold			

=== District 63 ===
Incumbent Democrat Jose Campos II has represented the 63rd district since 2003. Campos didn't seek re-election and fellow Democrat George Dodge Jr. won the open seat. Democratic primary

New Mexico House of Representatives 63rd district Democratic primary election, 2010
Party	Candidate	Votes	%
Democratic	George Dodge Jr.	1,450	78.00%
Democratic	Jose Griego	409	22.00%
Total votes		1,859	100%

General election

New Mexico House of Representatives 63rd district general election, 2010
Party	Candidate	Votes	%
Democratic	George Dodge Jr.	2,638	54.52%
Republican	Melinda Joy Russ	2,201	45.48%
Total votes		4,839	100%
Democratic hold			

=== District 64 ===
Incumbent Republican Anna Crook has represented the 64th district since 1995. Republican primary

New Mexico House of Representatives 64th district Republican primary election, 2010
Party	Candidate	Votes	%
Republican	Anna Crook (incumbent)	1,954	86.69%
Republican	Wade Lopez	300	13.31%
Total votes		2,254	100%

General election

New Mexico House of Representatives 64th district general election, 2010
Party	Candidate	Votes	%
Republican	Anna Crook (incumbent)	5,529	100%
Total votes		5,529	100%
Republican hold			

=== District 65 ===
Incumbent Democrat James Madalena has represented the 65th district since 1985.

New Mexico House of Representatives 65th district general election, 2010
Party	Candidate	Votes	%
Democratic	James Madalena (incumbent)	5,066	100%
Total votes		5,066	100%
Democratic hold			

=== District 66 ===
Incumbent Republican Keith Gardner has represented the 66th district since 2005.

New Mexico House of Representatives 66th district general election, 2010
Party	Candidate	Votes	%
Republican	Keith Gardner (incumbent)	5,719	100%
Total votes		5,719	100%
Republican hold			

=== District 67 ===
Incumbent Republican Dennis Roch has represented the 67th district since 2009.

New Mexico House of Representatives 67th district general election, 2010
Party	Candidate	Votes	%
Republican	Dennis Roch (incumbent)	5,862	100%
Total votes		5,862	100%
Republican hold			

=== District 68 ===
Incumbent Democrat Thomas Garcia has represented the 68th district since 2007.

New Mexico House of Representatives 68th district general election, 2010
Party	Candidate	Votes	%
Democratic	Thomas Garcia (incumbent)	6,690	100%
Total votes		6,690	100%
Democratic hold			

=== District 69 ===
Incumbent Democrat and Majority Leader Ken Martinez had represented the 69th district since 1999.

New Mexico House of Representatives 69th district general election, 2010
Party	Candidate	Votes	%
Democratic	Ken Martinez (incumbent)	5,379	100%
Total votes		5,379	100%
Democratic hold			

=== District 70 ===
Incumbent Democrat Richard Vigil has represented the 70th district since 1999. Democratic primary

New Mexico House of Representatives 70th district Democratic primary election, 2010
Party	Candidate	Votes	%
Democratic	Richard Vigil (incumbent)	2,075	47.98%
Democratic	Barbara Perea Casey	1,648	38.10%
Democratic	Chris Lopez	323	7.47%
Democratic	Eric Cummings	279	6.45%
Total votes		4,325	100%

General election

New Mexico House of Representatives 70th district general election, 2010
Party	Candidate	Votes	%
Democratic	Richard Vigil (incumbent)	4,769	64.98%
Republican	Mel Root	2,570	35.02%
Total votes		7,339	100%
Democratic hold			

== See also ==
- 2010 United States elections
- 2010 United States House of Representatives elections in New Mexico
- Elections in New Mexico
