= Ernest Chavez =

Ernest Chavez may refer to:

- Ernest Chavez (politician)
- Ernest Chavez (fighter)
