= Joe Steele =

Joe Steele may refer to:

- Joe Steele (American football) (born 1958), American football player
- Joe Steele (musician) (1899–1964), American jazz pianist and bandleader
- Joe Steele, a criminal involved in Glasgow Ice Cream Wars
- Joe Steele (novel), and the eponymous character
- Joe Steele (composer) (dates unknown), classical music composer
- Joe Steele (footballer) (1928-1993), Scottish footballer, see List of Bury F.C. players (1–24 appearances)

== See also ==
- Joseph Steele (1881–?), carpenter and political figure in Nova Scotia, Canada
- Joe Stell (born 1928), American politician in the New Mexico House of Representatives
