= Mary Garcia =

Mary Garcia may refer to:

- Mary Helen Garcia (born 1937), member of the New Mexico House of Representatives
- Mary Jane Garcia (born 1936), member of the New Mexico Senate
