= Gregory Zanetti =

United States Army general

Greg Zanetti
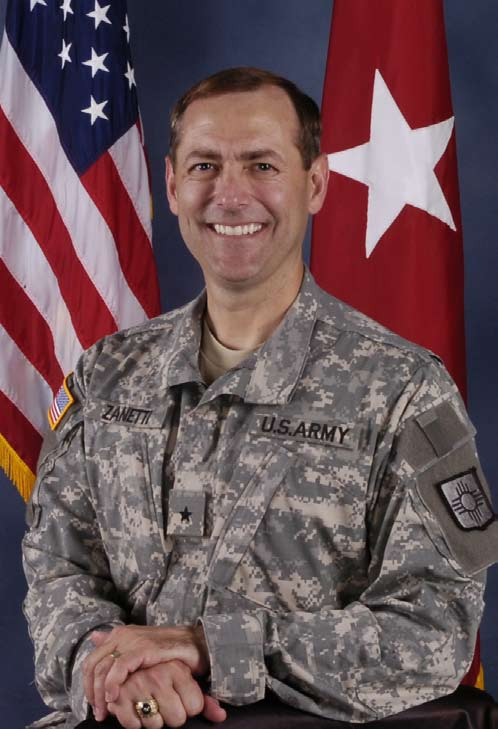

Personal details
- Born: Gregory Zanetti
- Spouse: Teresa Zanetti
- Education: United States Military Academy (BS); Boston University (MBA); Army War College (MSS)

Military service
- Allegiance: United States
- Branch/service: United States Army
- Rank: Brigadier General
- Unit: New Mexico National Guard

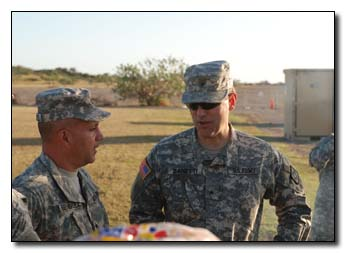
Zanetti in Guantanamo

Gregory J. "Greg" Zanetti is an American retired officer of the United States Army National Guard, financial advisor, and political candidate.

== Early life and education ==
Zanetti was raised in Albuquerque, New Mexico and graduated from Valley High School in 1976. He earned a Bachelor of Science degree from the United States Military Academy, a Master of Business Administration from Boston University, and a Master of Strategic Studies from the United States Army War College.

== Career ==
Zanetti served as deputy commander of Joint Task Force Guantanamo. On August 13, 2008 Zanetti testified at a pre-trial hearing prior to Guantanamo captive Mohamed Jawad's Guantanamo military commission. Zanetti's Guantanamo tenure ended in January 2009.

On June 14, 2021, he announced his candidacy in the 2022 New Mexico gubernatorial election as a Republican.

== Personal life ==
Zanetti is married to Teresa Zanetti, a former state Representative; they have two sons.
