= Samuel Vigil =

American politician

Member of the New Mexico House of Representatives from the 70th district
- In office 1970–1998
- Succeeded by: Richard Vigil

Personal details
- Born: Samuel Felix Vigil Jr. November 20, 1929 New Mexico, U.S.
- Died: December 7, 2019 (aged 90) Las Vegas, New Mexico, U.S.
- Party: Democratic
- Education: New Mexico Highlands University

Samuel Felix Vigil Jr. (November 20, 1929 – December 7, 2019) was an American politician. A member of the Democratic Party, he served in the New Mexico House of Representatives from 1970 to 1998.

== Life and career ==
Vigil was born in New Mexico, the son of Samuel Vigil Sr. and Maclovia Sanchez Lujan. He served as a medic in the United States Army during the Korean War, which after his discharge, he served in the New Mexico National Guard. After his service in the national guard, he attended New Mexico Highlands University, earning his BA degree in 1956.

Virgil served in the New Mexico House of Representatives from 1970 to 1998. During his service in the House, in 1976, he founded Luna Community College, a public community college in Las Vegas, New Mexico. He served as its college's president until 1999.

== Death ==
Vigil died on December 7, 2019, of natural causes in Las Vegas, New Mexico, at the age of 90. He was buried in Santa Fe National Cemetery.
