= Kandy Cordova =

American politician (1936–2023)

Member of the New Mexico House of Representatives from the 7th district
- In office 2001–2007

Personal details
- Born: August 13, 1936 Belen, New Mexico, U.S.
- Died: April 21, 2023 (aged 86) Belen, New Mexico, U.S.
- Party: Democratic

Candelaria "Kandy" Sanchez Cordova (August 13, 1936 – April 21, 2023) was an American politician. She served in the New Mexico House of Representatives for District 7 from 2001 to 2007.
