= Dennis Kintigh =

American politician

Mayor of Roswell
- In office March 2014 – March 2022
- Preceded by: Del Jurney
- Succeeded by: Timothy Jennings

Member of the New Mexico House of Representatives from the 57th district
- In office January 1, 2009 – January 1, 2013
- Preceded by: Daniel R. Foley
- Succeeded by: Jason Harper

Personal details
- Born: May 1, 1952 (age 73) Greensburg, Pennsylvania
- Party: Republican

Dennis Kintigh (born May 1, 1952) is an American politician who served in the New Mexico House of Representatives from the 57th district from 2009 to 2013 and as Mayor of Roswell from 2014 to 2022.
