= Justine Fox-Young =

American politician (born 1979)

Justine Fox-Young (born 1979) is a Republican former member of the New Mexico House of Representatives, serving District 30. She was first elected in 2004, and was re-elected in 2006. Fox-Young was defeated in 2008 by Democratic newcomer Karen Giannini. She received her J.D. degree from the University of Chicago and her undergraduate degree from Brown University.

== Legislative career ==
In 2004, Fox-Young won a tough primary against incumbent State Representative Bob White to become the youngest sitting member and the youngest woman ever elected to the New Mexico Legislature. At the time, Fox-Young was the office manager for attorney Mickey D. Barnett, a former Republican National Committeeman from New Mexico.

Although Fox-Young initially earned a reputation as a moderate Republican, her vote on a controversial bill approving domestic partnerships caused some to view her as ideologically liberal. She was one of only two New Mexico House Republicans to vote for the measure.

After the 2008 primary election, in which she ran uncontested, Fox-Young claimed to have proof of voter fraud in the Democratic primary races. Soon after, voters whose registrations Fox-Young claimed were fraudulent began to challenge her allegations. The government watchdog group Common Cause said her claims were "simply inaccurate."

The American Civil Liberties Union sued Fox-Young for invasion of privacy, conspiracy and negligence. All the charges against her were later dismissed.

In 2008, Fox-Young was defeated by Giannini for the House seat. The defeat came as a surprise to many, since the seat was viewed as a "safe" Republican seat.

== Notes and references ==
New Mexico House of Representatives
| Preceded by Robert W. White | Member of the New Mexico House of Representatives from the 30th district 2005–2009 | Succeeded by Karen E. Giannini |
