= Eliseo Alcon =

American politician (1951–2025)

Member of the New Mexico House of Representatives from the 6th district
- In office January 1, 2009 – November 25, 2024
- Preceded by: George Hanosh
- Succeeded by: Martha Garcia

Personal details
- Born: January 28, 1950
- Died: January 13, 2025 (aged 74)
- Party: Democratic

Eliseo Lee Alcon (January 28, 1950 – January 13, 2025) was an American politician who served as a member of the New Mexico House of Representatives from the 6th district. Elected in 2008, he assumed office in January 2009. He resigned in November 2024 due to health concerns. Alcon died from liver cancer on January 13, 2025, at the age of 74.

== Elections ==
- 2012 Alcon was challenged in the June 5, 2012, Democratic Primary, winning with 1,584 votes (55.2%) and was unopposed for the November 6, 2012, General election, winning with 4,838 votes.
- 2008 When District 6 Democratic Representative George Hanosh retired and left the seat open, Alcon ran in the three-way June 8, 2008, Democratic Primary, winning with 1,226 votes (42.5%) and won the November 4, 2008, General election with 5,494 votes (62%) against Republican nominee R. Grant Clawson, who had run for the seat in 2006.
- 2010 Alcon was unopposed for both the June 1, 2010, Democratic Primary, winning with 1,926 votes and the November 2, 2010, General election, winning with 4,838 votes.
