= George Hanosh =

American politician and businessman

Member of the New Mexico House of Representatives from the 6th district
- In office 1998–2008
- Succeeded by: Eliseo Alcon

Personal details
- Born: January 7, 1938 Albuquerque, New Mexico, U.S.
- Died: December 7, 2008 (aged 70) Grants, New Mexico, U.S.
- Children: 8
- Education: New Mexico Highlands University (BA)

George Hanosh (January 7, 1938 – December 7, 2008) was an American politician and businessman who served as a member of the New Mexico House of Representatives from 1998 to 2008.

== Early life and education ==
Hanosh was born in Albuquerque, New Mexico. He graduated from New Mexico Highlands University.

== Career ==
After earning his bachelor's degree, Hanosh moved to Grants, New Mexico and became a car salesman and General Motors dealership owner. He eventually served as the chair of the New Mexico Automobile Dealers Association. Hanosh was a member of the New Mexico House of Representatives from 1998 to 2008. He did not seek re-election in 2008 due to an illness.

== Personal life ==
Hanosh and his wife, Barbara, had eight children. He died in Grants, New Mexico on December 7, 2008. Hanosh is the namesake of George Hanosh Blvd. in Grants.
