= Teresa Zanetti =

American politician (born 1958)

Member of the New Mexico House of Representatives from the 15th district
- In office 2003–2008
- Preceded by: John Sanchez
- Succeeded by: Bill O'Neill

Personal details
- Born: January 20, 1958 (age 68) Columbus, Georgia, U.S.
- Party: Republican
- Spouse: Gregory Zanetti
- Education: Harvard University (AB); St. John's College (MA)

Teresa A. Zanetti (born January 20, 1958) is an American politician who served as a member of the New Mexico House of Representatives from 2003 to 2008.

== Early life and education ==
Zanetti was born in Columbus, Georgia and raised in Albuquerque, New Mexico. She attended Valley High School. Zanetti earned a Bachelor of Arts degree from Harvard University and a Master of Arts from St. John's College.

== Career ==
From 1982 to 1985, Zanetti worked as a test administrator at an Army Education Center in Augsburg, Germany. In 1989 and 1990, she served as the bureau chief of the New Mexico State Department of Regulation and Licensing. From 1990 to 1997, she was a teacher at Albuquerque Academy. She was also a columnist for The Albuquerque Tribune. Zanetti was elected to the New Mexico House of Representatives in 2002 and assumed office in 2003. She served until 2008.

== Personal life ==
Zanetti's husband, Gregory Zanetti, is a retired United States Army officer and political candidate.
