= Daniel R. Foley =

American politician

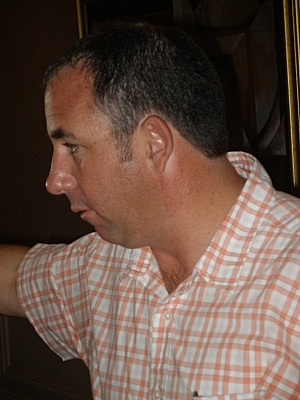
- Foley in 2006

Member of the New Mexico House of Representatives from the 57th district
- In office 1999–2009
- Succeeded by: Dennis Kintigh

Personal details
- Born: Roswell, New Mexico
- Party: Republican
- Occupation: Insurance/Business Owner

Daniel Foley is an American politician. He served as a member of the New Mexico House of Representatives for the 57th District from 1999 to 2009. He was defeated in the 2008 primary election. He was succeeded by Dennis Kintigh.

== Committee Membership ==
- Advisory- Courts, Corrections & Justice Committee (Interim)
- Advisory- Economic & Rural Development Committee (Interim)
  - Member- Interim Legislative Ethics Committee
  - Member- Judiciary Committee
  - Member- Legislative Council (Interim)
- Advisory- Legislative Health & Human Services Committee (Interim)
- Advisory- Mortgage Finance Authority Act Oversight Committee (Interim)
- Advisory- New Mexico Finance Authority Oversight Committee (Interim)
  - Member- Printing & Supplies
  - Member- Rules & Order of Business
  - Member- Voters & Elections
- Advisory- Welfare Reform Oversight Committee (Interim)

== Past Elections ==
Daniel Foley first ran for the New Mexico House of Representatives seat in November 1998 he was successful. He was unopposed until 2002, Foley won that election as well. In 2008 Foley faced an election against an opponent, Dennis J. Kintigh. Foley lost the election by 585 votes.

New Mexico House of Representatives District 57, Election 2008
Party	Candidate	Votes	%	±%
Republican	Daniel R. Foley	1,832	43.1%	
Republican	Dennis J. Kintigh	2,417	56.9%	
Majority		585		
Turnout		4,249		
Republican hold		Swing	Defeat	

New Mexico House of Representatives District 57, Election 2002
Party	Candidate	Votes	%	±%
Republican	Daniel R. Foley	5,639	67%	
Democratic	Doris Mae Cherry	2,831	33%	
Majority		2,808		
Turnout		8,470		
Republican hold		Swing		

New Mexico House of Representatives District 57, Election 1998
Party	Candidate	Votes	%	±%
Republican	Daniel R. Foley	5,134	64%	
Democratic	JoAnn S. Jaramillo	2,894	36%	
Majority		2,240		
Turnout		8,028		
Republican hold		Swing		
