= Daniel P. Silva =

American politician

Member of the New Mexico House of Representatives from the 13th district
- In office 1984–2008

Personal details
- Born: December 3, 1943 (age 82) Monticello, New Mexico, U.S.
- Party: Democratic
- Spouse: Angie Silva
- Children: 4
- Education: University of Albuquerque

Daniel P. Silva (born December 3, 1943) was an American politician who was a Democratic member of the New Mexico House of Representatives from 1984 to 2008. He holds a Bachelor of Science degree from the University of Albuquerque.
