= William Gray (New Mexico politician) =

American politician (born 1940)

Member of the New Mexico House of Representatives from the 54th district
- In office January 2007 – January 2015
- Preceded by: Joe Stell
- Succeeded by: James G. Townsend

Personal details
- Born: December 19, 1940 (age 85) Artesia, New Mexico, U.S.
- Party: Republican
- Education: New Mexico Military Institute; Texas Tech University (BS)

William 'Bill' J. Gray (born December 19, 1940, in Artesia, New Mexico) is an American politician and a Republican former member of the New Mexico House of Representatives representing District 54 since January 2007. He did not seek reelection in 2014.

== Education ==
Gray attended New Mexico Military Institute and earned his BS in industrial engineering from Texas Tech University.

== Elections ==
- 2012 Gray was unopposed for both the June 5, 2012, Republican primary, winning with 1,425 votes and the November 6, 2012, general election, winning with 7,465 votes.
- 2006 When District 54 Democratic Representative Joe Stell retired and left the seat open, Gray was unopposed for the June 6, 2006, Republican primary, winning with 417 votes and won the November 7, 2006, general election with 2,838 votes (54.8%) against Democratic nominee Christy Bourgeois.
- 2008 Gray was unopposed for both the June 8, 2008, Republican primary, winning with 982 votes and the November 4, 2008, general election, winning with 4,833 votes.
- 2010 Gray was unopposed for both the June 1, 2010, Republican primary, winning with 913 votes and the November 2, 2010, general election, winning with 3,858 votes.
