= Richard Vigil =

American politician from New Mexico

Member of the New Mexico House of Representatives from the 70th district
- In office 1999–2012
- Preceded by: Samuel Vigil
- Succeeded by: Tomás Salazar

Personal details
- Party: Democratic

Richard D. Vigil is an American politician and businessman who served as a member of the New Mexico House of Representatives for the 70th district from 1999 to 2012.

== Background ==
Vigil is a native of Ribera, New Mexico. Elected to the New Mexico House of Representatives in 1998, he assumed office in 1999. Vigil served until 2012. In the 2012 election, Vigil was defeated in the Democratic primary by Tomás Salazar.
