= Elias Barela =

American politician

Member of the New Mexico House of Representatives from the 8th district
- In office 2007–2010
- Preceded by: Alonzo Baldonado

Personal details
- Party: Democratic
- Education: University of New Mexico (JD)

Elias Barela is an American attorney and politician who served as a member of the New Mexico House of Representatives for the 8th district from 2009 to 2011.

== Background ==
Barela earned a Juris Doctor from the University of New Mexico School of Law. He has worked as a lawyer at several law firms, before founding his own law firm. He was elected to the New Mexico House of Representatives in January 2009 and assumed office in 2010. He was defeated for re-election in the 2010 Democratic primary. Barela later served on the 13th Judicial District Court Nominating Commission.
