= Lucky Varela =

American politician

Representative Lucky Varela

Member of the New Mexico House of Representatives from the 48th district
- In office January 1987 – 2016

Personal details
- Born: Luciano Varela; February 17, 1935 Pecos, New Mexico, U.S.
- Died: September 2, 2017 (aged 82) Santa Fe, New Mexico, U.S.
- Party: Democratic
- Occupation: Government official, politician

Luciano Varela (February 17, 1935 – September 2, 2017) was a Democratic member of the New Mexico House of Representatives, representing the 48th District from 1987 to 2016. Varela, who announced his retirement in 2015, sat as the deputy chair of the House Appropriations and Finance Committee as well as a member of the Health, Government and Indian Affairs Committee.

On February 12, 2016, during the legislative session, lawmakers from both sides of the aisle took time to honor the outgoing Varela, recognizing his years of service, knowledge of New Mexico and friendship.

Announcing his retirement in August 2015, Varela also endorsed his son, Jeff Varela, to succeed him. Questions about whether Jeff Varela actually lived in the district became an issue the primary campaign and he finished third of three candidates.

== Personal life ==
Varela attended the College of Santa Fe where he received a degree in accounting. He was also an alumnus of La Salle University, where he received a law degree.

He worked in consulting, investments, and as a government official. Varela was also a member of the United States Army and United States Army Reserve.

Divorced with three children and nine grandchildren. Varela died on September 2, 2017, in Santa Fe, New Mexico.
