= Joni Gutierrez =

American politician

Member of the New Mexico House of Representatives from the 33rd district
- In office 2004–2012
- Preceded by: J. Paul Taylor
- Succeeded by: Bill McCamley

Personal details
- Party: Democratic
- Occupation: Landscape Architect

Joni Gutierrez is an American politician who served as a member of the New Mexico House of Representatives from 2005 to 2013.

In 2012, Gutierrez decided against seeking re-election. She instead ran for and won a seat as the Democratic national committeewoman for New Mexico after the previous committeewoman, Mary Gail Gwaltney, decided to retire. Gutierrez is considered a potential future candidate for Congress in New Mexico's 2nd congressional district.
