= Joe Stell =

American politician (1928–2020)

Joe Stell, Jr.

Member of the New Mexico House of Representatives for the 54th district
- In office 1984–2007

Personal details
- Born: June 15, 1928 Wilson, Texas, United States
- Died: October 30, 2020 (aged 92) Carlsbad, New Mexico
- Party: Democratic
- Spouse: Verna
- Profession: teacher, rancher

Joe M Stell, Jr. (June 15, 1928 - October 30, 2020) was an American politician who was a Democratic member of the New Mexico House of Representatives from 1984 to 2007. Stell attended Southern Methodist University, Western New Mexico University and the University of New Mexico. He is a former teacher, principal and rancher.
