= Jeff Steinborn =

American politician (born 1970)

Member of the New Mexico Senate from the 36th district
- Incumbent
- Assumed office 2017
- Preceded by: Lee Cotter

Member of the New Mexico House of Representatives from the 35th district
- In office 2013–2016
- Preceded by: Antonio Lujan
- Succeeded by: Angelica Rubio

Personal details
- Born: 1970 (age 55–56) Las Cruces, New Mexico, U.S.
- Party: Democratic
- Education: University of Texas at Austin, BA in Government (1995)
- Occupation: Land conservation
- Website: JeffSteinborn.com

Jeff Steinborn (born 1970) is an American politician who has served as a Democratic member of the New Mexico State Senate since 2017.

Steinborn previously served in the New Mexico House of Representatives from 2006–10 and from 2013–17. Steinborn took office as Representative for the second time after defeating incumbent Antonio Lujan in the Democratic primary in June, 2012. In 2016 Steinborn defeated Republican incumbent Senator Lee Cotter to become the State Senator for District 36, and was re-elected in 2020 and 2024.

Steinborn has worked as an aide to former Governor Bill Richardson, a field representative for former Senator Jeff Bingaman, and was chairman of the Democratic Party of Doña Ana County. He is Executive Director of Outdoor New Mexico. In 2015 Steinborn co-founded Film Las Cruces, where he serves as Board President. The organization is credited with helping increase film production in Las Cruces and Dona Ana County. In 2023, 2024, and 2025 Las Cruces was named by MovieMaker Magazine as one of the "Best Places to Live and Work as a Moviemaker" in America.

As a legislator he has passed diverse legislation including establishing the Rio Grande Trail, the ‘Outdoor Recreation' and 'Creative Industries' Divisions of the New Mexico Economic Development Department, increased legislative and lobbying transparency, advanced clean up of abandoned uranium mine sites, increased youth participation in government, and created a new rural film incentive. Steinborn also led New Mexico's efforts to ban the transportation and storage of high level nuclear waste in the state, successfully passing legislation in the 2023 legislative session.

In the 2025 legislative session, Senator Steinborn passed the Medical Psilocybin Act into law (SB 219), making New Mexico the 3rd state in the country to create a medicinal psilocybin program, and the first to do so through the legislature (the previous two state programs in OR and CO were created through ballot initiative.)

Steinborn has been recognized for his long time advocacy for open government, being given the ‘1st Amendment Freedom’ award by the NM Foundation for Open Government, and ‘Best in Government’ award by Common Cause NM.

In his professional conservation capacity he led the campaign to establish the Organ Mountains-Desert Peaks National Monument.

== Family ==
Jeff Steinborn was born in Las Cruces, New Mexico. He has three sisters and two brothers, including his identical twin brother Daniel Steinborn.
