= James Madalena =

Member of the New Mexico House of Representatives

James Madalena Sr.

Member of the New Mexico House of Representatives from the 65th district
- In office January 1985 – January 2017
- Succeeded by: Derrick J. Lente

Personal details
- Born: October 31, 1948 (age 77) Jemez Pueblo, New Mexico
- Party: Democratic
- Education: Eastern New Mexico University

James Roger Madalena, Sr. (Jemez Pueblo, born October 31, 1948) is an American politician who served as a Democratic member of the New Mexico House of Representatives, representing District 65, from January 1985 to January 2017.

== Education ==
Madalena earned his BA from Eastern New Mexico University.

== Career ==
After serving in the New Mexico House of Representatives for over 30 years, Madelena was succeeded in 2016 by attorney and businessman Derrick J. Lente. Madelena ran for his old seat in the 2020 election but he lost in the primary 69% to 31%.
