= Al Park =

American politician

Member of the New Mexico House of Representatives from the 26th district
- In office 2001–2013
- Preceded by: Arthur C. Hawkins
- Succeeded by: Georgene Louis

Personal details
- Born: January 24, 1970 (age 56) Panama Canal Zone
- Party: Democratic
- Education: Purdue University (BA); George Washington University (JD)

Al Park (born January 24, 1970) is an American attorney, lobbyist, and politician who served as a member of the New Mexico House of Representatives for the 26th district from 2001 to 2013.

== Early life and education ==
Park was born in the Panama Canal Zone, the son of a Venezuelan mother and white father. He earned a Bachelor of Arts degree in history from Purdue University in 1992 and a Juris Doctor from the George Washington University Law School in 1995.

== Career ==
From 1995 to 1997, Park served as a law clerk for Judge John Edwards Conway. He later worked as an attorney at Jennings Haug Keleher McLeod. He was elected to the New Mexico House of Representatives in November 2000 and assumed office in January 2001. During his tenure, Park served as chair of the House Judiciary Committee. Since leaving the House in 2013, Park has worked as a lobbyist and attorney.
