= Henry Saavedra =

American politician (1936–2019)

Kiki Saávedra

Member of the New Mexico House of Representatives from the 10th district
- In office January 1977 – 2015
- Succeeded by: G. Andrés Romero

Personal details
- Born: March 6, 1936 Albuquerque, New Mexico, U.S.
- Died: January 28, 2019 (aged 82) Albuquerque, New Mexico, U.S.
- Party: Democratic
- Spouse: Charissa
- Children: nine
- Education: St. Joseph’s College
- Alma mater: University of Albuquerque
- Occupation: businessman

Henry "Kiki" Saávedra (March 6, 1936 – January 28, 2019) was a Democratic member of the New Mexico House of Representatives, representing the 10th District from 1976 to 2015. Saávedra was a businessman, having attended the University of Albuquerque. Prior to his election to the New Mexico House, he served in various positions with the city of Albuquerque, where he resided. He served on the Appropriations and Transportation House Committees and was also a veteran of the United States Air National Guard.

Saávedra did not run for re-election in 2014. He died in 2019 at the age of 81 from complications of Alzheimer's disease.
