= Nick Salazar (New Mexico politician) =

American politician (1929–2020)

Member of the New Mexico House of Representatives from the 40th district
- In office January 1, 1974 – January 1, 2019
- Succeeded by: Joseph L. Sanchez

Personal details
- Born: April 18, 1929 San Juan Pueblo, New Mexico, U.S.
- Died: October 23, 2020 (aged 91) Española, New Mexico, U.S.
- Party: Democratic

Military service
- Branch/service: United States Air Force

Nick L. Salazar (April 18, 1929 – October 23, 2020) was an American politician who served as a Democratic member of the New Mexico House of Representatives, representing the 40th District from 1974 to 2019.

== Early life and education ==
Born in San Juan Pueblo, New Mexico, Salazar attended the University of California, Santa Barbara. He served in the United States Air Force, attaining the rank of sergeant.

== Career ==
Salazar served as a county commissioner from 1964 to 1968. From 1974 to 2019, he served as a member of the New Mexico House of Representatives for the 40th district. As House members are only paid per diem, Salazar worked as a mechanical technician at the Los Alamos National Laboratory.

In 2013, Salazar was presented with a lifetime achievement award from Los Alamos National Security for his contributions to the organizations in research. Salazar is also one of the longest served state representatives in the history New Mexico.

== Personal life ==
Salazar resided in Ohkay Owingeh, New Mexico. He and his wife had three children. He died in Española, New Mexico on October 23, 2020, at the age of 91.
