= Gloria Vaughn =

American politician (1936–2020)

Member of the New Mexico House of Representatives for the 51st district
- In office 1995–2010

Personal details
- Born: June 25, 1936 Corpus Christi, Texas, U.S.
- Died: December 12, 2020 (aged 84)
- Party: Republican
- Education: Del Mar College
- Occupation: Minister

Gloria C. Vaughn (June 25, 1936 – December 12, 2020) was an American politician who was a Republican member of the New Mexico House of Representatives from 1995 to 2010. Vaughn attended Del Mar College and the Salvation Army College and was later a minister in the Salvation Army as well as a religious education director at Holloman Air Force Base.

Vaughn died in 2020.
