= Rick Miera =

American politician

Member of the New Mexico House of Representatives from the 11th district
- In office January 1991 – December 2014
- Succeeded by: Javier Martínez

Personal details
- Born: July 20, 1951 (age 75) Albuquerque, New Mexico, U.S.
- Party: Democratic
- Education: University of Albuquerque (BA, BS)

Rick S. Miera (born July 20, 1951) is an American politician who served as a member of the New Mexico House of Representatives, representing the 11th District. Miera did not seek reelection in 2014.

== Early life and education ==
Miera was born and raised in Albuquerque, New Mexico. He earned a Bachelor of Arts and Bachelor of Science degree from the University of Albuquerque.

== Career ==
Miera worked as a consultant and therapist before retiring. Miera served as a member of the New Mexico House of Representatives from 1991 to 2014. During his tenure, he served as House Majority Leader. Upon his retirement, Miera was succeeded by attorney and activist Javier Martínez. Miera announced his candidacy for Lieutenant Governor of New Mexico on June 12, 2017. In the Democratic primary, Miera placed second behind eventual winner, Howie Morales.

== Personal life ==
He is married to Bernadette Miera and has two children.
