= Antonio Luján =

American politician

Antonio Lujan

Member of the New Mexico House of Representatives from the 35th district
- In office 2002–2012
- Succeeded by: Jeff Steinborn

Personal details
- Born: April 13, 1942 (age 84)
- Party: Democratic
- Occupation: consultant
- Website: https://web.archive.org/web/20130509014434/http://re-electantonio.com/

Antonio Lujan (born April 12, 1946) is a former member of the New Mexico House of Representatives. He represented the 35th District from 2002 to 2012.
