= Ray Begaye =

American politician

Member of the New Mexico House of Representatives from the 4th district
- In office 1999–2013
- Succeeded by: Sharon Clahchischilliage

Personal details
- Born: February 15, 1954 (age 72) Shiprock, New Mexico, U.S.
- Party: Democratic

Ray Begaye (born February 15, 1954, in Shiprock, New Mexico) is an American politician. He was a member of the New Mexico House of Representatives from the 4th District, from 1999 to 2013. He is a member of the Democratic Party.
