= Edward Sandoval =

American politician (1947–2021)

Member of the New Mexico House of Representatives from the 17th district
- In office January 1983 – January 2015
- Succeeded by: Deborah Armstrong

Personal details
- Born: January 28, 1947
- Died: March 3, 2021 (aged 74) Albuquerque, New Mexico, U.S.
- Party: Democratic
- Education: University of New Mexico

Edward C. Sandoval (January 28, 1947 – March 3, 2021) was an American politician and a Democratic member of the New Mexico House of Representatives representing District 17 from January 1983 through January 2015. He did not seek reelection in 2014.

== Biography ==
Sandoval attended the University of New Mexico.

He died on March 3, 2021, at age 74, following a long battle with COVID-19 during the COVID-19 pandemic in New Mexico.

== Elections ==
- 2012 Sandoval was unopposed for the June 5, 2012 Democratic Primary, winning with 2,221 votes and won the November 6, 2012 General election with 7,816 votes (66.6%) against Republican nominee Robert Cain.
- 1982 Sandoval was first elected to the New Mexico Legislature in the November 2, 1982 General election and was re-elected in the general elections of November 6, 1984, November 4, 1986, and November 8, 1988.
- 1990 Sandoval was unopposed for both the June 5, 1990 Democratic Primary, winning with 1,814 votes and the November 6, 1990 General election, winning with 3,677 votes.
- 1992 Sandoval was challenged in the June 2, 1992 Democratic Primary, winning with 1,483 votes (56.1%) and won the November 3, 1992 General election with 4,650 votes (66.7%) against Republican nominee Bernardo Gallegos.
- 1994 Sandoval was unopposed for both the June 7, 1994 Democratic Primary, winning with 2,138 votes and the November 8, 1994 General election, winning with 4,288 votes.
- 1996 Sandoval was unopposed for both the June 4, 1996 Democratic Primary, winning with 1,853 votes and the November 5, 1996 General election.
- 1998 Sandoval was unopposed for both the June 2, 1998 Democratic Primary, winning with 1,610 votes and the November 3, 1998 General election, winning with 4,404 votes.
- 2000 Sandoval was unopposed for the 2000 Democratic Primary, winning with 1,570 votes and won the November 7, 2000 General election with 4,721 votes (69.1%) against Republican nominee Glenn Garcia.
- 2002 Sandoval was unopposed for both the 2002 Democratic Primary, winning with 2,498 votes and the November 5, 2002 General election, winning with 6,237 votes.
- 2004 Sandoval was unopposed for both the June 1, 2004 Democratic Primary, winning with 1,959 votes and the November 2, 2004 General election, winning with 9,714 votes.
- 2006 Sandoval was unopposed for both the June 6, 2006 Democratic Primary, winning with 1,986 votes and the November 7, 2006 General election, winning with 7,965 votes.
- 2008 Sandoval was unopposed for the June 8, 2008 Democratic Primary, winning with 2,923 votes and won the November 4, 2008 General election with 9,637 votes (66.6%) against Republican nominee Ronald Toya.
- 2010 Sandoval was unopposed for both the June 1, 2010 Democratic Primary, winning with 2,251 votes and the November 2, 2010 General election, winning with 7,459 votes.
