= Thomas Anderson (New Mexico politician) =

American politician (1933–2024)

Member of the New Mexico House of Representatives from the 29th district
- In office January 2003 – January 2015
- Preceded by: William Fuller
- Succeeded by: David Adkins

Personal details
- Born: May 8, 1933
- Died: October 25, 2024 (aged 91) Albuquerque, New Mexico, U.S.
- Party: Republican

Military service
- Branch/service: United States Navy

Thomas Anthony Anderson (May 8, 1933 – October 25, 2024) was an American politician and a Republican former member of the New Mexico House of Representatives representing District 29 from January 2003 through January 2015.

== Biography ==
Anderson was born on May 8, 1933. He died in Albuquerque, New Mexico on October 25, 2024, at the age of 91.

== Elections ==
Elections for the office of New Mexico House of Representatives took place in 2014. A primary election took place on June 3, 2014, and a general election took place on November 4, 2014. The signature-filing deadline for candidates wishing to run in this election was February 4, 2014. Incumbent Thomas Anderson was defeated by David Edward Adkins in the Republican primary, while Ronnie Martinez was unopposed in the Democratic primary.

- 2012 Anderson was challenged in the June 5, 2012 Republican Primary, winning with 679 votes (57.5%) and won the November 6, 2012 General election with 6,026 votes (52.5%) against Democratic nominee Lloyd Ginsberg.
- 2002 When District 29 incumbent Republican Representative William Fuller left the Legislature and left the seat open, Anderson ran in the 2002 Republican Primary, winning with 892 votes (51.3%) and won the November 5, 2002 General election with 4,697 votes (60.1%) against Democratic nominee Joann Anders.
- 2004 Anderson and returning 2002 Democratic opponent Joann Anders were both unopposed for their June 1, 2004 primaries, setting up a rematch; Anderson won the November 2, 2004 General election with 9,027 votes (55.4%) against Anders.
- 2006 Anderson was challenged in the June 6, 2006 Republican Primary and won with 620 votes (64%), in the November 7, 2006 General election, Anderson won with 6,929 votes (52.8%) against Democratic nominee Antonio Sandoval.
- 2008 Anderson was unopposed for both the June 8, 2008 Republican Primary, winning with 2,598 votes and the November 4, 2008 General election with 14,871 votes.
- 2010 Anderson was unopposed for the June 1, 2010 Republican Primary, winning with 2,844 votes and won the November 2, 2010 General election with 9,274 votes (59.1%) against Democratic nominee Alexander Russell.
