= Gail Chasey =

American politician (born 1944)

Majority Leader of the New Mexico House of Representatives
- In office January 17, 2023 – December 31, 2024
- Preceded by: Javier Martínez
- Succeeded by: Reena Szczepanski

Member of the New Mexico House of Representatives from the 18th district
- In office January 1997 – December 31, 2024
- Preceded by: Cisco McSorley
- Succeeded by: Marianna Anaya

Personal details
- Born: April 1, 1944 (age 82) Arizona, U.S.
- Party: Democratic
- Spouse: David L. Norvell
- Education: University of New Mexico (BA, MA, PhD, JD)
- Website: Official website

Gail Chasey (née Beam; born April 1, 1944) is an American politician and a former member of the New Mexico House of Representatives representing District 18 from 1997 until 2024. She is married to former Attorney General of New Mexico and Speaker of the New Mexico House of Representatives David L. Norvell.

== Education ==
Chasey earned her PhD in special education from University of New Mexico and her JD from the University of New Mexico School of Law.

== Political career ==
In 2019, Chasey introduced legislation that would prohibit disenfranchisement of felons. If the bill is successful, New Mexico would become the third state (in addition to Maine and Vermont) to allow felons to vote while serving sentences.

Chasey became Majority Leader of the New Mexico House of Representatives in 2023. She did not run for re-election in 2024, and she was replaced by fellow Democrat Marianna Anaya.

== Electoral history ==
New Mexico House of Representatives, District 18 Democratic primary, 1996
Party	Candidate	Votes	%
Democratic	Gail Beam	964	53.5
Democratic	Peter Lundman	355	19.7
Democratic	Daniel Ivey-Soto	329	18.3
Democratic	Bill Hoch	154	8.5

New Mexico House of Representatives, District 18 general election, 1996
Party	Candidate	Votes	%
Democratic	Gail Beam	4,328	56.6
Green	Robert Anderson	2,150	28.1
Independent	Jeffrey Gittelman	1,166	15.2

New Mexico House of Representatives, District 18 general election, 1998
Party	Candidate	Votes	%
Democratic	Gail Beam	5,064	100

New Mexico House of Representatives, District 18 general election, 2000
Party	Candidate	Votes	%
Democratic	Gail Beam	8,664	100

New Mexico House of Representatives, District 18 general election, 2002
Party	Candidate	Votes	%
Democratic	Gail Beam	5,946	100

New Mexico House of Representatives, District 18 general election, 2004
Party	Candidate	Votes	%
Democratic	Gail Beam	10,255	100

New Mexico House of Representatives, District 18 Democratic primary, 2006
Party	Candidate	Votes	%
Democratic	Gail Chasey	1,434	78.1
Democratic	Joseph Garcia	402	21.9

New Mexico House of Representatives, District 18 general election, 2006
Party	Candidate	Votes	%
Democratic	Gail Chasey	7,049	82.8
Republican	Lance Klafeta	1,468	17.2

New Mexico House of Representatives, District 18 general election, 2008
Party	Candidate	Votes	%
Democratic	Gail Chasey	10,237	100

New Mexico House of Representatives, District 18 general election, 2010
Party	Candidate	Votes	%
Democratic	Gail Chasey	6,564	100

New Mexico House of Representatives, District 18 general election, 2012
Party	Candidate	Votes	%
Democratic	Gail Chasey	10,034	81.1
Republican	Tyson Cosper	2,339	18.9

New Mexico House of Representatives, District 18 general election, 2014
Party	Candidate	Votes	%
Democratic	Gail Chasey	6,423	100

New Mexico House of Representatives, District 18 general election, 2016
Party	Candidate	Votes	%
Democratic	Gail Chasey	9,922	100

New Mexico House of Representatives, District 18 general election, 2018
Party	Candidate	Votes	%
Democratic	Gail Chasey	9,677	100

New Mexico House of Representatives, District 18 general election, 2020
Party	Candidate	Votes	%
Democratic	Gail Chasey	10,709	100

New Mexico House of Representatives, District 18 general election, 2022
Party	Candidate	Votes	%
Democratic	Gail Chasey	10,292	84.6
Republican	Scott Cannon	1,872	15.4

New Mexico House of Representatives
Preceded by Javier Martínez	Majority Leader of the New Mexico House of Representatives; 2023–2024	Succeeded by Reena Szczepanski
