= Jeannette Wallace =

American politician (1934–2011)

Jeannette O. Wallace

Member of the New Mexico House of Representatives for the 43rd district
- In office 1991–2011

Personal details
- Born: January 16, 1934 Scottsdale, Arizona, United States
- Died: April 8, 2011 (aged 77) Los Alamos, New Mexico, United States
- Party: Republican
- Profession: public relations

Jeannette O. Wallace (January 16, 1934 – April 8, 2011) was an American politician who was a Republican member of the New Mexico House of Representatives from 1991 until her death. She was an alumnus of Arizona State University and worked in public relations.

She was married to Terry Wallace Sr., a staff member at Los Alamos National Laboratory. Their son Terry Wallace Jr., a geophysicist, became the 11th director of Los Alamos National Laboratory in 2018.
