= Ben Luján =

American politician (1935–2012)

21st Speaker of the New Mexico House of Representatives
- In office 2001–2012
- Preceded by: Raymond G. Sanchez
- Succeeded by: W. Ken Martinez

Member of the New Mexico House of Representatives from the 46th district
- In office 1975–2012
- Succeeded by: Carl Trujillo

Personal details
- Born: July 12, 1935 Nambé Pueblo, New Mexico, U.S.
- Died: December 18, 2012 (aged 77) Santa Fe, New Mexico, U.S.
- Party: Democratic
- Spouse: Carmen Ray
- Relatives: 4 (including Ben)

Ben Luján, Sr. (July 12, 1935 – December 18, 2012) was an American politician from New Mexico. A Democrat, he was the Speaker of the New Mexico House of Representatives. He served in the State House from 1975 through 2012. He was elected as Speaker beginning in 2001, serving until his death in office. His legislative district, the 46th, was composed mostly of Santa Fe. He is the father of U.S. Senator Ben Ray Luján.

== Early life ==
Ben Luján was born to Nestora and Celedon Luján on July 12, 1935 in the Nambé Pueblo. His brothers were Ramos, Gustavo and Nestor; and sisters, Olivama and Josie. Their father was a sheepherder and was one of the first laborers recruited for the Manhattan Project at Los Alamos. Lujan's family were Hispanos of New Mexico, descendants of colonial settlers in the area long before it was part of the United States.

== Career ==
Although he had hoped to be the first in his family to go to college, Luján became an iron worker and contractor for the Los Alamos National Laboratory to support his family.

In 1970, the senior Luján entered politics, being elected to the Santa Fe County Commission. In 1974 he was elected to the New Mexico State House. He served succeeding terms for decades, and in all three leadership positions: as Majority Whip, Majority Floor Leader, and as the second longest-serving Speaker of the House until his death in 2012.

== Personal life ==
Luján was married to Carmen Ray, and the couple had four children, including Ben Ray Luján. Luján died of cancer in 2012, aged 77.
