= Nathan P. Cote =

American politician

Nate Cote

Member of the New Mexico House of Representatives from the 53rd district
- In office 2007 - 2011, 2013 - 2015
- Preceded by: Rick Little
- Succeeded by: Rick Little

Personal details
- Born: December 4, 1946 (age 79)
- Party: Democratic
- Occupation: college administrator

Nathan P. "Nate" Cote (/ˈkoʊtiː/; born December 4, 1946) is a former member of the New Mexico House of Representatives who represented the 53rd District from 2007 to 2011, and again from 2013 to 2015.
