= Shirley Tyler =

American politician

Member of the New Mexico House of Representatives from the 61st district
- In office 2007–2013
- Succeeded by: David Gallegos

Personal details
- Party: Republican

Shirley Tyler is an American politician who served as a member of the New Mexico House of Representatives for the 61st district from 2007 to 2013. Elected in 2006, she resigned in 2012 and was succeeded by David Gallegos. During her tenure, Tyler was a member of the National Conference of State Legislatures Nuclear Legislative Workgroup.

In March 2011, Tyler married J.B. Pugh in the chamber of the New Mexico House of Representatives. She was walked down the aisle by Donald Bratton.
