= Ernest Chavez (politician) =

American politician (born 1937)

Member of the New Mexico House of Representatives from the 12th district
- In office 2005–2015
- Preceded by: James Taylor
- Succeeded by: Patricio Ruiloba

Personal details
- Born: February 6, 1937 (age 89) Albuquerque, New Mexico, U.S.
- Party: Democratic
- Education: Albuquerque Business College

Ernest Chavez (born February 6, 1937, in Albuquerque, New Mexico) is an American politician and a Democratic former member of the New Mexico House of Representatives representing District 12. He was first elected in 2004 and entered office in 2005. He did not seek reelection in 2014.

== Education ==
Chavez graduated Albuquerque High School and Albuquerque Business College.

== Elections ==
- 2012: Chavez and returning 2008 and 2010 Republican challenger Clyde Wheeler were both unopposed for their June 5, 2012, primaries setting up a direct rematch; Chavez won the November 6, 2012, General election with 4,736 votes (71.8%) against Wheeler.
- 1992: To challenge District 12 incumbent Democratic Representative Delano Garcia, Chavez ran in the June 2, 1992, Democratic Primary but lost to Representative Garcia who was unopposed for the November 3, 1992, General election, and was re-elected.
- 1994: Again challenging Representative Garcia, Chavez ran in the three-way June 7, 1994, Democratic Primary but Chavez and Representative Garcia lost to James Taylor who was unopposed for the November 8, 1994, General election, and was elected, winning re-election in 1996, 1998, 2000, and 2002.
- 2004: District 12 incumbent Democratic Representative Taylor was challenged in the June 1, 2004, Democratic Primary but won; when Taylor was appointed to the New Mexico Senate, Chavez replaced him on the November 2, 2004, General election ballot, and was unopposed, winning with 5,730 votes.
- 2006: Chavez was unopposed for both the June 6, 2006, Democratic Primary, winning with 1,008 votes and the November 7, 2006, General election, winning with 4,608 votes.
- 2008: Chavez was unopposed for both the June 8, 2008, Democratic Primary, winning with 1,852 votes and won the three-way November 4, 2008, General election with 6,265 votes (65.5%) against Republican nominee Clyde Wheeler and Independent Robert Schiller.
- 2010: Chavez, Clyde Wheeler, and Robert Schiller were all unopposed for their June 1, 2010, primaries, setting up a rematch; Chavez won the three-way November 2, 2010, General election with 3,945 votes (58.3) against Wheeler and Schiller.
