= Mary Helen Garcia =

American politician (born 1937)

Member of the New Mexico House of Representatives from the 34th district
- In office January 1997 – January 2015
- Preceded by: Samuel Reyes
- Succeeded by: Bealquin "Bill" Gomez

Personal details
- Born: July 14, 1937 (age 89) Las Cruces, New Mexico, U.S.
- Party: Democratic
- Education: New Mexico State University

Mary Helen A. Garcia (born July 14, 1937 in Las Cruces, New Mexico) is an American politician and a Democratic former member of the New Mexico House of Representatives representing District 34 from January 1997 through 2015. She lost the 2014 Democratic primary to challenger Bealquin "Bill" Gomez.

== Education ==
Garcia earned her BA and her MA from New Mexico State University.

== Elections ==
- 2012 Garcia was unopposed for both the June 5, 2012 Democratic Primary, winning with 616 votes and the November 6, 2012 General election, winning with 4,891 votes.
- 1996 When District 34 Republican Representative Samuel Reyes left the Legislature and left the seat open, Garcia was unopposed for the June 4, 1996 Democratic Primary, winning with 739 votes and won the November 5, 1996 General election against Republican nominee Esperanza Holguin.
- 1998 Garcia was unopposed for the June 2, 1998 Democratic Primary, winning with 1,010 votes and won the November 3, 1998 General election, winning with 2,012 votes (61.1%) against Republican nominee Johnny Holguin.
- 2000 Garcia was challenged in the 2000 Democratic Primary, winning with 681 votes (58.5%) and was unopposed for the November 7, 2000 General election, winning with 3,831 votes.
- 2002 Garcia was unopposed for the 2002 Democratic Primary, winning with 723 votes and won the November 5, 2002 General election with 1,881 votes (64.3%) against Republican nominee Daniel Rollings.
- 2004 Garcia was unopposed for both the June 1, 2004 Democratic Primary, winning with 500 votes and the November 2, 2004 General election, winning with 4,080 votes.
- 2006 Garcia was unopposed for both the June 6, 2006 Democratic Primary, winning with 230 votes and the November 7, 2006 General election, winning with 2,511 votes.
- 2008 Garcia was unopposed for both the June 8, 2008 Democratic Primary, winning with 629 votes and the November 4, 2008 General election, winning with 5,111 votes.
- 2010 Garcia was unopposed for both the June 1, 2010 Democratic Primary, winning with 333 votes and the November 2, 2010 General election, winning with 2,860 votes.
