= 2014 New Mexico House of Representatives election =

- November 4, 2014

All 70 seats in the New Mexico House of Representatives 36 seats needed for a majority
	Majority party	Minority party
Leader	Donald Bratton (retired)	Ken Martinez
Party	Republican	Democratic
Leader's seat	62nd - Hobbs	69th - Grants
Last election	32	38
Seats before	33	37
Seats won	37	33
Seat change	▲4	▼4
Popular vote	215,079	226,538
Percentage	47.97%	50.53%
- Results: Democratic hold Democratic gain Republican hold Republican gain
Speaker of the House before election
Ken Martinez
Democratic
Elected Speaker of the House
Don Tripp
Republican

The 2014 New Mexico House of Representatives election took place as part of the biennial United States elections. New Mexico voters elected state representatives in all 70 of the state house's districts. State representatives serve two-year terms in the New Mexico House of Representatives. The election coincided with elections for other offices, including for U.S. Senate, U.S. House, Governor, and Attorney General. A primary election held on June 3, 2014, determined which candidates appear on the November 8th general election ballot.

== Results summary ==
District	Incumbent	Party	Elected representative	Party
1st	Tom Taylor	Rep	Rod Montoya	Rep
2nd	James Strickler	Rep	James Strickler	Rep
3rd	Paul Bandy	Rep	Paul Bandy	Rep
4th	Sharon Clahchischilliage	Rep	Sharon Clahchischilliage	Rep
5th	Sandra Jeff	Dem	Doreen Wonda Johnson	Dem
6th	Eliseo Alcon	Dem	Eliseo Alcon	Dem
7th	Kelly Fajardo	Rep	Kelly Fajardo	Rep
8th	Alonzo Baldonado	Rep	Alonzo Baldonado	Rep
9th	Patricia Lundstrom	Dem	Patricia Lundstrom	Dem
10th	Henry Saavedra	Dem	Andrés Romero	Dem
11th	Rick Miera	Dem	Javier Martínez	Dem
12th	Ernest Chavez	Dem	Patricio Ruiloba	Dem
13th	Patricia Roybal Caballero	Dem	Patricia Roybal Caballero	Dem
14th	Miguel Garcia	Dem	Miguel Garcia	Dem
15th	Emily Kane	Dem	Sarah Maestas Barnes	Rep
16th	Moe Maestas	Dem	Moe Maestas	Dem
17th	Edward Sandoval	Dem	Deborah Armstrong	Dem
18th	Gail Chasey	Dem	Gail Chasey	Dem
19th	Sheryl Williams Stapleton	Dem	Sheryl Williams Stapleton	Dem
20th	James White	Rep	Jim Dines	Rep
21st	Mimi Stewart	Dem	Mimi Stewart	Dem
22nd	James Smith	Rep	James Smith	Rep
23rd	Paul Pacheco	Rep	Paul Pacheco	Rep
24th	Liz Thomson	Dem	Conrad James	Rep
25th	Christine Trujillo	Dem	Christine Trujillo	Dem
26th	Georgene Louis	Dem	Georgene Louis	Dem
27th	Larry Larrañaga	Rep	Larry Larrañaga	Rep
28th	Jimmie Hall	Rep	Jimmie Hall	Rep
29th	Thomas Anderson	Rep	David Adkins	Rep
30th	Nate Gentry	Rep	Nate Gentry	Rep
31st	Bill Rehm	Rep	Bill Rehm	Rep
32nd	Dona Irwin	Dem	Dona Irwin	Dem
33rd	Bill McCamley	Dem	Bill McCamley	Dem
34th	Mary Helen Garcia	Dem	Bealquin "Bill" Gomez	Dem
35th	Jeff Steinborn	Dem	Jeff Steinborn	Dem
36th	Phillip Archuleta	Dem	Andy Nuñez	Rep
37th	Terry McMillan	Rep	Terry McMillan	Rep
38th	Dianne Hamilton	Rep	Dianne Hamilton	Rep
39th	Rodolpho Martinez	Dem	John L. Zimmerman	Rep
40th	Nick Salazar	Dem	Nick Salazar	Dem
41st	Debbie Rodella	Dem	Debbie Rodella	Dem
42nd	Roberto Gonzales	Dem	Roberto Gonzales	Dem
43rd	Stephanie Garcia Richard	Dem	Stephanie Garcia Richard	Dem
44th	Jane Powdrell-Culbert	Rep	Jane Powdrell-Culbert	Rep
45th	Jim Trujillo	Dem	Jim Trujillo	Dem
46th	Carl Trujillo	Dem	Carl Trujillo	Dem
47th	Brian Egolf	Dem	Brian Egolf	Dem
48th	Lucky Varela	Dem	Lucky Varela	Dem
49th	Don Tripp	Rep	Don Tripp	Rep
50th	Vickie Perea	Rep	Matthew McQueen	Dem
51st	Yvette Herrell	Rep	Yvette Herrell	Rep
52nd	Doreen Gallegos	Dem	Doreen Gallegos	Dem
53rd	Nate Cote	Dem	Ricky Little	Rep
54th	Bill Gray	Rep	Jim Townsend	Rep
55th	Cathrynn Brown	Rep	Cathrynn Brown	Rep
56th	Zachary Cook	Rep	Zachary Cook	Rep
57th	Jason Harper	Rep	Jason Harper	Rep
58th	Candy Ezzell	Rep	Candy Ezzell	Rep
59th	Nora Espinoza	Rep	Nora Espinoza	Rep
60th	Tim Lewis	Rep	Tim Lewis	Rep
61st	David Gallegos	Rep	David Gallegos	Rep
62nd	Donald Bratton	Rep	Larry Scott	Rep
63rd	George Dodge Jr.	Dem	George Dodge Jr.	Dem
64th	Anna Crook	Rep	Randal Crowder	Rep
65th	James Madalena	Dem	James Madalena	Dem
66th	Bob Wooley	Rep	Bob Wooley	Rep
67th	Dennis Roch	Rep	Dennis Roch	Rep
68th	Monica Youngblood	Rep	Monica Youngblood	Rep
69th	Ken Martinez	Dem	Ken Martinez	Dem
70th	Tomás Salazar	Dem	Tomás Salazar	Dem

Party	Candi- dates	Votes		Seats		
Party	Candi- dates	No.	%	No.	+/–	%
Republican	47	215,079	47.97	37	▲4	52.86
Democratic	55	226,538	50.53	33	▼4	47.14
Independent/write-in	4	6,699	1.49	0	Steady	0.00
Total	106	448,316	100%	70	Steady	100%

House seats
Republican	52.86%
Democratic	47.14%

Popular vote
Democratic	50.53%
Republican	47.97%
Independent/write-in	1.49%

=== Incumbents defeated in the primary election ===
- Thomas Anderson (R-District 29), defeated by David Adkins (R)
- Mary Helen Garcia (D-District 34), defeated by Bealquin "Bill" Gomez (D)

=== Incumbents defeated in the general election ===
- Sandra Jeff (D-District 5), (Note: Jeff was removed from the ballot and ran a write-in campaign for the general election.) defeated by Doreen Wonda Johnson (D)
- Emily Kane (D-District 15), defeated by Sarah Maestas Barnes (R)
- Liz Thomson (D-District 24), defeated by Conrad James (R)
- Phillip Archuleta (D-District 36), defeated by Andy Nuñez (R)
- Rodolpho Martinez (D-District 39), defeated by John L. Zimmerman (R)
- Vickie Perea (R-District 50), defeated by Matthew McQueen (D)

=== Open seats that changed parties ===
- Nate Cote (D-District 53) didn't seek re-election, seat won by Ricky Little (R)

== Predictions ==
Source	Ranking	As of
Governing	Tossup	October 20, 2014

== Detailed results ==
Source for primary election results:New Mexico Secretary of State Source for general election results:New Mexico Secretary of State

=== District 1 ===
Incumbent Republican Tom Taylor has represented the 1st district and its predecessors since 1999. Taylor didn't seek re-election and fellow Republican Rod Montoya won the open seat. Republican primary

New Mexico House of Representatives 1st district Republican primary election, 2014
Party	Candidate	Votes	%
Republican	Rod Montoya	1,426	51.97%
Republican	Karen Bayless	1,318	48.03%
Total votes		2,744	100%

General election

New Mexico House of Representatives 1st district general election, 2014
Party	Candidate	Votes	%
Republican	Rod Montoya	5,971	72.80%
Democratic	Alfred Glass	2,231	27.20%
Total votes		8,202	100%
Republican hold			

=== District 2 ===
Incumbent Republican James Strickler has represented the 2nd district since 2007.

New Mexico House of Representatives 2nd district general election, 2014
Party	Candidate	Votes	%
Republican	James Strickler (incumbent)	3,867	76.63%
Democratic	Nathan Thompson	1,179	23.37%
Total votes		5,046	100%
Republican hold			

=== District 3 ===
Incumbent Republican Paul Bandy has represented the 3rd district since 2007.

New Mexico House of Representatives 3rd district general election, 2014
Party	Candidate	Votes	%
Republican	Paul Bandy (incumbent)	5,168	100%
Total votes		5,168	100%
Republican hold			

=== District 4 ===
Incumbent Republican Sharon Clahchischilliage has represented the 4th district since 2013.

New Mexico House of Representatives 4th district general election, 2014
Party	Candidate	Votes	%
Republican	Sharon Clahchischilliage (incumbent)	3,785	59.76%
Democratic	Harrison Todacheene	2,549	40.24%
Total votes		6,334	100%
Republican hold			

=== District 5 ===
Incumbent Democrat Sandra Jeff has represented the 5th district since 2009. Jeff ran for re-election but was removed from the ballot. She lost a write-in campaign in the general election to Democratic nominee Doreen Wonda Johnson. Democratic primary

New Mexico House of Representatives 5th district Democratic primary election, 2014
Party	Candidate	Votes	%
Democratic	Doreen Wonda Johnson	1,574	54.52%
Democratic	Charles Long	1,313	45.48%
Total votes		2,887	100%

General election

New Mexico House of Representatives 5th district general election, 2014
Party	Candidate	Votes	%
Democratic	Doreen Wonda Johnson	4,807	86.30%
Democratic	Sandra Jeff (incumbent) (write-in)	763	13.70%
Total votes		5,570	100%
Democratic hold			

=== District 6 ===
Incumbent Democrat Eliseo Alcon has represented the 6th district since 2009.

New Mexico House of Representatives 6th district general election, 2014
Party	Candidate	Votes	%
Democratic	Eliseo Alcon (incumbent)	4,512	98.49%
Democratic	Shelly C. Chimoni (write-in)	69	1.51%
Total votes		4,581	100%
Democratic hold			

=== District 7 ===
Incumbent Republican Kelly Fajardo has represented the 7th district since 2013. Democratic primary

New Mexico House of Representatives 7th district Democratic primary election, 2014
Party	Candidate	Votes	%
Democratic	Teresa K.E. Smith de Cherif	792	51.43%
Democratic	Andrew Barreras	748	48.57%
Total votes		1,540	100%

General election

New Mexico House of Representatives 7th district general election, 2014
Party	Candidate	Votes	%
Republican	Kelly Fajardo (incumbent)	3,514	57.08%
Democratic	Teresa K.E. Smith de Cherif	2,642	42.92%
Total votes		6,156	100%
Republican hold			

=== District 8 ===
Incumbent Republican Alonzo Baldonado has represented the 8th district since 2011. Democratic primary

New Mexico House of Representatives 8th district Democratic primary election, 2014
Party	Candidate	Votes	%
Democratic	Frank Otero	1,102	58.12%
Democratic	Jim Danner	794	41.88%
Total votes		1,896	100%

General election

New Mexico House of Representatives 8th district general election, 2014
Party	Candidate	Votes	%
Republican	Alonzo Baldonado (incumbent)	4,770	58.72%
Democratic	Frank Otero	3,353	41.28%
Total votes		8,123	100%
Republican hold			

=== District 9 ===
Incumbent Democrat Patricia Lundstrom has represented the 9th district since 2003. Democratic primary

New Mexico House of Representatives 9th district Democratic primary election, 2014
Party	Candidate	Votes	%
Democratic	Patricia Lundstrom (incumbent)	1,769	63.61%
Democratic	Olin Clawson	551	19.81%
Democratic	Yolanda Ahasteen-Azua	280	10.07%
Democratic	Jordon Johnson	181	6.51%
Total votes		2,781	100%

General election

New Mexico House of Representatives 9th district general election, 2014
Party	Candidate	Votes	%
Democratic	Patricia Lundstrom (incumbent)	4,437	100%
Total votes		4,437	100%
Democratic hold			

=== District 10 ===
Incumbent Democrat Henry Saavedra has represented the 10th district since 1977. Saavedra didn't seek re-election and fellow Democrat Andrés Romero won the open seat. Democratic primary

New Mexico House of Representatives 10th district Democratic primary election, 2014
Party	Candidate	Votes	%
Democratic	Andrés Romero	619	51.03%
Democratic	Randy Saavedra	324	26.71%
Democratic	Sisto Abeyta	270	22.26%
Total votes		1,213	100%

General election

New Mexico House of Representatives 10th district general election, 2014
Party	Candidate	Votes	%
Democratic	Andrés Romero	2,463	58.06%
Independent	Robert A. Schiller	1,779	41.94%
Total votes		4,242	100%
Democratic hold			

=== District 11 ===
Incumbent Democrat Rick Miera has represented the 11th district since 1991. Miera didn't seek re-election and fellow Democrat Javier Martinez won the open seat. Democratic primary

New Mexico House of Representatives 11th district Democratic primary election, 2014
Party	Candidate	Votes	%
Democratic	Javier Martinez	1,951	78.86%
Democratic	John Gabriel Rivera Jr.	523	21.14%
Total votes		2,474	100%

General election

New Mexico House of Representatives 11th district general election, 2014
Party	Candidate	Votes	%
Democratic	Javier Martinez	6,413	100%
Total votes		6,413	100%
Democratic hold			

=== District 12 ===
Incumbent Democrat Ernest Chavez has represented the 12th district since 2005. Chavez didn't seek re-election and fellow Democrat Patricio Ruiloba won the open seat. Democratic primary

New Mexico House of Representatives 12th district Democratic primary election, 2014
Party	Candidate	Votes	%
Democratic	Patricio Ruiloba (incumbent)	438	42.12%
Democratic	Mark Armijo	405	38.94%
Democratic	Lorenzo Pino	197	18.94%
Total votes		1,040	100%

General election

New Mexico House of Representatives 12th district general election, 2014
Party	Candidate	Votes	%
Democratic	Patricio Ruiloba	2,779	100%
Total votes		2,779	100%
Democratic hold			

=== District 13 ===
Incumbent Democrat Patricia Roybal Caballero has represented the 13th district since 2013.

New Mexico House of Representatives 13th district general election, 2014
Party	Candidate	Votes	%
Democratic	Patricia Roybal Caballero (incumbent)	2,524	100%
Total votes		2,524	100%
Democratic hold			

=== District 14 ===
Incumbent Democrat Miguel Garcia has represented the 14th district since 1997.

New Mexico House of Representatives 14th district general election, 2014
Party	Candidate	Votes	%
Democratic	Miguel Garcia (incumbent)	3,154	69.38%
Republican	Robert Chavez	1,392	30.62%
Total votes		4,546	100%
Democratic hold			

=== District 15 ===
Incumbent Democrat Emily Kane has represented the 15th district since 2013. Kane lost re-election to Republican Sarah Maestas Barnes.

New Mexico House of Representatives 15th district general election, 2014
Party	Candidate	Votes	%
Republican	Sarah Maestas Barnes	4,816	51.92%
Democratic	Emily Kane (incumbent)	4,460	48.08%
Total votes		9,276	100%
Republican gain from Democratic			

=== District 16 ===
Incumbent Democrat Moe Maestas has represented the 16th district since 2007.

New Mexico House of Representatives 16th district general election, 2014
Party	Candidate	Votes	%
Democratic	Moe Maestas (incumbent)	4,112	56.67%
Republican	Johnny F. Luevano	3,144	43.33%
Total votes		7,256	100%
Democratic hold			

=== District 17 ===
Incumbent Democrat Edward Sandoval has represented the 17th district since 1983. retired and fellow Democrat Deborah Armstrong won the open seat.

New Mexico House of Representatives 17th district general election, 2014
Party	Candidate	Votes	%
Democratic	Deborah Armstrong	5,433	100%
Total votes		5,433	100%
Democratic hold			

=== District 18 ===
Incumbent Democrat Gail Chasey has represented the 18th district since 1997.

New Mexico House of Representatives 18th district general election, 2014
Party	Candidate	Votes	%
Democratic	Gail Chasey (incumbent)	6,423	100%
Total votes		6,423	100%
Democratic hold			

=== District 19 ===
Incumbent Democrat Sheryl Williams Stapleton has represented the 19th district since 1995.

New Mexico House of Representatives 19th district general election, 2014
Party	Candidate	Votes	%
Democratic	Sheryl Williams Stapleton (incumbent)	5,496	100%
Total votes		5,496	100%
Democratic hold			

=== District 20 ===
Incumbent Republican James White has represented the 20th district since 2009. White didn't seek re-election and fellow Republican Jim Dines won the open seat.

New Mexico House of Representatives 20th district general election, 2014
Party	Candidate	Votes	%
Republican	Jim Dines	4,688	54.79%
Democratic	Josh Anderson	3,868	45.21%
Total votes		8,556	100%
Republican hold			

=== District 21 ===
Incumbent Democrat Mimi Stewart has represented the 21st district since 2009.

New Mexico House of Representatives 21st district general election, 2014
Party	Candidate	Votes	%
Democratic	Mimi Stewart (incumbent)	2,565	100%
Total votes		2,565	100%
Democratic hold			

=== District 22 ===
Incumbent Republican James Smith has represented the 22nd district since 2011.

New Mexico House of Representatives 22nd district general election, 2014
Party	Candidate	Votes	%
Republican	James Smith (incumbent)	7,277	59.38%
Democratic	John M. Wallace	4,978	40.62%
Total votes		12,255	100%
Republican hold			

=== District 23 ===
Incumbent Republican Paul Pacheco has represented the 23rd district since 2013.

New Mexico House of Representatives 23rd district general election, 2014
Party	Candidate	Votes	%
Republican	Paul Pacheco (incumbent)	5,139	56.51%
Democratic	Catherine Begaye	3,955	43.49%
Total votes		9,094	100%
Republican hold			

=== District 24 ===
Incumbent Democrat Liz Thomson has represented the 24th district since 2013. Thomson lost re-election to Republican Conrad James, who previously represented the district from 2011 to 2013.

New Mexico House of Representatives 24th district general election, 2014
Party	Candidate	Votes	%
Republican	Conrad James	4,433	52.20%
Democratic	Liz Thomson (incumbent)	4,059	47.80%
Total votes		8,492	100%
Republican gain from Democratic			

=== District 25 ===
Incumbent Democrat Christine Trujillo has represented the 25th district since 2013.

New Mexico House of Representatives 25th district general election, 2014
Party	Candidate	Votes	%
Democratic	Christine Trujillo (incumbent)	5,140	60.52%
Republican	Marianne Costello	3,353	39.48%
Total votes		8,493	100%
Democratic hold			

=== District 26 ===
Incumbent Democrat Georgene Louis has represented the 26th district since 2013.

New Mexico House of Representatives 26th district general election, 2014
Party	Candidate	Votes	%
Democratic	Georgene Louis (incumbent)	2,003	55.58%
Republican	Louis Tafoya	1,601	44.42%
Total votes		3,604	100%
Democratic hold			

=== District 27 ===
Incumbent Republican Larry Larrañaga has represented the 27th district since 1995.

New Mexico House of Representatives 27th district general election, 2014
Party	Candidate	Votes	%
Republican	Larry Larrañaga (incumbent)	6,275	60.55%
Independent	William Pratt	4,088	39.45%
Total votes		10,363	100%
Republican hold			

=== District 28 ===
Incumbent Republican Jimmie Hall has represented the 28th district since 2005.

New Mexico House of Representatives 28th district general election, 2014
Party	Candidate	Votes	%
Republican	Jimmie Hall (incumbent)	7,245	100%
Total votes		7,245	100%
Republican hold			

=== District 29 ===
Incumbent Republican Thomas Anderson has represented the 29th district since 2003. Anderson lost re-nomination to fellow Republican David Adkins, who went on to win the general election. Republican primary

New Mexico House of Representatives 29th district Republican primary election, 2014
Party	Candidate	Votes	%
Republican	David Adkins	494	51.24%
Republican	Thomas Anderson (incumbent)	470	48.76%
Total votes		964	100%

General election

New Mexico House of Representatives 29th district general election, 2014
Party	Candidate	Votes	%
Republican	David Adkins	4,027	53.71%
Democratic	Ronnie Martinez	3,470	46.29%
Total votes		7,497	100%
Republican hold			

=== District 30 ===
Incumbent Republican Nate Gentry has represented the 30th district since 2011.

New Mexico House of Representatives 30th district general election, 2014
Party	Candidate	Votes	%
Republican	Nate Gentry (incumbent)	4,760	54.34%
Democratic	Bob Coffey	3,999	45.66%
Total votes		8,759	100%
Republican hold			

=== District 31 ===
Incumbent Republican Bill Rehm has represented the 31st district since 2007.

New Mexico House of Representatives 31st district general election, 2014
Party	Candidate	Votes	%
Republican	Bill Rehm (incumbent)	9,043	100%
Total votes		9,043	100%
Republican hold			

=== District 32 ===
Incumbent Democrat Dona Irwin has represented the 32nd district since 1999.

New Mexico House of Representatives 32nd district general election, 2014
Party	Candidate	Votes	%
Democratic	Dona Irwin (incumbent)	3,249	53.06%
Republican	Tom Bill Black	2,874	46.94%
Total votes		6,123	100%
Democratic hold			

=== District 33 ===
Incumbent Democrat Bill McCamley has represented the 33rd district since 2013.

New Mexico House of Representatives 33rd district general election, 2014
Party	Candidate	Votes	%
Democratic	Bill McCamley (incumbent)	3,585	57.53%
Republican	Neal L. Hooks	2,646	42.47%
Total votes		6,231	100%
Democratic hold			

=== District 34 ===
Incumbent Democrat Mary Helen Garcia has represented the 34th district since 1997. Garcia lost re-nomination to fellow Democrat Bealquin "Bill" Gomez, who went on to win the general election. Democratic primary

New Mexico House of Representatives 34th district Democratic primary election, 2014
Party	Candidate	Votes	%
Democratic	Bealquin "Bill" Gomez	410	47.84%
Democratic	Mary Helen Garcia (incumbent)	394	45.97%
Democratic	Christian Lira	53	6.18%
Total votes		857	100%

General election

New Mexico House of Representatives 34th district general election, 2014
Party	Candidate	Votes	%
Democratic	Bealquin "Bill" Gomez	2,482	100%
Total votes		2,482	100%
Democratic hold			

=== District 35 ===
Incumbent Democrat Jeff Steinborn has represented the 35th district since 2013.

New Mexico House of Representatives 35th district general election, 2014
Party	Candidate	Votes	%
Democratic	Jeff Steinborn (incumbent)	3,540	57.12%
Republican	Betty Bishop	2,657	42.88%
Total votes		6,197	100%
Democratic hold			

=== District 36 ===
Incumbent Democrat Phillip Archuleta has represented the 36th district since 2013. He lost re-election to Republican Andy Nuñez, who previously represented the district from 2001 to 2013.

New Mexico House of Representatives 36th district general election, 2014
Party	Candidate	Votes	%
Republican	Andy Nuñez	3,113	54.05%
Democratic	Phillip Archuleta (incumbent)	2,646	45.95%
Total votes		5,759	100%
Republican gain from Democratic			

=== District 37 ===
Incumbent Republican Terry McMillan has represented the 37th district since 2011.

New Mexico House of Representatives 37th district general election, 2014
Party	Candidate	Votes	%
Republican	Terry McMillan (incumbent)	4,692	52.28%
Democratic	Joanne Ferrary	4,283	47.72%
Total votes		8,975	100%
Republican hold			

=== District 38 ===
Incumbent Republican Dianne Hamilton has represented the 38th district since 1999.

New Mexico House of Representatives 38th district general election, 2014
Party	Candidate	Votes	%
Republican	Dianne Hamilton (incumbent)	5,593	57.78%
Democratic	Terry Fortenberry	4,087	42.22%
Total votes		9,680	100%
Republican hold			

=== District 39 ===
Incumbent Democrat Rodolpho Martinez has represented the 39th district since 2007. He lost re-election to Republican John L. Zimmerman.

New Mexico House of Representatives 39th district general election, 2014
Party	Candidate	Votes	%
Republican	John L. Zimmerman	3,611	52.50%
Democratic	Rodolpho Martinez (incumbent)	3,267	47.50%
Total votes		6,878	100%
Republican gain from Democratic			

=== District 40 ===
Incumbent Democrat Nick Salazar has represented the 40th district since 1974. Democratic primary

New Mexico House of Representatives 40th district Democratic primary election, 2014
Party	Candidate	Votes	%
Democratic	Nick Salazar (incumbent)	3,811	66.27%
Democratic	Bengie Regensberg	1,940	33.73%
Total votes		5,751	100%

General election

New Mexico House of Representatives 40th district general election, 2014
Party	Candidate	Votes	%
Democratic	Nick Salazar (incumbent)	5,883	66.77%
Republican	James Gallegos	2,928	33.23%
Total votes		8,811	100%
Democratic hold			

=== District 41 ===
Incumbent Democrat Debbie Rodella has represented the 41st district since 1993.

New Mexico House of Representatives 41st district general election, 2014
Party	Candidate	Votes	%
Democratic	Debbie Rodella (incumbent)	4,951	100%
Total votes		4,951	100%
Democratic hold			

=== District 42 ===
Incumbent Democrat Roberto Gonzales has represented the 42nd district since 1995.

New Mexico House of Representatives 42nd district general election, 2014
Party	Candidate	Votes	%
Democratic	Roberto Gonzales (incumbent)	7,738	100%
Total votes		7,738	100%
Democratic hold			

=== District 43 ===
Incumbent Democrat Stephanie Garcia Richard has represented the 43rd district since 2013. Republican primary

New Mexico House of Representatives 43rd district Republican primary election, 2014
Party	Candidate	Votes	%
Republican	Geoff Rodgers	842	53.32%
Republican	Vincent Chiravalle	737	46.68%
Total votes		1,579	100%

General election

New Mexico House of Representatives 43rd district general election, 2014
Party	Candidate	Votes	%
Democratic	Stephanie Garcia Richard (incumbent)	5,955	56.84%
Republican	Geoff Rodgers	4,522	43.16%
Total votes		10,477	100%
Democratic hold			

=== District 44 ===
Incumbent Republican Jane Powdrell-Culbert has represented the 44th district since 2003.

New Mexico House of Representatives 44th district general election, 2014
Party	Candidate	Votes	%
Republican	Jane Powdrell-Culbert (incumbent)	7,594	100%
Total votes		7,594	100%
Republican hold			

=== District 45 ===
Incumbent Democrat Jim Trujillo has represented the 45th district since 2003.

New Mexico House of Representatives 45th district general election, 2014
Party	Candidate	Votes	%
Democratic	Jim Trujillo (incumbent)	6,264	100%
Total votes		6,264	100%
Democratic hold			

=== District 46 ===
Incumbent Democrat Carl Trujillo has represented the 46th district since 2013.

New Mexico House of Representatives 46th district general election, 2014
Party	Candidate	Votes	%
Democratic	Carl Trujillo (incumbent)	8,015	100%
Total votes		8,015	100%
Democratic hold			

=== District 47 ===
Incumbent Democrat Brian Egolf has represented the 47th district since 2009.

New Mexico House of Representatives 47th district general election, 2014
Party	Candidate	Votes	%
Democratic	Brian Egolf (incumbent)	9,770	100%
Total votes		9,770	100%
Democratic hold			

=== District 48 ===
Incumbent Democrat Lucky Varela has represented the 48th district since 1987.

New Mexico House of Representatives 48th district general election, 2014
Party	Candidate	Votes	%
Democratic	Lucky Varela (incumbent)	7,020	100%
Total votes		7,020	100%
Democratic hold			

=== District 49 ===
Incumbent Republican Don Tripp has represented the 49th district since 1999. Democratic primary

New Mexico House of Representatives 49th district Democratic primary election, 2014
Party	Candidate	Votes	%
Democratic	Erik Gale Hawkes	1,421	65.21%
Democratic	Dell Washington	758	34.79%
Total votes		2,179	100%

General election

New Mexico House of Representatives 49th district general election, 2014
Party	Candidate	Votes	%
Republican	Don Tripp (incumbent)	6,053	71.38%
Democratic	Erik Gale Hawkes	2,427	28.62%
Total votes		8,480	100%
Republican hold			

=== District 50 ===
Incumbent Republican Vickie Perea has represented the 50th district since her appointment on November 1, 2013, following the death of Democrat Stephen Easley. Perea lost re-election to Democrat Matthew McQueen.

New Mexico House of Representatives 50th district general election, 2014
Party	Candidate	Votes	%
Democratic	Matthew McQueen	5,546	53.99%
Republican	Vickie Perea (incumbent)	4,727	46.01%
Total votes		10,273	100%
Democratic gain from Republican			

=== District 51 ===
Incumbent Republican Yvette Herrell has represented the 51st district since 2011.

New Mexico House of Representatives 51st district general election, 2014
Party	Candidate	Votes	%
Republican	Yvette Herrell (incumbent)	5,209	100%
Total votes		5,209	100%
Republican hold			

=== District 52 ===
Incumbent Democrat Doreen Gallegos has represented the 52nd district since 2013.

New Mexico House of Representatives 52nd district general election, 2014
Party	Candidate	Votes	%
Democratic	Doreen Gallegos (incumbent)	3,179	100%
Total votes		3,179	100%
Democratic hold			

=== District 53 ===
Incumbent Democrat Nate Cote has represented the 53rd district since 2013. Cote didn't seek re-election and former Republican representative Ricky Little won the open seat.

New Mexico House of Representatives 53rd district general election, 2014
Party	Candidate	Votes	%
Republican	Ricky Little	1,708	61.93%
Democratic	Mariaelena Johnson	1,050	38.07%
Total votes		2,758	100%
Republican gain from Democratic			

=== District 54 ===
Incumbent Republican Bill Gray has represented the 54th district since 2007. Gray retired and fellow Republican Jim Townsend won the open seat. Republican primary

New Mexico House of Representatives 54th district Republican primary election, 2014
Party	Candidate	Votes	%
Republican	Jim Townsend	907	70.58%
Republican	Pam Richardson	378	29.42%
Total votes		1,285	100%

General election

New Mexico House of Representatives 54th district general election, 2014
Party	Candidate	Votes	%
Republican	Jim Townsend	5,045	100%
Total votes		5,045	100%
Republican hold			

=== District 55 ===
Incumbent Republican Cathrynn Brown has represented the 55th district since 2011.

New Mexico House of Representatives 55th district general election, 2014
Party	Candidate	Votes	%
Republican	Cathrynn Brown (incumbent)	5,353	76.03%
Democratic	Christy Thomas	1,688	23.97%
Total votes		7,041	100%
Republican hold			

=== District 56 ===
Incumbent Republican Zachary Cook has represented the 56th district since 2009. Republican primary

New Mexico House of Representatives 56th district Republican primary election, 2014
Party	Candidate	Votes	%
Republican	Zachary Cook (incumbent)	1,377	64.05%
Republican	Jim Lowrance	773	35.95%
Total votes		2,150	100%

General election

New Mexico House of Representatives 56th district general election, 2014
Party	Candidate	Votes	%
Republican	Zachary Cook (incumbent)	5,202	100%
Total votes		5,202	100%
Republican hold			

=== District 57 ===
Incumbent Republican Jason Harper has represented the 57th district since 2013.

New Mexico House of Representatives 57th district general election, 2014
Party	Candidate	Votes	%
Republican	Jason Harper (incumbent)	3,517	59.53%
Democratic	Donna I. Tillman	2,391	40.47%
Total votes		5,908	100%
Republican hold			

=== District 58 ===
Incumbent Republican Candy Ezzell has represented the 58th district since 2005.

New Mexico House of Representatives 58th district general election, 2014
Party	Candidate	Votes	%
Republican	Candy Ezzell (incumbent)	2,972	100%
Total votes		2,972	100%
Republican hold			

=== District 59 ===
Incumbent Republican Nora Espinoza has represented the 59th district since 2007.

New Mexico House of Representatives 59th district general election, 2014
Party	Candidate	Votes	%
Republican	Nora Espinoza (incumbent)	6,481	75.59%
Democratic	Richard Mastin	2,093	24.41%
Total votes		8,574	100%
Republican hold			

=== District 60 ===
Incumbent Republican Tim Lewis has represented the 60th district since 2011.

New Mexico House of Representatives 60th district general election, 2014
Party	Candidate	Votes	%
Republican	Tim Lewis (incumbent)	4,885	63.38%
Democratic	Linda Sanchez Allison	2,822	36.62%
Total votes		7,707	100%
Republican hold			

=== District 61 ===
Incumbent Republican David Gallegos has represented the 61st district since 2013.

New Mexico House of Representatives 61st district general election, 2014
Party	Candidate	Votes	%
Republican	David Gallegos (incumbent)	2,425	100%
Total votes		2,425	100%
Republican hold			

=== District 62 ===
Incumbent Republican Minority Leader Donald Bratton has represented the 62nd district since 2001. Bratton didn't seek re-election and fellow Republican Larry Scott won the open seat.

New Mexico House of Representatives 62nd district general election, 2014
Party	Candidate	Votes	%
Republican	Larry Scott	4,395	100%
Total votes		4,395	100%
Republican hold			

=== District 63 ===
Incumbent Democrat George Dodge Jr. has represented the 63rd district since 2011.

New Mexico House of Representatives 63rd district general election, 2014
Party	Candidate	Votes	%
Democratic	George Dodge Jr. (incumbent)	3,882	100%
Total votes		3,882	100%
Democratic hold			

=== District 64 ===
Incumbent Republican Anna Crook has represented the 64th district since 1995. Crook didn't seek re-election and fellow Republican Randal Crowder won the open seat. Republican primary

New Mexico House of Representatives 64th district Republican primary election, 2014
Party	Candidate	Votes	%
Republican	Randal Crowder	1,529	87.57%
Republican	Wade Lopez	217	12.43%
Total votes		1,746	100%

General election

New Mexico House of Representatives 64th district general election, 2014
Party	Candidate	Votes	%
Republican	Randal Crowder	4,778	100%
Total votes		4,778	100%
Republican hold			

=== District 65 ===
Incumbent Democrat James Madalena has represented the 65th district since 1985. Democratic primary

New Mexico House of Representatives 65th district Democratic primary election, 2014
Party	Candidate	Votes	%
Democratic	James Madalena (incumbent)	1,296	54.45%
Democratic	Orlando Lucero	1,084	45.55%
Total votes		2,380	100%

General election

New Mexico House of Representatives 65th district general election, 2014
Party	Candidate	Votes	%
Democratic	James Madalena (incumbent)	4,744	100%
Total votes		4,744	100%
Democratic hold			

=== District 66 ===
Incumbent Republican Bob Wooley has represented the 66th district since 2011.

New Mexico House of Representatives 66th district general election, 2014
Party	Candidate	Votes	%
Republican	Bob Wooley (incumbent)	5,492	100%
Total votes		5,492	100%
Republican hold			

=== District 67 ===
Incumbent Republican Dennis Roch has represented the 67th district since 2009.

New Mexico House of Representatives 67th district general election, 2014
Party	Candidate	Votes	%
Republican	Dennis Roch (incumbent)	6,676	100%
Total votes		6,676	100%
Republican hold			

=== District 68 ===
Incumbent Republican Monica Youngblood has represented the 68th district since 2013.

New Mexico House of Representatives 68th district general election, 2014
Party	Candidate	Votes	%
Republican	Monica Youngblood (incumbent)	5,663	100%
Total votes		5,663	100%
Republican hold			

=== District 69 ===
Incumbent Democrat House Speaker Ken Martinez had represented the 69th district since 1999.

New Mexico House of Representatives 69th district general election, 2014
Party	Candidate	Votes	%
Democratic	Ken Martinez (incumbent)	4,701	100%
Total votes		4,701	100%
Democratic hold			

=== District 70 ===
Incumbent Democrat Tomás Salazar has represented the 70th district since 2013. Former representative Richard Vigil unsuccessfully challenged Salazar for the Democratic nomination. Democratic primary

New Mexico House of Representatives 70th district Democratic primary election, 2014
Party	Candidate	Votes	%
Democratic	Tomás Salazar (incumbent)	2,552	52.23%
Democratic	Richard Vigil	2,334	47.77%
Total votes		4,886	100%

General election

New Mexico House of Representatives 70th district general election, 2014
Party	Candidate	Votes	%
Democratic	Tomás Salazar (incumbent)	6,276	100%
Total votes		6,276	100%
Democratic hold			

== See also ==
- 2014 United States elections
- 2014 United States House of Representatives elections in New Mexico
- 2014 New Mexico elections
- Elections in New Mexico
