= 2012 New Mexico House of Representatives election =

- November 6, 2012

All 70 seats in the New Mexico House of Representatives 36 seats needed for a majority
	Majority party	Minority party
Leader	Ben Luján (retired)	Donald Bratton
Party	Democratic	Republican
Leader's seat	46th - Nambé	62nd - Hobbs
Last election	37	33
Seats before	36 (Note: Andy Nuñez left the Democratic Party to become an Independent in 2011.)	33
Seats won	38	32
Seat change	▲2	▼1
Popular vote	337,158	325,276
Percentage	50.41%	48.63%
- Results: Democratic hold Democratic gain Republican hold Republican gain
Speaker of the House before election
Ben Luján
Democratic
Elected Speaker of the House
Ken Martinez
Democratic

The 2012 New Mexico House of Representatives election took place as part of the biennial United States elections. New Mexico voters elected state representatives in all 70 of the state house's districts. State representatives serve two-year terms in the New Mexico House of Representatives. The election coincided with elections for other offices, including for U.S. President, U.S. Senate, U.S. House, and State Senate. A primary election held on June 5, 2012, determined which candidates appear on the November 6th general election ballot.

== Results summary ==
District	Incumbent	Party	Elected representative	Party
1st	Tom Taylor	Rep	Tom Taylor	Rep
2nd	James Strickler	Rep	James Strickler	Rep
3rd	Paul Bandy	Rep	Paul Bandy	Rep
4th	Ray Begaye	Dem	Sharon Clahchischilliage	Rep
5th	Sandra Jeff	Dem	Sandra Jeff	Dem
6th	Eliseo Alcon	Dem	Eliseo Alcon	Dem
7th	David Chavez	Rep	Kelly Fajardo	Rep
8th	Alonzo Baldonado	Rep	Alonzo Baldonado	Rep
9th	Patricia Lundstrom	Dem	Patricia Lundstrom	Dem
10th	Henry Saavedra	Dem	Henry Saavedra	Dem
11th	Rick Miera	Dem	Rick Miera	Dem
12th	Ernest Chavez	Dem	Ernest Chavez	Dem
13th	Eleanor Chavez	Dem	Patricia Roybal Caballero	Dem
14th	Miguel Garcia	Dem	Miguel Garcia	Dem
15th	Bill O'Neill	Dem	Emily Kane	Dem
16th	Moe Maestas	Dem	Moe Maestas	Dem
17th	Edward Sandoval	Dem	Edward Sandoval	Dem
18th	Gail Chasey	Dem	Gail Chasey	Dem
19th	Sheryl Williams Stapleton	Dem	Sheryl Williams Stapleton	Dem
20th	James White	Rep	James White	Rep
21st	Mimi Stewart	Dem	Mimi Stewart	Dem
22nd	James Smith	Rep	James Smith	Rep
23rd	David Doyle	Rep	Paul Pacheco	Rep
24th	Conrad James	Rep	Liz Thomson	Dem
25th	Danice Picraux	Dem	Christine Trujillo	Dem
26th	Al Park	Dem	Georgene Louis	Dem
27th	Larry Larrañaga	Rep	Larry Larrañaga	Rep
28th	Jimmie Hall	Rep	Jimmie Hall	Rep
29th	Thomas Anderson	Rep	Thomas Anderson	Rep
30th	Nate Gentry	Rep	Nate Gentry	Rep
31st	Bill Rehm	Rep	Bill Rehm	Rep
32nd	Dona Irwin	Dem	Dona Irwin	Dem
33rd	Joni Gutierrez	Dem	Bill McCamley	Dem
34th	Mary Helen Garcia	Dem	Mary Helen Garcia	Dem
35th	Antonio Luján	Dem	Jeff Steinborn	Dem
36th	Andy Nuñez	Ind	Phillip Archuleta	Dem
37th	Terry McMillan	Rep	Terry McMillan	Rep
38th	Dianne Hamilton	Rep	Dianne Hamilton	Rep
39th	Rodolpho Martinez	Dem	Rodolpho Martinez	Dem
40th	Nick Salazar	Dem	Nick Salazar	Dem
40th	Thomas Garcia (Note: Redistricted from the 68th district.)	Dem	Nick Salazar	Dem
41st	Debbie Rodella	Dem	Debbie Rodella	Dem
42nd	Roberto Gonzales	Dem	Roberto Gonzales	Dem
43rd	James Hall	Rep	Stephanie Garcia Richard	Dem
44th	Jane Powdrell-Culbert	Rep	Jane Powdrell-Culbert	Rep
45th	Jim Trujillo	Dem	Jim Trujillo	Dem
46th	Ben Luján	Dem	Carl Trujillo	Dem
47th	Brian Egolf	Dem	Brian Egolf	Dem
48th	Lucky Varela	Dem	Lucky Varela	Dem
49th	Don Tripp	Rep	Don Tripp	Rep
50th	Rhonda Sue King	Dem	Stephen Easley	Dem
51st	Yvette Herrell	Rep	Yvette Herrell	Rep
52nd	Joe Cervantes	Dem	Doreen Gallegos	Dem
53rd	Ricky Little	Rep	Nate Cote	Dem
54th	Bill Gray	Rep	Bill Gray	Rep
55th	Cathrynn Brown	Rep	Cathrynn Brown	Rep
56th	Zachary Cook	Rep	Zachary Cook	Rep
57th	New Seat		Jason Harper	Rep
58th	Candy Ezzell	Rep	Candy Ezzell	Rep
59th	Nora Espinoza	Rep	Nora Espinoza	Rep
60th	Tim Lewis	Rep	Tim Lewis	Rep
61st	Shirley Tyler	Rep	David Gallegos	Rep
62nd	Donald Bratton	Rep	Donald Bratton	Rep
63rd	George Dodge Jr.	Dem	George Dodge Jr.	Dem
64th	Anna Crook	Rep	Anna Crook	Rep
65th	James Madalena	Dem	James Madalena	Dem
66th	Bob Wooley	Rep	Bob Wooley	Rep
66th	Dennis Kintigh (Note: Redistricted from the 57th district.)	Rep	Bob Wooley	Rep
67th	Dennis Roch	Rep	Dennis Roch	Rep
68th	New Seat		Monica Youngblood	Rep
69th	Ken Martinez	Dem	Ken Martinez	Dem
70th	Richard Vigil	Dem	Tomás Salazar	Dem

Party	Candi- dates	Votes		Seats		
Party	Candi- dates	No.	%	No.	+/–	%
Democratic	52	337,158	50.41	38	▲2	54.29
Republican	53	325,276	48.63	32	▼1	45.71
Libertarian	1	2,477	0.37	0	Steady	0.00
Independent/write-in	3	3,902	0.58	0	▼1	0.00
Total	109	668,813	100%	70	Steady	100%

House seats
Democratic	54.29%
Republican	45.71%

Popular vote
Democratic	50.41%
Republican	48.63%
Independent/write-in	0.58%
Libertarian	0.37%

=== Incumbents defeated in the primary election ===
- Antonio Luján (D-District 35), defeated by Jeff Steinborn (D)
- Dennis Kintigh (R-District 66), (Note: Redistricted from the 57th district.) lost a redistricting race to Bob Wooley (R)
- Richard Vigil (D-District 70), defeated by Tomás Salazar (D)

=== Incumbents defeated in the general election ===
- Ray Begaye (D-District 4), defeated by Sharon Clahchischilliage (R)
- Conrad James (R-District 24), defeated by Liz Thomson (D)
- Andy Nuñez (I-District 36), defeated by Phillip Archuleta (D)
- James Hall (R-District 43), defeated by Stephanie Garcia Richard (D)
- Ricky Little (R-District 53), defeated by Nate Cote (D)

=== Newly created seats ===
- District 57, won by Jason Harper (R)
- District 68, won by Monica Youngblood (R)

== Predictions ==
Source	Ranking	As of
Governing	Lean D	October 24, 2012

== Detailed results ==
Source for primary election results:New Mexico Secretary of State Source for general election results:New Mexico Secretary of State

=== District 1 ===
Incumbent Republican Tom Taylor has represented the 1st district and its predecessors since 1999.

New Mexico House of Representatives 1st district general election, 2012
Party	Candidate	Votes	%
Republican	Tom Taylor (incumbent)	10,776	100%
Total votes		10,776	100%
Republican hold			

=== District 2 ===
Incumbent Republican James Strickler has represented the 2nd district since 2007.

New Mexico House of Representatives 2nd district general election, 2012
Party	Candidate	Votes	%
Republican	James Strickler (incumbent)	6,924	100%
Total votes		6,924	100%
Republican hold			

=== District 3 ===
Incumbent Republican Paul Bandy has represented the 3rd district since 2007.

New Mexico House of Representatives 3rd district general election, 2012
Party	Candidate	Votes	%
Republican	Paul Bandy (incumbent)	7,775	100%
Total votes		7,775	100%
Republican hold			

=== District 4 ===
Incumbent Democrat Ray Begaye has represented the 4th district since 1999. Begaye lost re-election to Republican Sharon Clahchischilliage. Democratic primary

New Mexico House of Representatives 4th district Democratic primary election, 2012
Party	Candidate	Votes	%
Democratic	Ray Begaye (incumbent)	1,081	69.83%
Democratic	Gary Montoya	467	30.17%
Total votes		1,548	100%

General election

New Mexico House of Representatives 4th district general election, 2012
Party	Candidate	Votes	%
Republican	Sharon Clahchischilliage	5,856	61.44%
Democratic	Ray Begaye (incumbent)	3,675	38.56%
Total votes		9,531	100%
Republican gain from Democratic			

=== District 5 ===
Incumbent Democrat Sandra Jeff has represented the 5th district since 2009. Democratic primary

New Mexico House of Representatives 5th district Democratic primary election, 2012
Party	Candidate	Votes	%
Democratic	Sandra Jeff (incumbent)	1,867	60.25%
Democratic	Charles Long	1,232	39.75%
Total votes		3,099	100%

General election

New Mexico House of Representatives 5th district general election, 2012
Party	Candidate	Votes	%
Democratic	Sandra Jeff (incumbent)	7,464	100%
Total votes		7,464	100%
Democratic hold			

=== District 6 ===
Incumbent Democrat Eliseo Alcon has represented the 6th district since 2009. Democratic primary

New Mexico House of Representatives 6th district Democratic primary election, 2012
Party	Candidate	Votes	%
Democratic	Eliseo Alcon (incumbent)	1,584	55.17%
Democratic	Billy Moore	1,287	44.83%
Total votes		2,871	100%

General election

New Mexico House of Representatives 6th district general election, 2012
Party	Candidate	Votes	%
Democratic	Eliseo Alcon (incumbent)	6,672	100%
Total votes		6,672	100%
Democratic hold			

=== District 7 ===
Incumbent Republican David Chavez has represented the 7th district since 2011. Chavez retired to run for the State Senate and fellow Republican Kelly Fajardo won the open seat. Democratic primary

New Mexico House of Representatives 7th district Democratic primary election, 2012
Party	Candidate	Votes	%
Democratic	Andrew Barreras	738	48.02%
Democratic	LeRoy Baca	406	26.42%
Democratic	Michelle Mares	393	25.57%
Total votes		1,537	100%

General election

New Mexico House of Representatives 7th district general election, 2012
Party	Candidate	Votes	%
Republican	Kelly Fajardo	4,522	50.43%
Democratic	Andrew Barreras	4,445	49.57%
Total votes		8,967	100%
Republican hold			

=== District 8 ===
Incumbent Republican Alonzo Baldonado has represented the 8th district since 2011.

New Mexico House of Representatives 8th district general election, 2012
Party	Candidate	Votes	%
Republican	Alonzo Baldonado (incumbent)	6,191	53.02%
Democratic	Frank Otero	5,486	46.98%
Total votes		11,677	100%
Republican hold			

=== District 9 ===
Incumbent Democrat Patricia Lundstrom has represented the 9th district since 2003.

New Mexico House of Representatives 9th district general election, 2012
Party	Candidate	Votes	%
Democratic	Patricia Lundstrom (incumbent)	6,246	100%
Total votes		6,246	100%
Democratic hold			

=== District 10 ===
Incumbent Democrat Henry Saavedra has represented the 10th district since 1977.

New Mexico House of Representatives 10th district general election, 2012
Party	Candidate	Votes	%
Democratic	Henry Saavedra (incumbent)	5,954	100%
Total votes		5,954	100%
Democratic hold			

=== District 11 ===
Incumbent Democrat Rick Miera has represented the 11th district since 1991.

New Mexico House of Representatives 11th district general election, 2012
Party	Candidate	Votes	%
Democratic	Rick Miera (incumbent)	10,103	100%
Total votes		10,103	100%
Democratic hold			

=== District 12 ===
Incumbent Democrat Ernest Chavez has represented the 12th district since 2005.

New Mexico House of Representatives 12th district general election, 2012
Party	Candidate	Votes	%
Democratic	Ernest Chavez (incumbent)	4,736	71.84%
Republican	Clyde Wheeler	1,856	28.16%
Total votes		6,592	100%
Democratic hold			

=== District 13 ===
Incumbent Democrat Eleanor Chavez has represented the 13th district since 2009. Chavez retired to run for the state senate and fellow Democrat Patricia Roybal Caballero won the open seat.

New Mexico House of Representatives 13th district general election, 2012
Party	Candidate	Votes	%
Democratic	Patricia Roybal Caballero	4,452	71.53%
Republican	Jose Orozco	1,772	28.47%
Total votes		6,224	100%
Democratic hold			

=== District 14 ===
Incumbent Democrat Miguel Garcia has represented the 14th district since 1997.

New Mexico House of Representatives 14th district general election, 2012
Party	Candidate	Votes	%
Democratic	Miguel Garcia (incumbent)	5,743	73.20%
Republican	Clara Pena	2,103	26.80%
Total votes		7,846	100%
Democratic hold			

=== District 15 ===
Incumbent Democrat Bill O'Neill has represented the 15th district since 2009. O'Neill retired to run for the State Senate and fellow Democrat Emily Kane won the open seat. Democratic primary

New Mexico House of Representatives 15th district Democratic primary election, 2012
Party	Candidate	Votes	%
Democratic	Emily Kane	962	44.50%
Democratic	Matt David Munoz	811	37.51%
Democratic	Joe Craig	389	17.99%
Total votes		2,162	100%

Republican primary

New Mexico House of Representatives 15th district Republican primary election, 2012
Party	Candidate	Votes	%
Republican	Christopher Saucedo	898	61.85%
Republican	Kenneth King	554	38.15%
Total votes		1,452	100%

General election

New Mexico House of Representatives 15th district general election, 2012
Party	Candidate	Votes	%
Democratic	Emily Kane	6,850	51.17%
Republican	Christopher Saucedo	6,536	48.83%
Total votes		13,386	100%
Democratic hold			

=== District 16 ===
Incumbent Democrat Moe Maestas has represented the 16th district since 2007.

New Mexico House of Representatives 16th district general election, 2012
Party	Candidate	Votes	%
Democratic	Moe Maestas (incumbent)	8,162	100%
Total votes		8,162	100%
Democratic hold			

=== District 17 ===
Incumbent Democrat Edward Sandoval has represented the 17th district since 1983.

New Mexico House of Representatives 17th district general election, 2012
Party	Candidate	Votes	%
Democratic	Edward Sandoval (incumbent)	7,816	66.61%
Republican	Robert Cain	3,918	33.39%
Total votes		11,734	100%
Democratic hold			

=== District 18 ===
Incumbent Democrat Gail Chasey has represented the 18th district since 1997.

New Mexico House of Representatives 18th district general election, 2012
Party	Candidate	Votes	%
Democratic	Gail Chasey (incumbent)	10,034	81.10%
Republican	Tyson Jerald Cosper	2,339	18.90%
Total votes		12,373	100%
Democratic hold			

=== District 19 ===
Incumbent Democrat Sheryl Williams Stapleton has represented the 19th district since 1995. Democratic primary

New Mexico House of Representatives 19th district Democratic primary election, 2012
Party	Candidate	Votes	%
Democratic	Sheryl Williams Stapleton (incumbent)	1,533	56.95%
Democratic	Cara Valente-Compton	1,159	43.05%
Total votes		2,692	100%

General election

New Mexico House of Representatives 19th district general election, 2012
Party	Candidate	Votes	%
Democratic	Sheryl Williams Stapleton (incumbent)	6,669	59.35%
Republican	Erica Landry	2,711	24.13%
Independent	Hessel Edward Yntema III	1,857	16.53%
Total votes		11,237	100%
Democratic hold			

=== District 20 ===
Incumbent Republican James White has represented the 20th district since 2009.

New Mexico House of Representatives 20th district general election, 2012
Party	Candidate	Votes	%
Republican	James White (incumbent)	8,717	100%
Total votes		8,717	100%
Republican hold			

=== District 21 ===
Incumbent Democrat Mimi Stewart has represented the 21st district since 2009.

New Mexico House of Representatives 21st district general election, 2012
Party	Candidate	Votes	%
Democratic	Mimi Stewart (incumbent)	4,961	100%
Total votes		4,961	100%
Democratic hold			

=== District 22 ===
Incumbent Republican James Smith has represented the 22nd district since 2011.

New Mexico House of Representatives 22nd district general election, 2012
Party	Candidate	Votes	%
Republican	James Smith (incumbent)	11,692	100%
Total votes		11,692	100%
Republican hold			

=== District 23 ===
Incumbent Republican David Doyle has represented the 23rd district since 2011. Doyle retired to run for the state senate and fellow Republican Paul Pacheco won the open seat. Democratic primary

New Mexico House of Representatives 23rd district Democratic primary election, 2012
Party	Candidate	Votes	%
Democratic	Marci Blaze	1,027	50.74%
Democratic	Marilyn Hill	856	42.29%
Democratic	Dixie Trebbe	141	6.97%
Total votes		2,024	100%

General election

New Mexico House of Representatives 23rd district general election, 2012
Party	Candidate	Votes	%
Republican	Paul Pacheco	6,922	50.28%
Democratic	Marci Blaze	6,844	49.72%
Total votes		13,766	100%
Republican hold			

=== District 24 ===
Incumbent Republican Conrad James has represented the 24th district since 2011. James lost re-election to Democrat Liz Thomson.

New Mexico House of Representatives 24th district general election, 2012
Party	Candidate	Votes	%
Democratic	Liz Thomson	6,562	51.05%
Republican	Conrad James (incumbent)	6,292	48.95%
Total votes		12,854	100%
Democratic gain from Republican			

=== District 25 ===
Incumbent Democrat Danice Picraux has represented the 25th district since 1991. Picraux didn't seek re-election and fellow Democrat Christine Trujillo won the open seat. Democratic primary

New Mexico House of Representatives 25th district Democratic primary election, 2012
Party	Candidate	Votes	%
Democratic	Christine Trujillo	1,652	62.22%
Democratic	Brian Thomas	545	20.53%
Democratic	Richard Williams	458	17.25%
Total votes		2,655	100%

Republican primary

New Mexico House of Representatives 25th district Republican primary election, 2012
Party	Candidate	Votes	%
Republican	Elisabeth Keen	960	76.74%
Republican	Nicholas Cates Riali	291	23.26%
Total votes		1,251	100%

General election

New Mexico House of Representatives 25th district general election, 2012
Party	Candidate	Votes	%
Democratic	Christine Trujillo	8,383	63.12%
Republican	Elisabeth Keen	4,898	36.88%
Total votes		13,281	100%
Democratic hold			

=== District 26 ===
Incumbent Democrat Al Park has represented the 26th district since 2001. Park retired to run for the New Mexico Public Regulation Commission and fellow Democrat Georgene Louis won the open seat.

New Mexico House of Representatives 26th district general election, 2012
Party	Candidate	Votes	%
Democratic	Georgene Louis	4,057	61.71%
Republican	Louis Tafoya	2,517	38.29%
Total votes		6,574	100%
Democratic hold			

=== District 27 ===
Incumbent Republican Larry Larrañaga has represented the 27th district since 1995.

New Mexico House of Representatives 27th district general election, 2012
Party	Candidate	Votes	%
Republican	Larry Larrañaga (incumbent)	9,128	59.04%
Democratic	Ronald Krise	6,334	40.96%
Total votes		15,462	100%
Republican hold			

=== District 28 ===
Incumbent Republican Jimmie Hall has represented the 28th district since 2005.

New Mexico House of Representatives 28th district general election, 2012
Party	Candidate	Votes	%
Republican	Jimmie Hall (incumbent)	10,815	100%
Total votes		10,815	100%
Republican hold			

=== District 29 ===
Incumbent Republican Thomas Anderson has represented the 29th district since 2003. Republican primary

New Mexico House of Representatives 29th district Republican primary election, 2012
Party	Candidate	Votes	%
Republican	Thomas Anderson (incumbent)	679	57.49%
Republican	Peggy Muller-Aragon	502	42.51%
Total votes		1,181	100%

General election

New Mexico House of Representatives 29th district general election, 2012
Party	Candidate	Votes	%
Republican	Thomas Anderson (incumbent)	6,025	52.50%
Democratic	Lloyd Ginsberg	5,451	47.50%
Total votes		11,476	100%
Republican hold			

=== District 30 ===
Incumbent Republican Nate Gentry has represented the 30th district since 2011.

New Mexico House of Representatives 30th district general election, 2012
Party	Candidate	Votes	%
Republican	Nate Gentry (incumbent)	6,997	53.91%
Democratic	Maryellen Broderick	5,981	46.09%
Total votes		12,978	100%
Republican hold			

=== District 31 ===
Incumbent Republican Bill Rehm has represented the 31st district since 2007. Republican primary

New Mexico House of Representatives 31st district Republican primary election, 2012
Party	Candidate	Votes	%
Republican	Bill Rehm (incumbent)	1,898	63.63%
Republican	William Arnold Wiley	1,085	36.37%
Total votes		2,983	100%

General election

New Mexico House of Representatives 31st district general election, 2012
Party	Candidate	Votes	%
Republican	Bill Rehm (incumbent)	10,426	60.13%
Democratic	Joanne Allen	6,914	39.87%
Total votes		17,340	100%
Republican hold			

=== District 32 ===
Incumbent Democrat Dona Irwin has represented the 32nd district since 1999. Democratic primary

New Mexico House of Representatives 32nd district Democratic primary, 2012
Party	Candidate	Votes	%
Democratic	Dona Irwin (incumbent)	1,309	54.52%
Democratic	Louis Luna	1,092	45.48%
Total votes		2,401	100%

General election

New Mexico House of Representatives 32nd district general election, 2012
Party	Candidate	Votes	%
Democratic	Dona Irwin (incumbent)	5,688	63.80%
Republican	Thomas Guerra	3,228	36.20%
Total votes		8,916	100%
Democratic hold			

=== District 33 ===
Incumbent Democrat Joni Gutierrez has represented the 33rd district since 2005. Guttierrez didn't seek re-election and fellow Democrat Bill McCamley won the open seat.

New Mexico House of Representatives 33rd district general election, 2012
Party	Candidate	Votes	%
Democratic	Bill McCamley	5,972	58.17%
Republican	Angelina Carver	4,294	41.83%
Total votes		10,266	100%
Democratic hold			

=== District 34 ===
Incumbent Democrat Mary Helen Garcia has represented the 34th district since 1997.

New Mexico House of Representatives 34th district general election, 2012
Party	Candidate	Votes	%
Democratic	Mary Helen Garcia (incumbent)	4,891	100%
Total votes		4,891	100%
Democratic hold			

=== District 35 ===
Incumbent Democrat Antonio Luján has represented the 35th district since 2003. Luján lost re-nomination to fellow Democrat Jeff Steinborn, who went on to win the general election. Democratic primary

New Mexico House of Representatives 35th district Democratic primary election, 2012
Party	Candidate	Votes	%
Democratic	Jeff Steinborn	792	51.30%
Democratic	Antonio Luján (incumbent)	752	48.70%
Total votes		1,544	100%

General election

New Mexico House of Representatives 35th district general election, 2012
Party	Candidate	Votes	%
Democratic	Jeff Steinborn	6,318	64.65%
Republican	Charles Green	3,455	35.35%
Total votes		9,773	100%
Democratic hold			

=== District 36 ===
Incumbent Democrat turned independent Andy Nuñez has represented the 36th district since 2001. He lost re-election to Democrat Phillip Archuleta.

New Mexico House of Representatives 36th district general election, 2012
Party	Candidate	Votes	%
Democratic	Phillip Archuleta	3,785	42.35%
Republican	Mike Tellez	3,295	36.87%
Independent	Andy Nuñez (incumbent)	1,858	20.79%
Total votes		8,938	100%
Democratic gain from Independent			

=== District 37 ===
Incumbent Republican Terry McMillan has represented the 37th district since 2011.

New Mexico House of Representatives 37th district general election, 2012
Party	Candidate	Votes	%
Republican	Terry McMillan (incumbent)	6,267	50.03%
Democratic	Joanne Ferrary	6,259	49.97%
Total votes		12,526	100%
Republican hold			

=== District 38 ===
Incumbent Republican Dianne Hamilton has represented the 38th district since 1999. Democratic primary

New Mexico House of Representatives 38th district Democratic primary election, 2012
Party	Candidate	Votes	%
Democratic	Terry Fortenberry	1,499	57.48%
Democratic	Guadalupe Cano	1,109	42.52%
Total votes		2,608	100%

General election

New Mexico House of Representatives 38th district general election, 2012
Party	Candidate	Votes	%
Republican	Dianne Hamilton (incumbent)	7,183	54.85%
Democratic	Terry Fortenberry	5,912	45.15%
Total votes		13,095	100%
Republican hold			

=== District 39 ===
Incumbent Democrat Rodolpho Martinez has represented the 39th district since 2007.

New Mexico House of Representatives 39th district general election, 2012
Party	Candidate	Votes	%
Democratic	Rodolpho Martinez (incumbent)	5,135	52.18%
Republican	John Zimmerman	4,705	47.82%
Total votes		9,840	100%
Democratic hold			

=== District 40 ===
The new 40th district includes the homes of incumbent Democrats Nick Salazar, who has represented the 40th district since 1974, and Thomas Garcia, who has represented the 68th district since 2007. Garcia retired to run for the state senate and Salazar was re-elected here. Democratic primary

New Mexico House of Representatives 40th district Democratic primary election, 2012
Party	Candidate	Votes	%
Democratic	Nick Salazar (incumbent)	2,908	51.56%
Democratic	Bengie Regensberg	1,420	25.18%
Democratic	Peter Martinez	1,312	23.26%
Total votes		5,640	100%

General election

New Mexico House of Representatives 40th district general election, 2012
Party	Candidate	Votes	%
Democratic	Nick Salazar (incumbent)	7,901	65.97%
Republican	Gary Martinez	4,076	34.03%
Total votes		11,977	100%
Democratic hold			

=== District 41 ===
Incumbent Democrat Debbie Rodella has represented the 41st district since 1993.

New Mexico House of Representatives 41st district general election, 2012
Party	Candidate	Votes	%
Democratic	Debbie Rodella (incumbent)	8,302	100%
Total votes		8,302	100%
Democratic hold			

=== District 42 ===
Incumbent Democrat Roberto Gonzales has represented the 42nd district since 1995.

New Mexico House of Representatives 42nd district general election, 2012
Party	Candidate	Votes	%
Democratic	Roberto Gonzales (incumbent)	10,344	100%
Total votes		10,344	100%
Democratic hold			

=== District 43 ===
Incumbent Republican James Hall has represented the 43rd district since his appointment in 2011, following the death of Jeannette Wallace. Hall lost re-election to Democrat Stephanie Garcia Richard.

New Mexico House of Representatives 43rd district general election, 2012
Party	Candidate	Votes	%
Democratic	Stephanie Garcia Richard	7,119	51.19%
Republican	James Hall (incumbent)	6,788	48.81%
Total votes		13,907	100%
Democratic gain from Republican			

=== District 44 ===
Incumbent Republican Jane Powdrell-Culbert has represented the 44th district since 2003.

New Mexico House of Representatives 44th district general election, 2012
Party	Candidate	Votes	%
Republican	Jane Powdrell-Culbert (incumbent)	10,136	100%
Total votes		10,136	100%
Republican hold			

=== District 45 ===
Incumbent Democrat Jim Trujillo has represented the 45th district since 2003.

New Mexico House of Representatives 45th district general election, 2012
Party	Candidate	Votes	%
Democratic	Jim Trujillo (incumbent)	8,881	100%
Total votes		8,881	100%
Democratic hold			

=== District 46 ===
Incumbent Democrat House Speaker Ben Luján has represented the 46th district since 1975. Luján didn't seek re-election and fellow Democrat Carl Trujillo won the open seat. Democratic primary

New Mexico House of Representatives 46th district Democratic primary election, 2012
Party	Candidate	Votes	%
Democratic	Carl Trujillo	2,515	52.19%
Democratic	David Coss	2,304	47.81%
Total votes		4,819	100%

General election

New Mexico House of Representatives 46th district general election, 2012
Party	Candidate	Votes	%
Democratic	Carl Trujillo	11,082	100%
Total votes		11,082	100%
Democratic hold			

=== District 47 ===
Incumbent Democrat Brian Egolf has represented the 47th district since 2009.

New Mexico House of Representatives 47th district general election, 2012
Party	Candidate	Votes	%
Democratic	Brian Egolf (incumbent)	13,472	100%
Total votes		13,472	100%
Democratic hold			

=== District 48 ===
Incumbent Democrat Lucky Varela has represented the 48th district since 1987.

New Mexico House of Representatives 48th district general election, 2012
Party	Candidate	Votes	%
Democratic	Lucky Varela (incumbent)	9,655	79.58%
Libertarian	Bob Walsh	2,477	20.42%
Total votes		12,132	100%
Democratic hold			

=== District 49 ===
Incumbent Republican Don Tripp has represented the 49th district since 1999.

New Mexico House of Representatives 49th district general election, 2012
Party	Candidate	Votes	%
Republican	Don Tripp (incumbent)	9,213	98.01%
Democratic	Dell Washington (write-in)	187	1.99%
Total votes		9,400	100%
Republican hold			

=== District 50 ===
Incumbent Democrat Rhonda Sue King has represented the 50th district since 1999. King didn't seek re-election and fellow Democrat Stephen Easley won the open seat. Democratic primary election

New Mexico House of Representatives 50th district Democratic primary election, 2012
Party	Candidate	Votes	%
Democratic	Stephen Easley	1,459	56.59%
Democratic	Patricia Lincoln	1,119	43.41%
Total votes		2,578	100%

General election

New Mexico House of Representatives 50th district general election, 2012
Party	Candidate	Votes	%
Democratic	Stephen Easley	7,796	55.66%
Republican	Charles Larry Miller	6,211	44.34%
Total votes		14,007	100%
Democratic hold			

=== District 51 ===
Incumbent Republican Yvette Herrell has represented the 51st district since 2011.

New Mexico House of Representatives 51st district general election, 2012
Party	Candidate	Votes	%
Republican	Yvette Herrell (incumbent)	7,750	100%
Total votes		7,750	100%
Republican hold			

=== District 52 ===
Incumbent Democrat Joe Cervantes has represented the 52nd district since 2001. Cervantes retired to run for the state senate and fellow Democrat Doreen Gallegos won the open seat. Democratic primary

New Mexico House of Representatives 52nd district Democratic primary election, 2012
Party	Candidate	Votes	%
Democratic	Doreen Gallegos	698	73.17%
Democratic	Andrew Moralez	256	26.83%
Total votes		954	100%

General election

New Mexico House of Representatives 52nd district general election, 2012
Party	Candidate	Votes	%
Democratic	Doreen Gallegos	4,720	64.44%
Republican	Arlington Brewbaker	2,605	35.56%
Total votes		7,325	100%
Democratic hold			

=== District 53 ===
Incumbent Republican Ricky Little has represented the 53rd district since 2011. Little lost re-election to Democrat Nate Cote, who previously represented the district from 2007 to 2011.

New Mexico House of Representatives 53rd district general election, 2012
Party	Candidate	Votes	%
Democratic	Nate Cote	2,620	53.21%
Republican	Ricky Little (incumbent)	2,304	46.79%
Total votes		4,924	100%
Democratic gain from Republican			

=== District 54 ===
Incumbent Republican Bill Gray has represented the 54th district since 2007.

New Mexico House of Representatives 54th district general election, 2012
Party	Candidate	Votes	%
Republican	Bill Gray (incumbent)	7,465	100%
Total votes		7,465	100%
Republican hold			

=== District 55 ===
Incumbent Republican Cathrynn Brown has represented the 55th district since 2011.

New Mexico House of Representatives 55th district general election, 2012
Party	Candidate	Votes	%
Republican	Cathrynn Brown (incumbent)	8,853	100%
Total votes		8,853	100%
Republican hold			

=== District 56 ===
Incumbent Republican Zachary Cook has represented the 56th district since 2009.

New Mexico House of Representatives 56th district general election, 2012
Party	Candidate	Votes	%
Republican	Zachary Cook (incumbent)	7,721	100%
Total votes		7,721	100%
Republican hold			

=== District 57 ===
The new 57th district includes part of Sandoval County, including Rio Rancho. The district has no incumbent. Republican Jason Harper won the open seat.

New Mexico House of Representatives 57th district general election, 2012
Party	Candidate	Votes	%
Republican	Jason Harper	4,606	53.16%
Democratic	Donna Tillman	4,058	46.84%
Total votes		8,664	100%
Republican win (new seat)			

=== District 58 ===
Incumbent Republican Candy Ezzell has represented the 58th district since 2005.

New Mexico House of Representatives 58th district general election, 2012
Party	Candidate	Votes	%
Republican	Candy Ezzell (incumbent)	3,888	62.00%
Democratic	Pablo Martinez	2,383	38.00%
Total votes		6,271	100%
Republican hold			

=== District 59 ===
Incumbent Republican Nora Espinoza has represented the 59th district since 2007.

New Mexico House of Representatives 59th district general election, 2012
Party	Candidate	Votes	%
Republican	Nora Espinoza (incumbent)	9,903	100%
Total votes		9,903	100%
Republican hold			

=== District 60 ===
Incumbent Republican Tim Lewis has represented the 60th district since 2011.

New Mexico House of Representatives 60th district general election, 2012
Party	Candidate	Votes	%
Republican	Tim Lewis (incumbent)	8,319	100%
Total votes		8,319	100%
Republican hold			

=== District 61 ===
Incumbent Republican Shirley Tyler has represented the 61st district since 2007. Tyler didn't seek re-election and fellow Republican David Gallegos won the open seat. Democratic primary

New Mexico House of Representatives 61st district Democratic primary election, 2012
Party	Candidate	Votes	%
Democratic	Hector Ramirez	309	53.09%
Democratic	Paul Phillip Roybal	273	46.91%
Total votes		582	100%

General election

New Mexico House of Representatives 61st district general election, 2012
Party	Candidate	Votes	%
Republican	David Gallegos	3,654	64.47%
Democratic	Hector Ramirez	2,014	35.53%
Total votes		5,668	100%
Republican hold			

=== District 62 ===
Incumbent Republican Minority Leader Donald Bratton has represented the 62nd district since 2001.

New Mexico House of Representatives 62nd district general election, 2012
Party	Candidate	Votes	%
Republican	Donald Bratton (incumbent)	7,722	100%
Total votes		7,722	100%
Republican hold			

=== District 63 ===
Incumbent Democrat George Dodge Jr. has represented the 63rd district since 2011. Democratic primary

New Mexico House of Representatives 63rd district Democratic primary election, 2012
Party	Candidate	Votes	%
Democratic	George Dodge Jr. (incumbent)	1,544	79.67%
Democratic	Jose Griego	394	20.33%
Total votes		1,938	100%

General election

New Mexico House of Representatives 63rd district general election, 2012
Party	Candidate	Votes	%
Democratic	George Dodge Jr. (incumbent)	4,881	63.53%
Republican	Steven Hanson	2,802	36.47%
Total votes		7,683	100%
Democratic hold			

=== District 64 ===
Incumbent Republican Anna Crook has represented the 64th district since 1995. Republican primary

New Mexico House of Representatives 64th district Republican primary election, 2012
Party	Candidate	Votes	%
Republican	Anna Crook (incumbent)	2,434	88.83%
Republican	Wade Lopez	306	11.17%
Total votes		2,740	100%

General election

New Mexico House of Representatives 64th district general election, 2012
Party	Candidate	Votes	%
Republican	Anna Crook (incumbent)	7,646	100%
Total votes		7,646	100%
Republican hold			

=== District 65 ===
Incumbent Democrat James Madalena has represented the 65th district since 1985.

New Mexico House of Representatives 65th district general election, 2012
Party	Candidate	Votes	%
Democratic	James Madalena (incumbent)	7,072	100%
Total votes		7,072	100%
Democratic hold			

=== District 66 ===
The new 66th district includes the homes of incumbent Republicans Bob Wooley, who has represented the 66th district since 2011, and Dennis Kintigh, who has represented the 57th district since 2009. Wooley defeated Kintigh in the Republican primary and was unopposed in the general election. Republican primary

New Mexico House of Representatives 66th district Republican primary election, 2012
Party	Candidate	Votes	%
Republican	Bob Wooley (incumbent)	1,600	55.52%
Republican	Dennis Kintigh (incumbent)	1,282	44.48%
Total votes		2,882	100%

General election

New Mexico House of Representatives 66th district general election, 2012
Party	Candidate	Votes	%
Republican	Bob Wooley (incumbent)	8,079	100%
Total votes		8,079	100%
Republican hold			

=== District 67 ===
Incumbent Republican Dennis Roch has represented the 67th district since 2009.

New Mexico House of Representatives 67th district general election, 2012
Party	Candidate	Votes	%
Republican	Dennis Roch (incumbent)	8,492	100%
Total votes		8,492	100%
Republican hold			

=== District 68 ===
The new 68th district includes part of northwestern Bernalillo County. The district has no incumbent. Republican Monica Youngblood won the open seat. Republican primary

New Mexico House of Representatives 68th district Republican primary election, 2012
Party	Candidate	Votes	%
Republican	Monica Youngblood	763	44.70%
Republican	Max Barnett	473	27.71%
Republican	Claudette Chavez-Hankins	346	20.27%
Republican	Paul Barber	125	7.32%
Total votes		1,707	100%

General election

New Mexico House of Representatives 68th district general election, 2012
Party	Candidate	Votes	%
Republican	Monica Youngblood	6,908	54.96%
Democratic	Eloise Gift	5,660	45.04%
Total votes		12,568	100%
Republican win (new seat)			

=== District 69 ===
Incumbent Democrat and Majority Leader Ken Martinez had represented the 69th district since 1999.

New Mexico House of Representatives 69th district general election, 2012
Party	Candidate	Votes	%
Democratic	Ken Martinez (incumbent)	6,803	100%
Total votes		6,803	100%
Democratic hold			

=== District 70 ===
Incumbent Democrat Richard Vigil has represented the 70th district since 1999. Vigil lost re-nomination to fellow Democrat Tomás Salazar, who was unopposed in the general election. Democratic primary

New Mexico House of Representatives 70th district Democratic primary election, 2012
Party	Candidate	Votes	%
Democratic	Tomás Salazar	2,526	55.27%
Democratic	Richard Vigil (incumbent)	2,044	44.73%
Total votes		4,570	100%

General election

New Mexico House of Representatives 70th district general election, 2012
Party	Candidate	Votes	%
Democratic	Tomás Salazar	8,441	100%
Total votes		8,441	100%
Democratic hold			

== See also ==
- 2012 United States elections
- 2012 United States House of Representatives elections in New Mexico
- Elections in New Mexico
