= Sharon Clahchischilliage =

American politician

Member of New Mexico Public Education Commission from the 5th district
- Incumbent
- Assumed office January 1, 2023
- Governor: Michelle Lujan Grisham
- Preceded by: Georgiana Davis

Member of the New Mexico House of Representatives from the 4th district
- In office January 15, 2013 – December 31, 2018
- Preceded by: Ray Begaye
- Succeeded by: Anthony Allison

Personal details
- Born: June 18, 1948 (age 78) Farmington, New Mexico, U.S.
- Citizenship: American; Navajo Nation
- Party: Republican
- Education: University of New Mexico (attended); Eastern New Mexico University (BS); University of Pennsylvania (MSW)
- Website: Campaign website

Sharon E. Clahchischilliage (born 1947/1948) is an American politician and a former Republican member of the New Mexico House of Representatives, representing District 4 from 2013–2018. She was elected to the New Mexico Public Education Commission from District 5 in 2022. A citizen of the Navajo Nation, she ran unsuccessfully for New Mexico's 3rd congressional district in the 2024 congressional election against incumbent Teresa Leger Fernández.

== Early life and education ==
Clahchischilliage was born into a Navajo family, the daughter of Eleanor and Herb Clah in Farmington, New Mexico, and is a member of the Navajo Nation. Clahchischilliage attended the University of New Mexico, earned her BS in education from Eastern New Mexico University, and earned her MA in social work from the University of Pennsylvania.

== Career ==
Clahchischilliage has had a variety of teaching and psychiatric social work experience, including as a special education teacher. Working on Indian and tribal health issues, including as Lieutenant, Commissioned Corps Officer, United States Public Health Service and for the Indian Health Service, Clahchischilliage became involved in large programs.

She entered politics when appointed as Tribal Affairs Officer, Children, Youth and Families (CYFD), Office of the Cabinet Secretary, The State of New Mexico. She has also served in top positions in the Navajo Nation (the largest federally-recognized tribe in the United States) as Acting Executive Director, Office of Government Development, Office of the Speaker, The Navajo Nation, 2010–present; and as Senior Programs/Projects Specialist, Division of Transportation, Navajo Nation. Her district includes part of West Albuquerque, New Mexico.

== Personal life ==
She is married and has five children.

== Elections ==
Clahchischilliage has run for office on numerous occasions as a Republican. In 2002, she challenged incumbent Democratic Secretary of State of New Mexico Rebecca Vigil-Giron; she was unopposed in the Republican primary, but lost the general election by 58%–42%. In 2012, she was nominated unopposed as the Republican candidate for the fourth district of the New Mexico House of Representatives, against incumbent Democratic state representative Ray Begaye; she was victorious in the November general election, securing 61.4% of the vote. She successfully held this seat in the 2014 and 2016 elections, with decreasing margins of victory; she was defeated in her third bid for re-election by Democrat Anthony Allison in 2018.

In 2019, she ran in the election for the Central Consolidated Schools school board, in Shiprock, New Mexico; coming third out of five candidates, winning a majority of votes in one of six precincts. In 2022, she was elected unopposed as the District 5 representative to the New Mexico Public Education Commission. In 2024, she was unopposed in the Republican primary for New Mexico's 3rd congressional seat, but lost the general election by 56.3%–43.7% against incumbent Democratic representative Teresa Leger Fernández in the November general election.

== See also ==
- Native American women in politics
