= 2024 United States House of Representatives elections in New Mexico =

- November 5, 2024

All 3 New Mexico seats to the United States House of Representatives
- Turnout: 64.83% ▲
	Majority party	Minority party
Party	Democratic	Republican
Last election	3	0
Seats won	3	0
Seat change	Steady	Steady
Popular vote	493,722	402,776
Percentage	55.07%	44.93%
Swing	▲0.01%	Steady

Democratic
50–60%
60–70%
70–80%
Republican
50–60%
60–70%
70–80%

The 2024 United States House of Representatives elections in New Mexico were held on November 5, 2024, to elect the three U.S. representatives from the State of New Mexico, one from all three of the state's congressional districts. The elections coincided with the 2024 U.S. presidential election, as well as other elections to the House of Representatives, elections to the United States Senate, and various state and local elections. The primary elections occurred on June 4, 2024.

== Background ==
New Mexico's map faced a lawsuit alleging partisan gerrymandering diluting the voting power of Republicans in the 2nd congressional district. A state judge ruled to keep the current map in place, and that decision was upheld by the New Mexico Supreme Court, with all five justices stating that the congressional map was not an "egregious" gerrymander in a ruling on November 27, 2023.

== Overview ==
=== Statewide ===
Party	Candi- dates	Votes		Seats	
Party	Candi- dates	No.	%	No.	+/–
Democratic Party	3	493,722	55.07%	3	Steady
Republican Party	3	402,776	44.93%	0	Steady
Total	6	896,498	100.00%	28	Steady

Popular vote
Democratic	55.07%
Republican	44.93%

House seats
Democratic	100.00%

=== District ===
Results of the 2024 United States House of Representatives elections in New Mexico by district:

District	Democratic		Republican		Total		Result
District	Votes	%	Votes	%	Votes	%	Result
District 1	193,203	56.37%	149,546	43.63%	342,749	100.00%	Democratic hold
District 2	138,177	52.08%	127,145	47.92%	265,322	100.00%	Democratic hold
District 3	162,342	56.29%	126,085	43.71%	288,427	100.00%	Democratic hold
Total	493,722	55.07%	402,776	44.93%	896,498	100.00%	

=== County ===
County	Democratic		Republican		Margin		Total votes cast
County	#	%	#	%	#	%	Total votes cast
Bernalillo	183,413	61.00%	117,281	39.00%	66,132	21.99%	300,694
Catron	612	26.75%	1,676	73.25%	-1,064	-46.50%	2,288
Chaves	6,793	31.88%	14,513	68.12%	-7,720	-36.23%	21,306
Cibola	4,883	55.77%	3,872	44.23%	1,011	11.55%	8,755
Colfax	2,860	50.26%	2,830	49.74%	30	0.53%	5,690
Curry	4,643	31.92%	9,904	68.08%	-5,261	-36.17%	14,547
De Baca	219	26.29%	614	73.71%	-395	-47.42%	833
Doña Ana	48,358	57.76%	35,361	42.24%	12,997	15.52%	83,719
Eddy	5,932	25.96%	16,922	74.04%	-10,990	-48.09%	22,854
Grant	7,771	55.62%	6,200	44.38%	1,571	11.24%	13,971
Guadalupe	1,027	57.41%	762	42.59%	265	14.81%	1,789
Harding	156	38.05%	254	61.95%	-98	-23.90%	410
Hidalgo	776	42.92%	1,032	57.08%	-256	-14.16%	1,808
Lea	4,610	22.72%	15,684	77.28%	-11,074	-54.57%	20,294
Lincoln	3,071	31.06%	6,815	68.94%	-3,744	-37.87%	9,886
Los Alamos	7,664	64.16%	4,282	35.84%	3,382	28.31%	11,946
Luna	3,653	46.69%	4,171	53.31%	-518	-6.62%	7,824
McKinley	16,547	66.26%	8,426	33.74%	8,121	32.52%	24,973
Mora	1,741	72.66%	655	27.34%	1,086	45.33%	2,396
Otero	9,167	38.83%	14,444	61.17%	-5,277	-22.35%	23,611
Quay	1,223	34.75%	2,296	65.25%	-1,073	-30.49%	3,519
Rio Arriba	10,779	70.45%	4,521	29.55%	6,258	40.90%	15,300
Roosevelt	2,014	31.21%	4,440	68.79%	-2,426	-37.59%	6,454
San Juan	17,152	33.51%	34,040	66.49%	-16,888	-32.99%	51,192
San Miguel	8,015	74.13%	2,797	25.87%	5,218	48.26%	10,812
Sandoval	41,359	53.30%	36,243	46.70%	5,116	6.59%	77,602
Santa Fe	63,072	77.12%	18,707	22.88%	44,365	54.25%	81,779
Sierra	2,456	42.16%	3,370	57.84%	-914	-15.69%	5,826
Socorro	3,693	52.10%	3,395	47.90%	298	4.20%	7,088
Taos	12,902	79.72%	3,282	20.28%	9,620	59.44%	16,184
Torrance	2,280	32.47%	4,741	67.53%	-2,461	-35.05%	7,021
Union	464	29.20%	1,125	70.80%	-661	-41.60%	1,589
Valencia	14,417	44.31%	18,121	55.69%	-3,704	-11.38%	32,538
Totals	493,722	55.07%	402,776	44.93%	90,946	10.14%	896,498

=== Counties that flipped from Republican to Democratic ===
- Colfax (largest city: Raton)

== District 1 ==
2024 New Mexico's 1st congressional district election
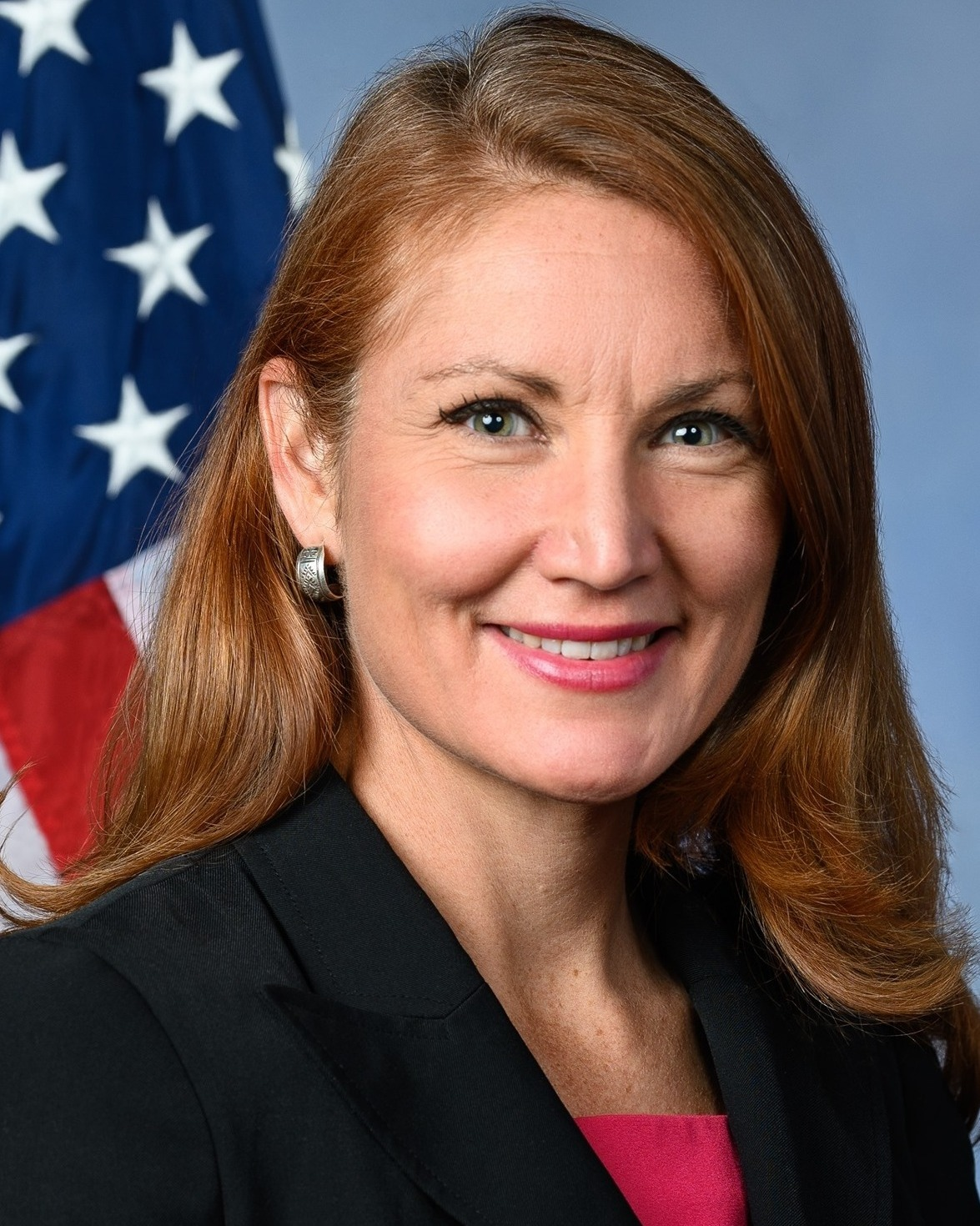

Nominee	Melanie Stansbury	Steve Jones
Party	Democratic	Republican
Popular vote	193,203	149,546
Percentage	56.4%	43.6%
- Stansbury: 50–60% 60–70% 70–80% 80–90% >90% Jones: 50–60% 60–70% 70–80% 80–90% >90% Tie: 50%
U.S. Representative before election
Melanie Stansbury
Democratic
Elected U.S. Representative
Melanie Stansbury
Democratic

The 1st district covers the center of the state, taking in the counties of Torrance, Guadalupe, De Baca, and Lincoln, as well as eastern Bernalillo County and most of Albuquerque. The incumbent was Democrat Melanie Stansbury, who was re-elected with 55.75% of the vote in 2022.

=== Democratic primary ===
==== Nominee ====
- Melanie Stansbury, incumbent U.S. representative (2021–present)

==== Endorsements ====
Melanie Stansbury

Organizations

- 314 Action
- Giffords
- Humane Society Legislative Fund
- J Street
- League of Conservation Voters
- Natural Resources Defense Council
- Planned Parenthood Action Fund
- Population Connection Action Fund

Labor unions

- AFSCME Council 18

==== Fundraising ====
Campaign finance reports as of May 15, 2024
Candidate	Raised	Spent	Cash on hand
Melanie Stansbury (D)	$780,996	$601,653	$190,683
Source: Federal Election Commission

==== Results ====
Democratic primary results
Party	Candidate	Votes	%
Democratic	Melanie Stansbury (incumbent)	47,157	100.0
Total votes		47,157	100.0

=== Republican primary ===
==== Nominee ====
- Steve Jones, retired energy executive and write-in candidate for the 2nd district in 2020

==== Eliminated in primary ====
- Louie Sanchez, gun range owner, candidate for this district in 2022, and candidate for U.S. Senate in 2020

==== Fundraising ====
Campaign finance reports as of May 15, 2024
Candidate	Raised	Spent	Cash on hand
Steve Jones (R)	$69,830 (Note: $69,830 of this total was self-funded by Jones)	$69,742	$98
Louie Sanchez (R)	$28,345 (Note: $28,070 of this total was self-funded by Sanchez)	$447	$27,897
Source: Federal Election Commission

==== Results ====
Results by county Jones: 50–60%; 60–70%; 70–80%; 80–90%; Sanchez: 50–60%; 70–80%

Republican primary results
Party	Candidate	Votes	%
Republican	Steve Jones	16,889	51.4
Republican	Louie Sanchez	15,980	48.6
Total votes		32,869	100.0

=== General election ===
==== Predictions ====
Source	Ranking	As of
Cook Political Report	Solid D	February 2, 2023
Inside Elections	Solid D	March 10, 2023
Sabato's Crystal Ball	Safe D	February 23, 2023
Elections Daily	Safe D	October 10, 2024
CNalysis	Solid D	November 16, 2023

==== Polling ====
Poll source	Date(s) administered	Sample size (Note: Key: A – all adults RV – registered voters LV – likely voters V – unclear)	Margin of error	Melanie Stansbury (D)	Steve Jones (R)	Undecided
Research & Polling Inc. (Note: Poll sponsored by The Albuquerque Journal)	October 10–18, 2024	360 (LV)	± 5.2%	53%	36%	11%
Emerson College (Note: Poll sponsored by The Hill)	August 20–22, 2024	344 (RV)	± 5.2%	51%	37%	12%

==== Results ====
2024 New Mexico's 1st congressional district election
Party	Candidate	Votes	%
Democratic	Melanie Stansbury (incumbent)	193,203	56.4
Republican	Steve Jones	149,546	43.6
Total votes		342,749	100.0
Democratic hold			

==== By county ====
County	Melanie Stansbury Democratic		Steve Jones Republican		Margin		Total votes cast
County	#	%	#	%	#	%	Total votes cast
Bernalillo (part)	142,885	61.48%	89,533	38.52%	53,352	22.96%	232,418
Chaves (part)	340	16.73%	1,692	83.27%	-1,352	-66.54%	2,032
De Baca	219	26.29%	614	73.71%	-395	-47.42%	833
Guadalupe	1,027	57.41%	762	42.59%	265	14.81%	1,789
Lincoln	3,071	31.06%	6,815	68.94%	-3,744	-37.87%	9,886
Otero (part)	179	64.39%	99	35.61%	80	28.78%	278
Sandoval (part)	35,556	51.27%	33,798	48.73%	1,758	2.53%	69,354
Santa Fe (part)	1,949	34.99%	3,621	65.01%	-1,672	-30.02%	5,570
Torrance	2,280	32.47%	4,741	67.53%	-2,461	-35.05%	7,021
Valencia (part)	5,697	41.99%	7,871	58.01%	-2,174	-16.02%	13,568
Totals	193,203	56.37%	149,546	43.63%	43,657	12.74%	342,749

== District 2 ==
2024 New Mexico's 2nd congressional district election
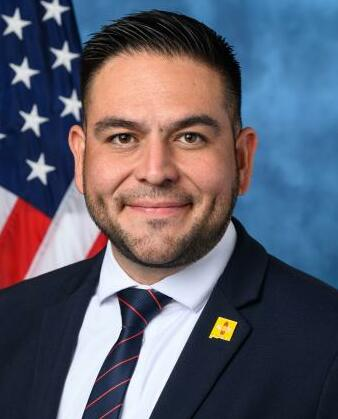

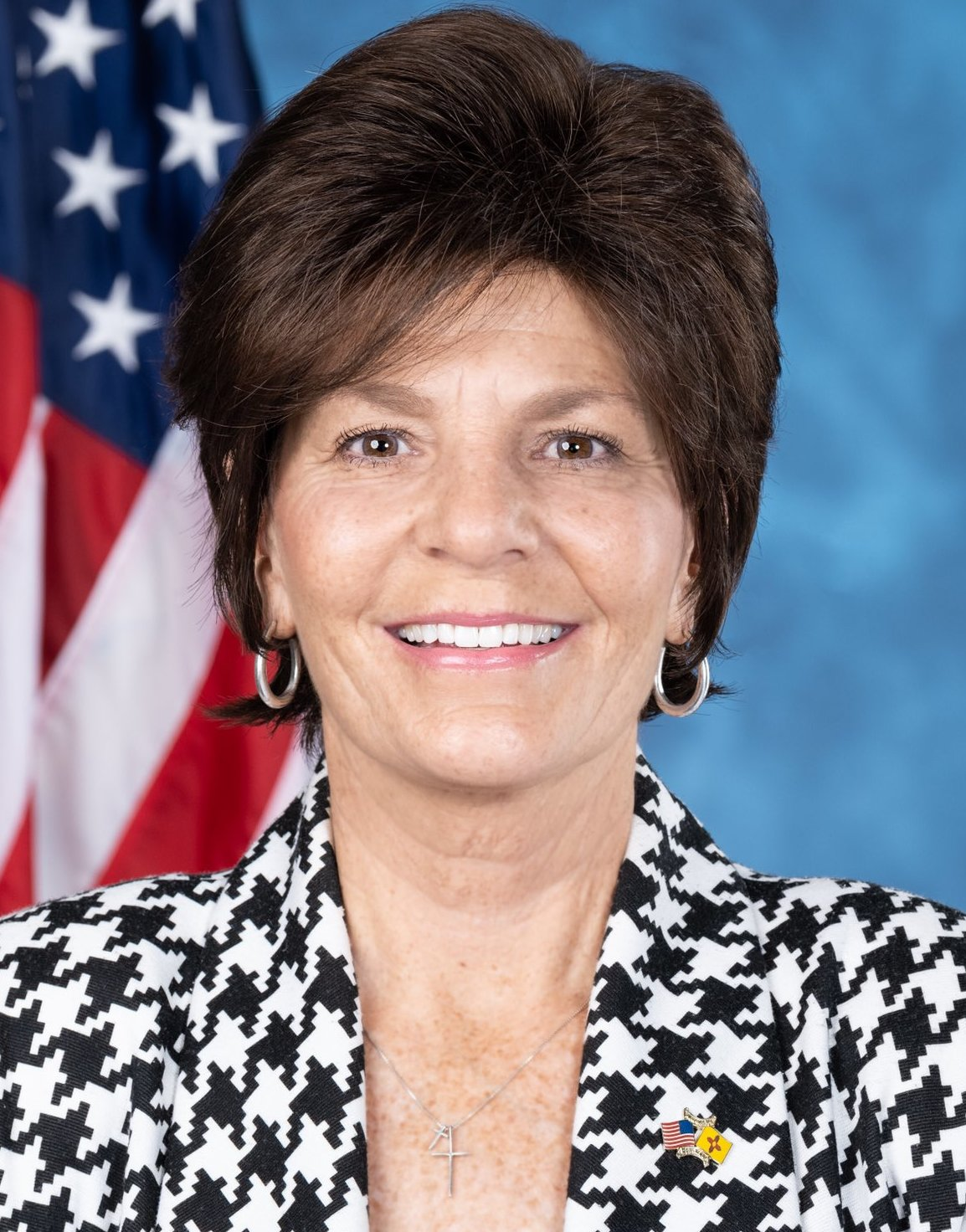
Nominee	Gabe Vasquez	Yvette Herrell
Party	Democratic	Republican
Popular vote	138,177	127,145
Percentage	52.1%	47.9%
- Vasquez: 50–60% 60–70% 70–80% 80–90% Herrell: 50–60% 60–70% 70–80% 80–90% >90% Tie: 50% No votes
U.S. Representative before election
Gabe Vasquez
Democratic
Elected U.S. Representative
Gabe Vasquez
Democratic

The 2nd district encapsulates southern and western New Mexico, including the cities of Las Cruces, Carlsbad, and Alamogordo, as well as the southwestern suburbs of Albuquerque. The incumbent was Democrat Gabe Vasquez, who flipped the district and was elected by a 0.7% margin in 2022 over then incumbent Yvette Herrell, who ran again for her former seat, but lost again to Vasquez, this time by a 4.2% margin.

=== Democratic primary ===
==== Nominee ====
- Gabe Vasquez, incumbent U.S. representative (2023–present)

==== Endorsements ====
Gabe Vasquez

Organizations

- Brady PAC
- Everytown for Gun Safety Action Fund
- Giffords
- Humane Society Legislative Fund
- J Street PAC
- Jewish Democratic Council of America
- League of Conservation Voters
- NARAL Pro-Choice America
- Natural Resources Defense Council
- Population Connection Action Fund

Labor unions

- AFSCME Council 18

==== Fundraising ====
Campaign finance reports as of May 15, 2024
Candidate	Raised	Spent	Cash on hand
Gabe Vasquez (D)	$3,042,711	$1,044,799	$2,020,688
Source: Federal Election Commission

==== Results ====
Democratic primary results
Party	Candidate	Votes	%
Democratic	Gabe Vasquez (incumbent)	29,613	100.0
Total votes		29,613	100.0

=== Republican primary ===
==== Nominee ====
- Yvette Herrell, former U.S. representative (2021–2023)

==== Endorsements ====
Yvette Herrell

U.S. executive branch officials

- John Bolton, United States National Security Advisor (2018–2019), United States Ambassador to the United Nations (2005–2006)
- Donald Trump, 45th president of the United States

U.S. representatives

- Mike Johnson, U.S. representative from LA-4 (2017–present) Speaker of the U.S. House of Representatives (2023–present)
- Kevin McCarthy, former U.S. representative from CA-20 (2007–2023) and former Speaker of the U.S. House of Representatives (2023)

Organizations

- Americans for Prosperity
- Congressional Leadership Fund
- Freedom Caucus
- Republican Jewish Coalition

==== Fundraising ====
Campaign finance reports as of May 15, 2024
Candidate	Raised	Spent	Cash on hand
Yvette Herell (R)	$1,862,963	$870,466	$1,099,602
Source: Federal Election Commission

==== Results ====
Republican primary results
Party	Candidate	Votes	%
Republican	Yvette Herrell	23,216	100.0
Total votes		23,216	100.0

=== General election ===
==== Predictions ====
Source	Ranking	As of
Cook Political Report	Tossup	February 2, 2023
Inside Elections	Lean D	October 31, 2024
Sabato's Crystal Ball	Lean D	February 23, 2023
Elections Daily	Lean D	September 7, 2023
CNalysis	Lean D	November 16, 2023

==== Polling ====
Poll source	Date(s) administered	Sample size	Margin of error	Gabe Vasquez (D)	Yvette Herrell (R)	Undecided
Research & Polling Inc.	October 10–18, 2024	414 (LV)	± 4.8%	49%	45%	5%
SurveyUSA (Note: Poll sponsored by KOB)	September 26–30, 2024	582 (LV)	± 4.5%	51%	42%	8%
Emerson College	August 20–22, 2024	283 (RV)	± 5.8%	50%	41%	9%
The Tarrance Group (R) (Note: Poll sponsored by Herrell's campaign)	July 11–14, 2024	400 (LV)	± 4.9%	46%	48%	6%
SurveyUSA	September 6–12, 2023	541 (LV)	± 4.8%	45%	46%	9%

==== Results ====
2024 New Mexico's 2nd congressional district election
Party	Candidate	Votes	%
Democratic	Gabe Vasquez (incumbent)	138,177	52.1
Republican	Yvette Herrell	127,145	47.9
Total votes		265,322	100.0
Democratic hold			

==== By county ====
County	Gabe Vasquez Democratic		Yvette Herrell Republican		Margin		Total votes cast
County	#	%	#	%	#	%	Total votes cast
Bernalillo (part)	40,528	59.36%	27,748	40.64%	12,780	18.72%	68,276
Catron	612	26.75%	1,676	73.25%	-1,064	-46.50%	2,288
Chaves (part)	4	4.71%	81	95.29%	-77	-90.59%	85
Cibola	4,883	55.77%	3,872	44.23%	1,011	11.55%	8,755
Doña Ana	48,358	57.76%	35,361	42.24%	12,997	15.52%	83,719
Eddy (part)	4,725	28.65%	11,767	71.35%	-7,042	-42.70%	16,492
Grant	7,771	55.62%	6,200	44.38%	1,571	11.24%	13,971
Hidalgo	776	42.92%	1,032	57.08%	-256	-14.16%	1,808
Lea (part)	1,134	25.42%	3,327	74.58%	-2,193	-49.16%	4,461
Luna	3,653	46.69%	4,171	53.31%	-518	-6.62%	7,824
McKinley (part)	1,876	77.33%	550	22.67%	1,326	54.66%	2,426
Otero (part)	8,988	38.52%	14,345	61.48%	-5,357	-22.96%	23,333
Sierra	2,456	42.16%	3,370	57.84%	-914	-15.69%	5,826
Socorro	3,693	52.10%	3,395	47.90%	298	4.20%	7,088
Valencia (part)	8,720	45.97%	10,250	54.03%	-1,530	-8.07%	18,970
Totals	138,177	52.08%	127,145	47.92%	11,032	4.16%	265,322

== District 3 ==
2024 New Mexico's 3rd congressional district election
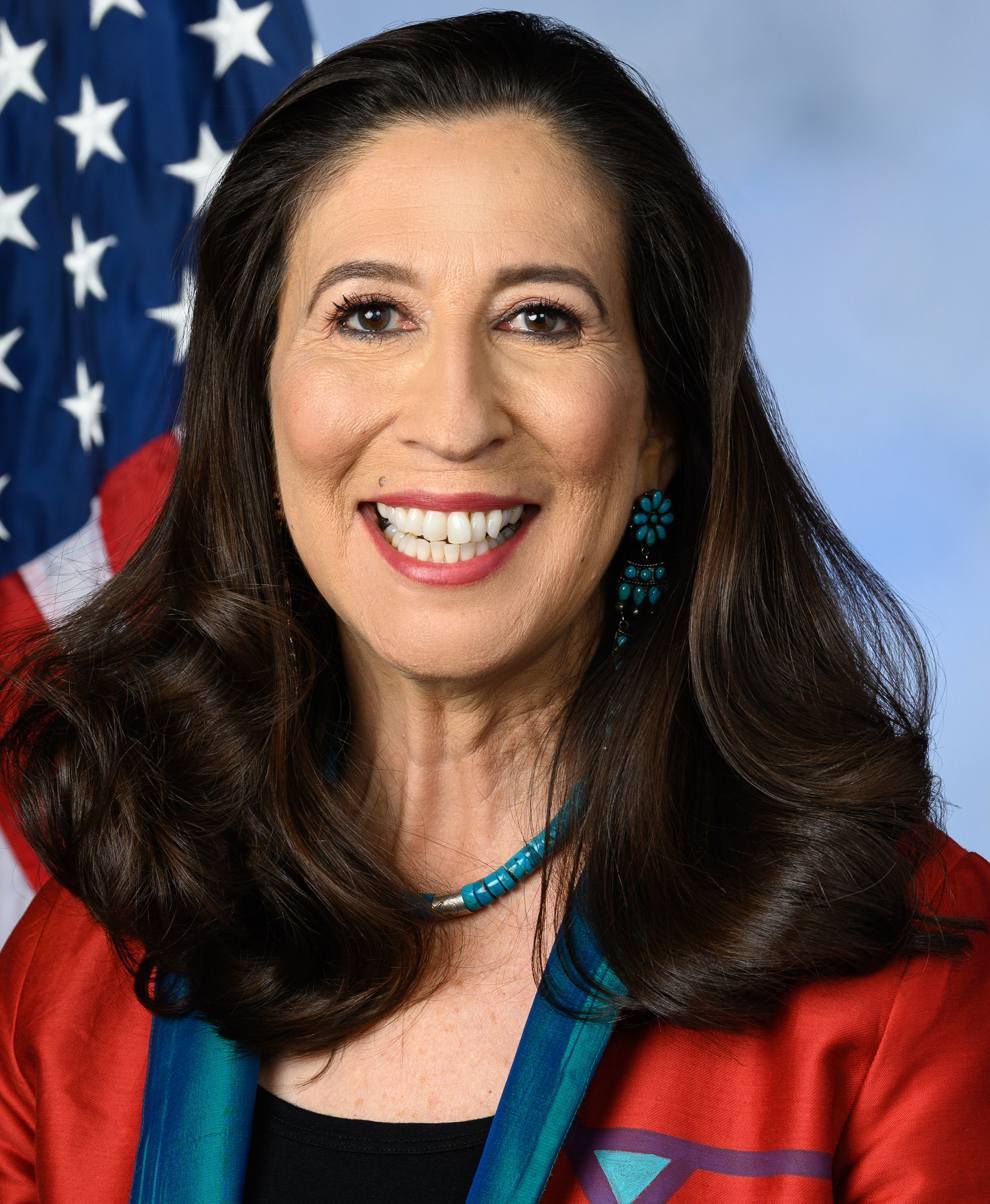

Nominee	Teresa Leger Fernández	Sharon Clahchischilliage
Party	Democratic	Republican
Popular vote	162,342	126,085
Percentage	56.3%	43.7%
- Leger Fernandez: 50–60% 60–70% 70–80% 80–90% >90% Clahchischilliage: 50–60% 60–70% 70–80% 80–90% >90% No votes
U.S. Representative before election
Teresa Leger Fernandez
Democratic
Elected U.S. Representative
Teresa Leger Fernandez
Democratic

The 3rd district covers the northern and eastern parts of the state, taking in the cities of Santa Fe, Roswell, Farmington, and Clovis, as well as parts of the Navajo Nation. The incumbent was Democrat Teresa Leger Fernandez, who was re-elected with 58.16% of the vote in 2022.

=== Democratic primary ===
==== Nominee ====
- Teresa Leger Fernandez, incumbent U.S. representative (2021–present)

==== Endorsements ====
Teresa Leger Fernandez

Organizations

- Council for a Livable World
- Democratic Majority for Israel
- Humane Society Legislative Fund
- J Street PAC
- Jewish Democratic Council of America
- League of Conservation Voters
- National Organization for Women
- National Women's Political Caucus
- Natural Resources Defense Council
- Planned Parenthood Action Fund
- Population Connection Action Fund

Labor unions

- AFSCME Council 18

==== Fundraising ====
Campaign finance reports as of May 15, 2024
Candidate	Raised	Spent	Cash on hand
Teresa Leger Fernandez (D)	$1,439,729	$657,117	$818,932
Source: Federal Election Commission

==== Results ====
Democratic primary results
Party	Candidate	Votes	%
Democratic	Teresa Leger Fernandez (incumbent)	46,008	100.0
Total votes		46,008	100.0

=== Republican primary ===
==== Nominee ====
- Sharon Clahchischilliage, member of the New Mexico Public Education Commission from the 5th district (2022–present) and former state representative from the 4th district (2013–2018)

==== Fundraising ====
Campaign finance reports as of May 15, 2024
Candidate	Raised	Spent	Cash on hand
Sharon Clahchischilliage (R)	$34,338	$25,495	$8,843
Source: Federal Election Commission

==== Results ====
Republican primary results
Party	Candidate	Votes	%
Republican	Sharon Clahchischilliage	24,959	100.0
Total votes		24,959	100.0

=== General election ===
==== Predictions ====
Source	Ranking	As of
Cook Political Report	Solid D	February 2, 2023
Inside Elections	Solid D	March 10, 2023
Sabato's Crystal Ball	Safe D	February 23, 2023
Elections Daily	Safe D	September 7, 2023
CNalysis	Solid D	November 16, 2023

==== Polling ====
Poll source	Date(s) administered	Sample size	Margin of error	Teresa Leger Fernandez (D)	Sharon Clahchischilliage (R)	Undecided
Research & Polling Inc.	October 10–18, 2024	344 (LV)	± 5.3%	52%	35%	11%
Emerson College	August 20–22, 2024	339 (RV)	± 5.3%	52%	39%	9%

==== Results ====
2024 New Mexico's 3rd congressional district election
Party	Candidate	Votes	%
Democratic	Teresa Leger Fernandez (incumbent)	162,342	56.3
Republican	Sharon Clahchischilliage	126,085	43.7
Total votes		288,427	100.0
Democratic hold			

==== By county ====
County	Teresa Leger Fernandez Democratic		Sharon Clahchischilliage Republican		Margin		Total votes cast
County	#	%	#	%	#	%	Total votes cast
Chaves (part)	6,449	33.61%	12,740	66.39%	-6,291	-32.78%	19,189
Colfax	2,860	50.26%	2,830	49.74%	30	0.53%	5,690
Curry	4,643	31.92%	9,904	68.08%	-5,261	-36.17%	14,547
Eddy (part)	1,207	18.97%	5,155	81.03%	-3,948	-62.06%	6,362
Harding	156	38.05%	254	61.95%	-98	-23.90%	410
Lea (part)	3,476	21.95%	12,357	78.05%	-8,881	-56.09%	15,833
Los Alamos	7,664	64.16%	4,282	35.84%	3,382	28.31%	11,946
McKinley (part)	14,671	65.07%	7,876	34.93%	6,795	30.14%	22,547
Mora	1,741	72.66%	655	27.34%	1,086	45.33%	2,396
Quay	1,223	34.75%	2,296	65.25%	-1,073	-30.49%	3,519
Rio Arriba	10,779	70.45%	4,521	29.55%	6,258	40.90%	15,300
Roosevelt	2,014	31.21%	4,440	68.79%	-2,426	-37.59%	6,454
San Juan	17,152	33.51%	34,040	66.49%	-16,888	-32.99%	51,192
San Miguel	8,015	74.13%	2,797	25.87%	5,218	48.26%	10,812
Sandoval (part)	5,803	70.36%	2,445	29.64%	3,358	40.71%	8,248
Santa Fe (part)	61,123	80.20%	15,086	19.80%	46,037	60.41%	76,209
Taos	12,902	79.72%	3,282	20.28%	9,620	59.44%	16,184
Union	464	29.20%	1,125	70.80%	-661	-41.60%	1,589
Totals	162,342	56.29%	126,085	43.71%	36,257	12.57%	288,427

== Notes ==
Partisan clients
