= Sarah Maestas Barnes =

American lawyer politician

Member of the New Mexico House of Representatives from the 15th district
- In office January 1, 2015 – January 1, 2019
- Preceded by: Emily Kane
- Succeeded by: Dayan Hochman-Vigil

Personal details
- Born: May 14, 1980 (age 46) Albuquerque, New Mexico, U.S.
- Party: Republican
- Education: University of New Mexico; University of New Mexico School of Law

Sarah Maestas Barnes (born May 14, 1980) is an American lawyer and politician who served in the New Mexico House of Representatives from the 15th district from 2015 to 2019. She opted not to run for re-election in 2018, and was succeeded by Democrat Dayan Hochman-Vigil.
