= Tim Lewis (politician) =

American politician

Timothy Lewis

Member of the New Mexico House of Representatives from the 60th district
- In office January 18, 2011 – January 19, 2021
- Preceded by: Jack Thomas
- Succeeded by: Joshua Hernandez

Personal details
- Party: Republican
- Education: Grand Canyon University
- Profession: Teacher
- Website: electtimlewis.com

Timothy "Tim" Dwight Lewis is an American politician who served as a member of the New Mexico House of Representatives from January 18, 2011 to January 19, 2021.

== Education ==
Lewis earned his MBA from Grand Canyon University.

== Elections ==
- 2012: Lewis was unopposed for both the June 5, 2012 Republican Primary, winning with 1,133 votes and the November 6, 2012 General election, winning with 8,319 votes.
- 2010: To challenge District 60 incumbent Democratic Representative Jack Thomas, Tonia Harris was unopposed for the June 1, 2010 Republican Primary; after Harris withdrew, Lewis was placed on the November 2, 2010 General election ballot, and won with 6,980 votes (60.9%) against Representative Thomas.
- In 2020, Lewis announced that he would not be a candidate for reelection.

== See also ==
- Politics of the United States
- List of political parties in the United States
