= James Smith (New Mexico politician) =

American politician

Member of the New Mexico House of Representatives from the 22nd district
- In office January 18, 2011 – 2018
- Preceded by: Kathy McCoy
- Succeeded by: Gregg Schmedes

Personal details
- Party: Republican

James E. Smith is an American politician who served as a member of the New Mexico House of Representatives for the 22nd district from January 18, 2011 to 2018.

Smith also worked as an educator for 18 years and taught science at East Mountain High School in Sandia Park from 2006 through 2014, when he retired.

== Elections ==
- 2012: Smith was unopposed for both the June 5, 2012 Republican Primary, winning with 2,163 votes and the November 6, 2012 General election, winning with 11,692 votes.
- 2008; To challenge District 22 incumbent Republican Representative Kathy McCoy, Smith ran in the three-way June 8, 2008 Republican Primary, but lost to Representative McCoy, who won re-election in the November 4, 2008 General election against her returning 2006 Democratic challenger Janice Saxton.
- 2010: When Representative McCoy left the Legislature and left the seat open, Smith ran in the June 1, 2010 Republican Primary and won with 1,927 votes (52.8%) and was unopposed for the November 2, 2010 General election, winning with 9,388 votes.
