= Kelly Fajardo =

American politician (born 1971)

Member of the New Mexico House of Representatives from the 7th district
- In office January 15, 2013 – January 1, 2023
- Preceded by: David Chavez
- Succeeded by: Tanya Mirabal Moya

Personal details
- Born: July 28, 1971 (age 54)
- Party: Republican
- Spouse: Larry Fajardo (div. 2017)
- Children: 3

Kelly K. Fajardo (born July 28, 1971) is an American politician who served as a Republican member of the New Mexico House of Representatives for the 7th district from 2013 to 2023.

== Elections ==
- 2012 with District 7 Republican state Representative David Chavez ran for New Mexico Senate and left the seat open, Fajardo was unopposed for the June 5, 2012, Republican primary, winning with 793 votes and won the November 6, 2012, general election with 4,522 votes (50.4%) against former Democratic Representative Andrew Barreras, who had lost the seat to David Chavez in 2010 after two terms.
