= Terry McMillan (politician) =

American politician in New Mexico

Member of the New Mexico House of Representatives from the 37th district
- In office January 18, 2011 – January 17, 2018
- Preceded by: Jeff Steinborn
- Succeeded by: Joanne Ferrary

Personal details
- Party: Republican
- Education: University of Texas Medical Branch (MD)

Terry H. McMillan is an American politician and surgeon who served as a member of the New Mexico House of Representatives for the 37th district from 2011 to 2017.

== Education ==
McMillan earned his MD at the University of Texas Medical Branch.

== Elections ==
- 2012 McMillan was unopposed for the June 5, 2012, Republican Primary after a challenger refiled to run for the open New Mexico Senate seat; McMillan won with 1,007 votes and won the November 6, 2012, General election by 8 votes with 6,267 votes (50.03%) against Democratic nominee Joanne Ferrary.
- 2010 To challenge District 37 incumbent Democratic Representative Jeff Steinborn, McMillan ran in the June 1, 2010, Republican Primary and won with 1,756 votes (81.1%) and won the November 2, 2010, General election with 6,110 votes (51.4%) against Representative Steinborn.
