= Jason Harper =

American politician

Member of the New Mexico House of Representatives from the 57th district
- In office January 15, 2013 – December 31, 2024
- Preceded by: Dennis Kintigh
- Succeeded by: Catherine Cullen

Personal details
- Party: Republican
- Education: New Mexico Institute of Mining and Technology (BS); Purdue University (MS); University of New Mexico (PhD)
- Website: harpernm.com

Jason Carl Harper is an American politician who was a member of the New Mexico House of Representatives from the 57th district. He assumed office on January 15, 2013.

== Education ==
Harper has a BS from New Mexico Institute of Mining and Technology, a master's degree from Purdue University and a PhD from the University of New Mexico all in chemical engineering.

== Elections ==
- 2012 With District 57 incumbent Republican Representative Dennis Kintigh redistricted to District 66, Harper was unopposed for the June 5, 2012 Republican Primary, winning with 740 votes and won the November 6, 2012 General election with 4,606 votes (53.2%) against Democratic nominee Donna Tillman.
