= Yvette Herrell =

American politician (born 1964)

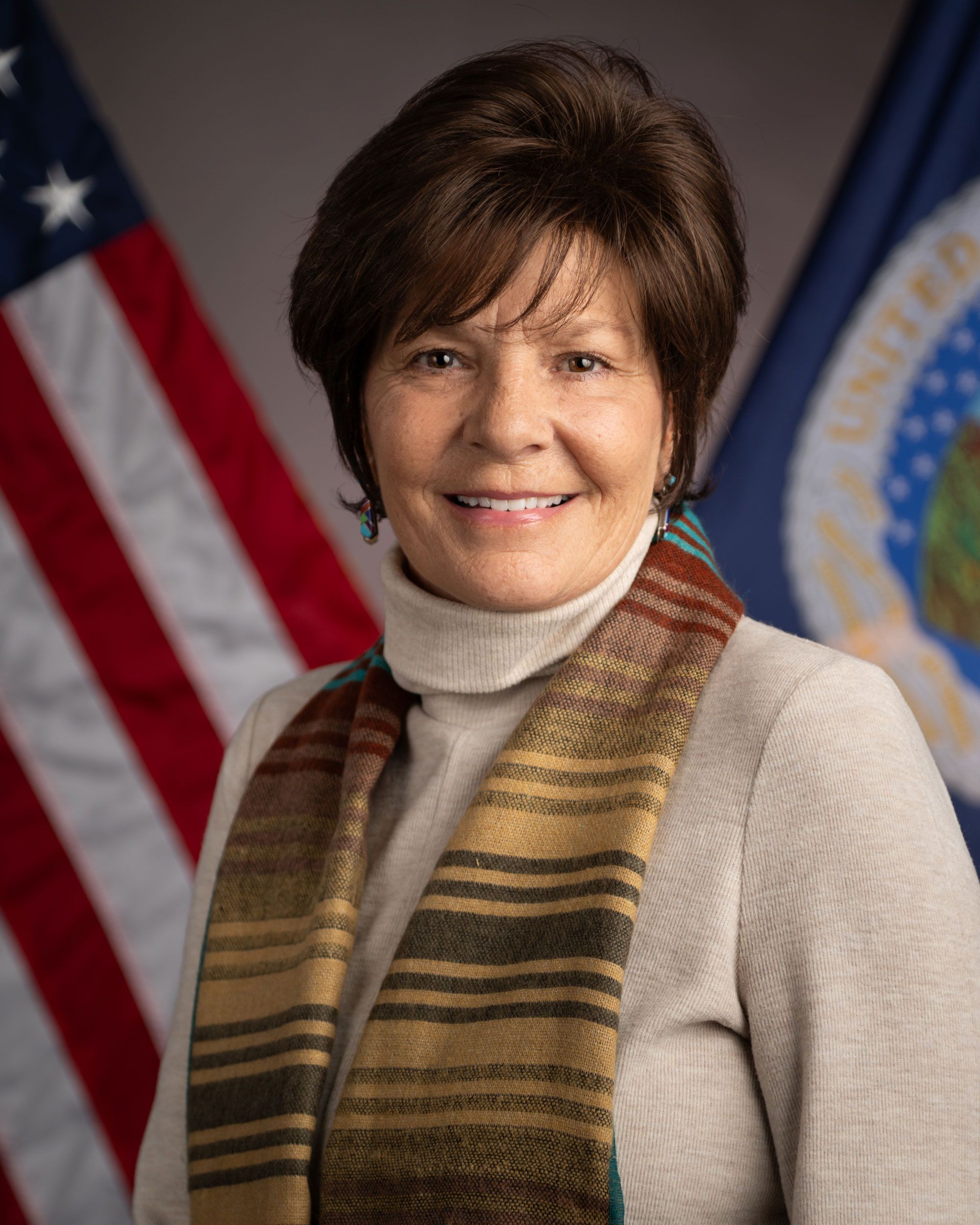
- Official portrait, 2025

Assistant Secretary of Agriculture for Congressional Relations
- Incumbent
- Assumed office December 19, 2025
- President: Donald Trump
- Preceded by: Adrienne Wojciechowski

Member of the U.S. House of Representatives from New Mexico's 2nd district
- In office January 3, 2021 – January 3, 2023
- Preceded by: Xochitl Torres Small
- Succeeded by: Gabe Vasquez

Member of the New Mexico House of Representatives from the 51st district
- In office January 18, 2011 – January 15, 2019
- Preceded by: Gloria Vaughn
- Succeeded by: Rachel Black

Personal details
- Born: Stella Yvette Herrell; March 16, 1964 (age 62) Ruidoso, New Mexico, U.S.
- Citizenship: American; Cherokee Nation
- Party: Republican
- Education: ITT Technical Institute; New Mexico State University
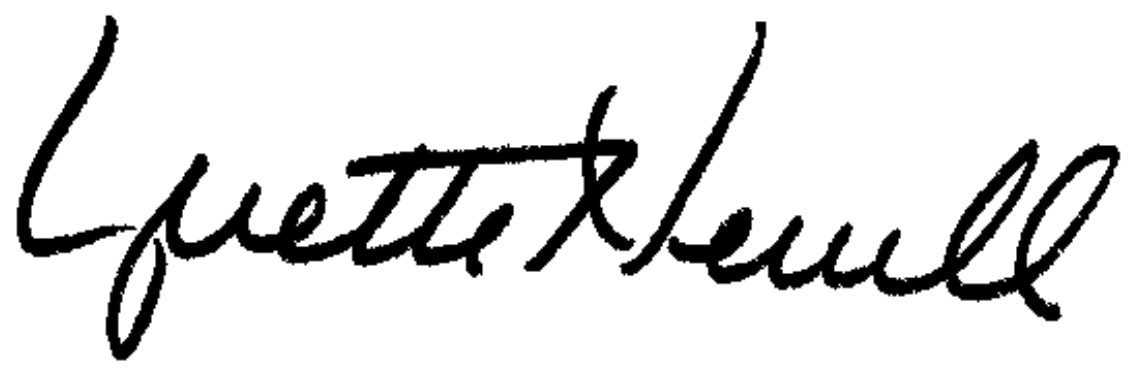
- Signature

Stella Yvette Herrell (/iˈvɛt ˈhɛrəl/ ee-VETT HERR-əl; born March 16, 1964) is an American politician and realtor who served as the U.S. representative for New Mexico's 2nd congressional district from 2021 to 2023. A member of the Republican Party, she served four terms as a member of the New Mexico House of Representatives for the 51st district from 2011 to 2019.

Herrell was the Republican nominee for New Mexico's 2nd congressional district in 2018, narrowly losing to Democrat Xochitl Torres Small. She was the Republican nominee for the 2nd district again in 2020, and defeated Torres Small in a rematch. She narrowly lost her bid for reelection in 2022 to Democratic nominee Gabe Vasquez, a former Las Cruces city councillor. In 2024, Herrell ran again for the seat, but lost again to Vasquez, losing 52% to 48%.

Herrell has marked many firsts: she is the first Republican Native woman elected to Congress, the first Cherokee woman, the third Native American woman, and the second Native woman from New Mexico elected to the House. She was the only Republican member of New Mexico's congressional delegation during the 117th Congress and the last Republican U.S Representative from the state.

In June 2025, Herrell was nominated by Donald Trump to be Assistant Secretary of Agriculture for Congressional Relations.

== Early life and education ==
Herrell was born in Ruidoso, New Mexico, and is a citizen of the Cherokee Nation. After attending Cloudcroft High School, she earned a legal secretary diploma from ITT Technical Institute, a failed and federally sanctioned for-profit education chain that permanently went out of business in 2016, in Boise, Idaho.

After graduating from ITT, Herrell returned to New Mexico, where she attended New Mexico State University without finishing her bachelor's and worked as a realtor in Alamogordo. She later worked as a real estate broker for Future Real Estate in Alamogordo.

== New Mexico House of Representatives ==
In 2010, Herrell challenged incumbent District 51 Republican state Representative Gloria Vaughn in the June 1 Republican primary. Herrell won with 846 votes (54.2%), and went on to win the November 2 general election with 3,077 votes (62.9%) against Democratic nominee Susan Medina.

In 2012, Herrell was unopposed in both the June 5 Republican primary, which she won with 2,128 votes, and the November 6 general election, which she won with 7,750 votes.

== United States Representative ==
=== Elections ===
==== 2018 ====
In 2018, Herrell was a candidate for the United States House of Representatives, and was defeated in a close race by political newcomer and Democratic attorney Xochitl Torres Small. The results were close on election night, with Herrell in the lead at the end of the night and some New Mexico media organizations projecting that she would win. The next day, more ballots were counted, narrowing Herrell's lead, and media organizations rescinded their initial projections. Absentee ballots made Torres Small the winner 51% to 49%. Without offering evidence, Herrell alleged possible election fraud before conceding the race.

A 2018 Associated Press review of Herrell's campaign finance disclosure records found that she had failed to disclose that her real estate company earned $440,000 in contracts with two state agencies over five years. Herrell said she had submitted all required paperwork and that the allegations against her represented "an attack on my moral character" orchestrated by one of her opponents in the Republican congressional primary.

==== 2020 ====
Herrell was a candidate for the 2nd congressional district in the 2020 elections. In the Republican primary, she faced businesswoman Claire Chase and businessman Chris Mathys. Herrell won the primary with 45.6% of the vote and faced Torres Small in the November general election.

Herrell won the November general election 54% to 46% and took office on January 3, 2021. She campaigned on a stronger southern U.S. border, supporting small businesses, and fighting overly tight government regulation.

==== 2022 ====
Herrell was a candidate for re-election in the 2022 elections. She ran unopposed in the Republican primary and faced Democratic nominee Gabe Vasquez in the general election.

Vasquez won the November general election by less than 1%.

==== 2024 ====
In 2024, Herrell ran again for the seat, but lost again to Vasquez this time 52% to 48%.

=== Tenure ===
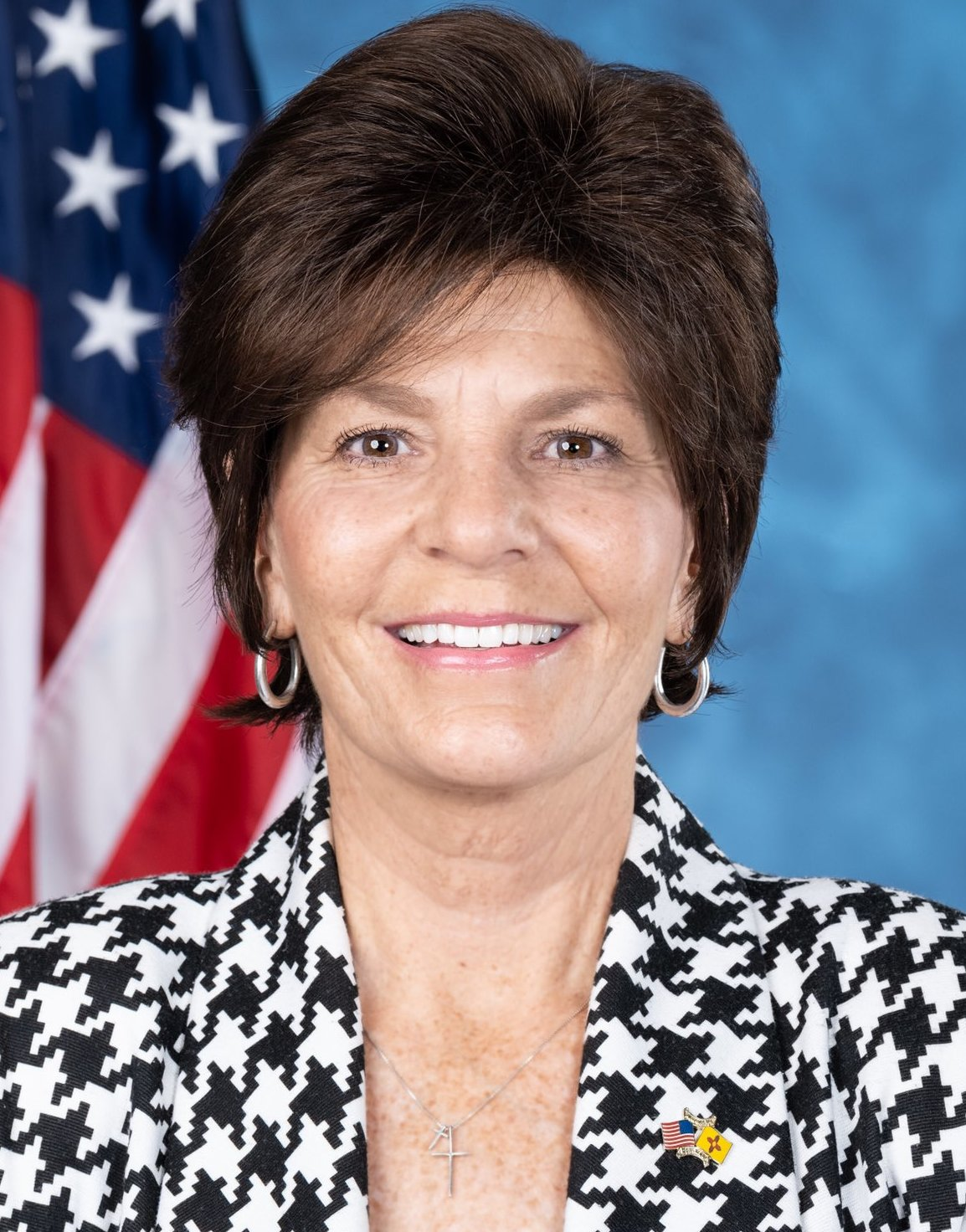
Official congressional portrait, 2020

==== Defense ====
In June 2021, Herrell was one of 49 House Republicans to vote to repeal the AUMF against Iraq.

In September 2021, Herrell was among 75 House Republicans to vote against the National Defense Authorization Act of 2022, which contains a provision that would require women to be drafted.

==== Immigration ====
In 2021, Herrell called for the National Guard to be deployed at the United States-Mexico border.

In 2022, Herrell was the main sponsor of a bill to give Canadian truckers protesting vaccine mandates temporary political asylum.

=== Committee assignments ===
- Committee on Natural Resources
  - Subcommittee on Energy and Mineral Resources
  - Subcommittee on National Parks, Forests and Public Lands
- Committee on Oversight and Reform
  - Subcommittee on Environment
  - Subcommittee on Government Operations

=== Caucus memberships ===
- Freedom Caucus
- Republican Study Committee

== Post-congressional career ==
=== 2024 U.S. House campaign ===
In 2024, Herrell ran for her old congressional seat, but lost again to Gabe Vasquez, winning 48% of the vote to Vasquez's 52%.

=== Assistant Secretary of Agriculture for Congressional Relations ===
In June 2025, Herrell was nominated by President Donald Trump to be Assistant Secretary of Agriculture for Congressional Relations.

== Electoral history ==
=== 2018 ===
New Mexico's 2nd congressional district election, 2018
Party	Candidate	Votes	%
Democratic	Xochitl Torres Small	100,570	50.9
Republican	Yvette Herrell	97,031	49.1
Total votes		197,601	100.0
Democratic gain from Republican			

=== 2020 ===
New Mexico's 2nd congressional district election, 2020
Party	Candidate	Votes	%
Republican	Yvette Herrell	142,169	53.75
Democratic	Xochitl Torres Small (incumbent)	122,314	46.25
Total votes		264,483	100.0
Republican gain from Democratic			

=== 2022 ===
2022 New Mexico's 2nd congressional district election
Party	Candidate	Votes	%
Democratic	Gabe Vasquez	96,986	50.3
Republican	Yvette Herrell (incumbent)	95,636	49.6
Write-in		51	0.3
Total votes		192,673	100.0
Democratic gain from Republican			

=== 2024 ===
2024 New Mexico's 2nd congressional district election
Party	Candidate	Votes	%
Democratic	Gabe Vasquez (incumbent)	138,177	52.1
Republican	Yvette Herrell	127,145	47.9
Total votes		265,322	100.0
Democratic hold			

== Political positions ==
During her campaign for the 2nd district in 2020, Herrell was endorsed by President Donald Trump. After Joe Biden won the 2020 presidential election and Trump refused to concede while making baseless claims of fraud, Herrell objected to the certification of Arizona's and Pennsylvania's electoral votes in Congress.

Herrell supports repealing the Affordable Care Act. She has argued that health insurance should be left to "free markets".

In a 2020 interview with the Albuquerque Journal, she said, "DACA needs to be reformed." She also said she "will not support any legislation that will impede on our Second Amendment" and supports allowing concealed carry on school property.

Herrell opposes abortion. She supported the 2022 Supreme Court decision that overturned Roe v. Wade. She co-sponsored the Life at Conception Act in 2021, which defined "human being" as "all stages of life, including the moment of fertilization" and made no exceptions for in vitro fertilization (IVF). In 2020, she said "I wish we could have eliminated all abortion in the state." While a member of the New Mexico House of Representatives in 2015, Herrell sponsored a bill that banned late-term abortion with exceptions for instances of sexual abuse, rape, or incest. In 2024, Herrell said she opposed a national abortion ban and believes abortion laws should be left to the states. She said "I have always and will continue to fully support protecting access to fertility treatments like IVF."

She has said that the federal government's role in public education should be limited.

Herrell has said that she supports legislation that improves water rights, private property rights, and the management of public lands.

After Trump supporters stormed the U.S. Capitol on January 6, 2021, Herrell voted not to impeach Trump.

In 2021, Herrell voted against the American Rescue Plan that was passed by Congress and signed into law by Biden.

On February 25, 2021, Herrell voted against the Equality Act, a bill that would prohibit discrimination based on gender identity and sexual orientation by amending the Civil Rights Act of 1964 and the Fair Housing Act to include new protections.

During the COVID-19 pandemic, Herrell attended events that did not comply with public health measures to hinder the spread of the virus, such as social distancing and face masks. Explaining why she did not wear a face mask while in a public gathering, Herrell said, "I was at an event, yes; no one in the audience was wearing a mask, so I didn't feel as though I needed to wear one in that particular setting." She criticized the virus mitigation strategies implemented by Democrats in New Mexico.

== Personal life ==
Herrell is a Protestant.

== See also ==
- List of Native Americans in the United States Congress
- Native American women in politics
- Women in conservatism in the United States
- Women in the United States House of Representatives

U.S. House of Representatives
Preceded by Xochitl Torres Small	Member of the U.S. House of Representatives from New Mexico's 2nd congressional district 2021–2023	Succeeded by Gabe Vasquez
U.S. order of precedence (ceremonial)
Preceded by Xochitl Torres Small as Former U.S. Representative	Order of precedence of the United States as Former U.S. Representative	Succeeded by Sam Coppersmith as Former U.S. Representative
