= Carl Trujillo =

American politician

Member of the New Mexico House of Representatives from the 46th district
- In office 2013–2019
- Preceded by: Ben Lujan
- Succeeded by: Andrea Romero

Personal details
- Party: Democratic

Carl Trujillo is an American politician who served as member of the New Mexico House of Representatives from 2013 to 2019.

== Career ==
Trujillo defeated Santa Fe Mayor David Coss in the Democratic primary for the seat. Coss had been endorsed by Trujillo's house predecessor, Ben Lujan.

Trujillo was defeated in the June 5, 2018 primary election by the eventual general election winner, Andrea Romero. Trujillo's term ended in January 2019.
