= Bob Wooley =

American politician (born 1947)

Member of the New Mexico House of Representatives from the 66th district
- In office January 14, 2011 – January 15, 2019
- Preceded by: Keith Gardner
- Succeeded by: Phelps Anderson

Personal details
- Born: February 1947 (age 79) Eunice, New Mexico, U.S.
- Party: Republican
- Education: New Mexico State University (BS)

Military service
- Branch/service: United States Army
- Years of service: 1968–1969

Bob Wooley (born February 1947) is an American politician who served as a member of the New Mexico House of Representatives from January 14, 2011 to January 15, 2019.

== Education ==
Wooley was born in Eunice, New Mexico. He earned a Bachelor of Science degree in agricultural business from New Mexico State University.

== Career ==
Wooley was appointed to the New Mexico House of Representatives by then-Governor Susana Martinez to fill the vacancy left by the resignation of Keith Gardner. In 2012, Wooley faced fellow Republican Representative Dennis Kintigh, who had been redistricted from District 57, in the June 5, 2012 Republican Primary. Wooley won with 1,600 votes (55.5%) and was unopposed for the November 6, 2012 General election, winning with 8,079 votes.

In 2018, he announced that he would not seek re-election.
