= Emily Kane =

American politician

Member of the New Mexico House of Representatives from the 15th district
- In office January 15, 2013 – January 2015
- Preceded by: Bill O'Neill
- Succeeded by: Sarah Maestas Barnes

Personal details
- Born: May 14, 1956 (age 70) Eugene, Oregon, U.S.
- Party: Democratic
- Profession: Fire Chief
- Website: emilykane4nm.com

Emily A. Kane (born May 14, 1956) is an American politician who served as a member of the New Mexico House of Representatives representing District 15 from January 15, 2013, through January 2015.

== Early life ==
Kane was born on May 14, 1956, in Eugene, Oregon. She attended the Emergency Medical Services Academy at the University of New Mexico.

== Career ==
With District 15 incumbent Democratic Representative Bill O'Neill running for New Mexico Senate, Kane ran in the three-way June 5, 2012, Democratic Primary, winning with 962 votes (44.5%) and won the November 6, 2012, General election with 6,850 votes (51.2%) against Republican nominee Christopher Saucedo.

Kane sought a second term but was defeated for re-election by attorney Sarah Maestas Barnes, who won with 7,358 votes (53.2%) to 6,467 (46.8%) for Kane. The New Mexico Supreme Court later ruled that city Albuquerque city government employees, including police and fire, would be barred from holding public office concurrently.
