= Tomás Salazar =

American politician

Member of the New Mexico House of Representatives from the 70th district
- In office January 15, 2013 – December 31, 2020
- Preceded by: Richard Vigil
- Succeeded by: Ambrose Castellano

Personal details
- Born: October 27, 1943 (age 82) San Miguel County, New Mexico, U.S.
- Party: Democratic
- Education: New Mexico Highlands University (BS); University of Montana (MA); University of New Mexico (PhD)

Tomás E. Salazar (born October 2, 1943) is an American politician who served as a member of the New Mexico House of Representatives from January 15, 2013 to December 30, 2020.

== Education ==
Salazar earned a Bachelor of Science degree in mathematics from New Mexico Highlands University, his Master of Arts in the mathematics from the University of Montana, and his PhD in mathematics from the University of New Mexico.

== Elections ==
- 2012 Salazar challenged District 70 incumbent Democratic Representative Richard Vigil in the June 5, 2012 Democratic Primary, winning with 2,526 votes (55.3%) against Representative Vigil, and was unopposed for the November 6, 2012 General election, winning with 8,441 votes.

== See also ==
- Politics of the United States
- List of political parties of the United States
