= Dona Irwin =

American politician (1932–2024)

Member of the New Mexico House of Representatives from the 32nd district
- In office January 1999 – January 1, 2017
- Preceded by: G. X. McSherry
- Succeeded by: Candie Sweetser

Personal details
- Born: Dona Gale Ball; September 13, 1932 Silver City, New Mexico, U.S.
- Died: October 10, 2024 (aged 92) Deming, New Mexico, U.S.
- Party: Democratic
- Spouse: Claude Bertram Irwin (m. 1951, died)

Dona Gale Irwin (née Ball; September 13, 1932 – October 10, 2024) was an American politician and a Democratic member of the New Mexico House of Representatives representing District 32 since January 1999.

== Elections ==
In 1998, Democratic Representative G. X. McSherry left the Legislature and the seat for District 32 open. Irwin ran unopposed in the June 2, 1998, Democratic Primary and won the November 3, 1998, General election with 2,628 votes (61.3%) against Republican nominee Rick Montoya.

Irwin ran unopposed in the 2000 Democratic Primary, winning with 528 votes and won the November 7, 2000, General election with 3,082 votes (65.1%) against Republican nominee Mary Kay Reese.

Irwin ran unopposed in both the 2002 Democratic Primary, winning with 2,283 votes and the November 5, 2002, General election, winning with 4,349 votes.

Irwin ran unopposed in the June 1, 2004, Democratic Primary, winning with 1,056 votes and won the November 2, 2004, General election with 4,063 votes (54.4%) against Republican nominee Ida Kay Chandler.

Irwin and her 2004 Republican challenger Chandler were both unopposed for their June 6, 2006, primaries, setting up a rematch; Irwin won the November 7, 2006, General election with 3,733 votes (61.6%) against Chandler.

Irwin ran unopposed in the June 8, 2008, Democratic Primary, winning with 1,547 votes and won the November 4, 2008, General election with 5,325 votes (74.5%) against Republican nominee Phillip Skinner.

Irwin ran unopposed in the June 1, 2010, Democratic Primary, winning with 1,313 votes and won the November 2, 2010, General election with 3,464 votes (56.9%) against Republican nominee Thomas Walker.

Irwin was challenged in the June 5, 2012, Democratic Primary, winning with 1,309 votes (54.5%) and won the November 6, 2012, General election with 5,688 votes (63.8%) against Republican nominee Thomas Guerra.

== Death ==
Irwin died on October 10, 2024, at the age of 92.
