= Paul Pacheco =

American politician

Member of the New Mexico House of Representatives from the 23rd district
- In office January 15, 2013 – December 31, 2016
- Preceded by: David Doyle
- Succeeded by: Daymon Ely

Personal details
- Party: Republican
- Profession: Police officer

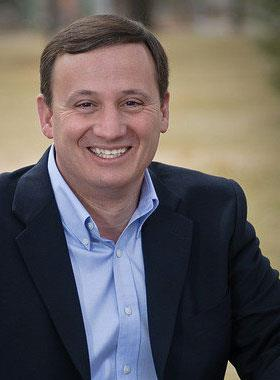

Paul A. Pacheco is an American politician and a former Republican member of the New Mexico House of Representatives representing District 23 from 2013 to 2016.

== Education ==
Pacheco graduated from the police academy in 1984.

== Elections ==
- 2012 With District 23 incumbent Republican Representative David Doyle running for New Mexico Senate, Pacheco was unopposed in the June 5, 2012 Republican Primary, winning with 1,242 votes and won the November 6, 2012 General election by 78 votes with 6,922 votes (50.3%) against Democratic nominee Marci Blaze.
- 2010 To challenge District 23 incumbent Democratic Representative Benjamin Rodefer, Pacheco ran in the three-way June 1, 2010 Republican Primary, but lost to David Doyle, who went on to win the November 2, 2010 General election against Representative Rodefer.
