= Donald Bratton =

American politician (born 1947)

Member of the New Mexico House of Representatives from the 62nd district
- In office January 2001 – January 2015
- Preceded by: Steve Pearce
- Succeeded by: Larry R. Scott

Personal details
- Born: June 7, 1947 (age 79) Monahans, Texas, U.S.
- Party: Republican
- Education: New Mexico State University

Military service
- Branch/service: United States Air Force
- Years of service: 1971–1975
- Rank: First lieutenant

Donald Everett Bratton (born June 7, 1947, in Monahans, Texas) is an American politician who served as a member of the New Mexico House of Representatives for District 62 from January 2001 through 2015. He did not seek re-election in 2014.

Bratton was the mayor of Hobbs from 1996 until 1998.

== Education ==
Bratton earned his BS in industrial engineering (BSIE) from New Mexico State University.

== Elections ==
- 2012 Bratton was unopposed for both the June 5, 2012 Republican Primary, winning with 1,621 votes and the November 6, 2012 General election, winning with 7,722 votes.
- 2000 When District 62 incumbent Republican Representative Steve Pearce ran for United States Senate and left the seat open, Bratton was unopposed for the 2000 Republican Primary, winning with 1,075 votes and won the November 7, 2000 General election with 4,765 votes (65.9%) against Democratic nominee Gary Buie.
- 2002 Bratton was unopposed for both the 2002 Republican Primary, winning with 2,391 votes and the November 5, 2002 General election, winning with 5,950 votes.
- 2004 Bratton was unopposed for both the June 1, 2004 Republican Primary, winning with 1,604 votes and the November 2, 2004 General election, winning with 8,795 votes.
- 2006 Bratton was unopposed for both the June 6, 2006 Republican Primary, winning with 1,733 votes and the November 7, 2006 General election, winning with 5,571 votes.
- 2008 Bratton was unopposed for both the June 8, 2008 Republican Primary, winning with 2,384 votes and the November 4, 2008 General election, winning with 8,402 votes.
- 2010 Bratton was unopposed for both the June 1, 2010 Republican Primary, winning with 2,520 votes and the November 2, 2010 General election, winning with 6,583 votes.
