= Phillip Archuleta =

American politician

Phillip M. Archuleta

Member of the New Mexico House of Representatives from the 36th district
- In office 2013–2014
- Preceded by: Andy Nuñez

Personal details
- Born: May 12, 1949 Taos, New Mexico, U.S.
- Died: December 16, 2014 (aged 65) Las Cruces, New Mexico, U.S.
- Party: Democratic
- Spouse: Diana
- Education: Northern New Mexico College

Phillip M. "Felipe" Archuleta (May 12, 1949 – December 16, 2014) was an American politician.

== Political career ==
Archuleta was a Democratic member of the New Mexico House of Representatives, serving from 2013 until his death on December 16, 2014, in Las Cruces, New Mexico. Archuleta defeated his predecessor, then-independent Andy Nuñez, as well as a Republican candidate in 2012 to win the seat in a three-way race.

== Background ==
Archuleta was born in Taos, New Mexico. He lived in Bayard, New Mexico and went to Northern New Mexico College and the National Judicial College. He worked for the New Mexico Transportation Department and then the New Mexico Labor Department. He died of pneumonia in 2014 after a period of declining health, aged 65.
