= Dennis Roch =

Member of the New Mexico House of Representatives

Member of the New Mexico House of Representatives from the 67th district
- In office January 2009 – January 15, 2019
- Preceded by: Brian Moore
- Succeeded by: Jack Chatfield

Personal details
- Born: November 6, 1973 (age 52) Fort Dix, New Jersey, U.S.
- Party: Republican
- Education: Eastern New Mexico University; George Mason University
- Profession: Superintendent
- Website: dennisroch.com

Dennis J. Roch (born November 6, 1973) is an American politician who served as a member of the New Mexico House of Representatives from January 2009 to January 2019, representing District 67.

== Education ==
Roch earned his BA in English from Eastern New Mexico University and his MA in English from George Mason University.

== Elections ==
- 2012 Roch was unopposed for both the June 5, 2012, Republican Primary, winning with 2,061 votes and the November 6, 2012, General election, winning with 8,492 votes.
- 2008 When District 67 Representative Brian Moore left the Legislature, Roch was unopposed for the June 8, 2008, Republican Primary, winning with 1,465 votes and won the November 4, 2008, General election with 5,496 votes (55.2%) against Democratic nominee Craig Cosner.
- 2010 Roch was unopposed for both the June 1, 2010, Republican Primary, winning with 1,769 votes and the November 2, 2010, General election, winning with 5,862 votes.
