= Andy Nuñez =

American politician (born 1935)

Member of the New Mexico House of Representatives for the 36th district
- In office 2001 – 2013 & 2015 - 2017
- Preceded by: Phillip Archuleta
- Succeeded by: Nathan Small

Personal details
- Born: November 30, 1935 (age 90) Roswell, New Mexico, U.S.
- Party: Republican (2014-present) Independent (2011-2014) Democratic (before 2011)
- Spouse: Carolyn

Andrew Nuñez (born November 30, 1935) is an American Politician who was a former Republican member of the New Mexico House of Representatives. A farmer, Nuñez attended New Mexico State University and received a Bachelor of Science and masters of science degree in animal science.

Nuñez was a Democratic member of the House of Representatives from 2001 until he switched his affiliation to Independent in 2011 and lost reelection the following year in a three-candidate race to Phillipp Archuleta. Nuñez ran as a Republican in 2014 and was returned to the New Mexico House of Representatives as the New Mexico Republican Party gained a legislative majority in the state house for the first time since 1952. Nuñez was defeated for reelection in 2016 by former Las Cruces City Councilor Nathan P. Small.
