= Stephen Easley =

American politician

Representative Stephen Easley

Member of the New Mexico House of Representatives from the 50th district
- In office January 2013 – August 14, 2013
- Preceded by: Rhonda King
- Succeeded by: Vickie Perea

Personal details
- Born: September 4, 1952 Indiana, United States
- Died: August 14, 2013 (aged 60) Santa Fe, New Mexico
- Party: Democratic
- Children: 2
- Education: Purdue University; Washington University in St. Louis
- Occupation: Businessman

Stephen Easley (September 4, 1952 – August 14, 2013) was an American businessman and politician.

== Education and early life ==
Easley was born in Indiana to Jack and Alice Easley. Easley received his bachelor's degree from Purdue University. He later earned a master's degree and then a doctorate degree in biological anthropology from Washington University in St. Louis. He married Susan on August 24, 1974, and they had two children.

== Career ==
Easley owned an informational consulting business in Santa Fe, New Mexico, named Easley & Associates, an IT company. He also worked in the New Mexico state government in various positions, including as deputy chief information security officer for the state and as chief information officer for New Mexico's departments of Homeland Security, Workforce Training and Development and Public Safety.

From 2000 to 2003, Easley served as city commissioner in Alamogordo, New Mexico. In 2012, he defeated Republican Charles Miller and was elected to the New Mexico House of Representatives to represent district 50. He was serving his first term in 2013 at the time of his death from an infection.
