= George Dodge =

American politician

Member of the New Mexico House of Representatives from the 63rd district
- In office January 18, 2011 – January 19, 2019
- Preceded by: Jose Campos
- Succeeded by: Martin Ruben Zamora

Personal details
- Party: Democratic
- Education: New Mexico Highlands University

George Dodge, Jr. was an American politician and a Democratic member of the New Mexico House of Representatives representing District 63 from January 2011 to January 2019.

== Education ==
Dodge earned his bachelor's degree in history and political science and his master's degree in education administration from New Mexico Highlands University.

== Elections ==
- 2012 Dodge was challenged by his 2010 primary opponent in the June 5, 2012 Democratic Primary; Dodge won with 1,544 votes (79.7%) and won the November 6, 2012 General election with 4,881 votes (63.5%) against Republican nominee Steven Hanson.
- 2010 When District 63 Democratic Representative Jose Campos ran for Lieutenant Governor of New Mexico, Dodge won the June 1, 2010 Democratic Primary with 1,450 votes (78%) and won the November 2, 2010 General election with 2,638 votes (54.5%) against Republican nominee Melinda Russ.
