= Brian Egolf =

American politician (born 1976)

- Egolf in 20212

30th Speaker of the New Mexico House of Representatives
- In office January 17, 2017 – January 17, 2023
- Preceded by: Don Tripp
- Succeeded by: Javier Martínez

Member of the New Mexico House of Representatives from the 47th district
- In office January 2009 – January 17, 2023
- Preceded by: Peter Wirth
- Succeeded by: Reena Szczepanski

Personal details
- Born: September 10, 1976 (age 50) Oklahoma City, Oklahoma, U.S.
- Party: Democratic
- Education: Georgetown University (BS); University of New Mexico (JD)
- Website: Campaign website

Brian Egolf (born September 10, 1976) is an American attorney and politician who served as a member of the New Mexico House of Representatives. He has also served as the speaker of the House between 2017 and 2023.

== Early life and education ==
Egolf was born in Oklahoma City and raised in Santa Fe, New Mexico. He earned a Bachelor of Science degree from Georgetown University and a Juris Doctor from the University of New Mexico School of Law.

== Career ==
In the 2017 legislative session, Egolf served on the Judiciary, Rules and Order of Business, and Taxation & Revenue Committees.

Egolf championed equal pay for equal work for the women of New Mexico, reduced government corruption through the creation of the New Mexico State Ethics Commission, and passed legislation to penalize the distribution of sensitive images, such as child pornography. As a private practice attorney, Egolf filed suit in New Mexico district court on behalf of a gay couple that was denied a marriage license.

Egolf was considered a potential congressional candidate for the United States House of Representatives in the 2014 election against incumbent Republican Steve Pearce.

== Personal life ==
Egolf resides in Santa Fe, New Mexico with his family.

Political offices
Preceded by Don Tripp	Speaker of the New Mexico House of Representatives; 2017–2023	Succeeded by Javier Martínez
