= 2016 New Mexico House of Representatives election =

- November 8, 2016

All 70 seats in the New Mexico House of Representatives 36 seats needed for a majority

| | Majority party | Minority party |
|---|---|---|
| Leader | Brian Egolf | Don Tripp |
| Party | Democratic | Republican |
| Leader's seat | 47th - Santa Fe | 49th - Socorro |
| Last election | 33 | 37 |
| Seats won | 38 | 32 |
| Seat change | ▲5 | ▼5 |
| Popular vote | 365,713 | 304,989 |
| Percentage | 54.15% | 45.16% |
- Results: Democratic hold Democratic gain Republican hold
Speaker of the House before election
Don Tripp
Republican
Elected Speaker of the House
Brian Egolf
Democratic

The 2016 New Mexico House of Representatives election took place as part of the biennial United States elections. New Mexico voters elected state representatives in all 70 of the state house's districts. State representatives serve two-year terms in the New Mexico House of Representatives. The election coincided with elections for other offices, including the Presidency, the special election for Secretary of State, the U.S. House, and the State Senate.

A primary election held on June 7, 2016, determined which candidates appear on the November 8th general election ballot.

== Results summary ==
| District | Incumbent | Party | Elected representative | Party |
|---|---|---|---|---|
| 1st | Rod Montoya | Rep | Rod Montoya | Rep |
| 2nd | James Strickler | Rep | James Strickler | Rep |
| 3rd | Paul Bandy | Rep | Paul Bandy | Rep |
| 4th | Sharon Clahchischilliage | Rep | Sharon Clahchischilliage | Rep |
| 5th | Doreen Wonda Johnson | Dem | Doreen Wonda Johnson | Dem |
| 6th | Eliseo Alcon | Dem | Eliseo Alcon | Dem |
| 7th | Kelly Fajardo | Rep | Kelly Fajardo | Rep |
| 8th | Alonzo Baldonado | Rep | Alonzo Baldonado | Rep |
| 9th | Patricia Lundstrom | Dem | Patricia Lundstrom | Dem |
| 10th | Andrés Romero | Dem | Andrés Romero | Dem |
| 11th | Javier Martínez | Dem | Javier Martínez | Dem |
| 12th | Patricio Ruiloba | Dem | Patricio Ruiloba | Dem |
| 13th | Patricia Roybal Caballero | Dem | Patricia Roybal Caballero | Dem |
| 14th | Miguel Garcia | Dem | Miguel Garcia | Dem |
| 15th | Sarah Maestas Barnes | Rep | Sarah Maestas Barnes | Rep |
| 16th | Moe Maestas | Dem | Moe Maestas | Dem |
| 17th | Deborah Armstrong | Dem | Deborah Armstrong | Dem |
| 18th | Gail Chasey | Dem | Gail Chasey | Dem |
| 19th | Sheryl Williams Stapleton | Dem | Sheryl Williams Stapleton | Dem |
| 20th | Jim Dines | Rep | Jim Dines | Rep |
| 21st | Idalia Lechuga-Tena | Dem | Debra Sariñana | Dem |
| 22nd | Gregg Schmedes | Rep | Gregg Schmedes | Rep |
| 23rd | Paul Pacheco | Rep | Daymon Ely | Dem |
| 24th | Conrad James | Rep | Liz Thomson | Dem |
| 25th | Christine Trujillo | Dem | Christine Trujillo | Dem |
| 26th | Georgene Louis | Dem | Georgene Louis | Dem |
| 27th | Larry Larrañaga | Rep | Larry Larrañaga | Rep |
| 28th | Jimmie Hall | Rep | Jimmie Hall | Rep |
| 29th | David Adkins | Rep | David Adkins | Rep |
| 30th | Nate Gentry | Rep | Nate Gentry | Rep |
| 31st | Bill Rehm | Rep | Bill Rehm | Rep |
| 32nd | Dona Irwin | Dem | Candie Sweetser | Dem |
| 33rd | Bill McCamley | Dem | Bill McCamley | Dem |
| 34th | Bealquin "Bill" Gomez | Dem | Bealquin "Bill" Gomez | Dem |
| 35th | Jeff Steinborn | Dem | Angelica Rubio | Dem |
| 36th | Andy Nuñez | Rep | Nathan Small | Dem |
| 37th | Terry McMillan | Rep | Joanne Ferrary | Dem |
| 38th | Dianne Hamilton | Rep | Rebecca Dow | Rep |
| 39th | John L. Zimmerman | Rep | Rodolpho Martinez | Dem |
| 40th | Nick Salazar | Dem | Nick Salazar | Dem |
| 41st | Debbie Rodella | Dem | Debbie Rodella | Dem |
| 42nd | Roberto Gonzales | Dem | Roberto Gonzales | Dem |
| 43rd | Stephanie Garcia Richard | Dem | Stephanie Garcia Richard | Dem |
| 44th | Jane Powdrell-Culbert | Rep | Jane Powdrell-Culbert | Rep |
| 45th | Jim Trujillo | Dem | Jim Trujillo | Dem |
| 46th | Carl Trujillo | Dem | Carl Trujillo | Dem |
| 47th | Brian Egolf | Dem | Brian Egolf | Dem |
| 48th | Lucky Varela | Dem | Linda Trujillo | Dem |
| 49th | Don Tripp | Rep | Don Tripp | Rep |
| 50th | Matthew McQueen | Dem | Matthew McQueen | Dem |
| 51st | Yvette Herrell | Rep | Yvette Herrell | Rep |
| 52nd | Doreen Gallegos | Dem | Doreen Gallegos | Dem |
| 53rd | Rick Little | Rep | Ricky Little | Rep |
| 54th | Jim Townsend | Rep | Jim Townsend | Rep |
| 55th | Cathrynn Brown | Rep | Cathrynn Brown | Rep |
| 56th | Zachary Cook | Rep | Zachary Cook | Rep |
| 57th | Jason Harper | Rep | Jason Harper | Rep |
| 58th | Candy Ezzell | Rep | Candy Ezzell | Rep |
| 59th | Nora Espinoza | Rep | Greg Nibert | Rep |
| 60th | Tim Lewis | Rep | Tim Lewis | Rep |
| 61st | David Gallegos | Rep | David Gallegos | Rep |
| 62nd | Larry Scott | Rep | Larry Scott | Rep |
| 63rd | George Dodge Jr. | Dem | George Dodge Jr. | Dem |
| 64th | Randal Crowder | Rep | Randal Crowder | Rep |
| 65th | James Madalena | Dem | Derrick Lente | Dem |
| 66th | Bob Wooley | Rep | Bob Wooley | Rep |
| 67th | Dennis Roch | Rep | Dennis Roch | Rep |
| 68th | Monica Youngblood | Rep | Monica Youngblood | Rep |
| 69th | Harry Garcia | Dem | Harry Garcia | Dem |
| 70th | Tomás Salazar | Dem | Tomás Salazar | Dem |

| Party | Candi- dates | Votes | | Seats | | |
| Party | Candi- dates | No. | % | No. | +/– | % |
|---|---|---|---|---|---|---|
| Democratic | 54 | 365,713 | 54.153 | 38 | ▲5 | 54.29 |
| Republican | 43 | 304,989 | 45.161 | 32 | ▼5 | 45.71 |
| Independent | 2 | 4,629 | 0.685 | 0 | Steady | 0.00 |
| Total | 99 | 675,331 | 100% | 70 | Steady | 100% |

House seats
| Democratic | 54.29% |
| Republican | 45.71% |

Popular vote
| Democratic | 54.153% |
| Republican | 45.161% |
| Independent | 0.685% |

=== Incumbents defeated in the primary election ===
- Idalia Lechuga-Tena (D-District 21), defeated by Debra Sariñana (D)

=== Incumbents defeated in the general election ===
- Paul Pacheco (R-District 23), defeated by Daymon Ely (D)
- Andy Nuñez (R-District 36), defeated by Nathan Small (D)
- Terry McMillan (R-District 37), defeated by Joanne Ferrary (D)
- John L. Zimmerman (R-District 39), defeated by Rodolpho Martinez (D)

=== Open seats that changed parties ===
- Conrad James (R-District 24) didn't seek re-election, seat won by Liz Thomson (D)

== Predictions ==
| Source | Ranking | As of |
|---|---|---|
| Governing | Tossup | October 12, 2016 |

== Detailed results ==
Source:New Mexico Secretary of State

=== District 1 ===
Incumbent Republican Rod Montoya has represented the 1st district since 2015.

New Mexico House of Representatives 1st district general election, 2016
| Party | Candidate | Votes | % |
|---|---|---|---|
| Republican | Rod Montoya (incumbent) | 10,717 | 100% |
| Total votes | | 10,717 | 100% |
| Republican hold | | | |

=== District 2 ===
Incumbent Republican James Strickler has represented the 2nd district since 2007.

New Mexico House of Representatives 2nd district general election, 2016
| Party | Candidate | Votes | % |
|---|---|---|---|
| Republican | James Strickler (incumbent) | 6,083 | 71.97% |
| Democratic | Kenneth R. Robinson | 2,369 | 28.03% |
| Total votes | | 8,452 | 100% |
| Republican hold | | | |

=== District 3 ===
Incumbent Republican Paul Bandy has represented the 3rd district since 2007.

New Mexico House of Representatives 3rd district general election, 2016
| Party | Candidate | Votes | % |
|---|---|---|---|
| Republican | Paul Bandy (incumbent) | 8,299 | 100% |
| Total votes | | 8,299 | 100% |
| Republican hold | | | |

=== District 4 ===
Incumbent Republican Sharon Clahchischilliage has represented the 4th district since 2013.

New Mexico House of Representatives 4th district general election, 2016
| Party | Candidate | Votes | % |
|---|---|---|---|
| Republican | Sharon Clahchischilliage (incumbent) | 5,056 | 54.29% |
| Democratic | Glojean B. Todacheene | 4,257 | 45.71% |
| Total votes | | 9,313 | 100% |
| Republican hold | | | |

=== District 5 ===
Incumbent Democrat Doreen Wonda Johnson has represented the 5th district since 2015.

New Mexico House of Representatives 5th district general election, 2016
| Party | Candidate | Votes | % |
|---|---|---|---|
| Democratic | Doreen Wonda Johnson (incumbent) | 7,558 | 100% |
| Total votes | | 7,558 | 100% |
| Democratic hold | | | |

=== District 6 ===
Incumbent Democrat Eliseo Alcon has represented the 6th district since 2009.

New Mexico House of Representatives 6th district general election, 2016
| Party | Candidate | Votes | % |
|---|---|---|---|
| Democratic | Eliseo Alcon (incumbent) | 6,707 | 100% |
| Total votes | | 6,707 | 100% |
| Democratic hold | | | |

=== District 7 ===
Incumbent Republican Kelly Fajardo has represented the 7th district since 2013.

New Mexico House of Representatives 7th district general election, 2016
| Party | Candidate | Votes | % |
|---|---|---|---|
| Republican | Kelly Fajardo (incumbent) | 5,149 | 56.50% |
| Democratic | Arturo Fierro | 3,964 | 43.50% |
| Total votes | | 9,113 | 100% |
| Republican hold | | | |

=== District 8 ===
Incumbent Republican Alonzo Baldonado has represented the 8th district since 2011.

New Mexico House of Representatives 8th district general election, 2016
| Party | Candidate | Votes | % |
|---|---|---|---|
| Republican | Alonzo Baldonado (incumbent) | 7,251 | 61.74% |
| Democratic | Jim D. Danner | 4,493 | 38.26% |
| Total votes | | 11,744 | 100% |
| Republican hold | | | |

=== District 9 ===
Incumbent Democrat Patricia Lundstrom has represented the 9th district since 2003.

New Mexico House of Representatives 9th district general election, 2016
| Party | Candidate | Votes | % |
|---|---|---|---|
| Democratic | Patricia Lundstrom (incumbent) | 6,446 | 100% |
| Total votes | | 6,446 | 100% |
| Democratic hold | | | |

=== District 10 ===
Incumbent Democrat Andrés Romero has represented the 10th district since 2015.

New Mexico House of Representatives 10th district general election, 2016
| Party | Candidate | Votes | % |
|---|---|---|---|
| Democratic | Andrés Romero (incumbent) | 4,821 | 67.35% |
| Independent | Robert A. Schiller | 2,337 | 32.65% |
| Total votes | | 7,158 | 100% |
| Democratic hold | | | |

=== District 11 ===
Incumbent Democrat Javier Martinez has represented the 11th district since 2015.

New Mexico House of Representatives 11th district general election, 2016
| Party | Candidate | Votes | % |
|---|---|---|---|
| Democratic | Javier Martinez (incumbent) | 10,118 | 100% |
| Total votes | | 10,118 | 100% |
| Democratic hold | | | |

=== District 12 ===
Incumbent Democrat Patricio Ruiloba has represented the 12th district since 2015.

New Mexico House of Representatives 12th district general election, 2016
| Party | Candidate | Votes | % |
|---|---|---|---|
| Democratic | Patricio Ruiloba (incumbent) | 5,036 | 100% |
| Total votes | | 5,036 | 100% |
| Democratic hold | | | |

=== District 13 ===
Incumbent Democrat Patricia Roybal Caballero has represented the 13th district since 2013.

New Mexico House of Representatives 13th district general election, 2016
| Party | Candidate | Votes | % |
|---|---|---|---|
| Democratic | Patricia Roybal Caballero (incumbent) | 5,525 | 100% |
| Total votes | | 5,525 | 100% |
| Democratic hold | | | |

=== District 14 ===
Incumbent Democrat Miguel Garcia has represented the 14th district since 1997.

New Mexico House of Representatives 14th district general election, 2016
| Party | Candidate | Votes | % |
|---|---|---|---|
| Democratic | Miguel Garcia (incumbent) | 6,209 | 100% |
| Total votes | | 6,209 | 100% |
| Democratic hold | | | |

=== District 15 ===
Incumbent Republican Sarah Maestas Barnes has represented the 15th district since 2015.

New Mexico House of Representatives 15th district general election, 2016
| Party | Candidate | Votes | % |
|---|---|---|---|
| Republican | Sarah Maestas Barnes (incumbent) | 7,358 | 53.22% |
| Democratic | Ane C. Romero | 6,467 | 46.78% |
| Total votes | | 13,825 | 100% |
| Republican hold | | | |

=== District 16 ===
Incumbent Democrat Moe Maestas has represented the 16th district since 2007.

New Mexico House of Representatives 16th district general election, 2016
| Party | Candidate | Votes | % |
|---|---|---|---|
| Democratic | Moe Maestas (incumbent) | 8,256 | 100% |
| Total votes | | 8,256 | 100% |
| Democratic hold | | | |

=== District 17 ===
Incumbent Democrat Deborah Armstrong has represented the 17th district since 2015.

New Mexico House of Representatives 17th district general election, 2016
| Party | Candidate | Votes | % |
|---|---|---|---|
| Democratic | Deborah Armstrong (incumbent) | 8,640 | 100% |
| Total votes | | 8,640 | 100% |
| Democratic hold | | | |

=== District 18 ===
Incumbent Democrat Gail Chasey has represented the 18th district since 1997.

New Mexico House of Representatives 18th district general election, 2016
| Party | Candidate | Votes | % |
|---|---|---|---|
| Democratic | Gail Chasey (incumbent) | 9,922 | 100% |
| Total votes | | 9,922 | 100% |
| Democratic hold | | | |

=== District 19 ===
Incumbent Democrat Sheryl Williams Stapleton has represented the 19th district since 1995.

New Mexico House of Representatives 19th district general election, 2016
| Party | Candidate | Votes | % |
|---|---|---|---|
| Democratic | Sheryl Williams Stapleton (incumbent) | 8,289 | 100% |
| Total votes | | 8,289 | 100% |
| Democratic hold | | | |

=== District 20 ===
Incumbent Republican Jim Dines has represented the 20th district since 2015.

New Mexico House of Representatives 20th district general election, 2016
| Party | Candidate | Votes | % |
|---|---|---|---|
| Republican | Jim Dines (incumbent) | 7,350 | 57.70% |
| Democratic | Giovanni Alexander Haqani | 5,389 | 42.30% |
| Total votes | | 12,739 | 100% |
| Republican hold | | | |

=== District 21 ===
Incumbent Democrat Idalia Lechuga-Tena has represented the 21st district since 2015. Lechuga-Tena lost re-nomination to fellow Democrat Debra Sariñana, who was unopposed in the general election.

New Mexico House of Representatives21st district general election, 2016
| Party | Candidate | Votes | % |
|---|---|---|---|
| Democratic | Debra Sariñana | 4,685 | 100% |
| Total votes | | 4,685 | 100% |
| Democratic hold | | | |

=== District 22 ===
Incumbent Republican James Smith has represented the 22nd district since 2011.

New Mexico House of Representatives 22nd district general election, 2016
| Party | Candidate | Votes | % |
|---|---|---|---|
| Republican | James Smith (incumbent) | 9,630 | 56.18% |
| Democratic | John M. Wallace | 7,510 | 43.82% |
| Total votes | | 17,140 | 100% |
| Republican hold | | | |

=== District 23 ===
Incumbent Republican Paul Pacheco has represented the 23rd district since 2013. He lost re-election to Democrat Daymon Ely.

New Mexico House of Representatives 23rd district general election, 2016
| Party | Candidate | Votes | % |
|---|---|---|---|
| Democratic | Daymon Ely | 7,127 | 50.37% |
| Republican | Paul Pacheco (incumbent) | 7,022 | 49.63% |
| Total votes | | 14,149 | 100% |
| Democratic gain from Republican | | | |

=== District 24 ===
Incumbent Republican Conrad James has represented the 24th district since 2015. James didn't seek re-election and former Democratic incumbent Liz Thomson won the open seat.

New Mexico House of Representatives 24th district general election, 2016
| Party | Candidate | Votes | % |
|---|---|---|---|
| Democratic | Liz Thomson | 6,798 | 52.31% |
| Republican | Christinia Marie Hall | 6,198 | 47.69% |
| Total votes | | 12,996 | 100% |
| Democratic gain from Republican | | | |

=== District 25 ===
Incumbent Democrat Christine Trujillo has represented the 25th district since 2013.

New Mexico House of Representatives 25th district general election, 2016
| Party | Candidate | Votes | % |
|---|---|---|---|
| Democratic | Christine Trujillo (incumbent) | 9,807 | 100% |
| Total votes | | 9,807 | 100% |
| Democratic hold | | | |

=== District 26 ===
Incumbent Democrat Georgene Louis has represented the 26th district since 2013.

New Mexico House of Representatives 26th district general election, 2016
| Party | Candidate | Votes | % |
|---|---|---|---|
| Democratic | Georgene Louis (incumbent) | 4,800 | 100% |
| Total votes | | 4,800 | 100% |
| Democratic hold | | | |

=== District 27 ===
Incumbent Republican Larry Larrañaga has represented the 27th district since 1995.

New Mexico House of Representatives 27th district general election, 2016
| Party | Candidate | Votes | % |
|---|---|---|---|
| Republican | Larry Larrañaga (incumbent) | 9,110 | 58.52% |
| Democratic | Ronald E. Krise | 6,457 | 41.48% |
| Total votes | | 15,567 | 100% |
| Republican hold | | | |

=== District 28 ===
Incumbent Republican Jimmie Hall has represented the 28th district since 2005.

New Mexico House of Representatives 28th district general election, 2016
| Party | Candidate | Votes | % |
|---|---|---|---|
| Republican | Jimmie Hall (incumbent) | 10,279 | 100% |
| Total votes | | 10,279 | 100% |
| Republican hold | | | |

=== District 29 ===
Incumbent Republican David Adkins has represented the 29th district since 2015.

New Mexico House of Representatives 29th district general election, 2016
| Party | Candidate | Votes | % |
|---|---|---|---|
| Republican | David Adkins (incumbent) | 6,977 | 50.03% |
| Democratic | Ronnie Martinez | 6,968 | 49.97% |
| Total votes | | 13,945 | 100% |
| Republican hold | | | |

=== District 30 ===
Incumbent Republican Nate Gentry has represented the 30th district since 2011.

New Mexico House of Representatives 30th district general election, 2016
| Party | Candidate | Votes | % |
|---|---|---|---|
| Republican | Nate Gentry (incumbent) | 6,841 | 52.19% |
| Democratic | Natalie Figueroa | 6,267 | 47.81% |
| Total votes | | 13,108 | 100% |
| Republican hold | | | |

=== District 31 ===
Incumbent Republican Bill Rehm has represented the 31st district since 2007.

New Mexico House of Representatives 31st district general election, 2016
| Party | Candidate | Votes | % |
|---|---|---|---|
| Republican | Bill Rehm (incumbent) | 10,760 | 60.41% |
| Democratic | Robert L. Scott | 7,051 | 39.59% |
| Total votes | | 17,811 | 100% |
| Republican hold | | | |

=== District 32 ===
Incumbent Democrat Dona Irwin has represented the 32nd district since 1999. Irwin retired and fellow Democrat Candie Sweetser won the open seat.

New Mexico House of Representatives 32nd district general election, 2016
| Party | Candidate | Votes | % |
|---|---|---|---|
| Democratic | Candie Sweetser | 4,486 | 51.32% |
| Republican | Vicki K. Chavez | 4,256 | 48.68% |
| Total votes | | 8,742 | 100% |
| Democratic hold | | | |

=== District 33 ===
Incumbent Democrat Bill McCamley has represented the 33rd district since 2013.

New Mexico House of Representatives 33rd district general election, 2016
| Party | Candidate | Votes | % |
|---|---|---|---|
| Democratic | Bill McCamley (incumbent) | 6,605 | 64.60% |
| Republican | Neal L. Hooks | 3,619 | 35.40% |
| Total votes | | 10,224 | 100% |
| Democratic hold | | | |

=== District 34 ===
Incumbent Democrat Bealquin "Bill" Gomez has represented the 34th district since 2015.

New Mexico House of Representatives 34th district general election, 2016
| Party | Candidate | Votes | % |
|---|---|---|---|
| Democratic | Bealquin "Bill" Gomez (incumbent) | 5,757 | 100% |
| Total votes | | 5,757 | 100% |
| Democratic hold | | | |

=== District 35 ===
Incumbent Democrat Jeff Steinborn has represented the 35th district since 2013. Steinborn retired to run for the New Mexico Senate. Democrat Angelica Rubio won the open seat.

New Mexico House of Representatives 35th district general election, 2016
| Party | Candidate | Votes | % |
|---|---|---|---|
| Democratic | Angelica Rubio | 6,412 | 62.90% |
| Republican | Joseph E. Bishop | 3,782 | 37.10% |
| Total votes | | 10,194 | 100% |
| Democratic hold | | | |

=== District 36 ===
Incumbent Republican Andy Nuñez has represented the 36th district since 2015. He lost re-election to Democrat Nathan Small.

New Mexico House of Representatives 36th district general election, 2016
| Party | Candidate | Votes | % |
|---|---|---|---|
| Democratic | Nathan Small | 5,435 | 56.50% |
| Republican | Andy Nuñez (incumbent) | 4,184 | 43.50% |
| Total votes | | 9,619 | 100% |
| Democratic gain from Republican | | | |

=== District 37 ===
Incumbent Republican Terry McMillan has represented the 37th district since 2011. McMillan lost re-election to Democrat Joanne Ferrary.

New Mexico House of Representatives 37th district general election, 2016
| Party | Candidate | Votes | % |
|---|---|---|---|
| Democratic | Joanne Ferrary | 7,483 | 52.54% |
| Republican | Terry McMillan (incumbent) | 6,760 | 47.46% |
| Total votes | | 14,243 | 100% |
| Democratic gain from Republican | | | |

=== District 38 ===
Incumbent Republican Dianne Hamilton has represented the 38th district since 1999. Hamilton retired and fellow Republican Rebecca Dow won the open seat.

New Mexico House of Representatives 38th district general election, 2016
| Party | Candidate | Votes | % |
|---|---|---|---|
| Republican | Rebecca Dow | 7,149 | 54.79% |
| Democratic | Mary E. Hotvedt | 5,900 | 45.21% |
| Total votes | | 13,049 | 100% |
| Republican hold | | | |

=== District 39 ===
Incumbent Republican John L. Zimmerman has represented the 39th district since 2015. He lost re-election to Democrat Rodolpho Martinez.

New Mexico House of Representatives 39th district general election, 2016
| Party | Candidate | Votes | % |
|---|---|---|---|
| Democratic | Rodolpho Martinez | 5,103 | 51.12% |
| Republican | John L. Zimmerman (incumbent) | 4,880 | 48.88% |
| Total votes | | 9,983 | 100% |
| Democratic gain from Republican | | | |

=== District 40 ===
Incumbent Democrat Nick Salazar has represented the 40th district since 1974.

New Mexico House of Representatives 40th district general election, 2016
| Party | Candidate | Votes | % |
|---|---|---|---|
| Democratic | Nick Salazar (incumbent) | 9,038 | 100% |
| Total votes | | 9,038 | 100% |
| Democratic hold | | | |

=== District 41 ===
Incumbent Democrat Debbie Rodella has represented the 41st district since 1993.

New Mexico House of Representatives 41st district general election, 2016
| Party | Candidate | Votes | % |
|---|---|---|---|
| Democratic | Debbie Rodella (incumbent) | 8,088 | 100% |
| Total votes | | 8,088 | 100% |
| Democratic hold | | | |

=== District 42 ===
Incumbent Democrat Roberto Gonzales has represented the 42nd district since 1995.

New Mexico House of Representatives 42nd district general election, 2016
| Party | Candidate | Votes | % |
|---|---|---|---|
| Democratic | Roberto Gonzales (incumbent) | 10,654 | 100% |
| Total votes | | 10,654 | 100% |
| Democratic hold | | | |

=== District 43 ===
Incumbent Democrat Stephanie Garcia Richard has represented the 43rd district since 2013.

New Mexico House of Representatives 43rd district general election, 2016
| Party | Candidate | Votes | % |
|---|---|---|---|
| Democratic | Stephanie Garcia Richard (incumbent) | 8,452 | 58.85% |
| Republican | Sharon Stover | 5,910 | 41.15% |
| Total votes | | 14,362 | 100% |
| Democratic hold | | | |

=== District 44 ===
Incumbent has represented the 44th district since 2003.

New Mexico House of Representatives 44th district general election, 2016
| Party | Candidate | Votes | % |
|---|---|---|---|
| Republican | Jane Powdrell-Culbert (incumbent) | 12,245 | 100% |
| Total votes | | 12,245 | 100% |
| Republican hold | | | |

=== District 45 ===
Incumbent Democrat Jim Trujillo has represented the 45th district since 2003.

New Mexico House of Representatives 45th district general election, 2016
| Party | Candidate | Votes | % |
|---|---|---|---|
| Democratic | Jim Trujillo (incumbent) | 9,425 | 100% |
| Total votes | | 9,425 | 100% |
| Democratic hold | | | |

=== District 46 ===
Incumbent Democrat Carl Trujillo has represented the 46th district since 2013.

New Mexico House of Representatives 46th district general election, 2016
| Party | Candidate | Votes | % |
|---|---|---|---|
| Democratic | Carl Trujillo (incumbent) | 11,563 | 100% |
| Total votes | | 11,563 | 100% |
| Democratic hold | | | |

=== District 47 ===
Incumbent Democrat Brian Egolf has represented the 47th district since 2009.

New Mexico House of Representatives 47th district general election, 2016
| Party | Candidate | Votes | % |
|---|---|---|---|
| Democratic | Brian Egolf (incumbent) | 13,740 | 78.90% |
| Republican | Roger Andrew Gonzales | 3,675 | 21.10% |
| Total votes | | 17,415 | 100% |
| Democratic hold | | | |

=== District 48 ===
Incumbent Democrat Lucky Varela has represented the 48th district since 1987. Varela retired and fellow Democrat Linda Trujillo won the open seat.

New Mexico House of Representatives 48th district general election, 2016
| Party | Candidate | Votes | % |
|---|---|---|---|
| Democratic | Linda Trujillo | 10,572 | 100% |
| Total votes | | 10,572 | 100% |
| Democratic hold | | | |

=== District 49 ===
Incumbent Republican House Speaker Don Tripp has represented the 49th district since 1999.

New Mexico House of Representatives 49th district general election, 2016
| Party | Candidate | Votes | % |
|---|---|---|---|
| Republican | Don Tripp (incumbent) | 8,864 | 100% |
| Total votes | | 8,864 | 100% |
| Republican hold | | | |

=== District 50 ===
Incumbent Democrat Matthew McQueen has represented the 50th district since 2015.

New Mexico House of Representatives 50th district general election, 2016
| Party | Candidate | Votes | % |
|---|---|---|---|
| Democratic | Matthew McQueen (incumbent) | 8,187 | 58.51% |
| Republican | Jeremy Ryan Tremko | 5,805 | 41.49% |
| Total votes | | 13,992 | 100% |
| Democratic hold | | | |

=== District 51 ===
Incumbent Republican Yvette Herrell has represented the 51st district since 2011.

New Mexico House of Representatives 51st district general election, 2016
| Party | Candidate | Votes | % |
|---|---|---|---|
| Republican | Yvette Herrell (incumbent) | 6,447 | 65.79% |
| Democratic | Denise A. Lang | 3,353 | 34.21% |
| Total votes | | 9,800 | 100% |
| Republican hold | | | |

=== District 52 ===
Incumbent Democrat Doreen Gallegos has represented the 52nd district since 2013.

New Mexico House of Representatives 52nd district general election, 2016
| Party | Candidate | Votes | % |
|---|---|---|---|
| Democratic | Doreen Gallegos (incumbent) | 5,796 | 100% |
| Total votes | | 5,796 | 100% |
| Democratic hold | | | |

=== District 53 ===
Incumbent Republican Ricky Little has represented the 53rd district since 2015.

New Mexico House of Representatives 53rd district general election, 2016
| Party | Candidate | Votes | % |
|---|---|---|---|
| Republican | Ricky Little (incumbent) | 2,804 | 51.26% |
| Democratic | Willie Madrid | 2,666 | 48.74% |
| Total votes | | 5,470 | 100% |
| Republican hold | | | |

=== District 54 ===
Incumbent Republican Jim Townsend has represented the 54th district since 2015.

New Mexico House of Representatives 54th district general election, 2016
| Party | Candidate | Votes | % |
|---|---|---|---|
| Republican | Jim Townsend (incumbent) | 7,098 | 75.59% |
| Independent | Freddie Joe Nichols III | 2,292 | 24.41% |
| Total votes | | 9,390 | 100% |
| Republican hold | | | |

=== District 55 ===
Incumbent Republican Cathrynn Brown has represented the 55th district since 2011.

New Mexico House of Representatives 55th district general election, 2016
| Party | Candidate | Votes | % |
|---|---|---|---|
| Republican | Cathrynn Brown (incumbent) | 9,280 | 100% |
| Total votes | | 9,280 | 100% |
| Republican hold | | | |

=== District 56 ===
Incumbent Republican Zachary Cook has represented the 56th district since 2009.

New Mexico House of Representatives 56th district general election, 2016
| Party | Candidate | Votes | % |
|---|---|---|---|
| Republican | Zachary Cook (incumbent) | 7,672 | 100% |
| Total votes | | 7,672 | 100% |
| Republican hold | | | |

=== District 57 ===
Incumbent Republican Jason Harper has represented the 57th district since 2013.

New Mexico House of Representatives 57th district general election, 2016
| Party | Candidate | Votes | % |
|---|---|---|---|
| Republican | Jason Harper (incumbent) | 6,117 | 54.96% |
| Democratic | Donna I. Tillman | 5,013 | 45.04% |
| Total votes | | 11,130 | 100% |
| Republican hold | | | |

=== District 58 ===
Incumbent Republican Candy Ezzell has represented the 58th district since 2005.

New Mexico House of Representatives 58th district general election, 2016
| Party | Candidate | Votes | % |
|---|---|---|---|
| Republican | Candy Ezzell (incumbent) | 5,001 | 100% |
| Total votes | | 5,001 | 100% |
| Republican hold | | | |

=== District 59 ===
Incumbent Republican Nora Espinoza has represented the 59th district since 2007. Espinoza retired to run for Secretary of State. Republican Greg Nibert won the open seat.

New Mexico House of Representatives 59th district general election, 2016
| Party | Candidate | Votes | % |
|---|---|---|---|
| Republican | Greg Nibert | 8,594 | 71.27% |
| Democratic | Richard James Garcia | 3,465 | 28.73% |
| Total votes | | 12,059 | 100% |
| Republican hold | | | |

=== District 60 ===
Incumbent Republican Tim Lewis has represented the 60th district since 2011.

New Mexico House of Representatives 60th district general election, 2016
| Party | Candidate | Votes | % |
|---|---|---|---|
| Republican | Tim Lewis (incumbent) | 9,824 | 100% |
| Total votes | | 9,824 | 100% |
| Republican hold | | | |

=== District 61 ===
Incumbent Republican David Gallegos has represented the 61st district since 2013.

New Mexico House of Representatives 61st district general election, 2016
| Party | Candidate | Votes | % |
|---|---|---|---|
| Republican | David Gallegos (incumbent) | 4,735 | 100% |
| Total votes | | 4,735 | 100% |
| Republican hold | | | |

=== District 62 ===
Incumbent Republican Larry Scott has represented the 62nd district since 2015.

New Mexico House of Representatives 62nd district general election, 2016
| Party | Candidate | Votes | % |
|---|---|---|---|
| Republican | Larry Scott (incumbent) | 7,948 | 100% |
| Total votes | | 7,948 | 100% |
| Republican hold | | | |

=== District 63 ===
Incumbent Democrat George Dodge Jr. has represented the 63rd district since 2011.

New Mexico House of Representatives 63rd district general election, 2016
| Party | Candidate | Votes | % |
|---|---|---|---|
| Democratic | George Dodge Jr. (incumbent) | 5,142 | 100% |
| Total votes | | 5,142 | 100% |
| Democratic hold | | | |

=== District 64 ===
Incumbent Republican Randal Crowder has represented the 64th district since 2015.

New Mexico House of Representatives 64th district general election, 2016
| Party | Candidate | Votes | % |
|---|---|---|---|
| Republican | Randal Crowder (incumbent) | 7,732 | 100% |
| Total votes | | 7,732 | 100% |
| Republican hold | | | |

=== District 65 ===
Incumbent Democrat James Madalena has represented the 65th district since 1985. Madelena retired and fellow Democrat Derrick Lente won the open seat.

New Mexico House of Representatives 65th district general election, 2016
| Party | Candidate | Votes | % |
|---|---|---|---|
| Democratic | Derrick Lente | 7,162 | 100% |
| Total votes | | 7,162 | 100% |
| Democratic hold | | | |

=== District 66 ===
Incumbent Republican Bob Wooley has represented the 66th district since 2011.

New Mexico House of Representatives 66th district general election, 2016
| Party | Candidate | Votes | % |
|---|---|---|---|
| Republican | Bob Wooley (incumbent) | 8,427 | 100% |
| Total votes | | 8,427 | 100% |
| Republican hold | | | |

=== District 67 ===
Incumbent Republican Dennis Roch has represented the 67th district since 2009.

New Mexico House of Representatives 67th district general election, 2016
| Party | Candidate | Votes | % |
|---|---|---|---|
| Republican | Dennis Roch (incumbent) | 8,464 | 100% |
| Total votes | | 8,464 | 100% |
| Republican hold | | | |

=== District 68 ===
Incumbent Republican Monica Youngblood has represented the 68th district since 2013.

New Mexico House of Representatives 68th district general election, 2016
| Party | Candidate | Votes | % |
|---|---|---|---|
| Republican | Monica Youngblood (incumbent) | 9,637 | 100% |
| Total votes | | 9,637 | 100% |
| Republican hold | | | |

=== District 69 ===
Incumbent Democrat Ken Martinez had represented the 69th district since 1999. Martinez resigned and Democrat Harry Garcia was appointed to replace him on September 9, 2016. Garcia was elected to a full term unopposed.

New Mexico House of Representatives 69th district general election, 2016
| Party | Candidate | Votes | % |
|---|---|---|---|
| Democratic | Harry Garcia (incumbent) | 6,155 | 100% |
| Total votes | | 6,155 | 100% |
| Democratic hold | | | |

=== District 70 ===
Incumbent Democrat Tomás Salazar has represented the 70th district since 2013.

New Mexico House of Representatives 70th district general election, 2016
| Party | Candidate | Votes | % |
|---|---|---|---|
| Democratic | Tomás Salazar (incumbent) | 8,125 | 100% |
| Total votes | | 8,125 | 100% |
| Democratic hold | | | |

== See also ==
- 2016 United States elections
- 2016 United States House of Representatives elections in New Mexico
- 2016 New Mexico elections
- Elections in New Mexico
