= List of speakers of the New Mexico House of Representatives =

Speaker of New Mexico House of Representatives
- Seal of the New Mexico House of Representatives
- Incumbent; Javier Martínez since January 17, 2023
- Status: Presiding officer
- Seat: New Mexico State Capitol, Santa Fe
- Appointer: New Mexico House of Representatives
- Inaugural holder: Roman L. Baca

The following is a list of speakers of the New Mexico House of Representatives since statehood.

== Speakers of the New Mexico House of Representatives ==
Speaker	Term	Party	County/Residence	Notes	Citation
Roman L. Baca	1912–1915	Republican	Santa Fe		
Secundino Romero	1915–1916	Republican	San Miguel		
William H. H. Llewellyn	1916–1919	Republican	Las Cruces		
Antonio A. Sedillo	1919–1921	Republican	Socorro		
Albert H. Clancy	1921–1923	Republican	Santa Fe		
Byron O. Beall	1923–1925	Democratic	Chaves		
D. W. Smith	1925–1931	Democratic	Grant		
Alvan N. White	1931–1939	Democratic	Grant		
George W. Armijo	1939–1941	Democratic	Santa Fe		
Frank J. McCarthy	1941–1943	Democratic	Chaves		
M. S. Smith	1943–1949	Democratic	Curry		
Harry Vearle Payne	1949–1945	Democratic	Hidalgo		
John F. Sims	1949–1951	Democratic	Bernalillo		
Calvin P. Horn	1951–1953	Democratic	Bernalillo		
Alvin Stockton	1953–1955	Republican	Colfax		
Donald D. Hallam	1955–1959	Democratic	Lea		
Mack Easley	1959–1961	Democratic	Lea		
Jack M. Campbell	1961–1963	Democratic	Chaves		
Bruce King	1963–1969	Democratic	Santa Fe		
David L. Norvell	1969–1971	Democratic	Curry		
Walter K. Martinez	1971–1979	Democratic	Valencia		
C. Gene Samberson	1979–1982	Democratic	Lea		
Raymond G. Sanchez	1983–1985	Democratic	Bernalillo		
Gene Samberson	1985–1987	Democratic	Lea		
Raymond G. Sanchez	1987–2001	Democratic	Bernalillo		
Ben Luján	2001–2012	Democratic	Santa Fe		
W. Ken Martinez	2012–2015	Democratic	Albuquerque		
Don Tripp	2015–2017	Republican			
Brian Egolf	2017–2023	Democratic			
Javier Martínez	2023–	Democratic			

== Speakers of the New Mexico Territorial House of Representatives ==
Speaker	Term	Party	County/Residence	Notes	Citation
Theodore D. Wheaton	1851–1854		Taos		
Facundo Pino	1854–1855				
Celedonio Valdés	1855–1856				
José S. Ramirez	1856–1857				
Merrill Ashurst	1857–1858				
José Guadalupe Gallegos	1858–1859				
Levi J. Keithly; C. C. Medina	1859–1860				
José Manuel Gallegos	1860–1863				
Vicente García	1863–1864				
Pedro Valdés	1864–1865				
Samuel Ellison	1865–1866				
Richard M. Stephens	1866–1867				
Jose Manuel Gallegos	1867–1868				
Richard M. Stephens	1868–1869				
Gregorio M. Otero	1869–1870				
Milnor Louis Rudulph	1871–1872				
Gregorio M. Otero	1873–1874				
Roman A. Vaca	1875–1876				
Juan B. Patron	1878–1880		Lincoln		
Rafael Romero	1880–1882				
Pedro Sanchez	1882–1884				
Amado Chavez	1884–1886				
Manuel C. de Baca	1886–1887	Republican	Conant		
Albert J. Fountain	1888–1889		Lincoln, Doña Ana		
William Burns	1890–1891		Kingston		
Alejandro J. Branch	1892–1893		Mora		
William E. Dame	1894–1895		Cerrillos		
William H. H. Llewellyn	1897	Republican	Las Cruces		
Maximiliano Luna	1899		Los Lunas		
Benjamin M. Read	1901		Santa Fe		
Carl A. Dalies	1905	Republican	Belen		
Roman L. Baca	1907–1909	Republican	Santa Fe		
E. A. Miera	1909	Republican	Cuba		

== See also ==
- List of New Mexico state legislatures
