= Mama Lucy Gang =

1970s alliance of liberal New Mexico politicians

Mama Lucy Lopez and her daughter Loretta

The Mama Lucy Gang was an alliance of liberal politicians that controlled the New Mexico House of Representatives in the 1970s. The "gang" was named after a restaurant run by Mrs. Lucy Lopez. Some of the future politicians had eaten there in their student days. Poor students were never turned away hungry, but were allowed credit or given food for work. Mama Lucy was an inspiration to the future lawmakers. They were mostly members of the Democratic Party but included Republicans. They enacted reforms related to education, the environment and equal opportunity. After a short period out of power in 1979–1982, their successors continued to control the House until 2000. In 1973 the representatives presented a memorial to Mama Lucy in the House.

== Background ==
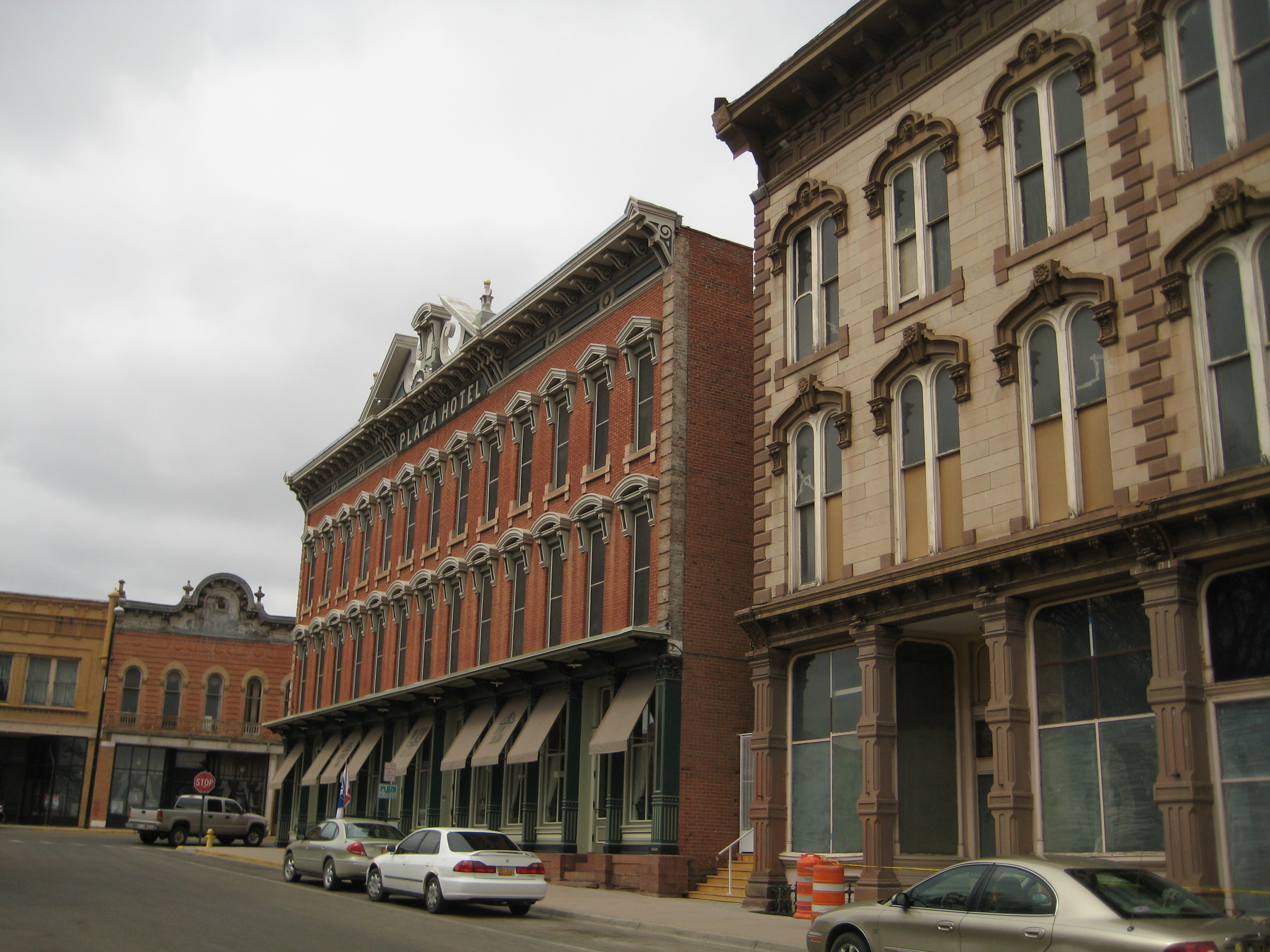
The Plaza Hotel in Las Vegas, home of Mama Lucy's restaurant

Mrs. Lucy Lopez, known as Mama Lucy to her friends, ran the Plaza Hotel Restaurant and Bar in Las Vegas, New Mexico, for fourteen years with her husband before moving across the street to another restaurant on the Las Vegas Plaza. (Note: The Plaza Hotel, which looks over the Old Town Plaza in Las Vegas, was built in 1879 by a group of businessmen led by Don Benigno Romero. It was advertised as the finest hotel in the territory. In 1913 the hotel was the home of Romaine Fielding, the silent film producer. In 1982 the hotel was carefully restored by new owners and now has thirty six guest rooms and a fine dining room.) They rented part of the hotel as a dormitory for New Mexico Highlands University students and sold meal tickets for the restaurant as an alternative to the university cafeteria. Daily lunch and dinner cost $30 a month. Students who were short of money could make a special arrangement in exchange for helping out. A former student recalled, "The only things worth eating in the dorm cafeteria were the milk and the bread, the rest of the food was so terrible many of the kids used to get a meal ticket at Mama Lucy's." The restaurant was self-service, and the students were trusted not to take too much. The food was varied, but Mama Lucy's Spanish dishes were the most popular.

Lucy Lopez's restaurant on the other side of the Las Vegas Plaza was known for her pies. It was a popular spot for politicians, businessman and local leaders to meet and catch up on the news. Old guestbooks from the restaurant contain the signatures of U.S. Senators Joseph Montoya and Dennis Chávez and of New Mexico governors David Cargo, Tom Bolack, Edwin L. Mechem and Jack M. Campbell.

== Name ==
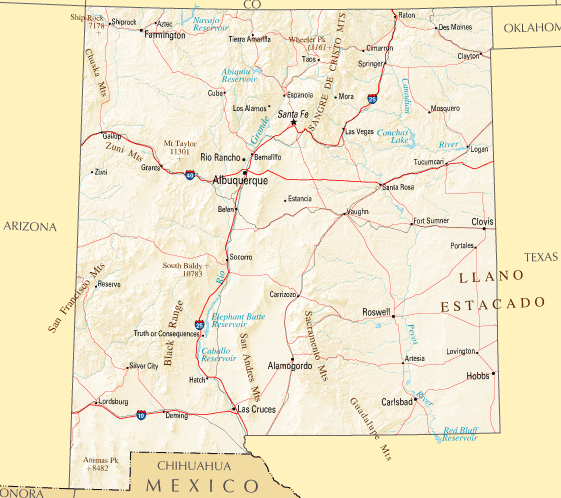
New Mexico. The Mama Lucy Gang was based in the more urban northern part of the state. Albuquerque is the largest city. Santa Fe to the northeast is the state capital. Las Vegas, New Mexico, is east of Santa Fe.

The term "Mama Lucy Gang" was coined in 1966 by the Albuquerque Journal columnist John McMillion. He wrote a column that described a deal he had seen made in the restaurant between Apolonio Duran of San Miguel County and another candidate, and called them "the gang in Mama Lucy's back room". The term "Mama Lucy Gang" stuck as a name for San Miguel County (Las Vegas) politicians, despite protests from Mrs. Lopez and her many friends that she was never involved in politics and had no back room. She closed the restaurant later in 1966, partly due to illness. She claimed the idea that a "gang" was meeting in her restaurant had driven customers away.

Mark Douglas Acuff of The New Mexico Independent has been credited with applying the term "Mama Lucy Gang" to the group of New Mexican progressive liberal legislators of the 1970s. In 1973 this group of state legislators, some of whom had attended Highlands and learned from Mama Lucy's compassionate example, adopted the name. They had previously been called "the Young Turks" and "The Barefoot Gang."

== Political activity ==
In 1962 the Supreme Court's "one person, one vote" decision in Baker v. Carr forced the states to make electoral districts across the country more equally balanced by population. As a result, greater numbers of liberal representatives from Hispanic and urban intellectual backgrounds began to be elected in New Mexico. Until 1971 the House was dominated by conservative Democrats, mostly from the south and east of New Mexico, but in 1971 the liberal democrat Walter K. Martinez was elected speaker. For the next eight years the Mama Lucy Gang led by Martinez controlled the house and kept conservative "Cowboy Democrats" from the ranching areas in the south of the state out of the main committees. David Salman was the majority floor leader during this period.

The Mama Lucy Gang was a loose coalition of centrist Democrats and some Republicans. They included Bernalillo County (Albuquerque) liberals and Northern New Mexico representatives. Most of the Mama Lucy Gang never met Mrs. Lopez, including their leader Walter K. Martinez, who was sometimes himself called "Mama Lucy". Tom Brown Jr., representative for Eddy-Chaves, was known as "the bald-headed Mama Lucy." The senators Manny Aragon and Jerry Apodaca were associated with the Mama Lucy Gang. Apodaca would later become governor.

The Mama Lucy Gang pushed various progressive measures through the legislature over the next six years. These included changes to school funding and measures to protect the environment and promote equal rights. The "Mama Lucies" had a fundamental impact on New Mexico politics. Their opponents complained of the group's "steamroller tactics." Walter Martinez was called a "quiet, soft-spoken and popular leader." Martinez managed to equalize school district funding across the state and to develop New Mexico's severance tax permanent fund. The fund aims to smooth out state revenues which would otherwise fluctuate based on demand for mining products. David Salman sponsored a higher minimum-wage law and bilingual education He also supported various clean energy and environment protection measures.

The Cowboy Democrats did well in the 1978 election and demanded a strong presence on the committees. Martinez turned them down. During the opening session of the House on January 16, 1979, thirty Democrats and three rogue Republicans voted for Martinez. In an unusual move, eleven conservative Democrats allied with twenty-six Republicans to elect the conservative Democrat C. Gene Samberson speaker by thirty seven votes. Samberson appointed nine Democrats to committee positions. Martinez refused to chair the Votes and Elections Committee, effectively giving control of this committee to the Republicans. Five of the Democrats who had backed Martinez refused appointments as vice-chairs of committees. The Mama Lucy Gang was out of power.

== Successors ==
In the 1982 election the liberal Democrats formed a solid majority of the forty-seven Democratic members. The Martinez candidate Raymond G. Sanchez was elected speaker without opposition from the Cowboys. Sanchez was speaker of the house for sixteen years. The coalition of Hispanics, liberal and moderate Democrats, and a few Republicans controlled the New Mexico legislature until the end of the century. In 2000 Raymond Sanchez failed to be reelected to the house, losing to the newcomer John Sanchez, a Republican. The defeat may have been partly due to voters being confused by the names.

== Tribute ==
In April 1973 progressive liberal members of the House paid tribute to Mrs. Lucy Lopez. John J. Mershon, representative from Cloudcroft, introduced a memorial honoring Mrs. Lopez. He belonged to the conservative group that was usually opposed to the Mama Lucy Gang, so his introduction was a gesture of unity. Richard Carbajal, representative from Belen, spoke first. He said "Mama Lucy is the most generous person I have ever met. She was so good to us and helped most of us make it through college. She has a heart as big as she is." He said "If she went bankrupt it was because of the big heart she had. Students like me, broke, could go to Mama Lucy and want to charge a meal. She never once flinched. You never walked away hungry if you knew Mama Lucy."

Mama Lucy had given Bobby Duran, representative from Taos, a job in her restaurant when he was at Highlands. He said, "You gave me a job when I needed it the most. I never could have made it without you." Lucy Lopez died on May 31, 1994, at the age of 80. The impact of the Mama Lucy Gang on state politics in the 1970s is still remembered.

== Sources ==
- "Acuff, Mark Douglas (1940-1994)". New Mexico Historical Biographies. LPD Press. Archived from the original on August 8, 2014.
- "Ex-State Rep. Championed Education". Albuquerque Journal. Associated Press. March 2, 2010.
- Boyd, Dan (March 20, 2010). "Groundbreaking Legislator Eulogized at Capitol". Albuquerque Journal. Archived from the original on July 29, 2014.
- Buckles, Fred (February 15, 1974). "Inside the Capital". Las Vegas Optic.
- Calloway, Larry Joseph (February 10, 2004). "Dreaming Academic Freedom In Las Vegas, N.M.".
- Cousland, Harold R. (February 14, 1974). "Upton, Smalley struggle in daily legislative strife". Deming Headlight. 94 (1). Santa Fe.
- "David Salman Obituary". Santa Fe New Mexican. 2010.
- "A fond farewell to those departed in 2010". Associated Press. January 4, 2011.
- "Walter Martinez (posthumously)". Distinguished Achievement Honorees. University of New Mexico School of Law.
- Hain, Paul L.; Garcia, F. Chris; Clair, Gilbert K. St. (1994). New Mexico Government. UNM Press. ISBN 978-0-8263-1508-3.
- Kousser, Thad (2005). Term Limits and the Dismantling of State Legislative Professionalism. Cambridge University Press. ISBN 978-0-521-54873-1.
- Little, Thomas H.; Ogle, David B. (January 1, 2006). The Legislative Branch of State Government: People, Process, and Politics. ABC-CLIO. p. 355. ISBN 978-1-85109-761-6.
- Martinez, Ken (2009). "Common Geographies". Moving Beyond Borders: Julian Samora and the Establishment of Latino Studies. University of Illinois Press. ISBN 978-0-252-07656-5.
- "Milestones, Markers, Memories". American Cowboy. Active Interest Media, Inc. 1994. ISSN 1079-3690.
- "Old Town in Las Vegas, New Mexico". Colorado Magazine.
- Price, V.B. (December 9, 2013). "Mark Douglas Acuff – 1940 -1994". New Mexico Mercury.
- Pugach, Noel (May–August 2011). "The Revolt of the Mama Lucys: Modern Liberalism Comes to New Mexico". Albuquerque OASIS Catalog.
- "Raymond G. Sanchez". Sanchez, Mowrer & Desiderio P.C.
- Sharp, Nancy Weatherly; Sharp, James Roger (January 1, 1997). American Legislative Leaders in the West, 1911-1994. Greenwood Publishing Group. ISBN 978-0-313-30212-1.
- Steinberg, David (March 4, 1973). "'Mama Lucy Gang' Lives On In Santa Fe". Las Cruces Sun-News. Las Cruces, New Mexico.
- Storey, Bob (April 15, 1973). "The woman behind 'Mama Lucy'". Santa Fe New Mexican. Santa Fe, New Mexico.
- Trujillo, Art (May 3, 2007). "Shortest line's the slowest". Las Vegas Optic.
