= Brittney Barreras =

American politician

Member of the New Mexico House of Representatives from the 12th district
- In office January 19, 2021 – February 3, 2022
- Preceded by: Art De La Cruz
- Succeeded by: Art De La Cruz

Personal details
- Party: Democratic (since 2021)
- Other political affiliations: Independent (before 2021)

Brittney Barreras is an American politician who served as a member of the New Mexico House of Representatives for the 12th district from January 2021 to February 2022. As an independent candidate, Barreras defeated incumbent Democratic write-in candidate Art De La Cruz, who had been nominated to the seat in September 2020 after the resignation of Patricio Ruiloba. However, one week after the general election, Barreras announced that she was joining the Democratic Party, saying that it would have been difficult to win re-election as an independent.

== Early life and education ==
Barreras was raised in South Valley, New Mexico and graduated from Valley High School.

== Career ==
Prior to entering politics, she worked in sales. Barreras ran as an independent candidate for the New Mexico House of Representatives in 2020, defeating incumbent write-in candidate Art De La Cruz, who had been nominated to the seat in September 2020 after the resignation of Patricio Ruiloba. She assumed office on January 19, 2021.

On January 28, 2022, Barreras announced her resignation from the House of Representatives, to focus on her mental health. The announcement came ten days into the 2022 regular legislative session. On February 2, 2022, De La Cruz was appointed by the Bernalillo County commission to fill Barrera's position.
