= Murray Ryan =

Murray Ryan may refer to:

- Murray Ryan (American politician)
- Murray Ryan (Canadian politician)
