= Walter Martínez =

Walter Martínez may refer to:

- Walter K. Martinez (1930–1986), U.S. politician in the state of New Mexico
- Walter Martínez (journalist) (1941–2026), Venezuelan journalist
- Walter Martínez (sport shooter) (born 1967), Nicaraguan sport shooter
- Walter Martínez (footballer, born 1982) (1982–2019), Honduran football forward
- Walter Martínez (footballer, born 1991), Honduran football midfielder
