= David Salman =

American politician (1936–2010)

David Milton Salman
- Born: 11 February 1936; Houston, Texas, US
- Died: 28 February 2010 (aged 75)
- Occupations: Rancher, politician
- Known for: Medical marijuana laws

David Milton Salman (11 February 1936 – 28 February 2010) was a New Mexico state representative who was known for sponsoring the first bill for use of medical marijuana in the state.

== Early years ==
David Milton Salman was born in Houston, Texas, on 11 February 1936. He was from a Jewish family that was involved in shipping in Houston. He graduated from high school in Las Vegas, New Mexico and went on to Princeton University, graduating in 1958. In 1958–59 he served in the Army Field Artillery. Salman purchased the former La Cueva Ranch in Mora County, New Mexico, which he revitalized by producing farm products, particularly raspberries. He was president of the Salman Ranch from 1960 to 2002.

Salman was president of Sierra Gold Dairy for over twenty years at the same time as being a vice president of the First National Bank in Las Vegas. He was a member of the Board of Trustees of the Las Vegas Hospital. Salman was a member of the board of regents of the New Mexico Highlands University from 1963 to 1969.

== Political career ==
Salman was a member of the House of Representatives in New Mexico from 1969 to 1978 for District 69 in Mora, Harding and San Miguel counties. From 1971 to 1978 he was the majority floor leader. He was a member of the "Mama Lucy Gang", a loose coalition of centrist Democrats and some Republicans that controlled the House during most of the 1970s. The group included Bernalillo County liberals and Northern New Mexico representatives. Salman was the main sponsor of the Public Schools Financing Act in 1971 and the School Equalization Fund in 1972. He was also behind the foundation of the International Space Hall of Fame in Alamogordo.

In 1974 Salman was injured in an automobile accident that was followed by years of reconstructive surgery, and this hampered his political career. Salman campaigned for the protection of mountain lions. At one time he arranged for a lion to be brought in the House. He was a sponsor of the public school funding equalization formula. He also sponsored severance taxes on finite natural resources, a higher minimum-wage law and bilingual education Other measures supported by Salman included incentives for solar heating and power systems, energy savings in public buildings, environmental improvement board powers, sulfur emissions control, radioactive materials disposal, the beverage container act and acquisition of Vermejo Park.

In 1978 Salman was the main sponsor of the state's 1978 Controlled Substances Therapeutic Research Act, which allowed the medical use of marijuana. The act was to legalize the use of the drug to relieve pain and suffering from debilitating illnesses. The House Judiciary voted 9–1 to recommend passage of bill. Salman said, "What are we saying to the young people? We're saying that New Mexico, this Legislature, cares about your fellow citizens and (doesn't) want to see them suffer needlessly, subject to Draconian laws." However, the bill did not legalize sale of marijuana. Patients could keep a three-month supply, but would have to grow their own or buy it illegally.

== Later years ==
In April 1980 the Taos News reported mounting opposition to a music and ecology festival that was proposed to be held on the 36,000 acres (15,000 ha) Salman ranch. A number of businessmen in the Mora area had signed a petition against the festival in the remote mountain area of Northern New Mexico, expected to attract up to 300,000 people. The ad hoc committee opposing the festival said "Ours has been a life-long sacrifice to remain free and isolated; It has been our free choice to live, defend and die for our land. It (the festival) Is not only an abuse of our human dignity but also a breakdown of our moral upbringing. At Issue is the violation of our human rights, Invasion of our privacy and security... Our traditional way of life is being abused by publicly advertising that there will be 'practical demonstrations of alternate energy and life systems, display of Southwestern art and culture and ecological restorations projects'."

After leaving office Salman served in the New Mexico Arts Commission for seven years and the New Mexico State Game Commission for four years. David Salman died on 28 February 2010 at the age of 74. At the time of his death he was a board member of the Capital Arts Foundation.
