= Sandra Townsend =

American politician (born 1936)

Member of the New Mexico House of Representatives from the 3rd district
- In office 1995–2007
- Succeeded by: Paul Bandy

Personal details
- Born: December 25, 1936 (age 89) Buffalo, Oklahoma, U.S.
- Party: Republican
- Occupation: Politician

Sandra L. Townsend (born December 25, 1936) was an American politician who was a Republican member of the New Mexico House of Representatives from 1995 to 2007. She was Clerk and Chief Deputy of San Juan County, New Mexico, from 1967 to 1991.
