= T. Ryan Lane =

American politician

Ryan Lane

Minority Leader of the New Mexico House of Representatives
- In office January 17, 2023 – March 14, 2024
- Preceded by: James G. Townsend
- Succeeded by: James G. Townsend (acting)

Member of the New Mexico House of Representatives from the 3rd district
- In office January 19, 2021 – March 14, 2024
- Preceded by: Paul Bandy
- Succeeded by: Bill Hall

Personal details
- Born: Aztec, New Mexico, U.S.
- Party: Republican
- Education: Liberty University (JD)

T. Ryan Lane is an American attorney, businessman, and politician who served as a member of the New Mexico House of Representatives from the 3rd district. Elected in 2020, he assumed office on January 19, 2021.

== Early life and education ==
Born and raised in Aztec, New Mexico, Lane graduated from Aztec High School. After earning his bachelor's degree in mathematics, he earned a Juris Doctor from the Liberty University School of Law.

== Career ==
After graduating from law school, Lane served as a law clerk for Judge James A. Teilborg of the United States District Court for the District of Arizona. Lane then worked as an associate attorney at a law firm in Farmington, New Mexico before returning to his hometown to establish a private legal practice. He then served on the Aztec School Board. Lane ran unopposed in the 2020 Republican primary and November general election. He assumed office on January 19, 2021.

When fellow state Representative Georgene Louis, a Democrat, was arrested for aggravated DWI in February 2022, she called Lane, after the first several of her colleagues whom she called were unavailable. Lane then drove to the police station as she requested, but was turned away by the arresting officer because Louis was in the booking process.

Lane resigned from the New Mexico House in March 2024.

New Mexico House of Representatives
Preceded by James G. Townsend	Minority Leader of the New Mexico House of Representatives; 2023–2024	Succeeded by James G. Townsend; Acting
