= C. Gene Samberson =

American politician (1934–2025)

Member of the New Mexico House of Representatives
- In office 1970–1988

Speaker of the New Mexico House of Representatives
- In office 1979–1982
- Preceded by: Walter K. Martinez
- Succeeded by: Raymond G. Sanchez
- In office 1985–1987
- Preceded by: Raymond G. Sanchez
- Succeeded by: Raymond G. Sanchez

Personal details
- Born: Charles Gene Samberson; July 11, 1934 Hobbs, New Mexico, U.S.
- Died: September 20, 2025 (aged 91)
- Party: Democratic
- Education: University of New Mexico

Charles Gene Samberson (July 11, 1934 – September 20, 2025) was an American politician. He served as a Democratic member of the New Mexico House of Representatives.

== Life and career ==
Samberson was born in Hobbs, New Mexico, on July 11, 1934. He attended the University of New Mexico.

He was a Lovington attorney.

Samberson served in the New Mexico House of Representatives from 1970 to 1988.

Samberson died on September 20, 2025, at the age of 91.
