= 2002 New Mexico gubernatorial election =

- November 5, 2002
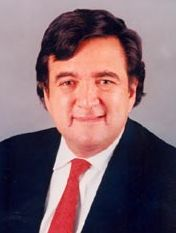

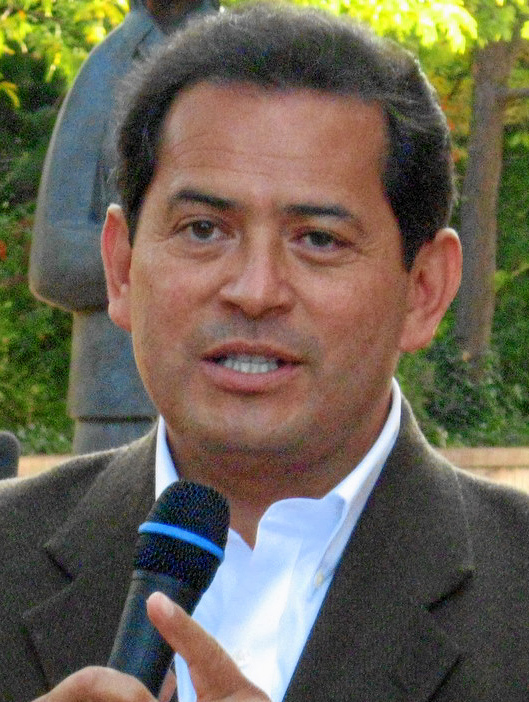

Nominee	Bill Richardson	John Sanchez	David E. Bacon
Party	Democratic	Republican	Green
Running mate	Diane Denish	Rod Adair	Kathleen M. Sanchez
Popular vote	268,693	189,074	26,466
Percentage	55.49%	39.05%	5.47%
- County results Richardson: 40–50% 50–60% 60–70% 70–80% Sanchez: 40–50% 50–60% 60–70%
Governor before election
Gary Johnson
Republican
Elected Governor
Bill Richardson
Democratic

The 2002 New Mexico gubernatorial election was a race for the Governor of New Mexico. The winner of the election held on November 5, 2002, served from January 1, 2003, until January 1, 2007. Incumbent Republican Gary Johnson was term limited. Former U.S. Congressman Bill Richardson won the election. Green Party nominee David Bacon received over 5% of the total vote, including over 11% in Santa Fe County, which was his best showing.

== Primary election ==
=== Democratic party ===
==== Candidates ====
- Bill Richardson, former United States Secretary of Energy, former United States Ambassador to the United Nations and former U.S. Representative
- Mike Nalley (write-in)

==== Results ====
Democratic primary results
Party	Candidate	Votes	%
Democratic	Bill Richardson	147,524	99.80%
Democratic	Mike Nalley (write-in)	294	0.20%
Total votes		147,818	100.00%

=== Republican party ===
==== Candidates ====
- Gilbert S. Baca, State Representative
- Robert M. Burpo, State Senator
- Walter D. Bradley, Lieutenant Governor
- John A. Sanchez, State Representative

==== Results ====
Republican primary results
Party	Candidate	Votes	%
Republican	John A. Sanchez	55,102	58.53%
Republican	Walter D. Bradley	33,206	35.27%
Republican	Robert M. Burpo	3,864	4.10%
Republican	Gilbert S. Baca	1,979	2.10%
Total votes		94,151	100.00%

== General election ==
=== Candidates ===
- Bill Richardson (D), former United States Secretary of Energy, former United States Ambassador to the United Nations and former U.S. Representative
- John Sanchez (R), State Representative
- David Bacon (G)

=== Predictions ===
Source	Ranking	As of
The Cook Political Report	Likely D (flip)	October 31, 2002
Sabato's Crystal Ball	Likely D (flip)	November 4, 2002

=== Results ===
2002 New Mexico gubernatorial election
Party	Candidate	Votes	%	±%
Democratic	Bill Richardson	268,693	55.49%	+10.02%
Republican	John A. Sanchez	189,074	39.05%	−15.48%
Green	David E. Bacon	26,466	5.47%	
Majority		79,619	16.44%	
Total votes		484,233	100.00%	
Democratic gain from Republican		Swing	+25.50%	

=== Results by county ===
County	Bill Richardson Democratic		John A. Sanchez Republican		David E. Bacon Green		Margin		Total votes cast
County	#	%	#	%	#	%	#	%	Total votes cast
Bernalillo	87,295	54.17%	63,853	39.62%	10,006	6.21%	23,442	14.55%	161,154
Catron	499	30.13%	1,069	64.55%	88	5.31%	-570	-34.42%	1,656
Chaves	6,584	44.53%	7,802	52.77%	400	2.71%	-1,218	-8.24%	14,786
Cibola	3,699	66.95%	1,688	30.55%	138	2.50%	2,011	36.40%	5,525
Colfax	2,926	63.02%	1,569	33.79%	148	3.19%	1,357	29.23%	4,643
Curry	4,851	52.16%	4,182	44.96%	268	2.88%	669	7.19%	9,301
De Baca	455	52.91%	389	45.23%	16	1.86%	66	7.67%	860
Doña Ana	20,153	57.81%	13,392	38.42%	1,315	3.77%	6,761	19.39%	34,860
Eddy	6,758	48.36%	6,844	48.97%	373	2.67%	-86	-0.62%	13,975
Grant	4,947	56.71%	3,179	36.44%	598	6.85%	1,768	20.27%	8,724
Guadalupe	1,283	67.85%	578	30.57%	30	1.59%	705	37.28%	1,891
Harding	356	57.51%	253	40.87%	10	1.62%	103	16.64%	619
Hidalgo	1,098	62.81%	609	34.84%	41	2.35%	489	27.97%	1,748
Lea	5,848	48.69%	5,845	48.67%	317	2.64%	3	0.02%	12,010
Lincoln	2,575	41.97%	3,303	53.84%	257	4.19%	-728	-11.87%	6,135
Los Alamos	3,612	43.88%	4,097	49.77%	523	6.35%	-485	-5.89%	8,232
Luna	3,090	55.49%	2,259	40.56%	220	3.95%	831	14.92%	5,569
McKinley	10,137	74.94%	2,970	21.96%	420	3.10%	7,167	52.98%	13,527
Mora	1,604	69.92%	622	27.11%	68	2.96%	982	42.81%	2,294
Otero	5,911	42.34%	7,605	54.48%	444	3.18%	-1,694	-12.13%	13,960
Quay	2,149	61.33%	1,267	36.16%	88	2.51%	882	25.17%	3,504
Rio Arriba	7,281	70.48%	2,608	25.25%	441	4.27%	4,673	45.24%	10,330
Roosevelt	2,241	51.72%	1,943	44.84%	149	3.44%	298	6.88%	4,333
San Juan	12,765	45.36%	14,237	50.59%	1,142	4.06%	-1,472	-5.23%	28,144
San Miguel	5,910	75.30%	1,577	20.09%	362	4.61%	4,333	55.20%	7,849
Sandoval	14,037	53.82%	10,556	40.47%	1,490	5.71%	3,481	13.35%	26,083
Santa Fe	26,803	65.87%	9,132	22.44%	4,754	11.68%	17,671	43.43%	40,689
Sierra	1,873	45.62%	2,001	48.73%	232	5.65%	-128	-3.12%	4,106
Socorro	3,492	58.82%	2,157	36.33%	288	4.85%	1,335	22.49%	5,937
Taos	6,472	68.71%	2,073	22.01%	874	9.28%	4,399	46.70%	9,419
Torrance	1,944	46.37%	2,004	47.81%	244	5.82%	-60	-1.43%	4,192
Union	831	52.26%	731	45.97%	28	1.76%	100	6.29%	1,590
Valencia	9,214	55.55%	6,680	40.27%	694	4.18%	2,534	15.28%	16,588
Total	268,693	55.49%	189,074	39.05%	26,466	5.47%	79,619	16.44%	484,233

==== Counties that flipped from Republican to Democratic ====
- Bernalillo (largest city: Albuquerque)
- Colfax (largest city: Raton)
- Curry (largest village: Clovis)
- De Baca (largest city: Fort Sumner)
- Harding (largest city: Roy)
- Hidalgo (largest city: Lordsburg)
- Lea (largest city: Hobbs)
- Luna (largest city: Deming)
- Quay (largest city: Tucumcari)
- Roosevelt (largest city: Portales)
- Sandoval (largest city: Rancho)
- Union (largest city: Clayton)
- Valencia (largest village: Los Lunas)
