= Dianne Hamilton =

American politician (1934–2021)

Member of the New Mexico House of Representatives from the 38th district
- In office January 1, 1999 – January 1, 2017
- Preceded by: Murray Ryan
- Succeeded by: Rebecca Dow

Personal details
- Born: January 31, 1934 Kansas City, Missouri, U.S.
- Died: November 9, 2021 (aged 87) Tijeras, New Mexico, U.S.
- Party: Republican
- Education: University of Kansas (BS)

F. Dianne Miller Hamilton (January 31, 1934 – November 9, 2021) was an American politician who served as a Republican member of the New Mexico House of Representatives who represented District 38 from 1999 to 2017. Citing health reasons, Hamilton announced in February 2016 that she would not seek reelection that November and retire at the end of the term.

She died on November 9, 2021, in Tijeras, New Mexico, at age 87.

== Education ==
Hamilton earned her BS in education from University of Kansas.

== Elections ==
- 1998 When District 38 Republican Representative Murray Ryan retired and left the seat open, Hamilton was unopposed for the June 2, 1998 Republican Primary and won the November 3, 1998 General election by 20 votes with 2,227 votes (50.2%) against Democratic nominee Librado Maldonado; Ryan had held the seat from 1969 until 1998.
- 2000 Hamilton was unopposed for both the 2000 Republican Primary, winning with 542 votes and the November 7, 2000 General election, winning with 3,680 votes.
- 2002 Hamilton was unopposed for the 2002 Republican Primary, winning with 591 votes and won the November 5, 2002 General election with 2,165 votes (61.2%) against Democratic nominee Gary Whitehead.
- 2004 Hamilton was unopposed for both the June 1, 2004 Republican Primary, winning with 902 votes and the November 2, 2004 General election, winning with 7,409 votes.
- 2006 Hamilton was unopposed for both the June 6, 2006 Republican Primary, winning with 1,303 votes and the November 7, 2006 General election, winning with 6,349 votes.
- 2008 Hamilton was unopposed for the June 8, 2008 Republican Primary, winning with 1,858 votes and the November 4, 2008 General election, winning with 7,754 votes.
- 2010 Hamilton was challenged in the June 1, 2010 Republican Primary, winning with 1,548 votes (68.8%) and was unopposed for the November 2, 2010 General election, winning with 6,384 votes.
- 2014 Hamilton was again unopposed in the Republican primary. She easily defeated Terry Fortenberry in the general election, earning 5,593 votes (57.8%) to his 4,087 (42.2%).
- 2012 Hamilton was unopposed for the June 5, 2012 Republican Primary, winning with 1,753 votes and won the November 6, 2012 General election with 7,183 votes (54.9%) against Democratic nominee Terry Fortenberry.
