= Art De La Cruz =

American politician

Member of the New Mexico House of Representatives from the 12th district
- Incumbent
- Assumed office February 3, 2022
- Preceded by: Brittney Barreras
- In office September 9, 2020 – January 19, 2021
- Preceded by: Patricio Ruiloba
- Succeeded by: Brittney Barreras

Personal details
- Born: Albuquerque, New Mexico, U.S.
- Party: Democratic
- Education: University of New Mexico (BA); University of Phoenix (MS)

Art De La Cruz is an American politician serving as a member of the New Mexico House of Representatives from the 12th district. Appointed on February 3, 2022, De La Cruz previously represented the same district from September 2020 to January 2021.

== Early life and education ==
Born in Albuquerque, New Mexico, De La Cruz earned a Bachelor of Arts degree in university studies from the University of New Mexico and a Master of Science in management and human relations from the University of Phoenix.

== Career ==
De La Cruz served as an employee of the Public Employees Retirement Association of New Mexico for 46 years. He has also operated a small business. In September 2020, De La Cruz was appointed to the New Mexico House of Representatives after the resignation of Patricio Ruiloba. In the 2020 election for the seat, De La Cruz was a Democratic write-in candidate, losing to independent candidate Brittney Barreras. He left office on January 19, 2021.

On January 28, 2022, Barreras announced her resignation from the House of Representatives. On February 2, 2022, De La Cruz was appointed by the Bernalillo County commission to fill Barreras' position. He was sworn in on February 3, 2022.
