= Linda Garcia Benavides =

American politician from New Mexico

Member of the New Mexico House of Representatives from the 17th district
- In office September 7, 2022 – December 31, 2022
- Preceded by: Deborah Armstrong
- Succeeded by: Dayan Hochman-Vigil (Redistricting)

Personal details
- Party: Democratic

Linda Garcia Benavides is an American politician who served as a member of the New Mexico House of Representatives for the 17th district from September to December 2022. She was appointed to the position by the Bernalillo County Board of Commissioners in September 2022, succeeding Deborah A. Armstrong.

== Career ==
For 24 years, Benavides worked for Sandia National Laboratories. She was also a member of the executive board of the New Mexico Hispanic Heritage Committee. On September 7, 2022, she was appointed to the New Mexico House of Representatives by members of the Bernalillo County Board of Commissioners, succeeding Deborah A. Armstrong.
