= Cathrynn Brown =

Republican member of the New Mexico House of Representatives

Member of the New Mexico House of Representatives from the 55th district
- Incumbent
- Assumed office January 18, 2011
- Preceded by: John Heaton

Personal details
- Party: Republican
- Profession: Attorney
- Website: cathrynnbrown.com

Cathrynn N. Brown is an American politician and a Republican member of the New Mexico House of Representatives representing District 55 since January 18, 2011.

== Elections ==
- 2012 Brown was unopposed for both the June 5, 2012 Republican Primary, winning with 1,538 votes and the November 6, 2012 General election, winning with 8,853 votes after a challenger withdrew.
- 2008 To challenge District 55 incumbent Democratic Representative John Heaton, Autry Reese was unopposed for the June 8, 2008 Republican Primary; after Reese withdrew, Brown was included on the November 4, 2008 General election ballot but lost to Representative Heaton.
- 2010 Brown and Representative Heaton were both unopposed for both their June 1, 2010 primaries, setting up a rematch; Brown won the November 2, 2010 General election with 4,010 votes (52.2%) against Representative Heaton.

== Political positions ==
In January 2021, shortly before a mob of Trump supporters stormed the Capitol, Brown announced legislation to decertify Joe Biden's victory in New Mexico by removing the state's five electoral votes he won. In a statement, Brown made baseless claims of election fraud, alleging fraud occurred in New Mexico and in other states. She claimed the final vote tallies had been "manipulated" but offered no evidence.
