= Sarah Boses =

American politician

Member-elect of the New Mexico House of Representatives from the 50th district
- Assuming office January 2027
- Succeeding: Matthew McQueen

Personal details
- Party: Democratic

Sarah Boses is an American politician. A member of the Democratic Party, she is the member-elect for the 50th district of the New Mexico House of Representatives.
