= Danice Picraux =

American politician

Member of the New Mexico House of Representatives from the 25th district
- In office January 1, 1991 – January 1, 2013
- Preceded by: Christine Trujillo

Personal details
- Party: Democratic

Danice Picraux is an American politician who served in the New Mexico House of Representatives from the 25th district from 1991 to 2013.
