= Solomon Peña =

Orchestrator of shootings at political opponents

- Born: April 1983 (age 43); California, U.S.
- Education: University of New Mexico
- Political party: Republican
- Status: Incarcerated at USP Atwater
- Criminal charges: Receipt, transportation or possession of a firearm or destructive device by certain persons; Shooting at dwelling or occupied building (no great bodily harm); Shooting at or from a motor vehicle (no great bodily harm); Aggravated assault (deadly weapon); Conspiracy to commit a felony; Unlawful criminal solicitation
- Penalty: 80 years in prison

Details
- Victims: Adriann Barboa; Javier Martínez; Debbie O'Malley; Linda M. Lopez; Possible other victims: Raúl Torrez; Moe Maestas
- Date: December 4, 2022; January 3 or 5, 2023
- State: New Mexico
- Target: Local Democratic politicians
- Website: https://solomonpena.com/

Solomon Peña (Note: Spelt as Peña by most media sources, but spelled by him and his campaign as Pena) (born April 1983) is an American political candidate who was the Republican nominee for the 14th district of the New Mexico House of Representatives in 2022. He attracted national attention when he was arrested on January 16, 2023, for hiring men to shoot at various Democratic politicians in response to his loss in the November election, for which he was convicted in March 2025. On August 13, 2025, Peña was sentenced to 80 years in prison.

== Early life ==
Peña was born in April 1983 in California. He was raised in New Mexico, graduating from Highland High School in Albuquerque in 2001. According to his campaign site, he served in the 3rd Marine Division as a U.S. Navy Hospital Corpsman in Okinawa, Japan; however, this has not been verified.

In 2008, Peña was sentenced to seven years in prison for stealing large amounts of electronics and other goods from at least four Albuquerque retail stores, including a Kmart, as part of a wider smash and grab scheme. He started his sentence in May 2009.

He was embroiled in another legal dispute in 2010 while in prison, when he was fired from his job as a prison cook due to a physical altercation in which he gouged at an inmate's eyes after he threw butter at Peña and headbutted him. Peña sued prison authorities, claiming that his firing was a violation of his constitutional rights, writing that "prison authorities want the prisoners to be stupid, uneducated and uninformed (and drug-addicted) so they can do whatever they want to the prisoners.". The judge dismissed his lawsuit. This lawsuit was one of many that Peña filed against GEO Group, the company that ran at least one of the prisons he was incarcerated in, of which most were dismissed by the courts. He was released in March 2016, after which he obtained an undergraduate degree in political science from the University of New Mexico in 2021. In March 2021, his five-year probation ceased, and he subsequently had his voting rights restored in April. In 2022, he listed himself as a sales representative for A Reliable Roof LLC, a local Albuquerque roofing contractor.

In 2017, Peña worked at a Melloy dealership as a car salesman, selling two cars before being fired for being late on three separate occasions.

He was detained briefly in March 2018 for being in a car with his brother Daniel Peña, who was a wanted fugitive at the time.

In September 2019, a former business partner informed police that Peña has made several verbal threats directed towards him. Peña reportedly refused to pay him on multiple occasions and would remark to the man that "I will turn on you" and "I will do anything I can to damage you."

Peña is a supporter of current president Donald Trump, having been photographed at various Trump rallies and entertained his claims of voter fraud in the 2020 presidential election. Evidence from various online videos of the event indicate that he attended Trump's Stop the Steal rally at the United States Capitol on January 6, 2021, though there is no evidence he participated in the eventual breach of the building. He is a registered Republican, having voted four times in previous elections. At the time of his arrest, neighbors remarked that he would often squabble with them if they had political disagreements. He was known to install banners criticizing president Joe Biden in his lawn, including one that stated "Fuck Joe Biden" that the local homeowner's association ordered him to take down about a year before his arrest.

Peña was also a follower of the LaRouche movement, having donated over $5,000 to their political action committee LaRouchePAC and having tabled for the group at a Trump rally in Pennsylvania. In his resume, Peña included a link to a LaRouche manifesto.

== 2022 New Mexico House of Representatives elections ==
Peña ran against Democratic incumbent Miguel Garcia as the Republican nominee in the election for House representative of New Mexico's 14th house district during the 2022 midterm elections. Before the election, Democrats attempted to disqualify Peña, citing his extensive criminal history, with Garcia filing a lawsuit against him. Peña received aid from fellow New Mexico Republicans, who knew of the difficulties of running in a historically uncontested district (Garcia had first won the position of representative of New Mexico's 14th house district in 1998). Janice Arnold-Jones, former representative for New Mexico's 24th state house district, described Peña as being "entirely green" as a politician, reporting that Peña told her that he would win based on positive reactions during door-to-door canvassing.

Solomon Pena for NM
(@SolomonPena2022)
tweeted:

Trump just announced for 2024. I stand with him. I never conceded my HD 14 race. Now researching my options.

November 15, 2022

Garcia defeated Peña with 73.6% of the vote and a 3,600 vote difference. Peña alleged that the election was rigged and reportedly arrived at the houses of elected officials with papers that supposedly proved his victory. Upon hearing of Donald Trump's announcement of his 2024 bid for reelection, Peña stated that he stood by Trump and that he was considering his "own options," in regard to him not conceding his defeat to Garcia. Peña made various inflammatory remarks on his Twitter account, including once calling New Mexico state house representative Rebecca Dow "a prostitute," calling a female user on the site "ugly," and telling then federal house representative-elect Gabe Vasquez to "get the fuk [sic] outta here," upon Vasquez proclaiming victory in the November election.

== Shootings ==
Between December 4, 2022, and January 3, 2023, several drive-by shootings occurred in which the homes of various Democratic politicians were subject to gunfire. Police state that four of these have been confirmed to be linked to Peña. Peña is said to have conspired with four other men in the attacks, promising them pay. Peña in one incident allegedly personally "pulled the trigger," from an AR-15, though his assault rifle malfunctioned. As of January 18, he was linked to Jose Louis Trujillo, who had been one of Peña's largest campaign donors during the November election, his father Demetrio Trujillo, as well as "two brothers."

According to a confidential witness who claimed to have knowledge of the conspiracy, the shooters were initially instructed to aim above the windows to purposely avoid striking anyone; however, Peña later wanted shooters to be more aggressive. He reportedly disliked how late shooters would attack, since the occupants of the houses would likely be asleep by that time, and instructed them to come around 8 pm MST when they would be awake. This reportedly made the shooters uneasy as they knew that this would increase the chance that their shootings would cause serious injury or death.

=== Connected shootings ===
On December 4, 2022, at 4:41 pm MST, an unidentified individual fired eight rounds at the house of Bernalillo County commissioner Adriann Barboa in southeast Albuquerque. Barboa's front door and windows were shot at four times. Barboa was out Christmas shopping at the time, later remarking that "it was terrifying". Due to other victims being people of color, she later speculated that the attacks were racially motivated. Barboa was one of the elected officials Peña had come to after the election to show his proof of victory.

Days after the Barboa shooting on December 8, the house of Javier Martínez, representative of New Mexico's 11th house district and majority leader of the New Mexican house of representatives, was shot at by an unidentified individual. Martínez claimed to have heard the news regarding the other shootings, upon which he investigated his house, having previously heard gunshots in his area in early December. Martínez then proceeded to find damage inflicted by gunshots.

On December 11, outgoing Bernalillo county commissioner Debbie O'Malley was targeted. According to O'Malley, the adobe fencing of her house was damaged by gunfire, and a dozen gunshot impacts were identified on the walls and the house. O'Malley informed police and while they were investigating, she recalled that Peña had arrived at her house "a day or two" before the shooting to express his anger at not winning and complain about the election results. A Ring home security video obtained by CNN shows Peña with papers arriving at O'Malley's former residence on December 10, one day before the shooting, where the new owner subsequently directs him to O'Malley's new residence. Additionally, video surveillance from O'Malley's home showed Peña driving by her house in a 2022 black Audi, the same car that a witness stated was speeding away from the area around the house on the day of the attack.

According to police, the last shooting occurred at the house of New Mexico senator Linda M. Lopez on January 3, 2023, in southwest Albuquerque. Lopez and her children were awakened to the firing of eight shots at their home after midnight; she initially dismissed the loud bangs as fireworks. Three gunshots were fired into her 10-year-old daughter's room, who according to Lopez, believed that a spider was on her face and had woken her up, in addition to feeling that sand was in her bed. The "sand" was sheetrock dust that had been blown onto her face from the three shots. Two shots entered Lopez' room and in total 12 impacts were discovered. Police were dispatched around 1am based on a ShotSpotter activation. Lopez only realized that her house had been the target of a shooting the following morning.

=== Other potentially linked shootings ===
In addition to the previous shootings, police were also investigating two additional shootings against elected officials. Police have announced that they haven't been able to definitively connect them with Peña.

Early in the morning of December 10, multiple shots were detected in the vicinity of the now current New Mexico Attorney General Raúl Torrez's former campaign office in Albuquerque. By that time, Torrez had already moved out of said office, however, the Albuquerque Police Department's (APD) ShotSpotter system detected multiple gunshots in the area. Police studied the scene and investigated it as part of the wider series of shootings.

At 11:41 MST on January 5, the APD's ShotSpotter system detected three gunshots in the area of a law office in Downtown Albuquerque where New Mexico senator Moe Maestas works. No damage to the building was discovered, nor was anyone injured.

== Investigation and arrest ==
Police investigated all cases collectively. The FBI and New Mexico State Police were involved in the investigation.

Approximately 40 minutes after the shooting at Linda Lopez' house on January 3, police arrested 21-year-old Jose Trujillo at a traffic stop around four miles away from Lopez' residence. Shell casings at Lopez' house were found to match that of a handgun possessed by Trujillo. Trujillo was detained for an unrelated felony charge, upon which police searched his car, unveiling what was believed to be 800 pills of fentanyl, as well as numerous firearms and the fact the silver Nissan Maxima he was driving was owned by Peña.

A week prior to Peña's arrest, police announced that they had taken in a suspect in relation to the shootings and had obtained a firearm in relation to the shootings.

On January 16, 2023, Peña was arrested after SWAT officers raided his home. Police stated that they were able to track Peña via text messages he sent to the shooters, informing them of the addresses of the homes of the individuals and also the cash that he granted to them. One of his text messages included a message from the book Stuffing the Ballot Box, a 2002 academic study regarding fraud and electoral reform in Costa Rica: "It was only the additional incentive of a threat of civil war that empowered a president to complete the reformist project," which was seen an expression regarding the idea of an upcoming civil war within the United States. Albuquerque Police Chief Harold Medina described Peña as the mastermind behind a conspiracy behind the shootings. He was charged with "receipt, transportation or possession of a firearm or destructive device by certain persons," shooting at dwelling or occupied building without great bodily harm, shooting at or from a motor vehicle without great bodily harm, aggravated assault with a deadly weapon, conspiracy to commit a felony, and unlawful criminal solicitation. Chief Medina suggested that he may face additional charges, stating that "we continue to peel off layers, like an onion."

On January 18, Police disclosed that Jose Trujillo and his father were believed to have conspired with Peña, as well as "two brothers." Peña made his first court appearance on January 18, being held without bail. He was detained before and throughout the trial.

On March 19, 2025, Peña was found guilty of all 13 charges against him, including conspiracy, weapons-related charges and interference with federally protected activities.

On August 13, 2025, Peña was sentenced to 80 years in prison with 3 years of supervised release.

== Reactions ==
The incident was frequently compared to the attack on Paul Pelosi that took place a few months prior.

The New Mexico Republican Party condemned Peña, stating that "if Peña is found guilty, he must be prosecuted to the full extent of the law." Greg Baca, the state senate Republican leader, described it as a "heinous attack," stating that "he and his co-conspirators deserve to be prosecuted to the fullest extent of the law." Republican House leader Ryan Lane stated on January 18 that "this is yet another example of a convicted felon unlawfully gaining access to firearms, which they are barred from owning or possessing, and using the weapon in a manner that causes public harm."

== See also ==
- Gretchen Whitmer kidnapping plot
- October 2018 United States mail bombing attempts
- Attempts to overturn the 2020 United States presidential election
  - 2020–21 United States election protests
    - January 6 United States Capitol attack
- 2022–2023 Brazilian election protests
  - 2023 invasion of the Brazilian Congress
- Congressional baseball shooting
