= Nate Gentry =

American politician (born 1975/76)

Minority Leader of the New Mexico House of Representatives
- In office January 17, 2017 – January 15, 2019
- Preceded by: Brian Egolf
- Succeeded by: Jim Townsend

Member of the New Mexico House of Representatives from the 30th district
- In office January 18, 2011 – January 15, 2019
- Preceded by: Karen Giannini
- Succeeded by: Natalie Figueroa

Personal details
- Born: 1975 or 1976 (age 50–51)
- Party: Republican
- Education: Rhodes College (BA); University of New Mexico (JD)
- Website: Campaign website

Nathaniel Gentry (born 1975 or 1976) is an American lawmaker and former Republican member of the New Mexico House of Representatives representing District 30 from January 18, 2011, to January 21, 2019. He was a principal figure in the GOP takeover of the New Mexico State House in 2014, resulting in his election as the first Republican Majority Floor Leader in over 60 years. After Democrats regained control of the chamber in 2016, he was elected by the Republican Caucus as the House Minority Leader.

== Education ==
Gentry earned his BA from Rhodes College in 1998 and his JD from the University of New Mexico School of Law in 2003.

== Elections ==
- 2016 Gentry was unopposed for the June 7, 2016 Republican Primary, winning with 1,593 votes and won the November 8, 2016 General Election with 6,841 votes (52.19%) against Democratic nominee Natalie R. Figueroa.
- 2014 Gentry was unopposed for the June 3, 2014 Republican Primary, winning with 1,257 votes and won the November 3, 2014 General election with 4,760 (54.34%) against Democratic nominee Robert M. Coffey Jr.
- 2012 Gentry was unopposed for the June 5, 2012 Republican Primary, winning with 1,659 votes and won the November 6, 2012 General election with 6,997 votes (53.9%) against Democratic nominee Maryellen Broderick.
- 2010 To challenge incumbent District 30 Democratic Representative Karen Giannini, Gentry was unopposed for the June 1, 2010 Republican Primary, winning with 2,015 votes (54.2%) against Representative Vaughn, and won the November 2, 2010 General election with 5,634 votes (58.1%) against Representative Giannini.

New Mexico House of Representatives
Preceded by Brian Egolf	Minority Leader of the New Mexico House of Representatives; 2017–2019	Succeeded by Jim Townsend
