= John Sanchez =

American politician (born 1963)

John Sánchez
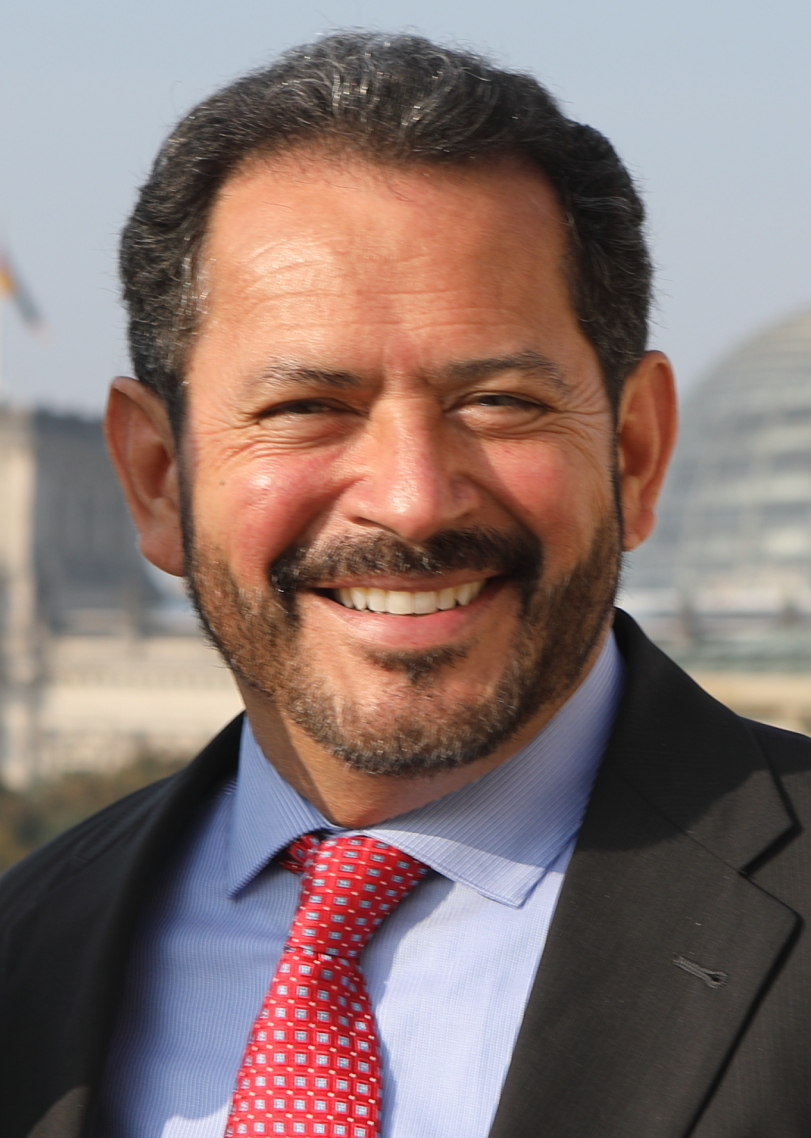

29th Lieutenant Governor of New Mexico
- In office January 1, 2011 – January 1, 2019
- Governor: Susana Martinez
- Preceded by: Diane Denish
- Succeeded by: Howie Morales

Member of the New Mexico House of Representatives from the 15th district
- In office January 1, 2001 – January 1, 2003
- Preceded by: Raymond Sanchez
- Succeeded by: Teresa Zanetti

Personal details
- Born: January 11, 1963 (age 63) Albuquerque, New Mexico, U.S.
- Party: Republican
- Spouse: Debra Sánchez

John A. Sánchez (born January 11, 1963) is an American businessman and politician who served as the 29th lieutenant governor of New Mexico from 2011 to 2019.

== Early life ==
Sanchez, the youngest of eight children, was born and raised in North Valley, New Mexico. Sanchez's great-great grandfather was a territorial legislator in 1860, and his grandfather served as a state representative in 1930.

== Career ==
In 1997, Sanchez was elected Trustee for the Village of Los Ranchos.

Sanchez, a one-time flight attendant and real estate agent, started Right Way Roofing, a small business in Albuquerque, after high school. In 1993, Right Way Roofing was named Small Business of the Year by the Albuquerque Hispano Chamber of Commerce.

=== New Mexico House of Representatives ===
==== 2000 election ====
Sanchez was elected to the New Mexico House of Representatives, defeating 30-year incumbent and Speaker of the House Raymond Sanchez, 51%-49%, a difference of just 206 votes.

==== Tenure ====
Sanchez only served one term, representing Bernalillo County.

He proposed significant education reform that included vouchers for charter schools.

In 2001, he sponsored a bill that would create term limits for the New Mexico Legislature.

==== Committee assignments ====
- Appropriations & Finance
- Business & Industry
- Consumer & Public Affairs
- Education Reforms
- Judiciary
- Labor & Human Resources
- Taxation & Revenue

== Political campaigns ==
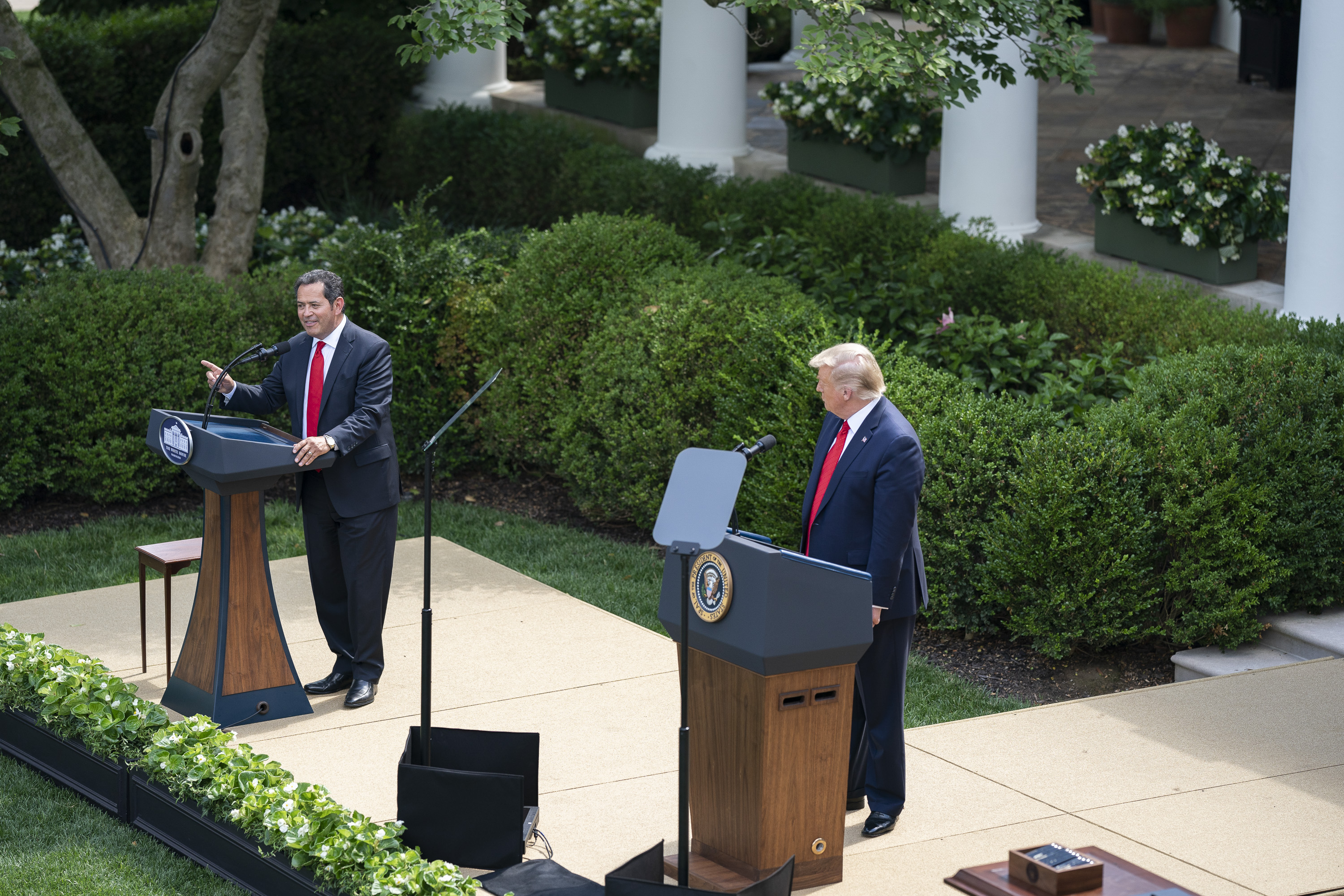
President Donald Trump listens as Sanchez delivers remarks in the Rose Garden of the White House, 2020

=== 2002 gubernatorial election ===
On June 5, 2002, Sanchez received 59% of the vote in a four-way Republican primary election for Governor of New Mexico.

Sanchez was defeated in the general election by Democratic gubernatorial nominee Bill Richardson (55% to 39%).

=== 2010 gubernatorial election ===
On June 1, 2010, Sanchez received 39.6% of the vote in a three-way Republican primary election for Lieutenant Governor of New Mexico.

On November 2, 2010, Susana Martinez and John Sanchez were elected in the general election by a margin of 53% to 47%.

=== 2012 U.S. Senate election ===
On May 24, 2011, Sanchez announced his candidacy for the United States Senate seat being vacated by Democratic Senator Jeff Bingaman in 2012.

Also on May 24, 2011, Governor of New Mexico Susana Martinez stated that she would restrict Sanchez's activities to only those required by the Constitution of the State of New Mexico. In a press release, the Governor stated, "To prevent this race from becoming a distraction, Lt. Governor Sanchez will not be given responsibilities in my administration beyond the select few provided for in the state Constitution."

Following the June 30, 2011 Federal Election Commission deadline, the Sanchez campaign reported having raised $312,000 during the period. Of that amount, Sanchez loaned himself $200,000. He raised a total of $126,000 from 78 individuals and six Limited liability company (LLCs).

The FEC sent the Sanchez campaign a letter indicating that his July Quarterly Report included "one or more contributions that appear to exceed the limits" of federal law. Sanchez accepted two donations from a Limited Liability Company in addition to donations from the LLC's owner.

Sanchez's campaign raised $164,059.79 in contributions other than loans during the third quarter, compared to $231,144.00 raised by Greg Sowards and $532,228.18 raised by Heather Wilson. New Mexico political blogger Heath Haussamen concluded that Sanchez "hasn’t proven that he can raise or spend the money to compete." National Journal included Sanchez in its "Losers" section for Senate fundraising during the quarter. Sanchez latest disclosure shows that his campaign has raised a net of $31,293 ($248,898 latest cash on hand; $217,605 debts owed), compared to Sowards' -$366,869 ($496,732 cash on hand; $863,601 debts owed) and Wilson's $952,898 ($952,898 cash on hand; $0 debts owed).

The Sanchez campaign received an endorsement from U.S. Senator Rand Paul in late September 2011. Paul's endorsement was announced quickly after Sanchez's primary election opponent, Greg Sowards, announced his own endorsement from Tea Party icon and former Nevada U.S. Senate candidate Sharron Angle.

Sanchez withdrew his Senate bid on February 9, 2012.

=== 2014 gubernatorial election ===
On November 4, 2014, Governor Susana Martinez and Sanchez won re-election against the Democratic ticket of Gary King and his running mate Deb Haaland.

== Electoral history ==
New Mexico House of Representatives 15th District Election, 2000
Party	Candidate	Votes	%
Republican	John Sanchez	5,083	51
Democratic	Raymond Sanchez (inc.)	4,877	49

New Mexico Governor Republican Primary Election, 2002
Party	Candidate	Votes	%
Republican	John Sanchez	55,102	58.53
Republican	Walter Bradley	33,206	35.27
Republican	Robert Burpo	3,864	4.10
Republican	Gilbert Baca	1,979	2.10

New Mexico Governor Election, 2002
Party	Candidate	Votes	%
Democratic	Bill Richardson	268,693	55.49
Republican	John Sanchez	189,074	39.05
Green	David Bacon	26,465	5.47

New Mexico Lieutenant Governor Republican Primary Election, 2010
Party	Candidate	Votes	%
Republican	John Sanchez	46,129	39.64
Republican	Kent Cravens	36,346	31.23
Republican	Brian Moore	33,899	29.13

== See also ==
- List of minority governors and lieutenant governors in the United States

Party political offices
Preceded by Gary Johnson	Republican nominee for Governor of New Mexico; 2002	Succeeded by John Dendahl
Political offices
Preceded by Diane Denish	Lieutenant Governor of New Mexico; 2011–2019	Succeeded by Howie Morales
