= Joanne Ferrary =

American politician

Member of the New Mexico House of Representatives from the 37th district
- In office January 1, 2017 – July 27, 2026
- Preceded by: Terry McMillan
- Succeeded by: Lori Martinez

Personal details
- Born: July 20, 1953 (age 73) Ohio, U.S.
- Party: Democratic
- Education: University of New Mexico (BA, MBA)

Military service
- Branch/service: United States Air Force

Joanne J. Ferrary (born July 20, 1953) is an American politician who served in the New Mexico House of Representatives, representing the 37th district from 2017 to 2026.

== Early life and education ==
Ferrary was born in Ohio and raised in New Mexico. She earned a Bachelor of Arts degree from the University of New Mexico and a Master of Business Administration from the University of New Mexico Anderson School of Management.

== Career ==
Prior to entering politics, Ferrary served in the United States Air Force and owned a small business. From 1990 to 1996, she served as the planning director of the New Mexico Department of Transportation Traffic Safety Bureau. She also served as a member of the Las Cruces Planning and Zoning Commission. She was elected to the New Mexico House of Representatives in November 2016 and assumed office in January 2017.

In January 2026, Ferrary announced that she would not seek reelection that year. During that year's legislative session, she supported legislation for medical malpractice reform, as well as seeking to introduce a 'Green amendment' within New Mexico, though these plans were later pulled. She resigned from the chamber in July 2026 with the aim of giving the winner of the Democratic primary for her seat an earlier start in the legislature.
