= Conrad James =

American politician (born 1974)

Member of the New Mexico House of Representatives from the 24th district
- In office January 5, 2015 – January 5, 2017
- Preceded by: Elizabeth Thomson
- Succeeded by: Elizabeth Thomson
- In office January 5, 2011 – January 5, 2013
- Preceded by: Janice Arnold-Jones
- Succeeded by: Elizabeth Thomson

Personal details
- Born: 1974 (age 51–52) Columbus, Ohio, U.S.
- Party: Republican
- Spouse: Natasha James
- Education: University of Notre Dame, Cornell University
- Profession: scientist
- Website: VoteForConradJames.com

Conrad D. James (born 1974) is a politician and scientist from Albuquerque, New Mexico, and a member of the Republican Party.

== Early life and education ==
James was born in Columbus, Ohio, where he graduated from Walnut Ridge High School. He received a B.A. summa cum laude in electrical engineering from the University of Notre Dame in 1996. He went on to earn a M.S. (1999) and Ph.D. (2002) from Cornell University in applied and engineering physics. His doctoral dissertation focused on the fabrication of microelectrode arrays to monitor the electrical activity of in vitro neural networks as a function of network architecture.

== Career ==
=== Sandia National Laboratories ===
Since 2002, James has been employed as a researcher at the Sandia National Laboratories, where he develops biosensors. His work has included research into how immune cells respond to pathogens in the first minutes of exposure and investigating the performance of engineered neural networks. James' research has been published in Journal of Fluid Engineering, Applied Physics Letters, Neurochemical Research, IEEE Transactions on Biomedical Engineering, Nanotechnology, and Biomed Microdevices. James also holds several patents.

=== New Mexico legislature ===
In 2010 James ran unopposed to represent district 24 in the New Mexico House of Representatives. In the legislature he served on the appropriations committee and elections committee and received a "Spirit of Bipartisanship Award" from New Mexico First, a civic group founded by Jeff Bingaman and Pete Domenici. In 2012, along with state senator Nancy Rodriguez, James received a "Soaring Eagle Award" from the New Mexico Association of Counties for "leadership in securing legislation vital to protecting and advancing county interests."

He was defeated by Democratic Party challenger Elizabeth Thomson in 2012, losing by less than 300 votes. James in turn defeated Thompson by about 400 votes in 2014. In November 2015, James announced he would not seek reelection. James endorsed Christina Hall, an Albuquerque chiropractor and former Miss New Mexico, to succeed him.

=== University of New Mexico board of regents ===
In 2013 James was appointed to a five-year term on the board of regents of the University of New Mexico. Following his appointment, James said his priorities as a regent would include "evaluating the entrance and outcomes of underrepresented minorities at the university, and whether STEM graduates are going on to graduate schools and/or workforce" as well as developing partnerships with private and public sector groups to enhance the university's science and technology programs.

Within the board of regents, Conrad is vice-chair of the finance and facilities committee, and also serves on the board of directors of the University of New Mexico Health Sciences Center, which oversees the University of New Mexico School of Medicine, as well as the university's physical therapy and medical technology programs.

== Political views ==
=== Crime ===
While in the legislature, James introduced a bill that would strip the paternity rights of men convicted of rape that resulted in pregnancy. Under New Mexico law at the time, men convicted of rape could apply for custody of the children of the women they'd raped.

=== Education ===
James has said he supports charter schools and believes educational curriculum should focus on traditional academic and vocational subjects (the three Rs).

=== Public employees ===
James has said he wants cost of living adjustments for government employees to be tied to inflation and would vote to support increasing the retirement age for future public sector workers to "be in line with other states." He has also said he opposes increases in pension benefits for government employees. In the legislature, James voted for legislation that would prohibit government employees convicted of felonies from working as lobbyists and would authorize the forfeiture of pension of government employees convicted of public corruption. The measure also increased the prison term for bribery.

=== Tax policy ===
James has said he believes taxes should be kept "low, simple, broad, and predictable" and that increases in government spending should be matched to inflation and population growth. While in the legislature he co-sponsored House Bill 200, a bill that would have lowered corporate tax rates (the measure was ultimately defeated). James has said he opposes increases in the personal income tax rate as well.

== Personal life ==
James is married with one son and two daughters.
