= Patricia Lundstrom =

American politician (born 1959)

Patty Lundstrom

Member of the New Mexico House of Representatives from the 9th district
- Incumbent
- Assumed office January 2003
- Preceded by: Leo Watchman

Member of the New Mexico House of Representatives from the 5th district
- In office January 2001 – January 2003
- Preceded by: R. David Peterson
- Succeeded by: Irvin Harrison

Personal details
- Born: February 6, 1959 (age 67)
- Party: Democratic

Patricia "Patty" A. Lundstrom (born February 6, 1959) is an American politician and a Democratic member of the New Mexico House of Representatives representing District 9 since January 2003. Lundstrom served consecutively from January 2001 until January 2003 in the District 5 seat.

== Elections ==
- 2000 When District 5 incumbent Democratic Representative R. David Peterson ran for New Mexico Senate and left the seat open, Lundstrom ran in the 2000 Democratic Primary, winning with 1,583 votes (56%) and won the November 7, 2000 General election with 4,087 votes (67.4%) against Republican nominee Daniel Kruis.
- 2002 Redistricted to District 9, Lundstrom faced fellow Democratic Representative Leo Watchman in the 2002 Democratic Primary; she won with 1,445 votes (70.3%) and was unopposed for the November 5, 2002 General election, winning with 3,330 votes.
- 2004 Lundstrom was unopposed for the June 1, 2004 Democratic Primary, winning with 1,625 votes and won the November 2, 2004 General election with 5,304 votes (67.5%) against Republican nominee Michael Pyles.
- 2006 Lundstrom was unopposed for both the June 6, 2006 Democratic Primary, winning with 1,755 votes and the November 7, 2006 General election, winning with 5,007 votes.
- 2008 Lundstrom was challenged in the June 8, 2008 Democratic Primary, winning with 1,861 votes and was unopposed for the November 4, 2008 General election, winning with 6,511 votes.
- 2010 Lundstrom was challenged for the June 1, 2010 Democratic Primary, winning with 1,559 votes (67.4%) and was unopposed for the November 2, 2010 General election, winning with 4,340 votes.
- 2012 Lundstrom was unopposed for both the June 5, 2012 Democratic Primary, winning with 2,069 votes and the November 6, 2012 General election, winning with 6,246 votes.
