= James G. Townsend =

American politician

Jim Townsend

Minority Leader of the New Mexico House of Representatives
- In office March 14, 2024 – April 5, 2024; Acting
- Preceded by: T. Ryan Lane
- Succeeded by: Rod Montoya
- In office January 15, 2019 – January 17, 2023
- Preceded by: Nate Gentry
- Succeeded by: T. Ryan Lane

Member of the New Mexico House of Representatives from the 54th district
- In office January 1, 2015 – December 31, 2024
- Preceded by: William Gray
- Succeeded by: Jonathan Henry

Member of the New Mexico Senate from the 34th district
- Incumbent
- Assumed office January 1, 2025
- Preceded by: Ron Griggs

Personal details
- Born: 1954 or 1955 (age 70–71) Carlsbad, New Mexico, U.S.
- Party: Republican
- Spouse: Paula
- Children: 2

James G. Townsend (born 1954/1955) is an American politician who has served as a member of the New Mexico Legislature since 2015. He served as a member New Mexico House of Representatives, where he represented the 54th district from 2015 to 2024, and as a member of the New Mexico Senate, where he has represented the 34th district since 2025.

== Early life and education ==
Townsend was born and raised in Carlsbad, New Mexico.

== Career ==
Townsend worked several jobs in the energy sector, including as director of Holly Energy Partners, a subsidiary of HollyFrontier, from 2012 to 2017. Townsend was elected to the New Mexico House of Representatives in 2016 and became Minority Leader at the start of the 2019 legislative session. An opponent of abortion, Townsend voted against House Bill 51, which attempted to repeal an old New Mexico law that made it a crime to perform an abortion.

In 2022, Townsend obstructed the New Mexico legislature from passing voting reform legislation. The legislation would have allowed people to sign up once to receive absentee ballots in future elections; restored the voting rights of felons; and required every county to provide a minimum of two ballot drop boxes.

Townsend served as the House minority leader from 2019 to 2023. Following the resignation of his successor T. Ryan Lane in March 2024 Townsend assumed the position of acting minority leader.

New Mexico House of Representatives
Preceded by Nate Gentry	Minority Leader of the New Mexico House of Representatives; 2019–2023	Succeeded by T. Ryan Lane
Preceded by T. Ryan Lane	Minority Leader of the New Mexico House of Representatives; Acting; 2024	Succeeded by Rod Montoya
