= Alonzo Baldonado =

American politician (born 1974)

Member of the New Mexico House of Representatives from the 8th district
- In office 2011–2021
- Preceded by: Elias Barela
- Succeeded by: Brian Baca

Personal details
- Born: January 29, 1974 (age 52) Albuquerque, New Mexico, U.S.
- Party: Republican
- Spouse: Rebecca Baldonado
- Education: University of New Mexico (BBA)

Alonzo Baldonado (born January 29, 1974) is an American politician and real estate broker who served as a member of the New Mexico House of Representatives for the 8th district from 2011 to 2021. A native of Albuquerque, New Mexico, Baldonado earned a Bachelor of Business Administration degree from the University of New Mexico.

Baldonado resigned from the House in December 2021 and was succeeded by Brian Baca.
