= Zachary Cook =

Republican member of the New Mexico House of Representatives

Member of the New Mexico House of Representatives from the 56th district
- In office January 16, 2009 – December 31, 2022
- Preceded by: W. C. Williams
- Succeeded by: Harlan Vincent

Personal details
- Party: Republican
- Education: University of New Mexico School of Law
- Profession: Attorney

Zachary J. Cook is an American politician and a former Republican member of the New Mexico House of Representatives representing District 56 from his January 16, 2009 appointment by Governor of New Mexico Bill Richardson to fill the vacancy caused by the resignation of W. C. Williams until 2022.

== Education ==
Cook graduated from University of New Mexico School of Law.

== Elections ==
- 2012 Cook was unopposed for both the June 5, 2012 Republican Primary, winning with 1,882 votes and the November 6, 2012 General election, winning with 7,721 votes.
- 2010 Cook was unopposed for both the June 1, 2010 Republican Primary, winning with 2,007 votes and the November 2, 2010 General election, winning with 5,620 votes.

== Notable legislation ==
In 2015, Cook introduced H.B 560, a bill to end civil asset forfeiture, replacing it with criminal asset forfeiture. The bill was signed into law on April 10, 2015.
