= John J. Mershon =

American politician

- Mershon in 1976

Member of the New Mexico House of Representatives
- In office 1958–1982

Personal details
- Born: September 16, 1908 Siloam Springs, Arkansas, U.S.
- Died: July 6, 2004 (aged 95) Alamogordo, New Mexico, U.S.
- Party: Democratic
- Education: Oklahoma Baptist University; George Washington University

John J. Mershon (September 16, 1908 – July 6, 2004) was an American politician. He served as a Democratic member of the New Mexico House of Representatives.

== Life and career ==
Mershon was born in Siloam Springs, Arkansas. He attended Oklahoma Baptist University and George Washington University.

In 1958, Mershon was elected to the New Mexico House of Representatives, serving until 1982.

Mershon died on July 6, 2004 in Alamogordo, New Mexico, at the age of 95.
