= Christine Trujillo =

American politician

Member of the New Mexico House of Representatives from the 25th district
- In office January 15, 2013 – July 1, 2023
- Preceded by: Danice Picraux
- Succeeded by: Cristina Parajón

Personal details
- Party: Democratic
- Education: New Mexico Highlands University; University of New Mexico

Christine Trujillo is an American politician and a former Democratic member of the New Mexico House of Representatives representing District 25, in office from January 15, 2013 until July 1, 2023.

== Education ==
Trujillo earned her BA in Education from New Mexico Highlands University and her MA in education from the University of New Mexico.

== Elections ==
- 2012 When District 25 incumbent Democratic Representative Danice Picraux retired and left the seat open, Trujillo ran in the three-way June 5, 2012 Democratic Primary and won with 1,652 votes (62.2%) and won the November 6, 2012 General election with 8,383 votes (63.1%) against Republican nominee Elisabeth Keen.
- 2002 Trujillo was unopposed for the District 3 New Mexico Board of Education Democratic Primary and won a four-year term in the November 5, 2002 General election against Republican nominee Mary Gilbert.
