= Deborah A. Armstrong =

American politician

Debbie Armstrong

Member of the New Mexico House of Representatives from the 17th district
- In office January 20, 2015 – July 15, 2022
- Preceded by: Edward Sandoval
- Succeeded by: Linda Garcia Benavides

Director of the New Mexico Department of Aging and Long-Term Services
- In office 2004–2007
- Governor: Bill Richardson

Personal details
- Party: Democratic
- Education: University of Michigan (BS); University of New Mexico (JD)

Deborah A. "Debbie" Armstrong is an American health consultant, businesswoman, and politician who served as a member of the New Mexico House of Representatives for the 17th district from January 2015 to July 2022.

== Education ==
Armstrong earned a Bachelor of Science degree in physical therapy from the University of Michigan and a Juris Doctor in health law from the University of New Mexico School of Law.

== Career ==
For 25 years, Armstrong worked as a licensed physical therapist. Armstrong was executive director of the New Mexico Medical Insurance Pool. From 2004 to 2007, she was Director of the New Mexico Aging and Long Term Services Department under Governor Bill Richardson. She was also the president of Delta Consulting Group, a business management consulting firm based in Albuquerque, New Mexico. From January 2013 to January 2014, she served as deputy chief of staff and district director for then-Congresswoman Michelle Lujan Grisham. Armstrong was elected to the New Mexico House of Representatives in 2014 and assumed office on January 20, 2015. During her tenure, Armstrong served as chair of the House Health and Human Services Committee and vice chair of the Rules and Order of Business Committee.

In July 2022, Armstrong announced that she would resign from the House.
