= G. Andrés Romero =

American politician

Member of the New Mexico House of Representatives from the 10th district
- Incumbent
- Assumed office January 20, 2015
- Preceded by: Henry Saavedra

Personal details
- Born: Gregorio Andrés Romero Albuquerque, New Mexico, U.S
- Party: Democratic
- Spouse: Athena
- Children: 2
- Education: University of New Mexico (BA, MA)

Gregorio Andrés Romero is an American politician and educator serving as a member of the New Mexico House of Representatives from the 10th district.

== Early life and education ==
Romero was born and raised in Albuquerque, New Mexico. He earned a Bachelor of Arts degree in philosophy in 2010 and a Master of Arts in history from the University of New Mexico in 2015.

== Career ==
Romero is a social studies teacher at Atrisco Heritage Academy High School.

In 2014, Romero ran for election to represent the 10th district in the New Mexico House of Representatives, replacing Henry Saavedra, who had decided not to run for re-election. He won a three-way Democratic primary, and went on to win the general election with 58.1% of the vote. Since then, he has been re-elected twice, and is seeking election to a fourth term in 2020.

Romero sits on the following standing House committees:

- Education (chair)
- Transportation, Public Works & Capital Improvements
- Rules & Order of Business

== Personal life ==
He and his wife, Athena, have two children.

== Electoral record ==
=== 2014 ===
2014 Democratic primary election: New Mexico House of Representatives, District 10
Party	Candidate	Votes	%
Democratic	G. Andrés Romero	619	51.03%
Democratic	Randy L. Saavedra	324	26.71%
Democratic	Sisto A. Abeyta	270	22.26%

2014 general election: New Mexico House of Representatives, District 10
Party	Candidate	Votes	%
Democratic	G. Andrés Romero	2,463	58.06%
Independent	Robert A. Schiller	1,779	41.94%

=== 2016 ===
In 2016, Romero was unopposed in the Democratic primary.

2016 general election: New Mexico House of Representatives, District 10
Party	Candidate	Votes	%
Democratic	G. Andrés Romero	4,821	67.35%
Independent	Robert Schiller	2,337	32.65%

=== 2018 ===
In 2018, Romero was unopposed in both the Democratic primary and the general election.
