= Derrick Lente =

American politician

Member of the New Mexico House of Representatives from the 65th district
- Incumbent
- Assumed office January 2017
- Preceded by: James Madalena

Personal details
- Born: Sandia Pueblo, New Mexico, U.S.
- Party: Democratic
- Education: University of New Mexico (BA, JD)

Derrick J. Lente is an American politician and businessman serving as a member of the New Mexico House of Representatives. Elected in 2017, Lente represents the 65th district.

== Early life and education ==
Born and raised on the Sandia Pueblo reservation, Lente attended public schools in Bernalillo County. After taking courses at Central New Mexico Community College, Lente earned a Bachelor of Arts degree in intercultural communications and English from the University of New Mexico. He then earned a Juris Doctor from the University of New Mexico School of Law.

== Career ==
After graduating from law school, Lente purchased an employment agency with offices in New Mexico and California. The business grew to become one of the largest solely-owned Native American corporations in the United States. Lente sold the business in 2013.

Lente defeated 30-year-incumbent James Madalena in the 2016 Democratic primary, and took office in January 2017. Lente appeared at the 2020 Democratic National Convention to announce the votes of New Mexico's delegates.
