= John Heaton (New Mexico politician) =

American politician

John A. Heaton is an American retired pharmacist and former member of the New Mexico House of Representatives who lives in Carlsbad, New Mexico. He served in the legislature from 1997 to 2010, representing district 55, Eddy County.

A building at the National Cave and Karst Research Institute in Carlsbad was named after him in 2016.
