= Miguel Garcia (politician) =

Member of the New Mexico House of Representatives

Member of the New Mexico House of Representatives from the 14th district
- Incumbent
- Assumed office January 1997
- Preceded by: Ray Sanchez

Personal details
- Born: January 19, 1951 (age 75) New Mexico, U.S.
- Party: Democratic
- Education: Eastern New Mexico University; University of New Mexico

Miguel P. Garcia (born January 19, 1951) is an American politician and a Democratic member of the New Mexico House of Representatives representing District 14 since January 1997.

== Education ==
Garcia earned his BA from Eastern New Mexico University and his MA from the University of New Mexico.

== Elections ==
- 1996 Garcia challenged District 14 incumbent Democratic Representative Ray Sanchez in the four-way June 4, 1996, Democratic Primary, winning with 940 votes (44.8%) and was unopposed for the November 5, 1996, General election.
- 1998 Garcia was challenged in the June 2, 1998, Democratic Primary but won, and was unopposed for the November 3, 1998, General election, winning with 3,802 votes.
- 2000 Garcia was unopposed for the 2000 Democratic Primary, winning with 1,712 votes and won the November 7, 2000, General election with 4,491 votes (78.2%) against Republican nominee Gwen Poe.
- 2002 Garcia was challenged in the three-way 2002 Democratic Primary, winning with 1,389 votes (61.3%) and won the November 5, 2002, General election with 3,819 votes (75.5%) against Republican nominee Jerry Sanchez.
- 2004 Garcia was unopposed for the June 1, 2004, Democratic Primary, winning with 1,912 votes and won the November 2, 2004, General election with 5,357 votes (72.6%) against Republican nominee Clara Pena, who had lost the Republican Primary in 2002.
- 2006 Garcia and returning 2004 Republican challenger Pena were both unopposed for their June 6, 2006, primaries, setting up a rematch; Garica won the November 7, 2006, General election with 4,631 votes (77.1%) against Pena.
- 2008 Garcia was challenged in the June 8, 2008, Democratic Primary, winning with 1,943 votes (75.4%); Pena was unopposed for hers, setting up their third contest; Garcia won the November 4, 2008, General election with 6,713 votes (77.6%) against Pena.
- 2010 Garcia was challenged in the June 1, 2010, Democratic Primary, winning with 1,201 votes (69.4%); Pena was unopposed for hers, setting up their fourth contest; Garcia won the November 2, 2010, General election with 4,187 votes (70.6%) against Pena.
- 2012 Garcia and his perennial Republican challenger Clara Pena were both unopposed for their June 5, 2012, primaries, setting up their fifth direct contest; Garcia won the November 6, 2012, General election with 5,743 votes (73.2%) against Pena.
- 2022 Republican candidate Solomon Peña challenged Garcia and lost 2,033 (26%) to 5,679 (74%) votes.
