= Matthew McQueen (politician) =

American politician and attorney (born 1967)

Member of the New Mexico House of Representatives from the 50th district
- Incumbent
- Assumed office January 20, 2015
- Preceded by: Vicky Perea
- Succeeded by: Sarah Boses (elect)

Personal details
- Born: 1967 (age 58–59) Pasadena, California, U.S.
- Party: Democratic
- Education: Williams College (BA); University of Michigan (JD, MS); University of New Mexico (MBA)

Matthew McQueen (born 1967) is an American politician and attorney, currently serving as a member of the New Mexico House of Representatives from the 50th district, which covers portions of Santa Fe County and Sandoval County.

== Early life and education ==
McQueen was born in 1967 in Pasadena, California. He earned a Bachelor of Arts from Williams College, a Juris Doctor from the University of Michigan Law School, an MBA from the University of New Mexico, and a Master of Science from the University of Michigan School for Environment and Sustainability.

== Career ==
After law school, McQueen worked as a law clerk on the New Mexico Court of Appeals. Prior to entering politics, McQueen worked as an attorney in the New Mexico Office of the State Engineer. McQueen also operates his own law firm, Matthew McQueen PC, in Santa Fe, New Mexico. McQueen assumed office on January 20, 2015 after defeating incumbent Republican Vicky Perea.

In January 2020, McQueen submitted a bill that would require sex offenders registered in another state to be automatically registered as sex offenders in New Mexico within 20 days of their arrival in the state.

In the 57th New Mexico State Legislature, McQueen served as Chair of the House Energy, Environment & Natural Resources committee, and as a member of the House Judiciary Committee.

On June 30, 2025, McQueen announced that he would run for New Mexico Commissioner of Public Lands in 2026.
