= Javier Martínez (politician) =

American attorney, activist and politician

- Martínez in 2016

31st Speaker of the New Mexico House of Representatives
- Incumbent
- Assumed office January 17, 2023
- Preceded by: Brian Egolf

Majority Leader of the New Mexico House of Representatives
- In office August 10, 2021 – January 17, 2023
- Preceded by: Doreen Gallegos (acting)
- Succeeded by: Gail Chasey

Member of the New Mexico House of Representatives from the 11th district
- Incumbent
- Assumed office January 20, 2015
- Preceded by: Rick Miera

Personal details
- Party: Democratic
- Education: University of New Mexico (BA, JD)

Javier Martínez is an American attorney, activist, and politician who is the current Speaker of the New Mexico House of Representatives since 2023. A Democrat, he represents the 11th district, which includes Bernalillo County, New Mexico and the city of Albuquerque

== Early life and education ==
Martínez was raised in Albuquerque, New Mexico. The son of Mexican immigrants, Martínez became the first in his family to attend college. He earned a bachelor's degree and Juris Doctor in international and comparative law from the University of New Mexico.

== Career ==
After graduating from law school, Martínez worked as a community organizer in Albuquerque, New Mexico. Martínez works as a policy director and general counsel at the Partnership for Community Action in South Valley, New Mexico, and previously worked as a public health advocate at the University of Michigan. Martínez was elected to the New Mexico House of Representatives in 2014 and took office on January 20, 2015, succeeding Democratic incumbent Rick Miera.

On August 10, 2021, Martínez was selected to succeed Sheryl Williams Stapleton as majority leader of the House.

In December 2022, a suspect shot at Martínez's home. No injuries were reported. Solomon Peña, an unsuccessful Republican candidate for state representative, was later arrested in connection with the shooting, along with several other shootings that targeted Democratic politicians in Albuquerque.

New Mexico House of Representatives
Preceded by Doreen Gallegos; Acting	Majority Leader of the New Mexico House of Representatives; 2021–2023	Succeeded by Gail Chasey
Political offices
Preceded by Brian Egolf	Speaker of the New Mexico House of Representatives; 2023–present	Incumbent
