= Monica Youngblood =

American politician

Member of the New Mexico House of Representatives from the 68th district
- In office January 15, 2013 – January 15, 2019
- Preceded by: Thomas Garcia
- Succeeded by: Karen C. Bash

Personal details
- Party: Republican
- Website: mynmstaterep.com

Monica Christina Youngblood is an American politician and a former member of the New Mexico House of Representatives. She represented District 68 (northwest Albuquerque) from January 15, 2013, to January 15, 2019.

During her three terms in the state legislature, she was known for being tough on crime, sponsoring legislation to bring back the death penalty and supporting tougher penalties for people suspected of driving under the influence.

== Elections ==
- 2012 Youngblood ran for the New Mexico House of Representatives: District 68. A seat that incumbent Democratic State Representative Thomas Garcia left open to run for the New Mexico Senate. Youngblood ran in the four-way June 5, 2012 Republican primary and won with 763 votes, (44.7%). Then won the November 6, 2012 general election with 6,908 votes (55%) against Democratic nominee Eloise Gift.
- On November 6, 2018, Youngblood lost re-election to Democratic challenger Karen Bash.

Monica Youngblood was arrested on May 20, 2018, at a sobriety checkpoint under suspicion of driving under the influence. According to police, Youngblood smelled of alcohol and her speech was slurred. She was placed under arrest after performing poorly on field sobriety tests and refusing to take a breathalyzer test.

As a legislator, she had been a vocal supporter of harsher DUI penalties. She also introduced legislation to bring Lyft and Uber to New Mexico, due to the drunk driving problem in the state.

Youngblood maintained her innocence and requested a jury trial, which was denied by the judge. After a bench trial which lasted nearly four hours, she was found guilty of aggravated drunken driving. She was represented in court by Paul Kennedy, a former justice of the New Mexico Supreme Court. She was sentenced to the mandatory minimum of 48 hours in jail (with credit for one day served), in addition to one year of probation, mandatory use of an ignition interlock for one year, attendance at DUI school, completion of 24 hours of community service and payment of court costs and fees.
