= Doreen Wonda Johnson =

American politician

Member of the New Mexico House of Representatives from the 5th district
- Incumbent
- Assumed office January 2015
- Preceded by: Sandra Jeff

Personal details
- Born: June 12, 1965 (age 61) Crownpoint, New Mexico, U.S.
- Party: Democratic
- Education: Marymount University (BA)

Doreen Wonda Johnson is an American politician serving as a member of the New Mexico House of Representatives from the 5th district. Elected in 2014, she assumed office in 2015. Johnson is a member of the Navajo Nation.

== Early life and education ==
Johnson was born in Crownpoint, New Mexico. She earned a Bachelor of Arts degree in education from Marymount University in Arlington County, Virginia.

== Career ==
In the 2014 general election, Johnson defeated Democratic incumbent Sandra Jeff who ran as a write-in candidate after she failed to obtain sufficient signatures to qualify for the primary.

In the 2016 legislative session, Johnson served on the Committee on Compacts, the Education Committee, and the Regulatory and Public Affairs Committee.

In the 2016 primary election, Johnson was challenged by Kevin M. Mitchell, a council member of Gallup-McKinley County Schools.

== See also ==
- List of Native American politicians
- Native American women in politics
