= Paul Bandy =

American politician (born 1944)

Member of the New Mexico House of Representatives from the 3rd district
- In office January 2007 – January 19, 2021
- Preceded by: Sandra Townsend
- Succeeded by: T. Ryan Lane

Personal details
- Born: 1944 (age 81–82)
- Party: Republican
- Education: University of Houston; University of Texas at Austin
- Website: paulbandy.org

Paul C. Bandy (born 1944) is an American politician who served as a member of the New Mexico House of Representatives from January 2007 to January 2021.

== Education ==
Bandy attended the University of Houston and University of Texas at Austin.

== Elections ==
- 2012: Bandy was unopposed for both the June 5, 2012 Republican Primary, winning with 1,706 votes and the November 6, 2012 General election, winning with 7,775 votes.
- 2006: When District 3 Republican Representative Sandra Townsend retired and left the seat open, Bandy was unopposed for both the June 6, 2006 Republican Primary, winning with 1,257 votes and the November 7, 2006 General election, winning with 5,591 votes.
- 2008: Bandy was unopposed for both the June 8, 2008 Republican Primary, winning with 1,712 votes and the November 4, 2008 General election, winning with 8,335 votes.
- 2010: Bandy was unopposed for both the June 1, 2010 Republican Primary, winning with 2,247 votes and the November 2, 2010 General election, winning with 6,997 votes.
