= Elizabeth Thomson (politician) =

American politician

Member of the New Mexico House of Representatives from the 24th district
- Incumbent
- Assumed office January 15, 2017
- Preceded by: Conrad James
- In office January 15, 2013 – January 15, 2015
- Preceded by: Conrad James
- Succeeded by: Conrad James

Personal details
- Born: 1960 or 1961 (age 65–66)
- Party: Democratic
- Education: University of New Mexico
- Profession: Physical therapist

Elizabeth 'Liz' L. Thomson (born 1960 or 1961) is an American politician and a Democratic member of the New Mexico House of Representatives representing District 24 since January 15, 2017 and previously from January 15, 2013 to January 15, 2015.

== Early life and education ==
Thomson graduated from the University of New Mexico with a B.S. degree in physical therapy.

== Career ==
=== Physical therapy ===
Thomson's career has been spent as a pediatric physical therapist. In addition to her clinical work, she has served on the board of directors of the New Mexico chapter of the American Physical Therapy Association.

=== New Mexico Legislature ===
In 2012 Thomson ran for the New Mexico House of Representatives district 24 seat held by Republican representative Conrad James, beating the incumbent by less than 300 votes. She has announced her intention to seek reelection in 2014, in what will likely be a replay of the 2012 race against James.

== Political views ==
=== Public health ===
Thomson introduced legislation to establish the New Mexico Fall Prevention Task Force. The goal of the task force is to prevent older adult falls. (In New Mexico, falls are the leading cause of injury-related deaths, hospitalizations, and emergency department visits among older adults.) The program includes an awareness campaign about modifiable fall risk factors as well as an increase in availability of fall prevention classes around the state. It was enacted by the legislature and signed into law in 2014.

=== Animal Welfare ===
Thomson has been a strong opponent of horse slaughter. In the legislature, Thomson sponsored House Bill 121 which would have banned the use of horses as a foodsource, and House Bill 120 which would have required horses be husbanded according to state regulations for livestock. Neither measure passed out of committee. Thomson also voted for a bill that would prohibit the use of performance-enhancing drugs by racehorses.

== Personal life ==
Thomson is married and has two children.
