= W. Ken Martinez =

American politician

22nd Speaker of the New Mexico House of Representatives
- In office 2012–2015
- Preceded by: Ben Luján
- Succeeded by: Don Tripp

Member of the New Mexico House of Representatives from the 69th district
- In office 1998 – September 9, 2016
- Succeeded by: Harry Garcia

Personal details
- Born: Walter Kenneth Martinez, Jr. February 12, 1959 (age 67) Albuquerque, New Mexico, U.S.
- Party: Democratic
- Relations: Walter K. Martinez (father)
- Education: University of New Mexico (BA); University of Notre Dame (JD)

Walter Kenneth Martinez Jr. (born February 12, 1959) is an American attorney and politician who served as a member of the New Mexico House of Representatives from 1998 to 2016. He served as House Majority Leader from 2005 to 2013. That year, he was elected as Speaker of the House, and served until 2015.

== Early life and education ==
Martinez was born in Albuquerque, New Mexico, on February 12, 1959, into a political family. His parents were Walter K. Martinez and Dolores Martinez. He is Roman Catholic. His father was a member of a group of Hispanic and liberal Anglo legislators called the Mama Lucy Gang, who controlled the New Mexico House of Representatives in the early-1970s. He served as House Speaker from 1971 to 1978.

Martinez earned a bachelor's degree from the University of New Mexico in 1981 and a Juris Doctor from the Notre Dame Law School in 1984. His siblings also went into law. His older sister, Camille Olguin, became a state district judge, and his younger brother, Kevin Martinez, became a lawyer.

== Career ==
Martinez was elected to the New Mexico House of Representatives in 1998, taking office in 1999 and serving to September 2016.

In the June 1, 2010, Democratic primary Martinez was elected by 2,130 votes. He was unopposed in the November 2, 2010, general election for the 69th District, winning with 5,379 votes.

Martinez served as House majority leader for eight years up to 2013. Martinez was elected as Speaker of the House in 2012, sworn in by Governor Susana Martínez on 15 January 2013. He served until 2015, when he was In 2014 he was still speaker of the house. Martinez resigned from office in 2016 and was succeeded by Harry Garcia.

He was co-chair of the legislative council, capitol buildings planning commission and jobs council. He was a member of legislative committees on Labor and Human Resources, Rules and Order of Business, and Voters and Elections.

== Personal life ==
As of 2016, Martinez was married and resident in Albuquerque, New Mexico. Martinez is the Bernalillo county attorney.

== Sources ==
- Boyd, Dan (January 15, 2013). "Breaking: Rep. Ken Martinez Elected House Speaker". Albuquerque Journal.
- "Ken Martinez's Biography". Vote Smart.
- Lenderman, Andy (January 28, 2005). "Rising Star: Father's Example Looms Large for House Majority Leader". Albuquerque Journal.
- "New Mexico House of Representatives elections, 2010". Ballotpedia.
- Reichbach, Matthew (February 12, 2014). "Speaker on budget: Not quite there yet, not on floor tomorrow". New Mexico Telegram. Archived from the original on March 5, 2014.
- "Rep. W. Ken Martinez (D-NM 69th District)". AVMA.
- "Representative W. Ken Martinez - (D)". New Mexico Legislature.
- "Speaker Ken W. Martinez Leadership Fund". Democracy.com.
- Unterburger, Amy L; Delgado, Jane L (1994). Who's who Among Hispanic Americans. Gale Research. ISBN 978-0-8103-8550-4.
