= Murray Ryan (American politician) =

American politician (1922–2017)

Member of the New Mexico House of Representatives for the 38th district
- In office 1969–1999

Personal details
- Born: July 22, 1922 Santa Clara, New Mexico, U.S.
- Died: January 7, 2017 (aged 94) Silver City, New Mexico, U.S.
- Party: Republican
- Spouse: Marian (died 2001)
- Education: United States Military Academy at West Point, graduated 1945

William "Murray" Ryan (July 22, 1922 – January 7, 2017) was an American politician who was a Republican member of the New Mexico House of Representatives from 1969 to 1999.

== Early life and education ==
He attended Western High School. He attended New Mexico State Teachers College and then graduated from the United States Military Academy in 1945. Ryan then served in the United States Army where he was stationed in German until 1948 and Fort Lewis, Washington until 1949.

== Career ==
He was a businessman and worked in his family's liquor. Ryan also served on the local school board.

== Later life ==
Ryan is buried at Memory Lane Cemetery, Silver City, New Mexico next to his wife Marian.
