= Patricio Ruiloba =

American politician

Member of the New Mexico House of Representatives from the 12th district
- In office January 1, 2015 – September 9, 2020
- Preceded by: Ernest Chavez
- Succeeded by: Art De La Cruz

Personal details
- Born: March 28, 1967 (age 59) Albuquerque, New Mexico
- Party: Democratic

Patricio Ruiloba (born March 28, 1967) is an American politician who has served in the New Mexico House of Representatives for 12th district from 2015 to 2020. He resigned from the House in 2020 to run for sheriff of Bernalillo County, New Mexico. Art De La Cruz was then appointed to serve for the remainder of his term.
