= Raymond G. Sanchez =

American politician

Member of the New Mexico House of Representatives from the 15th district
- In office 1972–2000
- Succeeded by: John Sanchez

Personal details
- Born: September 22, 1941 (age 85) Albuquerque, New Mexico, U.S.
- Relations: Michael S. Sanchez (brother)
- Education: University of New Mexico (BA, JD)
- Occupation: Lawyer, politician

Raymond G. Sanchez (born September 22, 1941) is an American attorney, lobbyist, and former politician who served as a member of the New Mexico House of Representatives.

== Early life and education ==
Raymond G. Sanchez was born in Albuquerque, New Mexico, on September 22, 1941. He attended the University of New Mexico, where he earned a Bachelor of Arts in Government in 1964 and Juris Doctor from the University of New Mexico School of Law in 1967. His younger brother is Michael S. Sanchez, an attorney who served in the New Mexico Senate.

== Career ==
Sanchez was elected to the New Mexico House of Representatives for district 15 in 1971. He held office until 2000. Sanchez and Walter K. Martinez were leaders of the liberal "Mama Lucy Gang". (Note: The Mama Lucies were named after Mama Lucy, a lady who ran a coffee shop and helped out poor students at New Mexico Highlands University in Las Vegas, Nevada. A group of future state legislators were at the university at the time, and learned from Mama Lucy's compassionate example.) This group controlled the house and prevented conservative "Cowboy Democrats" from the ranching areas in the south of the state from controlling the main committees. In the 1982 election, the liberal Democrats formed a solid majority of the forty seven Democratic members, and Sanchez was elected speaker without opposition from the Cowboys. Sanchez was speaker of the house for sixteen years. In 2000, Raymond Sanchez failed to be reelected to the house, losing to newcomer John Sanchez, a Republican.

After leaving office, Sanchez returned to practicing the law, mainly working on government relations and personal injury. Sanchez became a president of the regents of the University of New Mexico.

In the 2010s, Sanchez was working as a lobbyist at the New Mexico legislature for clients such as Virgin Galactic. Sanchez also worked as a lobbyist for Albuquerque cab companies.
