= Don Tripp =

American politician (born 1946)

23rd Speaker of the New Mexico House of Representatives
- In office January 20, 2015 – January 20, 2017
- Preceded by: Ken Martinez
- Succeeded by: Brian Egolf

Member of the New Mexico House of Representatives from the 49th district
- In office January 1999 – 2017
- Preceded by: Michael Olguin
- Succeeded by: Gail Armstrong

Personal details
- Born: February 23, 1946 (age 80) Pasadena, California, U.S.
- Party: Republican
- Education: New Mexico Institute of Mining and Technology (BA)
- Website: Official website

Don L. Tripp (born February 23, 1946) is an American politician who served as a Republican member of the New Mexico House of Representatives for District 49 from January 1999 to 2017.

== Education ==
Tripp earned his BA from New Mexico Institute of Mining and Technology.

== Elections ==
- 2012 Tripp was unopposed for the June 5, 2012, Republican Primary, winning with 1,661 votes and won the November 6, 2012, General election with 9,213 votes (98%) against Democratic write-in candidate Dell Washington.
- 1998 To challenge District 49 incumbent Democratic Representative Michael Olguin, Tripp won the June 2, 1998, Republican Primary with 1,760 votes (77.1%) and won the November 3, 1998, General election with 3,425 votes (52.8%) against Representative Olguin (the results are reversed).
- 2000 Tripp was unopposed for the 2000 Republican Primary, winning with 1,281 votes; former Representative Olguin won against a challenger, setting up a rematch. Tripp won the November 7, 2000, General election with 4,000 votes (58.9%) against former Representative Olguin.
- 2002 Tripp was unopposed for the 2002 Republican Primary, winning with 1,432 votes and won the November 5, 2002, General election, winning with 3,900 votes (66.4%) against Democratic nominee Salomon Mantano.
- 2004 Tripp was unopposed for the June 1, 2004, Republican Primary, winning with 1,064 votes and won the November 2, 2004, General election with 7,376 votes (60.6%) against Democratic nominee Ravi Bhasker.
- 2006 Tripp was unopposed for both the June 6, 2006, Republican Primary, winning with 1,641 votes and the November 7, 2006, General election, winning with 7,651 votes.
- 2008 Tripp was unopposed for both the June 8, 2008, Republican Primary, winning with 2,061 votes and the November 4, 2008, General election, winning with 9,688 votes.
- 2010 Tripp was unopposed for both the June 1, 2010, Republican Primary, winning with 2,250 votes and the November 2, 2010, General election, winning with 8,089 votes.
