= Walter K. Martinez =

American politician (1930–1986)

Speaker of the New Mexico House of Representatives
- In office 1971–1979

Member of the New Mexico House of Representatives from the 69th district
- In office 1966–1984

Personal details
- Born: November 16, 1930 Tierra Amarilla, New Mexico, U.S.
- Died: May 11, 1986 (aged 55) Grants, New Mexico, U.S.
- Children: 3, including Walter Jr.
- Education: University of New Mexico (LLB)

Walter Kenneth Martinez, Sr. (November 16, 1930 – May 11, 1986) was an American attorney and politician who served as a member of the New Mexico House of Representatives. A liberal member of the Democratic Party, he served as speaker of the House for eight years. before being removed from the position in 1979, when conservative Democrats allied with Republicans to elect a conservative Democrat as speaker.

== Early life and education ==
Martinez was born in Tierra Amarilla, New Mexico, one of eleven children in poor but well-educated family. He studied law at the University of New Mexico and graduated in 1955. He became a general legal practitioner with the firm of Tibo Chavez and Boucher and established an office in Grants, New Mexico.

== Career ==
In 1966, Martinez was elected to the New Mexico House of Representatives as a Democrat representing Valencia County, New Mexico. He served in the House for eighteen years. Until 1971, the House had been dominated by conservative Democrats, mostly from the south and east of New Mexico. That had begun to change after the Supreme Court "one man, one vote" decision in Baker v. Carr (1962), which forced electoral districts to be more balanced in size and led to growing numbers of liberal Hispanic and urban intellectual representatives. In 1971, when Martinez was in his third term, the position of speaker came open. After a tie on the first vote, Martinez was elected speaker by a one-vote margin.

For eight years Martinez was one of the leaders of the liberal "Mama Lucy Gang", which controlled the house and prevented conservative "Cowboy Democrats" from the ranching areas in the south of the state from controlling the main committees. (Note: The Mama Lucies were named after Mama Lucy, a lady who ran a coffee shop and helped out poor students at New Mexico Highlands University in Las Vegas, Nevada. A group of future state legislators were at the university at the time, and learned from Mama Lucy's compassionate example.) Another leader was Raymond G. Sanchez. Martinez's achievements included equalizing school district funding across the state and developing New Mexico's severance tax permanent fund.

In 1977 Martinez was chosen as candidate for speaker of the Democratic caucus by 26–22, going on to reelection as speaker. The Cowboys did well in the 1978 election and demanded a strong presence in the committees. Martinez refused, which turned out to be a mistake. He was then chosen the Democratic caucus by 30 votes to 11 for Gene Samberson. During the opening session of the house on January 16, 1979, eleven Democrats allied with twenty six Republicans to elect the Cowboy Democrat Gene Samberson as speaker by thirty seven votes against the thirty Democrats and three rogue Republicans who voted for Martinez. The Mama Lucy Gang remained out of power for the next four years. (Note: Samberson appointed nine Democrats to committee positions. Martinez refused to chair the Votes and Elections Committee, effectively giving control of this committee to the Republicans. Five of the Democrats who had backed Martinez refused appointments as vice-chairs of committees.)

Martinez and Joseph Fidel worked together to obtain funding for many projects in the Grants area. In 1981 Martinez was the main force behind the legislation that split Cibola County, New Mexico, out of Valencia County. Grants was the seat of the new county. In the 1982 election, the liberal Democrats formed a solid majority of the forty seven Democratic members, and the Martinez-backed candidate Raymond G. Sanchez was elected speaker without opposition from the Cowboys.

== Personal life ==
Martinez was married to Dolores Nolasco. They had three children, a girl and two boys, all of whom became lawyers. His eldest son, W. Ken Martinez, served as a member of and Speaker of the House in the New Mexico House of Representatives from 1998 to 2016. His daughter became a district judge. His youngest son served on the Grants Board of Education.

Martinez was diagnosed with Amyotrophic lateral sclerosis (Lou Gehrig's disease) and left the House in 1984. He died in 1986 at the age of 55. An enclosed walkway linking the Capitol and the newly built Capitol Annex was dedicated to Martinez in 2001.The University of New Mexico School of Law posthumously awarded his the Distinguished Achievement award.

== Sources ==
- Boyd, Dan (January 15, 2013). "Breaking: Rep. Ken Martinez Elected House Speaker". Albuquerque Journal.
- Hain, Paul L.; Garcia, F. Chris; Clair, Gilbert K. St. (1994). New Mexico Government. UNM Press. ISBN 978-0-8263-1508-3.
- Jaramillo, Donald; Milan, Paul (October 28, 2013). Grants-Milan. Arcadia Publishing. ISBN 978-0-7385-9964-9.
- Kousser, Thad (2005). Term Limits and the Dismantling of State Legislative Professionalism. Cambridge University Press. ISBN 978-0-521-54873-1.
- Lenderman, Andy (January 28, 2005). "Rising Star: Father's Example Looms Large for House Majority Leader". Albuquerque Journal.
- Martinez, Ken (2009). "Common Geographies". Moving Beyond Borders: Julian Samora and the Establishment of Latino Studies. University of Illinois Press. ISBN 978-0-252-07656-5.
- Peña, Abe (June 25, 2009). "Walter Martinez - The Speaker of the House". Cibola Beacon.
- Sharp, Nancy Weatherly; Sharp, James Roger (January 1, 1997). American Legislative Leaders in the West, 1911-1994. Greenwood Publishing Group. ISBN 978-0-313-30212-1.
- "Walter Martinez (posthumously)". Distinguished Achievement Honorees. University of New Mexico School of Law.
