= Española, New Mexico =

City in the United States

Española Búuˀtsąąbiˀi / Búuˀtsʼąąbiˀiweh (Tewa)
- City
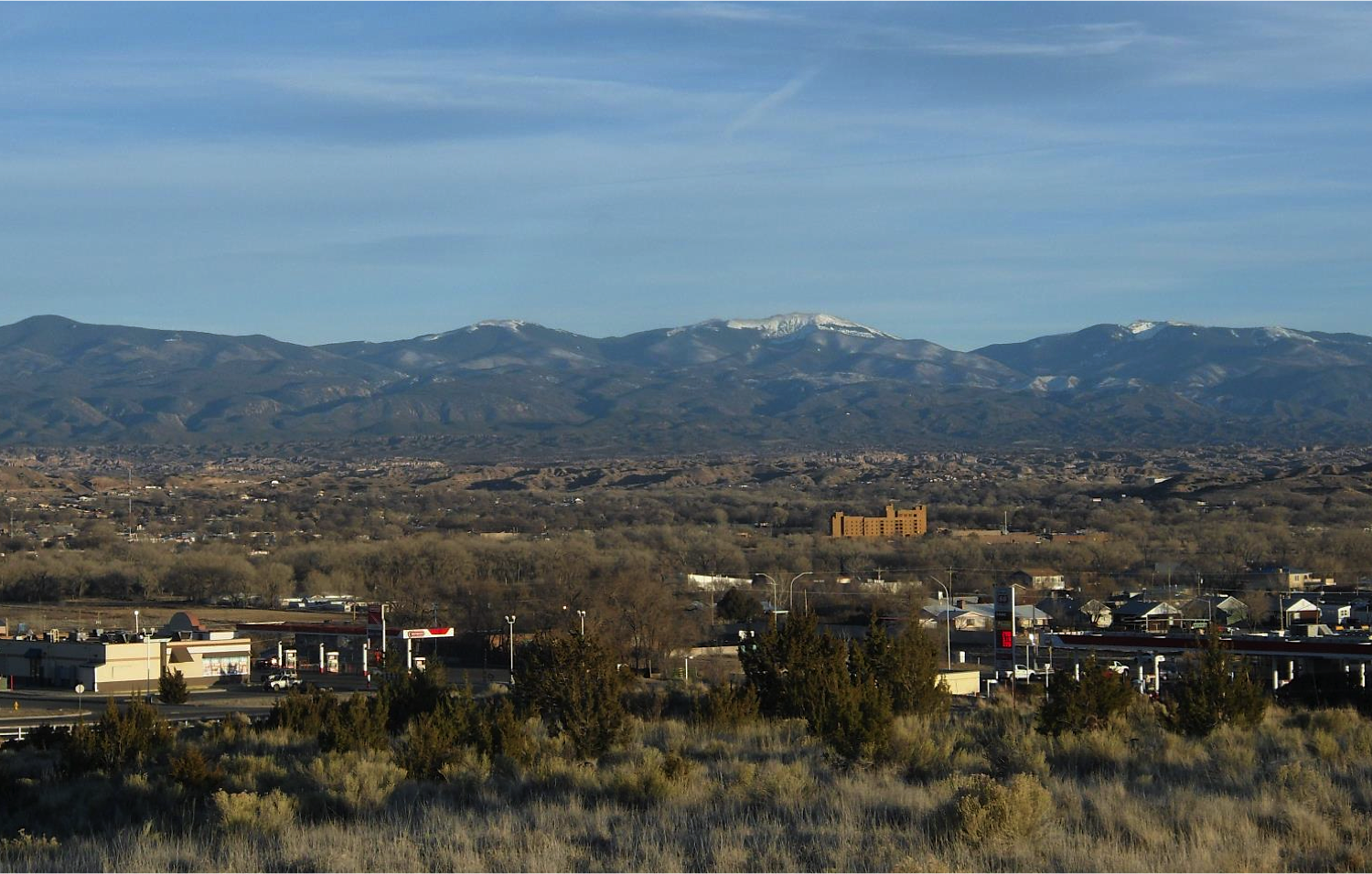
- Skyline view from the city's Industrial Park

- Seal
- Etymology: Founded as San Juan de los Caballeros, as capital of Nuevo México for Española (Spanish)
- Nickname: "The Low Rider Capital of The World", Spaña
- Motto: The heart of northern New Mexico...where cultures unite.
- Location of Española, New Mexico

- Location in the United States
- Coordinates: 36°00′07″N 106°03′58″W
- Country: United States
- State: New Mexico
- County: Rio Arriba, Santa Fe
- Founded: 1598
- Incorporated: 1925
- Named for: See history section

Government
  - Type: Mayor-council government
  - Mayor: Dennis Tim Salazar
  - City Council: Councilors: Aaron J. Salazar; Pedro Valdez; Peggy Sue Martinez; Felicia A. Archuleta-Toya; Justin J. Salazar-Torrez; Stephen S. Salazar; Manuel J. Martinez; Samuel Z. LeDoux
  - State House: Representatives: Susan K. Herrera (D); Joseph Sanchez (D); Andrea Romero (D)
  - State Senate: State senators: Leo Jaramillo (D)
  - U.S. House: Representative: Teresa Leger Fernandez (D)

Area
  - Total: 8.34 sq mi (21.61 km^{2})
  - Land: 8.22 sq mi (21.30 km^{2})
  - Water: 0.12 sq mi (0.31 km^{2})
- Elevation: 5,591 ft (1,704 m)

Population (2020)
  - Total: 10,526
  - Density: 1,280.2/sq mi (494.29/km^{2})
- Time zone: UTC-07:00 (MST)
  - Summer (DST): UTC-06:00 (MDT)
- ZIP codes: 87532, 87533
- Area code: 505
- FIPS code: 35-25170
- GNIS feature ID: 2410456
- Website: www.espanolanmusa.org

Española /ɛspənˈjoʊlə/ is a city primarily in Rio Arriba County, New Mexico, United States. A portion of the central and eastern section of the city is in Santa Fe County. Founded as a railroad village, it was named Española, with a post office established in 1881, and officially incorporated in 1925. It has been called the first capital city in the United States. As of the 2020 census, the population was at 10,526. Española is within the Albuquerque–Santa Fe–Los Alamos combined statistical area. The city is home to Northern New Mexico College. Much of the town lies within the boundaries of Santa Clara Pueblo.

== History ==
=== Etymology ===
Española was referred to as La Vega de los Vigiles ('the Vigils' Meadow') before the arrival of the railroad. The source of the current name is disputed: La Española means 'Spanish woman', and folk history attributes the name to railroad construction workers who named the area after a woman who worked in a small restaurant in the area. Alternatively, it may be a variation of Hispaniola (New Spain), or as a shortened form of Plaza Española ('Spanish town'), which likely was to differentiate it from the Tewa pueblos to the north and south.

=== Spanish settlement ===
Tewa people have lived in the area since the 13th century. They built towns in the area, now called Pueblos, five of which still exist: Ohkay Owingeh, Pojoaque, Nambé, Santa Clara and San Ildefonso.

The upper reaches of the Rio Grande region were explored by the Spanish in 1540. Don Juan de Oñate was the first to bring settlers here in 1598. His group stayed at Ohkay Owingeh for a time (calling the Tewa town San Juan de los Caballeros), before settling in an abandoned Tewa village which he renamed San Gabriel. San Gabriel, close to modern Española, can thus be seen as the first capital city founded by people of European racial descent in what is now the United States.

Oñate arrived in the Española area on July 11, 1598, at the confluence of the Chama River and the Rio Grande, where he established a camp at a place then called Yunque-Yunque.

Almost a century later, near the same region, Don Diego de Vargas established his villa at Santa Cruz.

=== Railroad era ===
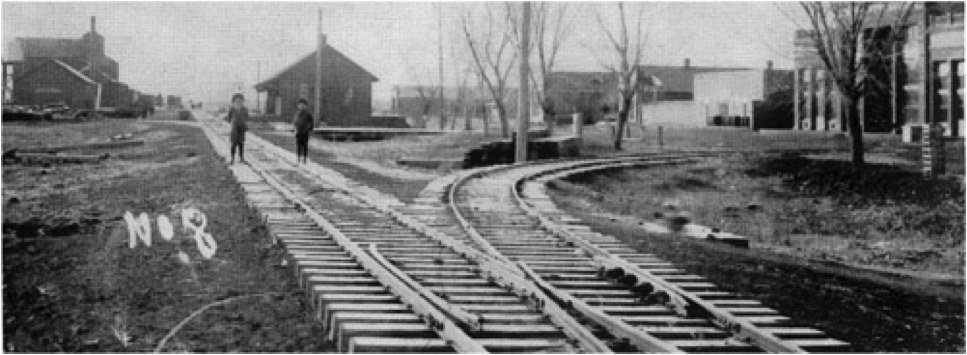
Downtown Española, 1885

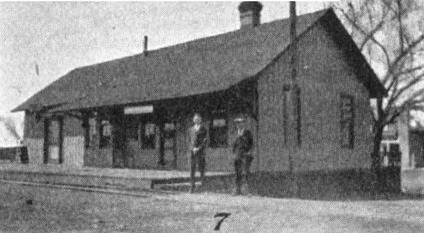
The Española train depot, 1920

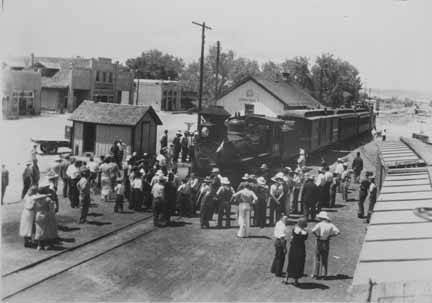
During filming in Española of The Texas Rangers (1936)

Prior to the arrival from Antonito, Colorado of the narrow gauge Denver and Rio Grande Railroad in 1880, the hamlet on the west-side of the Rio Grande was known as La Vega de los Vigiles in reference to the Vigil family, who initially settled that area. The earliest document found indicates that La Vegas de los Vigiles had been populated by 1751, over 100 years before the railroad's arrival. With the coming of the railroad, the name of the hamlet was changed to Española. Until 1886, when it was extended to Santa Fe, Española was the terminus of the line. The Española station included an engine facility along with a roundhouse and turntable so it could service the locomotives. The facilities were built but torn down or no longer in use after six years; plans for the town had changed. Later popularly known as the "Chili Line", this was part of an ambitious but unsuccessful proposal to connect Denver with Mexico City.

The route extended into what today is the downtown Española area, and the railroad began selling lots in the area. Anglo merchants, mountain men, and settlers slowly filtered into Española's predominantly Hispanic population. Frank Bond and his brother George, who were Canadian emigrants, would later arrive in the city. Together they established the state's largest mercantile and a multi–million dollar wool empire. With them came economic growth and prominence. Española was the headquarters for all the Bond family interests, which included over 12 businesses across New Mexico.

Frank R. Frankenburger, a businessman born in Fort Scott, Kansas, was the first "elected" mayor; he was elected in 1923. The first mayor who was chosen by "popularity" was Frank Bond in 1907. In 1925, Española was incorporated as a city. As the population rose, there was a high demand for public education in the city. Española High School was established; it would be the largest school in the area for decades. The first high school in the area, however, was Santa Cruz High School. Two miles away from downtown Española, it opened in 1906 in the historic Santa Cruz area. Neither high school operates after a merger of school districts in 1975.

The importance of the railroad began to lessen as minimal passenger traffic and low shipments forced the railroad to close in 1941, with the tracks removed the following year. Many locals would become unemployed and would follow the railroad to Santa Fe, Albuquerque and central Colorado for jobs. Española's population would fall dramatically, and many homes in the downtown became abandoned. Most of the locals who remained would turn to farming as a way of life. Many people saw Española as another failed railroad town. The city removed the railroad tracks and the train depot in the 1960s, and the railroads completely vanished.

Businesses in Española vigorously opposed the abandonment of the D&RGW's narrow gauge in the early 1940s. Their calls for continued rail service were at odds with the grim realities of the marketplace, which had for years rendered the "Chili Line" woefully unprofitable. Although Española was an integral part of the saga of railroad construction in the West, it was destined to become one of the region's first notable communities bereft of its trains.

— When the Railroad Leaves Town, –Joseph P. Schwieterman
American communities in the age of the rail line abandonment

=== Post-railroad era ===
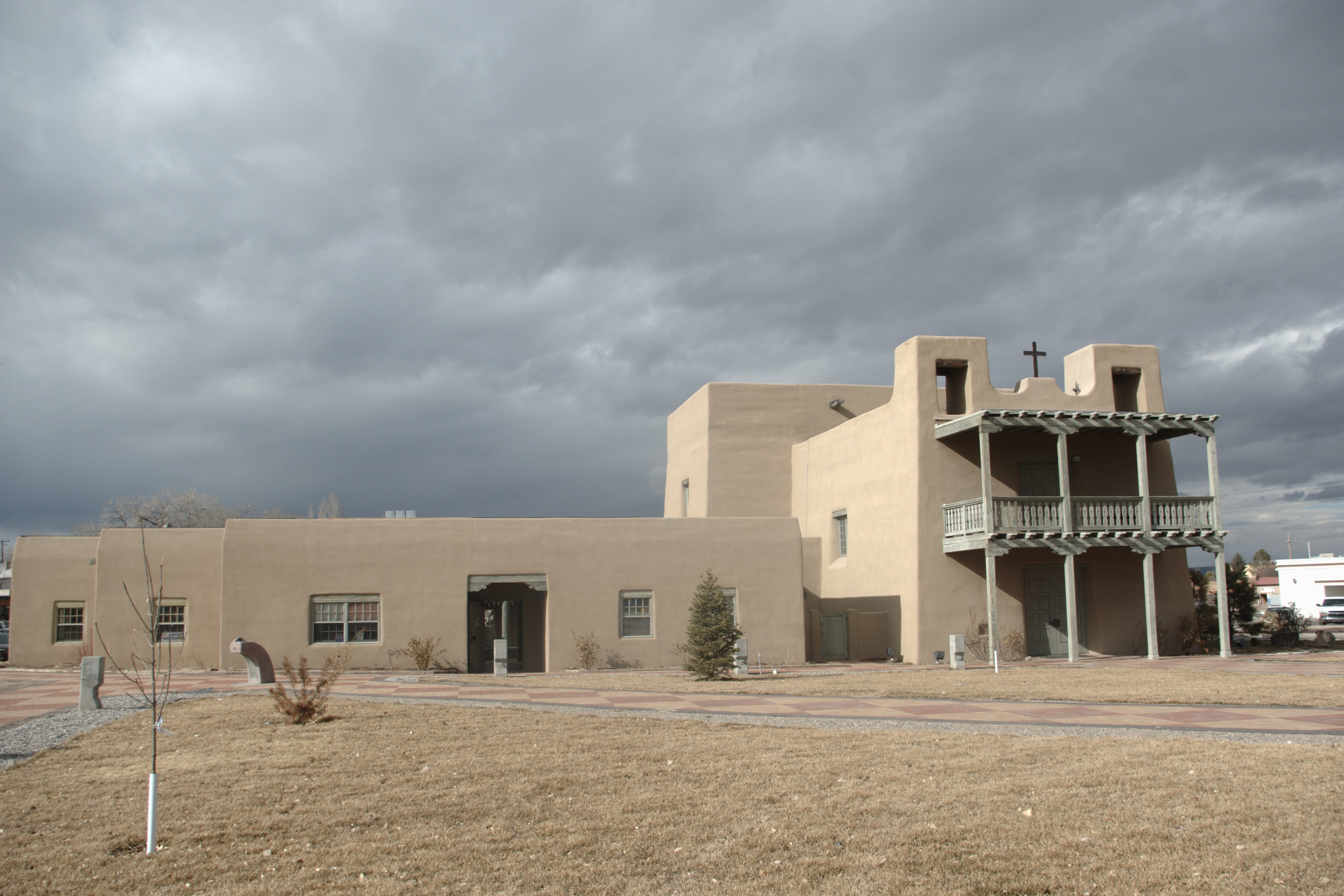
Española Plaza

With the beginnings of Manhattan Project in nearby Los Alamos, many locals eventually found jobs at the Los Alamos National Laboratory (LANL). As many as nearly 9% of Española's population have been employed at LANL.

Circa 1970-1980, an influx of illegal drugs from México to Española, N.M., specifically black tar heroin and brown powder heroin, resulted in the Española Valley becoming the epicenter for the largest number of illegal drug-related overdose deaths in the U.S.A. during the later part of the 20th century.

In the 1990s, a plaza and mission church were built to pay tribute to the Spanish culture in the area.

Nambé Mills, originally established in 1951 in Pojaque as a producer of high quality metal cookware and tableware, relocated its foundry to Espanola in 1994, and employed a large number of people. The foundry work was later moved abroad to Asia.

On September 18, 2008, then Democrat candidate Barack Obama campaigned in Española with a rally at the city's New Plaza in the Main Street district.

=== Española in the 21st Century ===
Between 2023 and 2025, police calls in Española and surrounding areas doubled, and police dispatches to area businesses quadrupled. In 2025, the governor declared a state of emergency in Española and nearby areas due to a rise in drug trafficking and violent crime.

== Geography ==
According to the United States Census Bureau, the city has a total area of 21.9 square kilometers (8.5 sq mi), with 21.7 square kilometers (8.4 sq mi) land and 0.2 square kilometers (0.077 sq mi) water, for a total of 0.83%.

Española lies at an elevation of around 5,595 feet (1,705 m) with much variance. It is in a valley nestled between the Jemez and Sangre de Cristo mountain ranges, and the meeting point of three rivers, the Rio Grande, the Rio Chama, and the Rio Santa Cruz.

=== Climate ===
Española has a borderline cool semi-arid climate (Köppen BSk)/cool desert climate (BWk). The main Española weather station is hotter and drier than nearby cities due to its relatively lower altitude, lying over 1,300 feet or 400 metres lower than Taos or county seat Tierra Amarilla.

July is the hottest month, with an average high of 91 °F or 32.8 °C. The highest recorded temperature was 107 °F or 41.7 °C in 2003. The average coolest month is January at 45 °F or 7.2 °C. The lowest recorded temperature was −38 °F or −38.9 °C in 1971. The maximum average precipitation occurs in August with an average of 1.90 inches (48 mm).

Climate data for Española, New Mexico
Month	Jan	Feb	Mar	Apr	May	Jun	Jul	Aug	Sep	Oct	Nov	Dec	Year
Record high °F (°C)	67 (19)	75 (24)	84 (29)	88 (31)	98 (37)	105 (41)	107 (42)	103 (39)	99 (37)	89 (32)	84 (29)	72 (22)	107 (42)
Mean daily maximum °F (°C)	45 (7)	52 (11)	60 (16)	69 (21)	78 (26)	88 (31)	91 (33)	87 (31)	81 (27)	72 (22)	58 (14)	47 (8)	69 (21)
Mean daily minimum °F (°C)	14 (−10)	20 (−7)	26 (−3)	33 (1)	41 (5)	50 (10)	57 (14)	55 (13)	47 (8)	34 (1)	24 (−4)	15 (−9)	35 (2)
Record low °F (°C)	−38 (−39)	−18 (−28)	0 (−18)	14 (−10)	17 (−8)	28 (−2)	35 (2)	37 (3)	25 (−4)	10 (−12)	−21 (−29)	−16 (−27)	−38 (−39)
Average precipitation inches (mm)	0.40 (10)	0.40 (10)	0.60 (15)	0.60 (15)	0.70 (18)	0.70 (18)	1.60 (41)	1.90 (48)	1.20 (30)	0.90 (23)	0.60 (15)	0.50 (13)	10.1 (256)
Source: weather.com

== Demographics ==
Historical population
Census	Pop.	Note	%±
1890	398		—
1900	1,405		253.0%
1910	1,802		28.3%
1920	2,412		33.9%
1930	4,269		77.0%
1940	2,984		−30.1%
1950	2,489		−16.6%
1960	3,472		39.5%
1970	7,923		128.2%
1980	8,127		2.6%
1990	8,828		8.6%
2000	9,504		7.7%
2010	10,495		10.4%
2020	10,526		0.3%
U.S. Decennial Census

=== 2020 census ===
As of the 2020 census, Española had a population of 10,526. The median age was 39.1 years. 22.8% of residents were under the age of 18, and 17.7% of residents were 65 years of age or older. For every 100 females there were 90.5 males, and for every 100 females age 18 and over there were 88.5 males age 18 and over.

98.3% of residents lived in urban areas, while 1.7% lived in rural areas.

There were 4,177 households in Española, of which 34.9% had children under the age of 18 living in them. Of all households, 32.7% were married-couple households, 22.0% were households with a male householder and no spouse or partner present, and 34.8% were households with a female householder and no spouse or partner present. About 28.8% of all households were made up of individuals, and 13.3% had someone living alone who was 65 years of age or older.

There were 4,574 housing units, of which 8.7% were vacant. The homeowner vacancy rate was 1.0%, and the rental vacancy rate was 4.9%.

Racial composition as of the 2020 census
Race	Number	Percent
White	3,765	35.8%
Black or African American	69	0.7%
American Indian and Alaska Native	430	4.1%
Asian	151	1.4%
Native Hawaiian and Other Pacific Islander	4	0.0%
Some other race	2,854	27.1%
Two or more races	3,253	30.9%
Hispanic or Latino (of any race)	8,775	83.4%

=== 2010 census ===
As of the census of 2010, there were 10,224 residing in the city.

The racial makeup of the city was:

- 8.8% White (alone)
- 0.3% Black or African American
- 2.3% Native American
- 1.0% Asian
- 0.1% from other races
- 0.4% multiracial (two or more races)
- 87.1% of the population were Hispanics or Latinos (of any race)

=== 2000 census ===
At the census of 2000, there were 9,688 people, 5,751 households, and 4,569 families residing in the city. The population density was 1,155.4 inhabitants per square mile (446.1/km^{2}). There were 5,107 housing units at an average density of 189.2/square kilometer (489.8/square mile). The racial makeup of the city was 67.55% White, 0.58% African American, 2.86% Native American, 0.14% Asian, 0.06% Pacific Islander, 25.56% from other races, and 3.25% from two or more races. 84.38% of the population were Hispanic or Latino of any race.

There were 5,751 households, of which 35.6% had children under the age of eighteen living with them, 42.5% were married couples living together, 18.5% had a female householder with no husband present, and 31.5% were non-families. 26.2% of all households were made up of single individuals, and 9.7% had someone living alone who was sixty-five years of age or older. The average household size was 2.56, and the average family size was 3.08.

In the city, the population was spread out, with 27.8% under the age of 18, 9.7% from 18 to 24, 28.1% from 25 to 44, 22.1% from 45 to 64, and 12.3% who were 65 years of age or older. The median age was thirty-four years. For every 100 females, there were 95.3 males. For every 100 females aged eighteen and over, there were 94.6 males.

The median income for a household in the city was $27,144, and the median income for a family was $32,255. Males had a median income of $25,558 versus $23,177 for females. The per capita income for the city was $14,303. 21.6% of the population and 16.5% of families were below the poverty line. Out of the total population, 28.4% of those under the age of eighteen and 15.1% of those sixty-five and older were living below the poverty line.

== Economy ==
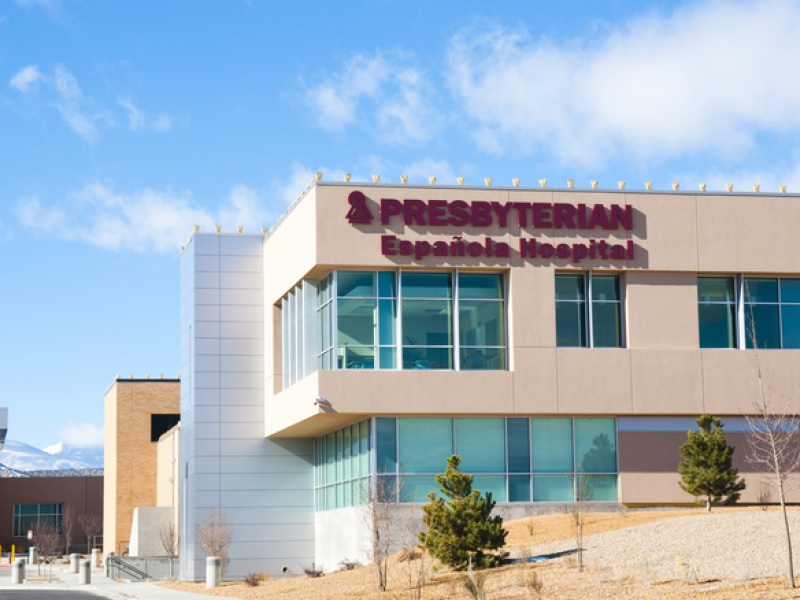
Presbyterian Hospital, 2013, after expansion

The Los Alamos National Laboratory is the largest employer in Española; it accounts for over 12% employment of residents. The education sector is the second largest employer, and the Española Public Schools is the 16th largest school district in New Mexico. Recently, Northern New Mexico College has expanded its degree programs and made massive improvements to its campus, adding a new library and a new School of Education. Larger local businesses include Akal Securities Inc, a security company that employs over 500 people.

== Arts and culture ==
=== Plaza de Española ===
The fountain at Plaza de Española was designed as a replica of the Alhambra. The plaza is home to the Convent Mission, administered by the Episcopal Church.

=== Library ===
Española Public Library contains a collection of about 50,000 items.

== Parks and recreation ==
=== Recreational facilities ===
- Penny Roybal Garcia (Ranchitos) Aquatic Center
- Richard L. Lucero Recreation Center

=== Major community parks ===
- Plaza de Española Park
- Vietnam Veteran's Memorial Park
- Ranchitos Park
- Valdez Park (dedicated in memory of Española native Phil Valdez)

== Government ==
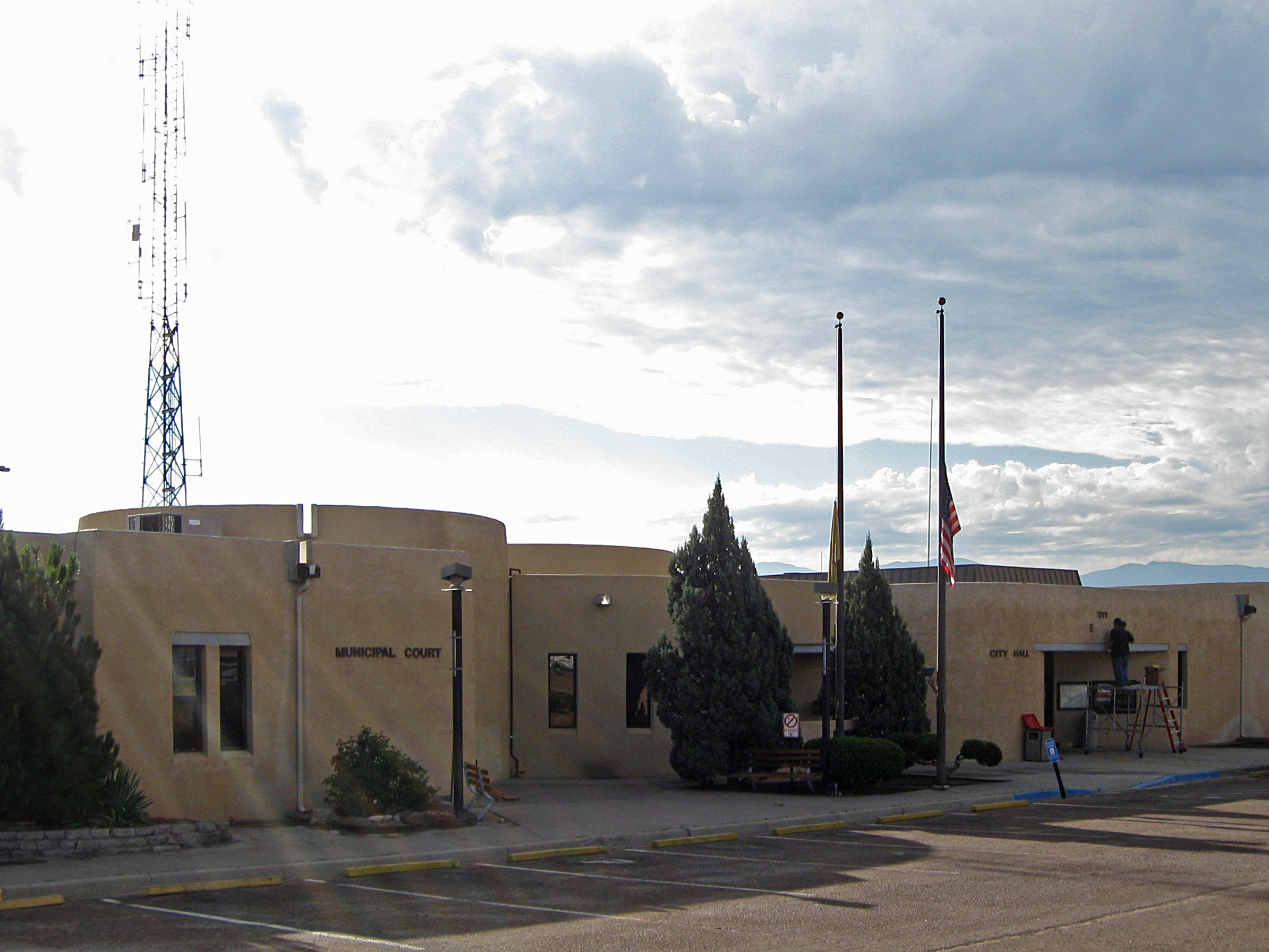
Government complex

The city of Española is run by a mayor–council government system under a strong-mayor form. The mayor and eight-member city councilors from their respective districts are elected to a four-year term; elections are held every two years, with no term limits. The mayor appoints a city manager who supervises department heads, prepares the budget, and coordinates departments.

Every two years during the organizational meeting, one council member is elected by a majority in the council to serve as mayor pro–tem, usually a member from the party that is in control of the council.

In the 2026 municipal election, Dennis Tim Salazar was elected mayor of Española.

== Education ==
=== Public schools ===
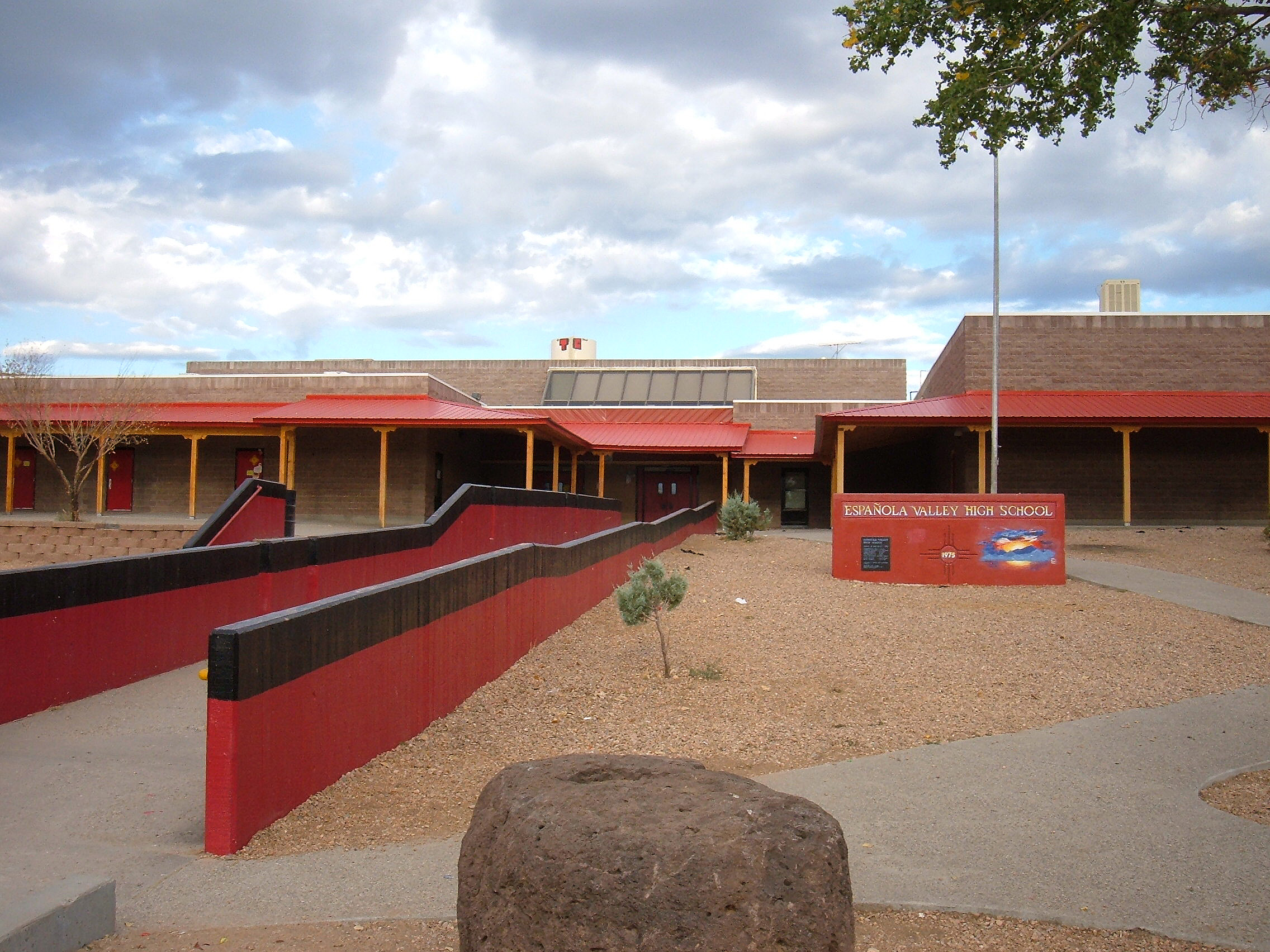
Española Valley High School

The City of Española is a part of the Española Public Schools district, with six of its 14 schools being located within the city.

Secondary schools:

- Española Valley High School
- Carlos F. Vigil Middle School

Elementary schools:

- Eutimio Tim Salazar III "Fairview" Elementary
- James H. Rodriguez "Española" Elementary
- Tony E. Quintana "Sombrillo" Elementary

=== Charter and tribal schools ===
- McCurdy Charter School K-12
- La Tierra Montesori School of the Arts and Sciences
- Carinos de los Ninos Charter School

Private schools:

- Holy Cross Catholic School (Roman Catholic Archdiocese of Santa Fe)
- Victory Faith Christian Academy

College:

- Northern New Mexico College

== Infrastructure ==
Law enforcement is provided by the Española Police Department.

The Española Fire/Rescue Department became a paid fire department in 1998. The department employs 15 full-time firefighters.

== Notable people ==
- Jack Aeby (1923–2015), environmental physicist
- Eppie Archuleta (1922–2014), weaver and textile artist
- Frank Bond (1863–1945), businessman
- Kenneth J. Gonzales (born 1964), attorney and judge
- Robert B. Hall (1896–1975), geographer
- Shel Hershon (1929–2011), photojournalist
- Leo Jaramillo, politician
- Harbhajan Singh Khalsa (1929–2004), Sikh yogi
- Hari Jiwan Singh Khalsa, Sikh leader
- Patricia D. Lopez, computer scientist
- Richard Lucero (1935–2024), politician
- Joseph Maestas (born 1960 or 1961), politician and engineer
- Joe Mondragon (1920–1987), jazz musician
- Roger Montoya (born 1961), humanitarian, artist, gymnast and politician
- The Movin' Morfomen, rock band
- Nora Naranjo Morse (born 1953), artist and poet
- Satya Rhodes-Conway (born 1971), politician
- Debbie Rodella (born 1961), politician
- Raemer Schreiber (1910–1998), physicist
- Jacobo de la Serna (born 1965), ceramic artist
- Scott Tipton (born 1956), politician

== In popular culture ==
Española serves as the setting for the 2023 black comedy series The Curse, which explores the gentrification of the area.

== See also ==
- List of municipalities in New Mexico
