= Jenelle Roybal =

Governor of the Pueblo of Pojoaque

Jenelle Roybal is the governor of the Pueblo of Pojoaque in Northern New Mexico. The Pojoaque Pueblo (P’o-suwae-geh Owingeh in the Tewa language meaning "water drinking place village") is a federally recognized tribe, and the pueblo is a sovereign nation with its own government, culture, traditions and lifeways.

== Education and early life ==
Roybal was raised by her grandmother who she credits as inspiration for her to become a leader. She received a Bachelor of Arts in Business Administration Management from Northern New Mexico College. She is the sole woman to serve as a governor of a Pueblo.

== Career ==
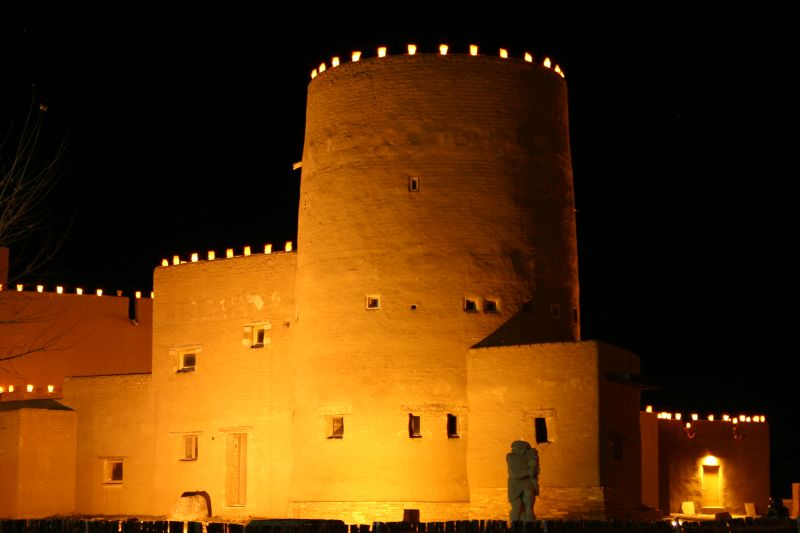
Poeh Museum in Pojoque, New Mexico at night illuminated by luminarias

Roybal began working for the Pueblo of Pojoaque in 1994 when she was 15 years old. She held positions in the Pueblo's Education Department and the Human Resources department before being elected as Lieutenant Governor in 2014. She served for six years in that role before being elected as Governor.

In 2023 she was appointed by the state of New Mexico to lead, in conjunction with Picuris Pueblo governor Craig Quancello, the Advisory Council of the Missing and Murdered Indigenous Persons task force. The council works with law enforcement to advocate for those who have experienced murdered or missing family members.

Roybal's service as governor focuses on the wellbeing of tribal members, in terms of access to housing, food, water resources, education and medical care. She oversaw the opening of Wō Poví Cannabis, the first tribal-run cannabis dispensary in New Mexico. All of the profits made by Wō Poví Cannabis go to fund education.

== Personal life ==
Roybal has four children and two puppies the breeds of the puppies are a Japanese Chin (Ozzy) And a Miniature Pinscher (Chase).

== See also ==
- All Pueblo Council of Governors
- List of Native American politicians
- Native American women in politics
