= Yolanda Jaramillo =

American politician from New Mexico

Member of the New Mexico House of Representatives from the 41st district
- Incumbent
- Assumed office 2026
- Preceded by: Susan Herrera

Personal details
- Born: Dixon, New Mexico, U.S.
- Party: Democratic
- Education: New Mexico Highlands University (BA)
- Occupation: Educator
- Website: Legislative website
- Nickname: Pancha

Yolanda "Pancha" Jaramillo is an American politician and educator who has served as a member of the New Mexico House of Representatives for the 41st district since 2026. A member of the Democratic Party, she won the 2026 Democratic primary for the open seat and was appointed to finish the term of Susan Herrera, who resigned early. Before entering the legislature, Jaramillo was an officer of a local acequia in Dixon and a member of the New Mexico Acequia Commission.

== Early life and education ==
Jaramillo was born and raised in Dixon, an unincorporated community in Rio Arriba County. She earned a Bachelor of Arts in Spanish and theater from New Mexico Highlands University and a Master of Arts in Spanish literature, and completed a year of doctoral study in linguistics and Latin American literature at the University of New Mexico.

== Career ==
Jaramillo taught at New Mexico Highlands University and the University of New Mexico, as well as at secondary schools in New Mexico and in Houston.

She has been secretary and treasurer of La Acequia de La Plaza de Dixon since 2009. In 2010 she joined the board of directors of the New Mexico Acequia Association, and in 2024 Governor Michelle Lujan Grisham appointed her to the New Mexico Acequia Commission.

=== New Mexico House of Representatives ===
In February 2026, Jaramillo filed to run in the Democratic primary for the 41st district, an open seat after Herrera announced she would not seek reelection. The district includes parts of Rio Arriba, Sandoval, Santa Fe and Taos counties, including the communities of Dixon, Abiquiú, Tres Piedras, Tierra Amarilla and Chama. Her opponent in the primary was former representative Debbie Rodella, who had held the seat from 1993 until Herrera defeated her in the 2018 Democratic primary.

Herrera endorsed Jaramillo in March 2026, citing disagreements with Rodella over predatory lending, guns and reproductive rights. She also accused Rodella of having lobbied for predatory lenders, a characterization Rodella disputed. Jaramillo won the June 2 primary with about 55 percent of the roughly 5,500 votes cast. No Republican filed for the seat, leaving her unopposed in the November general election.

Herrera resigned effective July 27, 2026, so that her successor could take office before the next legislative session. Under state law, the county commission of each county in the district recommends a replacement, and the governor makes the appointment. The Santa Fe County Commission voted to recommend Jaramillo on August 11, 2026. She was appointed to the seat later in 2026. Her interim committee assignments include advisory seats on the Water and Natural Resources Committee and the Land Grant Committee.

== Political positions ==
During the 2026 campaign, Jaramillo named the economy as the most important issue facing the district and called for expanding trades training. She also supported more funding for early childhood education and for behavioral health and suicide prevention programs in schools. She supports paying New Mexico legislators a salary, arguing that it would let people from working families serve, and has said the salary should be tied to the state's median income. She also supports term limits. She has described herself as a progressive Democrat.
