= NNMC =

NNMC may refer to:

- National Naval Medical Center, a forerunner of the Walter Reed National Military Medical Center, in the United States
- Northern New Mexico College, in Espanola, New Mexico
