= All Pueblo Council of Governors =

Non-profit organization for 20 Pueblo nations

- Predecessor: All Indian Pueblo Council
- Headquarters: New Mexico
- Chairman: James R. Mountain
- Vice Chairman: Dominic Gauchupin
- Secretary: Arden Kucate
- Website: apcg.org

The All Pueblo Council of Governors (formerly the All Indian Pueblo Council) is a non-profit Puebloan leadership organization and political entity. It comprises the 20 Pueblos – 19 across New Mexico and one in Texas and works on legislative, cultural and government issues. Some of the issues members fight for are the Pueblo Land Claims Act and the Indian Civil Rights Acts of 1968. They advocate for the sovereign rights of the Puebloan people and promote educational and economic advancement of the Pueblo nations. The council works to preserve the language, culture and traditions of the 20 pueblos.

The current chairman of the council is James R. Mountain of San Ildefonso Pueblo, who replaced Wilfred Herrera, Jr., of Laguna Pueblo.

== Pueblos represented ==
Each pueblo has their own sovereign authority with which to govern their affairs.

New Mexico pueblos:

- Acoma Pueblo, Governor Charles P. Riley
- Cochiti Pueblo, Governor Joseph B. Herrera
- Isleta Pueblo, Governor Eugene Jiron
- Jemez Pueblo, Governor George Shendo, Jr.
- Laguna Pueblo, Governor Harry Antonio, Jr.
- Nambe Pueblo, Governor Nathaniel S. Porter
- Ohkay Owingeh (San Juan Pueblo), Governor Ben Lujan
- Picuris Pueblo, Governor Wayne Yazza
- Pojoaque Pueblo, Governor Jenelle Roybal
- San Felipe Pueblo, Governor Anthony Ortiz
- San Ildefonso Pueblo, Governor Christopher Moquino
- Sandia Pueblo, Governor Felix L. Chavez
- Santa Ana Pueblo, Governor Myron Armijo
- Santa Clara Pueblo, Governor James Naranjo
- Santo Domingo Pueblo, Governor Thomas Moquino, Jr.
- Taos Pueblo, Governor Edwin Concha
- Tesuque Pueblo, Governor Earl Samuel
- Zia Pueblo, Governor Lambert Pino
- Zuni Pueblo, Governor Arden Kucate

Texas Pueblo:

- Ysleta del Sur Pueblo, Governor E. Michael Silvas

== See also ==
- Indian Pueblo Cultural Center
