= Patricia D. Lopez =

American computer scientist

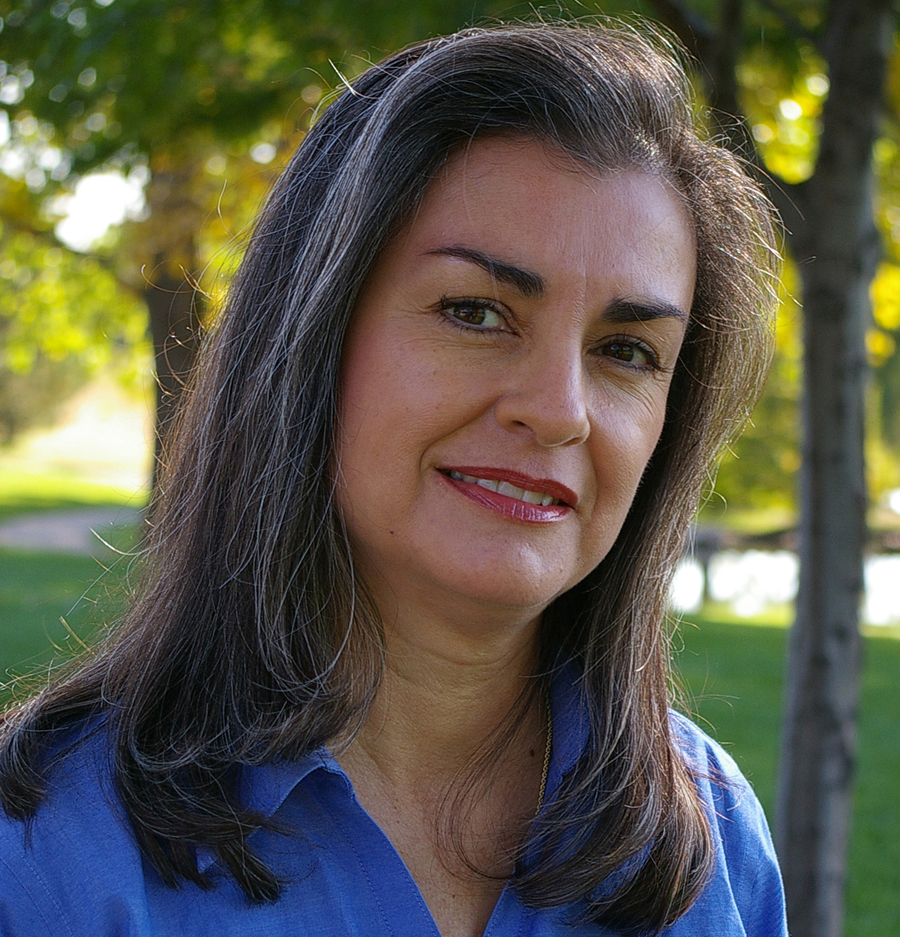
- Patricia (Patty) D. Lopez
- Born: Española, New Mexico, US
- Education: New Mexico State University
- Known for: computer vision image processing
- Awards: HP Technical Leadership Award (2001)
- Scientific career
- Fields: Computer Science
- Workplaces: Intel Corporation; Hewlett Packard Company
- Doctoral advisor: Mike Coombs

Patricia Diane Lopez (Patty Lopez) is an American computer scientist noted for her research on computer vision, image processing, and image enhancement. Her most notable work is her early efforts on neural networks, modeling human vision and imaging patents.

She is also noted for her leadership in broadening participation in computing. She is a founding member of Latinas in Computing, serves on the CAHSI, Anita Borg Institute, and CRA-W Boards, and was the Grace Hopper Celebration of Women in Computing 2013 General Co-Chair.

== Biography ==
Lopez received three degrees from New Mexico State University, a B.S. in Computer Science with honors in 1980, a M.S. in Computer Science with a minor in EE and Psychology in 1982, and a Ph.D in Computer Science in 1989. From 1983-1989 she was part of the Vision and Robotics group at New Mexico State University. In 1989 she joined Hewlett Packard Co. as an R&D Software Design Engineer developing image processing algorithms and photo imaging software, and in 2000 as an Imaging Scientist responsible for new imaging technologies. In 2008, she moved to Intel Corporation as a Component Design Engineer for Logic Validation and in 2010 as a Platform Applications Engineer for the Mission Critical Data Center. Anita Borg Institute wrote a biography about her.

== Awards ==
Her notable awards include:

- James F. Cole Memorial Award for Service, New Mexico State University Alumni Association, 2018
- SWE Advocating Women in Engineering Award 2015
- Great Minds in STEM/HENAAC, Community Service Award, 2010 - Award winners have demonstrated leadership in the minority engineering, science, and technology community through volunteer work, contributions and other activities that are not part of their current job description
- Hewlett Packard Diversity and Inclusion Award, 2004
- New Mexico State University Distinguished Alumna, College of Arts and Sciences, Technical, 2003
- Hewlett Packard Campus Recognition Program Award, 2003
- Hewlett Packard Technical Leadership Award, 2001
