= Andrea Romero =

American politician

Member of the New Mexico House of Representatives from the 46th district
- Incumbent
- Assumed office January 15, 2019
- Preceded by: Carl Trujillo

Personal details
- Born: Santa Fe, New Mexico, U.S.
- Party: Democratic
- Education: Stanford University (BA); University of New Mexico School of Law (JD)

Andrea Romero is an American politician, lawyer, and entrepreneur serving as a member of the New Mexico House of Representatives from the 46th district, which includes part of Santa Fe County.

== Early life and education ==
Romero was born and raised in Santa Fe, New Mexico and Española, New Mexico. Romero earned a Bachelor of Arts degree in political science from Stanford University and a J.D. from the University of New Mexico School of Law.

== Career ==
Romero returned to New Mexico after working in Mozambique and Washington, DC she started her own management consulting firm and established Tall Foods (now Flobiotik Foods), a food startup that produces probiotics through eggs. Romero owns the patent in probiotic eggs. She works as an entrepreneur, lawyer, and management consultant with for- and non-profits.

Romero defeated incumbent Democrat Carl Trujillo for her House seat and took office on January 15, 2019. Romero is a progressive Democrat, having supported gun safety, climate change efforts, cannabis legalization and expungement, abortion and transgender rights, immigrant rights, and survivors of sexual violence. Since 2018, Romero has campaigned on a gun safety platform, gaining the endorsements of Everytown for Gun Safety and Giffords.

Governor Michelle Lujan Grisham called legislators into a special session in 2021, where Romero sponsored cannabis expungement laws and co-sponsored recreational legalization. In 2022, she sponsored a ban on assault weapons and a waiting period for gun purchases.

While she was a candidate for the 2018 election, Romero was criticized for travel expense reimbursements for purchasing baseball tickets and alcoholic beverages. Then-state auditor, Wayne Johnson, released the results of an audit on the company, which revealed that Romero had not acted improperly and she was defended by then House Speaker Brian Egolf.

As a climate advocate, Romero has co-sponsored state legislation to advance renewable energy and protect New Mexico's limited clean water supplies. Internationally, she participated in the UN Climate Change Conferences, COP29 (Baku, Azerbaijan) and COP30 (Belem, Brazil), representing Elected Officials to Protect America and advancing energy security plans for war-torn Ukraine.

In February 2026, Romero gained prominence as the chair of the so-called Epstein Truth Commission to investigate sex-trafficking accusations about Jeffrey Epstein and his Zorro Ranch property in rural Santa Fe County.
