= The Movin' Morfomen =

American garage rock/psychedelic band

- Origin: Espanola, New Mexico, United States
- Genres: Garage rock; psychedelic
- Years active: 1965-1970
- Labels: Delta, Delta Nel-Ric, Tewa
- Past members: Dave Rarick; Rudy Maestas; Anthony Martinez; Danny Gavurnick; Ed Valdez

The Movin' Morfomen (or sometimes credited as the Morfomen) were an American garage rock and psychedelic band from Espanola, New Mexico, who active in the 1960s. They became one of the most popular acts in New Mexico and had several local and regional hits. They are well-regarded by garage rock and psychedelic enthusiasts, and their collected works appear on the Flashbacks! anthology, issued in 1997.

== History ==
The Movin’ Morfomen were formed in 1965, Espanola, New Mexico, north of Santa Fe by high school students at Espanola High School. Their lineup consisted of Dave Rarick on vocals, guitar, and keyboards, Rudy Maestas on vocals and guitar, Anthony Martinez on bass, Danny Gavurnick on vocals, guitar and trumpet, and Ed Valdez on drums. Rarick wrote most of the band's original songs. Their sound was influenced by the Beatles, as American bands such as the Standells, and their sound varied from the highly primitive to the more melodic, as the band's members were adept with, not only crunching guitar chords, but also three part harmonies. Their name came about through a roadie nicknamed "Morfo, " who was a fan of monster movies and enjoyed doing imitations the "creatures" who appeared in the movies. On one occasion, the band was booked to a gig but lacked a name, so they hastily Christened themselves the Movin' Morfomen.

As the Movin' Morfomen, they released several singles, beginning with "Run Girl Run" b/w "When You Were Mine" on Delta Records in February 1967, followed by "Don't Go Baby" b/w "Only the Young" later that year on Lance Records. Several of their songs became hits on New Mexico radio stations and they became a popular draw in the region. They began to adopt psychedelic influences into their sound, but after 1967 the band played less regularly as various members became active in other pursuits, but they continued to record and play occasional shows and expand their musical horizons in the studio. In 1968 they released a single featuring the ostensibly sex and drug-referenced "We Tried, Try It" on the Nel-Ric label, largely based on the controversial song "Try It" originally recorded by the Ohio Express and later covered by the Standells. By July 1969, the group had essentially ceased as working unit, but several of its core members made occasional visits in the studio, releasing their final single, "Write Me a Letter" b/w "When Wise Men Cry" recorded in Clovis, NM at Norman Petty Studios in January 1970, the single being released in March 1970. By the end of 1970, the group was no more.

During the 1990s, former members Dave Rarick, Dan Gavurnik, and Ed Valdez performed in New Mexico as the Flashbacks. The Movin' Morfomen's work has come to the attention of garage rock and psychedelic enthusiasts with the 1997 anthology, Flashbacks!, issued by Collectibles Records, which includes their complete recorded works (as well as several songs by the Flashbacks) that, in addition to their rocking numbers, also showcases their versatility.

== Membership ==
- Dave Rarick (vocals, guitar, and keyboards)
- Rudy Maestas (vocals and guitar),
- Anthony Martinez (bass)
- Danny Gavurnick (vocals, guitar and trumpet)
- Ed Valdez (drums)

== Discography ==
- "Run Girl Run" b/w "When You Were Mine" (Delta 2242, February 1967)
- "Don't Go Baby" b/w "Only the Young" (Lance 107, May 1967)
- "We Tried, Try It" b/w "Distant Drums" (Nel-Ric 301, 1968)
- "Write Me a Letter" b/w "When Wise Men Cry" (Tewa 1001, March 1970)

== Bibliography ==
- Markesich, Mike (2012). Teenbeat Mayhem (1st ed.). Branford, Connecticut: Priceless Info Press. ISBN 978-0-985-64825-1.
