= Richard Lucero =

American politician (1935–2024)

Mayor of Española, New Mexico
- In office 1968–1974
- Preceded by: Epimenio Vigil
- Succeeded by: Santiago Martinez
- In office 1986–1994
- Preceded by: Consuelo S. Thompson
- Succeeded by: Ross Chavez
- In office 1998–2006
- Preceded by: Ross Chavez
- Succeeded by: Joseph Maestas

Personal details
- Born: March 16, 1935; Española, New Mexico, U.S.
- Died: January 22, 2024 (aged 88); Española, New Mexico, U.S.
- Political party: Democratic
- Profession: Businessman

Richard L. Lucero (March 16, 1935 – January 22, 2024) was an American businessman and politician in New Mexico, who was the longest-serving mayor of Española, serving on and off for a total of 22 years.

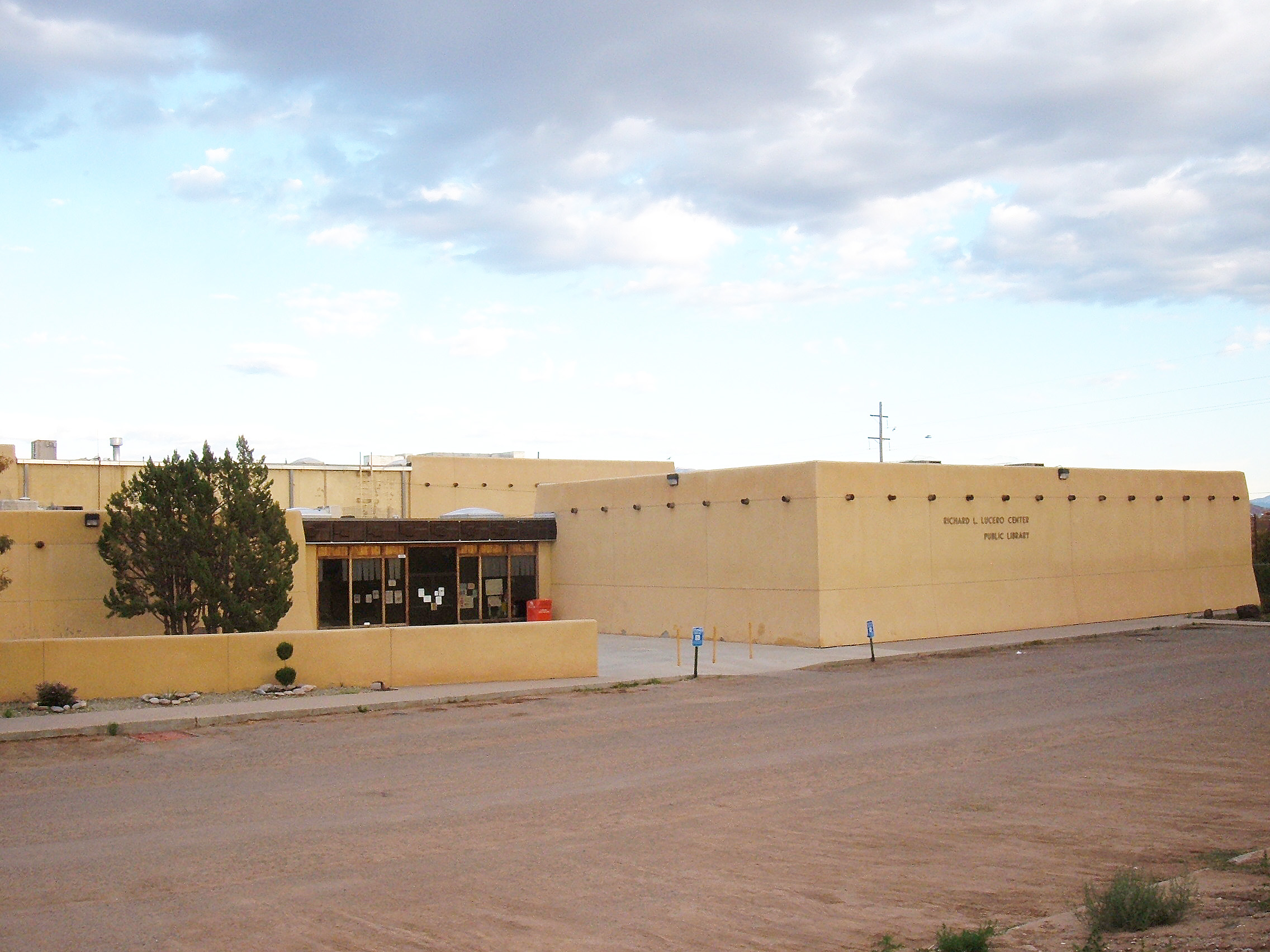
Richard L. Lucero Center in Española, New Mexico named in his honor – housing the Española Public Library, community gym, public swimming pool and public meeting rooms

Lucero is the owner of Country Farm Supply, a store on Española's Riverside Drive, that his family have owned since the 1970s. In 2004, he founded Española Military Academy, based on a similar school in Oakland, California, with the vision of improving academic achievement through the use military discipline. In 2008, the Academy underwent a funding crisis as State officials sought to withdraw funding based on students' performance and radical teaching methods.

The Richard L. Lucero Center, Española's Public Library and Recreational Swim and Athletic Center, was named in his honor during his administration.

In 2019, Richard L. Lucero was accused in two separate legal actions of having sexually abused boys in relation to his role as a Scoutmaster and Explorers troop leader in Española during the 1970s, 1980s, and 1990s.

Lucero died from a heart attack in Española, on January 22, 2024, at the age of 88.
