= Jacobo de la Serna =

Jacobo de la Serna (born 1965 in Espanola, New Mexico, USA) is a ceramic artist, Spanish Colonial scholar and painter. His work is exhibited in permanent collections around the United States.

In 2009 de la Serna was selected for a "one man" exhibit at the Grounds For Sculpture Museum in Hamilton, New Jersey. He has given talks about his work and ceramic traditions at museums and galleries including the Denver Art Museum.

De la Serna is a direct descendant of some of the earliest Spanish families to settle in New Mexico in 1598; he cites these deep cultural roots as both an influence and a guiding light for his artwork. He has been a consistent award winning artist at the annual Spanish Market in Santa Fe, NM numerous times since 1994. de la Serna is seen as a mentor by many young artists. de la Serna has been collected by museums such as the Santa Fe Museum of International Folk Art, The Denver Art Museum, Grounds For Sculpture and the Albuquerque Museum. His work is in both private and corporate collections throughout the United and abroad, and he is represented by numerous galleries.

Andrew Connors, Curator of the Albuquerque Museum has said of de la Serna's work:

vessels are astoundingly sensuous and exist as pure contemporary sculpture, however his knowledge of past production, technique, and aesthetics means that they are not simply disassociated objects within the art-for-art's-sake idiom. Supreme craftsmanship combined with refined and elegant aesthetics gives rise to great art. Adding knowledge of age-old technologies to that mix gives rise to deeply rooted, profound objects with cultural and contemporary relevance. The work Jacobo creates represents the future of the art form. de la Serna is keeping tradition alive by preventing it from stagnating.

== Career ==
de la Serna studied art independently at the Instituto de Bellas Artes, Granada, Spain, the Sanchez Conservation, Santa Fe, the Museum of International Folk Art, Santa Fe, the Osona Gallery and Studio, Santa Fe, and Santos of New Mexico, Santa Fe.

Much of de la Serna's time was spent studying the work of early New Mexican Colonial iconographers and the use of traditional tempera on panel techniques. This early work was quickly sought after by private collectors and museums. While not prolific in this genre, his work in retablos, bulto carvings and gesso relief earned him awards and respect. His work has been widely published in books and magazine articles. He is represented in the Smithsonian's Archives of American Art.

de la Serna has notably helped to revive "gesso relief" and "Casitas" as a style type in American pottery.

In his pottery, de la Serna fuses both very early and modern New Mexican practices. His use of micaceous clay with its subtle sparkle, harkens back not only to the ancient traditions of mica flecked clay used by early Neolithic Iberians, Celti-Iberians, and the Taos and Picuris Pueblos, but also to the Hispanic people in New Mexico and early Spanish settlers in Santa Elena, la Florida (1566-1587) who also produced micaceous pottery during the colonial period and in the early nineteenth century in New Mexico.

de la Serna hand-builds his pots using coil-and-scrap technology, and fires his pottery in the style of open pit kilns traditionally used by indigenous peoples. However, de la Serna's pottery, although indicative of ancient forms such as ollas and bean pots, are thoroughly modern. His minimalist, elegant lines are highly sculptural, and have moved beyond the concept of pottery in a practical sense. de la Serna's work is known for being executed with a high degree of technical prowess given the monumental sizes compared to those often rendered using the same techniques.

The late Native American artist R.C. Gorman, praised de la Serna's work: "Jacobo creates from his soul, work that is poignant and sensual. A truly gifted man".

After much success as a ceramic artist in 2010, de la Serna turned his attention to oil painting during the winter break from pottery. His paintings evoke religious icons and the classic turn of the century Northern New Mexican villages that he was so familiar with, such as in his painting Renata's House. His critics and collectors were immediately impressed with his ability and this new work has quickly found its way into many private and museum collections.

== Selected awards ==
- Spanish Market Santa Fe:

First Place Pottery 2004/2005/2006/2007/2008/2009/2010/2011
Distinguished Artist Award and Judges Choice Award 2000, Second Place Mixed Media 1999,

- Taylor Museum, Best of Show, 1999

== Exhibits/Permanent Collections ==
- Denver Art Museum - Colorado: "Marvelous Mud", June 11, 2011 - Permanent Collection
- Grounds For Sculpture - Hamilton, NJ: October 2009 - April 2010: "Reflections on Tradition" One Man Exhibit
- Toad Hall Gallery - Hamilton, NJ: October 2009 - January 2010
- Albuquerque Museum - Albuquerque, NM: Winter/Spring 2010: "Common Ground" and "Albuquerque NOW"
- Coopers Art Brokerage House - Carefree, Az On-going
- National Hispanic Cultural Center Museum - Albuquerque, NM: 2001, 2004 (permanent)
- Cooper–Hewitt National Design Museum (Smithsonian), Latino Design Archives - NY, 2000 (permanent)
- Museum of International Folk Art – Santa Fe, NM: 1995, 1999 (permanent)
- (MoSCA) Museum of Spanish Colonial Arts – Santa Fe, NM: 1995, 1997, 2001, 2003, 2004 (permanent)
- Autry Museum of Western Heritage – Los Angeles, CA: 1998 (permanent)
- Albuquerque Museum – Albuquerque, NM:1999, 2011 (permanent)
- Denver Art Museum – Denver, CO:1995, 1998, 2011 (permanent)
- Musee de Religion – Quebec, Canada: 1997 (group exhibit)
- Barnes and Noble, Corporate – NY, NY 1999 (permanent)
- Western Assets Financial Services Asian HQ – Singapore 2000 (permanent)
- Michael McCormick Gallery – Taos, NM July, 2000 "One Man Show"
- Robert Nichols Gallery – Santa Fe, NM August, 2003 "The NEW Work"

== Media commendations ==
=== Books ===
- Laichas, Fowler, and Stem. Millennium Collection: a twenty-first century celebration of fine art in New Mexico, NMMC, 2000 ISBN 9780967903408.
- Carmella Padilla and Donna Pierce. Conexiones, MOSCA.
- Michael Wallis and Jack Parsons. Heavens Window, Graphic Arts Center Publishing Co.
- Chuck and Jan Rosenak. The Saint Makers, Northland Publishing.
- Thomas J. Steele, S.J., Barbe Awalt, Paul Rhetts. The Regis Santos, LPD Press.
- Paul Rhetts and Barbe Awalte.Our Saints Among Us. LPD Press.

=== Magazines ===
- The Johns Hopkins Magazine, November 1998
- The S.F. New Mexican Magazine, 60th Anniversary Edition, Spanish Market July, 2011
- Chronicles of the Trail, Vol 6, No 1, Winter 2010, page 20
- Sculpture Magazine, October 2009
- Pennington Post, Princeton New Jersey, 2009
- Pasatiempo Magazine, SFNM, August 2003
- The Fig Tree, Gonzaga University, Spokane WA, October 2003
- The Santa Fean Magazine, July 2001
- Pasatiempo Magazine, SFNM, December 2001
- New Mexico Traveler, 2001
- The Taos Magazine, Cover Artist July 2000
- Focus/Santa Fe Magazine, Winter 2000

=== Exhibition catalogues ===
- Grounds For Sculpture, Fall/Winter 2009-2010 Exhibitions Catalogue
- Denver Art Museum, Alianza Novedades Magazine, Fall 2011

=== Videos ===
- Hauntings Across America, Video with Michael Dorn, The Entertainment Group

== Academic publications ==
- 2005 - Sensationalism and The Misunderstood: The Pius Fraternity of Our Father Jesus The Nazarene, The Subject Material of the Taos Artists, Exhibit Catalogue, Taos Art form the Collections of the Starke, Eiteljorg and Museum of Northwest Art and Culture.
- 2004 – Indigenous Mexican Imagery: A Catechist In Corn Stalk, The Cristo de Cana de Maiz. The history and restoration of a corn pith Christ figure. For the Los Latinos exhibit of collections from the Museum of Northwest Art and Culture.
- 1999 - The Relationship Between Educational Institutes and The Arts Economy in Northern New Mexico, NNMCC Press
- 1999 - Culture y Cultura, Autry Museum of Western Heritage, Los Angeles, CA.
- 1999 - From Earth and Sky Indian Art of the Americas, from the collection of the Cheney Cowles Museum, Spokane WA.

de la Serna was honored in 2001 for his many contributions as a "Life Time" Member by the Living History Museum of El Rancho de la Golondrinas. He is currently serving a Mayoral Appointment to the Board of Trustees for the Albuquerque Museum where he is active on both the Executive Committee and the Arts Advisory Board. He has served on committees for the National Hispanic Cultural Center.
