= Frank Bond =

American businessman (1863–1945)

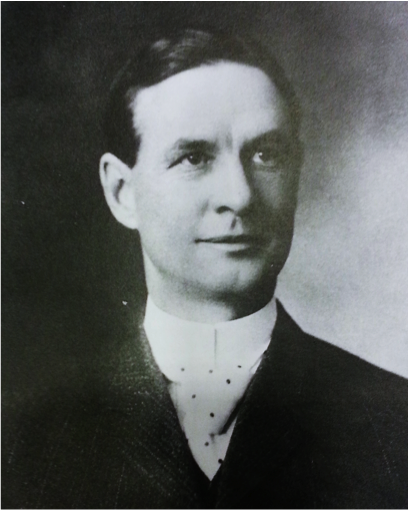
- Bond in 1903, age 40
- Born: February 13, 1863; Quebec, Canada East
- Died: October 21, 1945 (aged 82); Los Angeles, California, United States
- Occupations: Businessman, entrepreneur
- Political party: Republican Party

Frank Bond (February 13, 1863 – October 21, 1945) was a Canadian-born American businessman and entrepreneur, known for his economic investments and business enterprises in New Mexico.

== Early years ==
As a young man Bond left Canada in hopes of finding work in the United States. His brother George had left Canada a few years before, Frank followed his brother to Pueblo, Colorado in 1881. It is there where he met Anna Caffal, his future wife. His brother owned a large wool processing plant in Pueblo, Frank, however, painted buildings in the area so he could earn money. In 1883, the Bond brothers sold their wool business and moved to Northern New Mexico where they settled in a small and newly established railroad town called Española.

Upon arriving in Española, the brothers quickly found their new home as they broke into the wool business once again. With their success in the business, Frank and George decided to acquire extensive tracts of land, including the portions of the Valles Caldera (Baca Location) in the Jemez Mountains.

Using this land to raise thousands of sheep, he quickly took advantage of the lucrative wool market. His businesses expanded to include wool storage and marketing ventures. The two brothers profits were so large, they bought-out the Scott & Whitehead mercantile in Española, and renamed it G.W. Bond & Brother Co., it was the largest in the region and carried the absolute most updated goods, Frank was just 21 years old at the time. The store brought economic growth and prominence to Española, which at the time only had 150 inhabitants, later growing to 3,500, due to the Bond Interests.

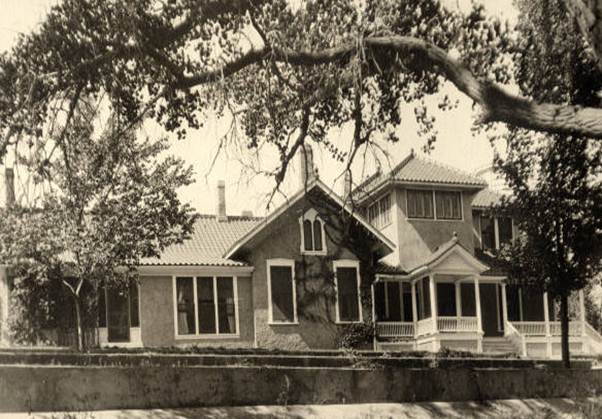
The Bond house in 1920

On August 15, 1887 he officially married Anna. Frank immediately began work on a two-bedroom territorial Spanish adobe home that was built atop a hill in the downtown Española area. Soon after the couple decided to have three children: Maude, Amay, and Frank Jr. To make room for their children, Frank expanded the house in 1910, making it five times the original size and gave it a new image, styling the home after the Neoclassical architecture. At the time Frank Bond's house was considered one of the largest in Northern New Mexico. The house is considered a mansion, it contains over 12 decorous rooms, three elegant fireplaces, and featured a sunroom. Frank built a small park nearby for his children.

== Older years ==
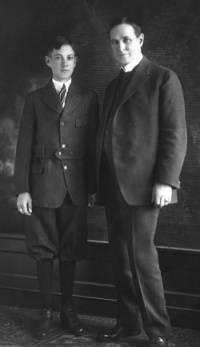
Frank and his son, Frank Jr. (1914)

By 1917 Bond was considered a millionaire, a now prominent man in New Mexico business, he had owned 12 businesses in New Mexico. Española was the headquarters for all the Bond Interests. In 1924 he was spoken of as a possible gubernatorial candidate then and again in 1928, instead Bond insisted that his good friend, Richard C. Dillon who was also Republican, run for governor, Dillon ended up winning. Bond preferred the more reserved work of building the state's economic enterprises than serving in large scale politics. Although Bond did not run for governor, he remained politically active in Española with the Republican Party, he pushed for the incorporation of Española into a municipality, after doing so, he helped elect the first mayor, F.R. Frankenburger. Bond served as "Popular" mayor of Española from 1907 to 1913 and again from 1918 to 1922, he also served as a trustee on the local school board in Española.

In 1925, Bond and his family relocated to Albuquerque, due to his daughter's battle with tuberculosis. She later died. Bond decided to stay in Albuquerque, purchasing once again, a large home. He moved most wool businesses to Albuquerque and established even more business ventures. He built the Wool Warehouse Company with his son, Frank Bond Jr., and other partners.

=== Companies owned ===
Bond owned mercantile's and companies all across the State of New Mexico:

- G.W. Bond & Brother Company – Española
- G.W. Bond & Brother Mercantile – Encino
- Bond, McCarthy Co. – Taos
- A. McArthur Company – Wagon Mound
- Bond & Nohl Co. – Española
- Bond & Weist – Cuervo
- Espanola Milling and Elevator Company – Española
- Bond–Sargant, Co. – Grants
- Bond–Baker Co. – Roswell
- Espanola Mercantile (formerly C. L. Pollard & Company) – Española
- Bond–Connell Sheep & Wool Co. – Albuquerque
- Frank Bond & Son, Co. – Albuquerque

=== Death ===
Frank Bond died in Los Angeles, California on June 21, 1945, due to chronic heart alignment. His son, Frank Jr. took over as president of Frank Bond & Son and other companies and held the vast family interests until his sudden death from illness in 1953. At that time, with no family member able to manage operations, business partners began selling off assets and the empire that Bond had built was all liquidated.

It is said that the ghost of Frank Bond haunts his old wool warehouse in Downtown Albuquerque. Encompassing some 5,000 square feet, the Wool Warehouse Theater Restaurant is housed on the second floor. During performances a man in a cream-colored suit has been known to have appeared on the stage. Thought to be Mr. Bond himself, the spirit is known to happily watch productions from the side stage.

== Legacy ==
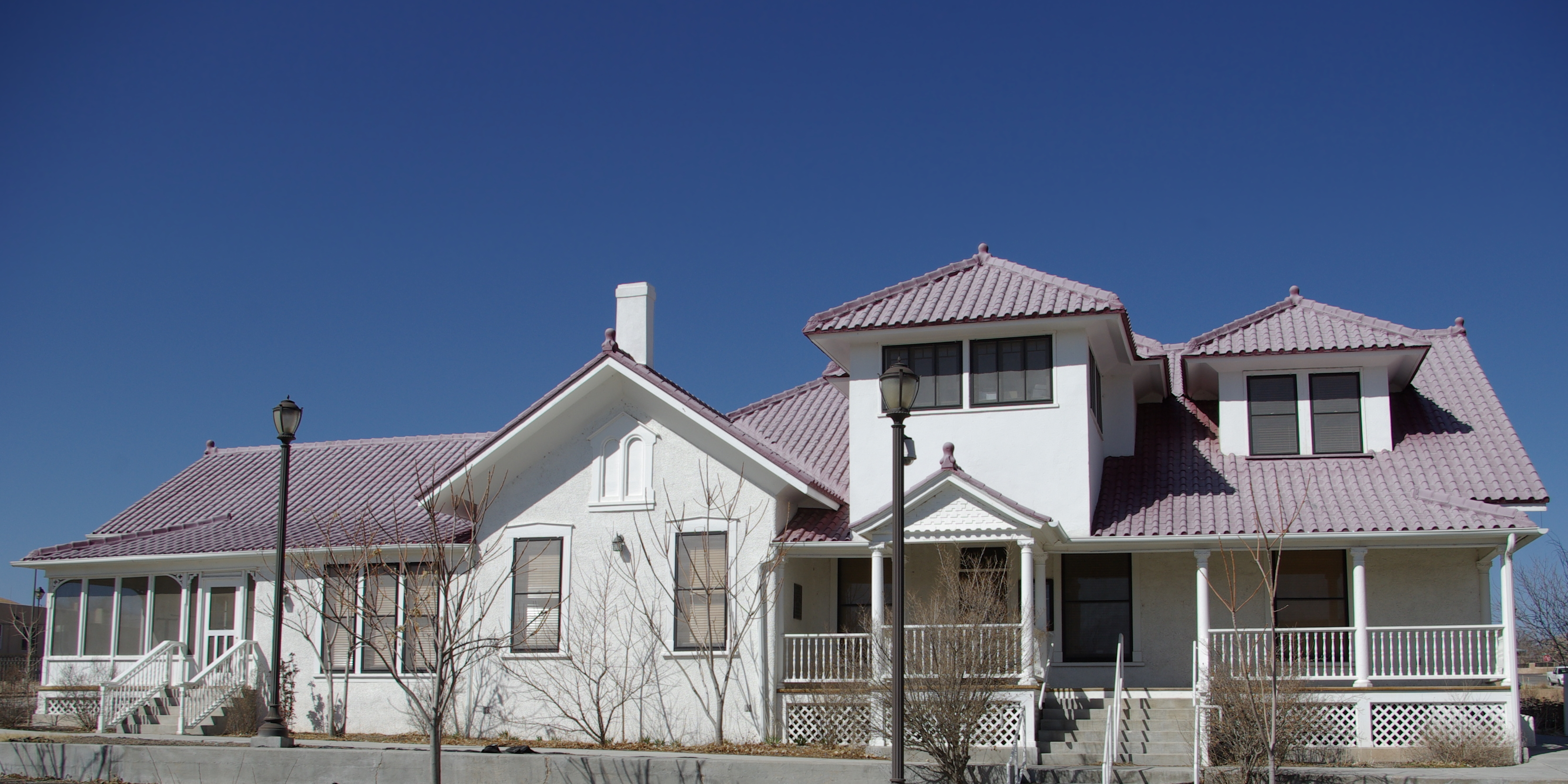
Present day Bond house

Frank Bond left a legacy as the most influential man in the Española Valley. Bond's home in Española still stands, near the home a road was named in his family's honor. In 1957 a Bond heir had deeded the home to the city. Thereafter the city began using the home as its city hall and government building till 1977. In the 1980s the house was placed on the National register of historic places. In 2000, the home was completely remodeled and restored to its 19th-century grandeur. Today the house is a city history museum.

Bond is buried at the Fairview Memorial cemetery in Albuquerque along with other family members.

=== Family legacy ===
Today the Bond family still resides in New Mexico, Frank's grandson Frank M. Bond (III) is a prominent lawyer, also a Republican, he unsuccessfully ran for governor of New Mexico in 1990. He and his son Frank IV, both reside in Santa Fe.
