= Robert B. Hall (Japanologist) =

American geographer (1896–1975)

Robert Burnett Hall (July 18, 1896 – April 4, 1975), born in Española, New Mexico, was an American geographer known for his work on Japan. He taught for most of his career at University of Michigan, Ann Arbor.

== Honors and positions ==
The Japanese government conferred on him the Order of the Rising Sun, and the Order of the Sacred Treasure, the highest decoration granted to a foreigner by Japan. He was one of seven foreign geographers, and the only American, honored by the Silver Medal of the Tokyo Geographical Society. He served in Japan as the representative of the Asia Foundation 1955–1960, and founding director of University of Michigan Center for Japanese Studies, 1947–1957. He received the "Meritorious Contribution" award from the Association of American Geographers in 1956.

== Education and academic career ==
Hall joined the United States Army in 1913 and rose to the rank of captain as an intelligence officer in France during World War I. After the war, he became a student at the University of Michigan in 1920, where he obtained his bachelor's, master's, and in 1927, doctoral degree in the Department of Geography. His doctoral thesis was based on field work in Haiti. He became instructor in 1923, the year the department attained independent status, and was promoted to professor in 1938.

In 1928 Hall did his first field work in Japan. When the Second World War began, Hall was studying the Japanese immigrants who had gone to Latin America. He was commissioned a lieutenant-colonel in the United States Army, directing operations of the Office of Strategic Services, first on the Pacific Coast, later in the China-India theater, where he was promoted to the rank of colonel.

Following the war he returned to University of Michigan. He was president of the Association for Asian Studies in 1951 and served for many years on the board of the Social Science Research Council, including several years as chairman. The fifteen students he directed in their doctoral work chose Japan as the subject of their theses.

== Building Area studies ==
Hall worked to develop the interdisciplinary study of Asia through the Area studies approach, both at University of Michigan and through the Association for Asian Studies and the Social Science Research Council. When he was appointed Director of the Center for Japanese Studies in 1947, he made clear that his policy was that the Center would train students in an additional strength, not one which would be an alternative to training in a discipline and that Area Studies would not drain students away from the established departments. The Center's executive committee included members from the departments of Anthropology, Fine Arts, Economics, and the Oriental Studies Program.

Hall's study, Area Studies: With Special Reference to Their Implications for Research in the Social Sciences, published in 1947 for the SSRC, drew up the arguments in favor of the approach in order to organize government and foundation support.

The Center established a research program in Okayama, Japan, in 1950. The program was partly made possible when Hall met directly with Douglas MacArthur, head of the American Occupation of Japan. He later received a telegram from the General saying that the project "appears to be boldly planned and soundly conceived" and should "result in a body of knowledge which will prove of inestimable value..." Hall stayed in Japan as representative of the Asia Foundation until 1960.

== Representative works ==
- —— (1934). The Japanese Empire. Worcester, Mass.?.; New York: Wiley, 1935.
- Willcox, William Bradford and Robert B. Hall (1947). The United States in the Postwar World; Addresses Given at the 1945 Summer Conference of the University of Michigan. Ann Arbor: Univ. of Michigan Press.
- —— (1947). Area Studies: With Special Reference to Their Implications for Research in the Social Sciences. New York: Social Science Research Council.
- Hall, Robert B.; No, Toshio (1956). Japanese Geography: A Guide to Japanese Reference and Research Materials. Ann Arbor: University of Michigan Press.
- —— (1960). "Revolution in Asian Agriculture". Journal of Geography (Chigaku Zasshi). 69 (3): 97–105. doi:10.5026/jgeography.69.97.
- —— (1963). Japan, Industrial Power of Asia. D. Van Nostrand.

== References and further reading ==
- Center for Japanese Studies (2013), History of CJS, Center for Japanese Studies University of Michigan, archived from the original on 2016-03-04
- Gosling, L. A. Peter; Kish, George (2011), Professor Emeritus Robert B. Hall, University of Michigan Faculty History Project
- Pritchard, Earl H (1963). "The Foundations of the Association for Asian Studies, 1928–48". The Journal of Asian Studies. 22 (4): 513–523. doi:10.1017/s0021911800108447.
- Ward, Robert E. (2001), "Reflections on the Origins of the Center for Japanese Studies: A Tribute to Robert Burnett Hall (1896–1975)", Japan in the world, The World in Japan: Fifty Years of Japanese studies at Michigan, Ann Arbor, MI: Center for Japanese Studies, The University of Michigan
