= Shel Hershorn =

American photojournalist (1929–2011)

- Born: Herbert Sheldon Hershorn; June 11, 1929; Denver, Colorado, US
- Died: September 17, 2011 (aged 82); Española, New Mexico, US
- Occupation: Photojournalist
- Years active: 1940s–1970s

Herbert Sheldon Hershorn (June 11, 1929 – September 17, 2011) was an American photojournalist who was active in Texas and the Deep South during the civil rights movement. He is best known for his 1966 photograph of the Main Building in the aftermath of the University of Texas tower shooting. In the 1970s, he retired from photojournalism and went on to pursue the hippie lifestyle in New Mexico, where he became a successful furniture maker.

== Early life and photojournalism ==
Hershorn was born on June 11, 1929, in Denver, to a jeweler father. His father, who Hershorn described as "patriotic", enlisted him into the United States Navy; while serving, he practiced aerial photography while deployed in Hawaii. He and a friend deserted from the Navy for seven years – the period to be considered legally dead – and skied in Colorado during that time. After sustaining a back injury, his absence was discovered and he was arrested until his return to service was ordered by the Navy. After he completed his service in 1950, he studied at the Progressive School of Photography in New Haven, Connecticut, using the G.I. Bill.

In 1951, Hershorn worked as an Army hospital photographer in Denver. He began working as a photojournalist for the Casper Tribune-Herald. In 1954, he moved to Dallas, where he worked for the Dallas Times Herald and United Press International (UPI). With UPI, he was assigned to photograph Pat Milliken, a banking executive who had lost $250,000 to embezzlement, who pulled a pistol on him as he rejected being photographed; he destroyed one photograph at Millikens request, though left with one of him sobbing. He later joined the Black Star agency, which syndicated his photographs for National Geographic, Newsweek, Fortune, Life, Look, Playboy, The Saturday Evening Post, Sports Illustrated, and Time, among other publications. He also photographed several U.S. presidents.

While working in the Deep South, Hershorn photographed several historical events in the civil rights movement. He photographed the Freedom Riders, and in 1963, he documented the Stand in the Schoolhouse Door, where Alabama Governor George Wallace blocked the doorway at the University of Alabama to prevent African American students from attending. Hershorn also captured the moment when Lee Harvey Oswald was placed into an ambulance following his murder. On August 1, 1966, he took a series of photographs of the aftermath of the University of Texas tower shooting. One of the most notable images from the series, known as Texas Store Window Shattered by Sniper, appeared on the cover of Life; Hershorn later kept the cover hung in his home in New Mexico. The picture depicts the view of the Main Building at the university through a bullet hole in the window of a nearby jewelry store.

Hershorn's photographic works, consisting of about 100,000 images, are held by the Dolph Briscoe Center for American History.

== Furniture making career and later life ==
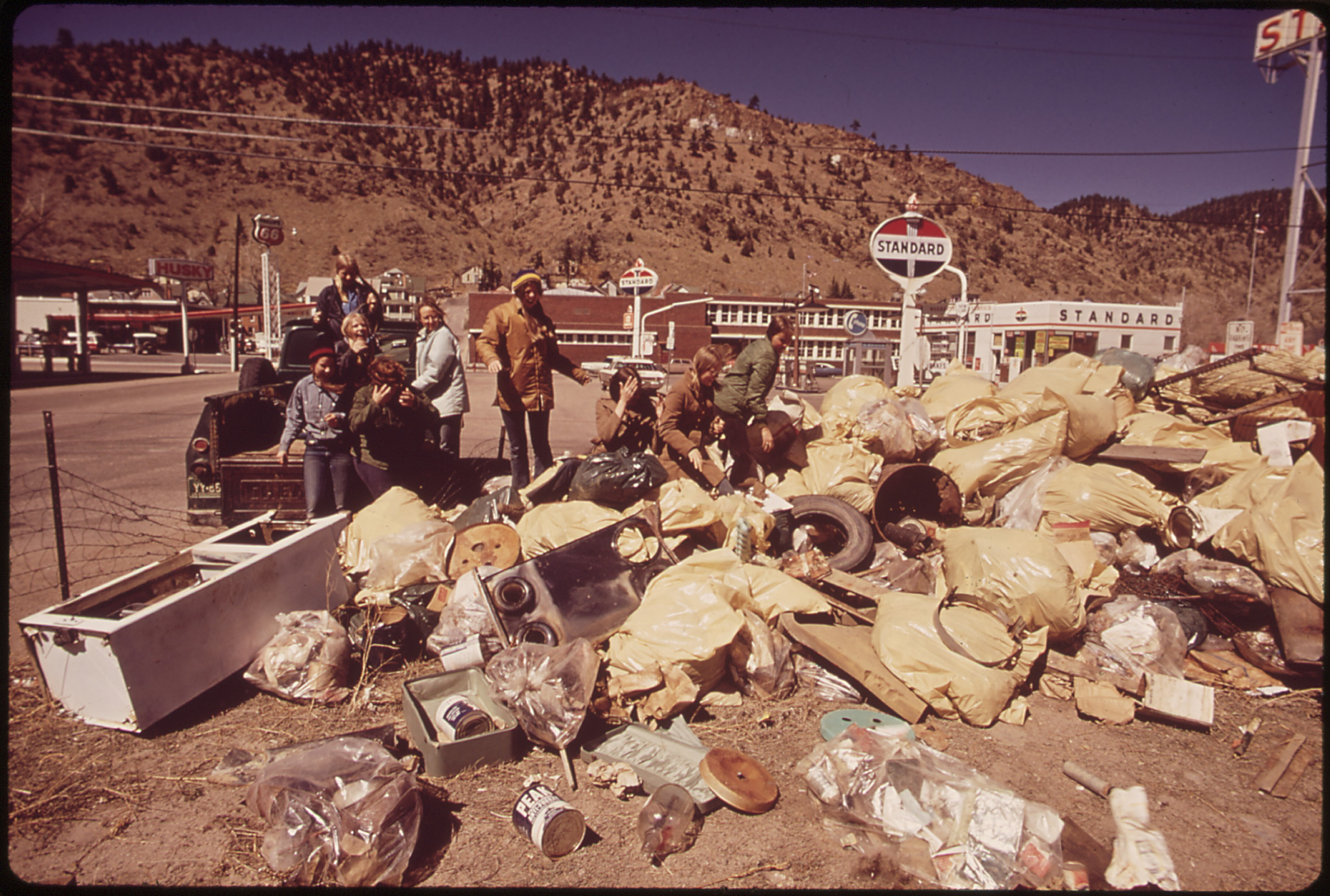
Hobo Camp At 24th Street and South Platte (1972); photographed by Hershorn

Hershorn lost interest in journalism following the assassination of John F. Kennedy and chose to pursue a hippie lifestyle, which he called his "second life". In early 1971, he purchased a red multi-stop truck, a trailer, and a pony he named Sweet Bess. Hershorn visited shopping centers and photographed children as they rode the pony. After his van broke down in the Taos Valley and the pony ran away a week later, Hershorn chose to remain in Taos. There, he lived with journalist Robert Draper and worked as an assistant plumber and furniture maker. He made furniture of umber lumber received from disassembled buildings, which was often unusually shaped. He founded the Semi Polite Furniture Company.

In Texas, Hershorn lived in University Park, where he and his wife Connie, a writer with the Dallas Morning News, raised two sons. They married by 1951 and divorced by 1968. After moving to Taos, New Mexico in 1971, he married Sonja, an elementary schoolteacher. He later lived in Gallina and Talpa, New Mexico. Their house was composed of three bedrooms and was described as "primitive" by the Albuquerque Journal. He drove a 1954 Chevrolet pickup truck, which he traded a large drum of water for; he mounted a sheep skull to it as a hood ornament.

Hershorn was an outdoorsman who enjoyed fishing and reading. He lived in restored log cabins and raised goats, for which he built a playground. He died of pneumonia on September 17, 2011, aged 82, in an Española nursing home. He also had alcohol-related dementia and a broken hip from a fall, the latter which made him unable to walk. A wake was held in October, and his body was donated to the University of New Mexico School of Medicine.

== Selected work ==
- Sam Rayburn (Sam Rayburn funeral series) (1961)
- Constance Baker Motley with Protesters, Washington, D.C. (Civil rights movement series) (ca. 1962-1963)
- Governor George Wallace (Stand in the Schoolhouse Door series) (1963)
- Lee Harvey Oswald (Assassination of John F. Kennedy series) (1963)
- Astrodome (Faces of Texas series) (ca. 1962-1965)
- Georgia O'Keeffe (ca. 1960–1966)
- Texas Store Window Shattered by Sniper (UT Tower shooting series) (1966)
- Hobo Camp at 24th Street and South Platte (1972)

== Exhibitions ==
- "Faces of Texas". Texas Bank and Trust. ca. 1966.
- "Vision and Expression". (Amon Carter Museum of American Art, Fort Worth, November 15 – December 31, 1969)
- "A Personal Country". (Amon Carter Museum of American Art, Fort Worth, November 25 – December 31, 1969).

== Collections ==
- Amon Carter Museum of American Art
- Briscoe Center for American History
- Georgia O'Keeffe Museum
- Library of Congress
- National Archives at College Park
- Time Inc. Picture Collection
- Wittliff Collections
