= Pueblo =

Native settlements and societies of Southwestern United States

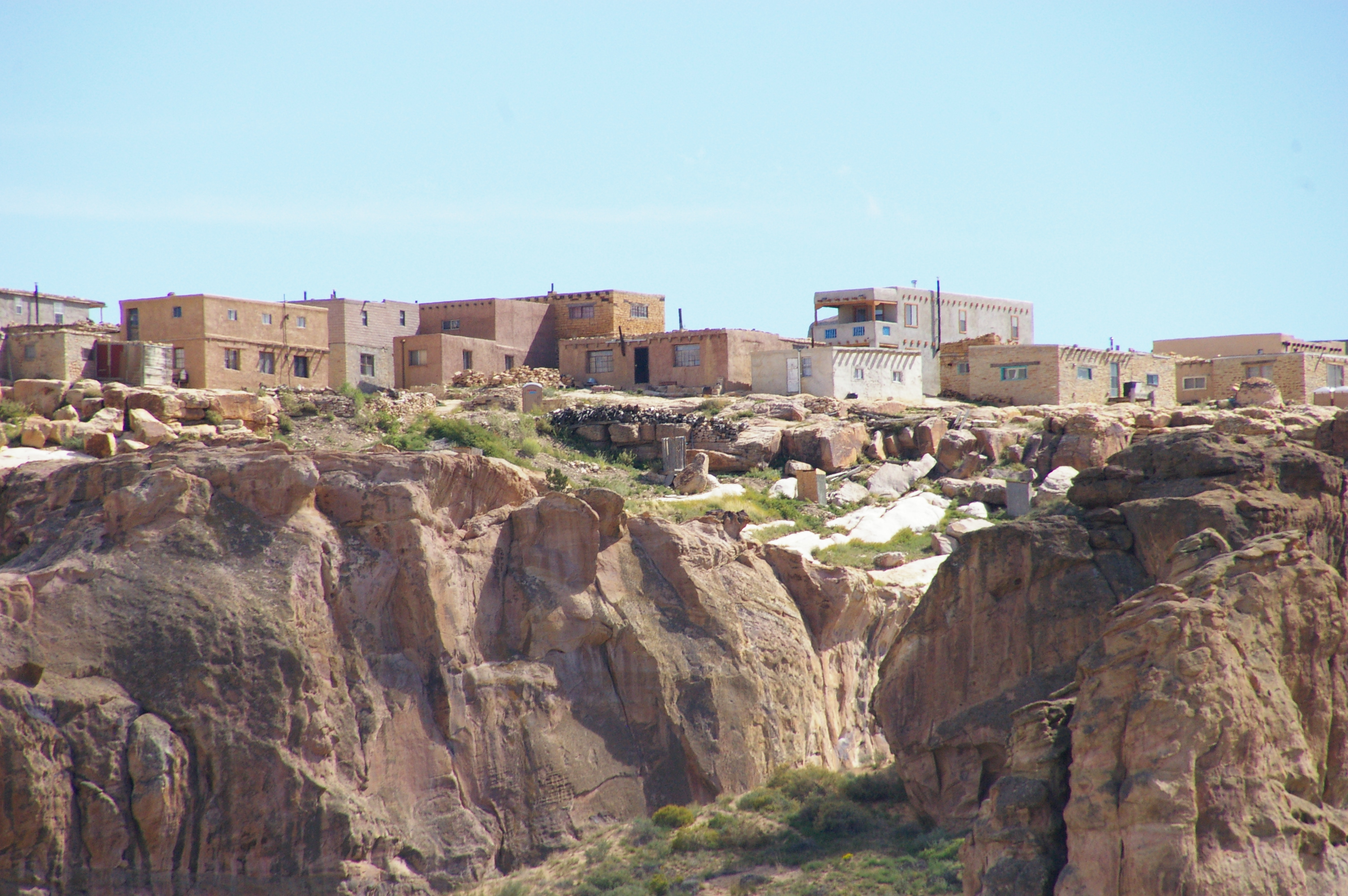
Acoma Pueblo in northern New Mexico, one of the oldest pueblo towns

Pueblo refers to the settlements of the Pueblo peoples, Native American governments in the Southwestern United States, currently in New Mexico, Arizona, and Texas. The permanent communities, including some of the oldest continually occupied settlements in the United States, are called pueblos (lowercased).

Spanish explorers of northern New Spain used the term pueblo to refer to permanent Indigenous towns they found in the region, mainly in New Mexico and parts of Arizona, in the former province of Nuevo México. This term continued to be used to describe the communities housed in apartment structures built of stone, adobe, and other local material. The structures were usually multistoried buildings surrounding an open plaza. Many rooms were accessible only through ladders raised and lowered by the inhabitants, thus protecting them from break-ins and unwanted guests. Larger pueblos are occupied by hundreds to thousands of Puebloan people.

Several federally recognized tribes have historically resided in pueblos of such design. Later Pueblo Deco and modern Pueblo Revival architecture, which mixes elements of traditional Pueblo and Hispano design, has continued to be a popular architectural style in New Mexico, expanding to surrounding states over time.

The term is part of the official name of some historical sites, such as Pueblo of Acoma.

== Etymology and usage ==
On the central Spanish Meseta the unit of settlement was and is the pueblo; which is to say, the large nucleated village surrounded by its own fields, with no outlying farms, separated from its neighbors by some considerable distance, sometimes as much as ten miles [16 km] or so. The demands of agrarian routine and the need for defense, the simple desire for human society in the vast solitude of (rocky plains, or the desert), dictated that it should be so. Nowadays the pueblo might have a population running into thousands. Doubtless, they were much smaller in the early middle ages, but we should probably not be far wrong if we think of them as having had populations of some hundreds.

The word pueblo is the Spanish word both for "town" or "village" and for "people". It comes from the Latin root word populus meaning "people". Spanish colonials applied the term to their own civic settlements, but to only those Native American settlements having fixed locations and permanent buildings.Less-permanent Native settlements (such as those found in California) were often referred to as rancherías.

In the Rio Grande Valley of New Mexico, specifically in the region between Albuquerque, Santa Fe and Taos, the word "pueblo" defines a "distinct cultural group in the Southwestern United States" and their villages. The Holmes Museum of Anthropology defines this specific group as a "common culture with individual variances [that] connects them.

== Pueblo tribes ==
Of the federally recognized Native American communities in the Southwest, those designated by the King of Spain as pueblo at the time Spain ceded territory to the United States, after the American Revolutionary War, are legally recognized as Pueblo by the Bureau of Indian Affairs. Some of the pueblos also came under the jurisdiction of the United States, in its view, by its treaty with Mexico, which had briefly gained rule over territory in the Southwest ceded by Spain after Mexican independence. There are 21 federally recognized Pueblos that are home to Pueblo peoples. Their official federal names are as follows:

- Hopi Tribe of Arizona (Uto-Aztecan)
- Ohkay Owingeh, New Mexico (Kiowa-Tanoan)
- Pueblo of Acoma, New Mexico (Keresan)
- Pueblo of Cochiti, New Mexico (Keresan)
- Pueblo of Isleta, New Mexico (Kiowa-Tanoan)
- Pueblo of Jemez, New Mexico (Kiowa-Tanoan)
- Pueblo of Laguna, New Mexico (Keresan)
- Pueblo of Nambe, New Mexico (Kiowa-Tanoan)
- Pueblo of Picuris, New Mexico (Kiowa-Tanoan)
- Pueblo of Pojoaque, New Mexico (Kiowa-Tanoan)
- Pueblo of San Felipe, New Mexico (Keresan)
- Pueblo of San Ildefonso, New Mexico (Kiowa-Tanoan)
- Pueblo of Sandia, New Mexico (Kiowa-Tanoan)
- Pueblo of Santa Ana, New Mexico (Keresan)
- Pueblo of Santa Clara, New Mexico (Kiowa-Tanoan)
- Pueblo of Taos, New Mexico (Kiowa-Tanoan)
- Pueblo of Tesuque, New Mexico (Kiowa-Tanoan)
- Pueblo of Zia, New Mexico (Keresan)
- Santo Domingo Pueblo (also Kewa Pueblo), New Mexico (Keresan)
- Ysleta Del Sur Pueblo, Texas (Kiowa-Tanoan)
- Zuni Tribe of the Zuni Reservation, New Mexico (Zuni)

One unrecognized tribe, the Piro/Manso/Tiwa Indian Tribe of the Pueblo of San Juan Guadalupe is currently petitioning the US Department of the Interior for federal recognition.

== Civic institutions ==
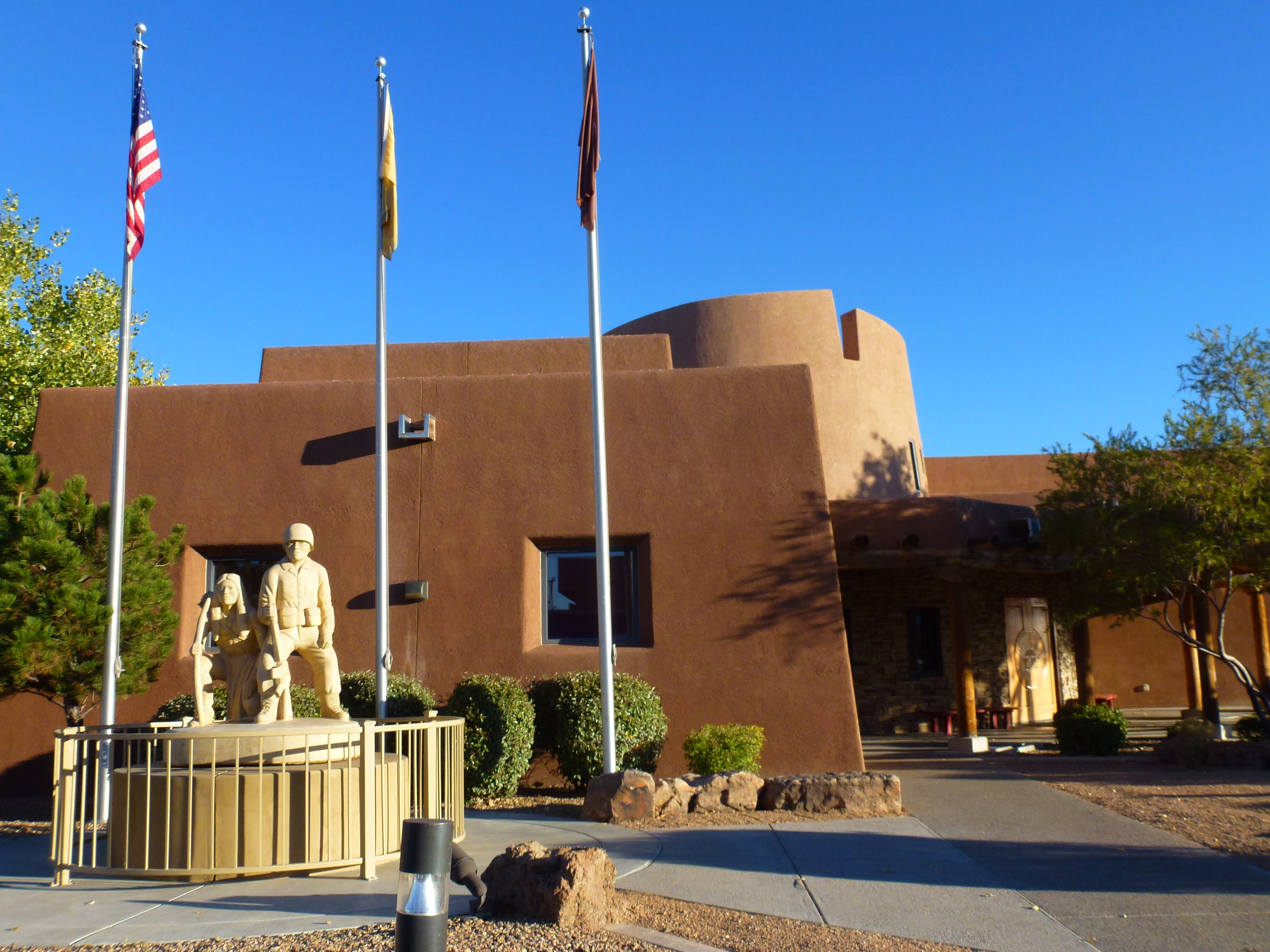
Indian Pueblo Cultural Center, Albuquerque, New Mexico

Each Pueblo is autonomous with its own governmental structure. Several organizations serve to unite the interests of difference Pueblos including the Albuquerque-based All Pueblo Council of Governors who collectively negotiates for land and water rights and advocates for Pueblo interests with the state and federal government. The interests of Eight Northern Pueblos are served by the Eight Northern Indian Pueblos Council based in Ohkay Owingeh (formerly San Juan Pueblo). Cochiti, Jemez, Sandia, Santa Ana, and Zia are served by the Five Sandoval Indian Pueblos, a nonprofit organization based in Rio Rancho.

The Indian Pueblo Cultural Center, founded in 1976 in Albuquerque, educates the public about all Pueblos through art, dance, and educational experiences. The center has a museum that presents Pueblo history and artifacts, and an interactive Pueblo House museum. An archive holds a collection of photographs, books, and tape recordings of oral histories. It also has a café and a restaurant, Indian Pueblo Kitchen, serving Indigenous cuisine.

Pueblo
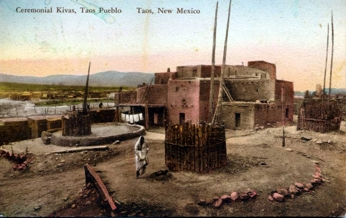
- Category: Federal Unit District IV
- Created: 1000 CE or earlier
- Number: 19 in New Mexico unknown amount in Arizona, Colorado, Utah or Mexico. 21 of them are federally recognized: 19 in New Mexico, 1 in Arizona, and 1 in Texas
- Government: Bureau of Indian Affairs

== Historical places ==
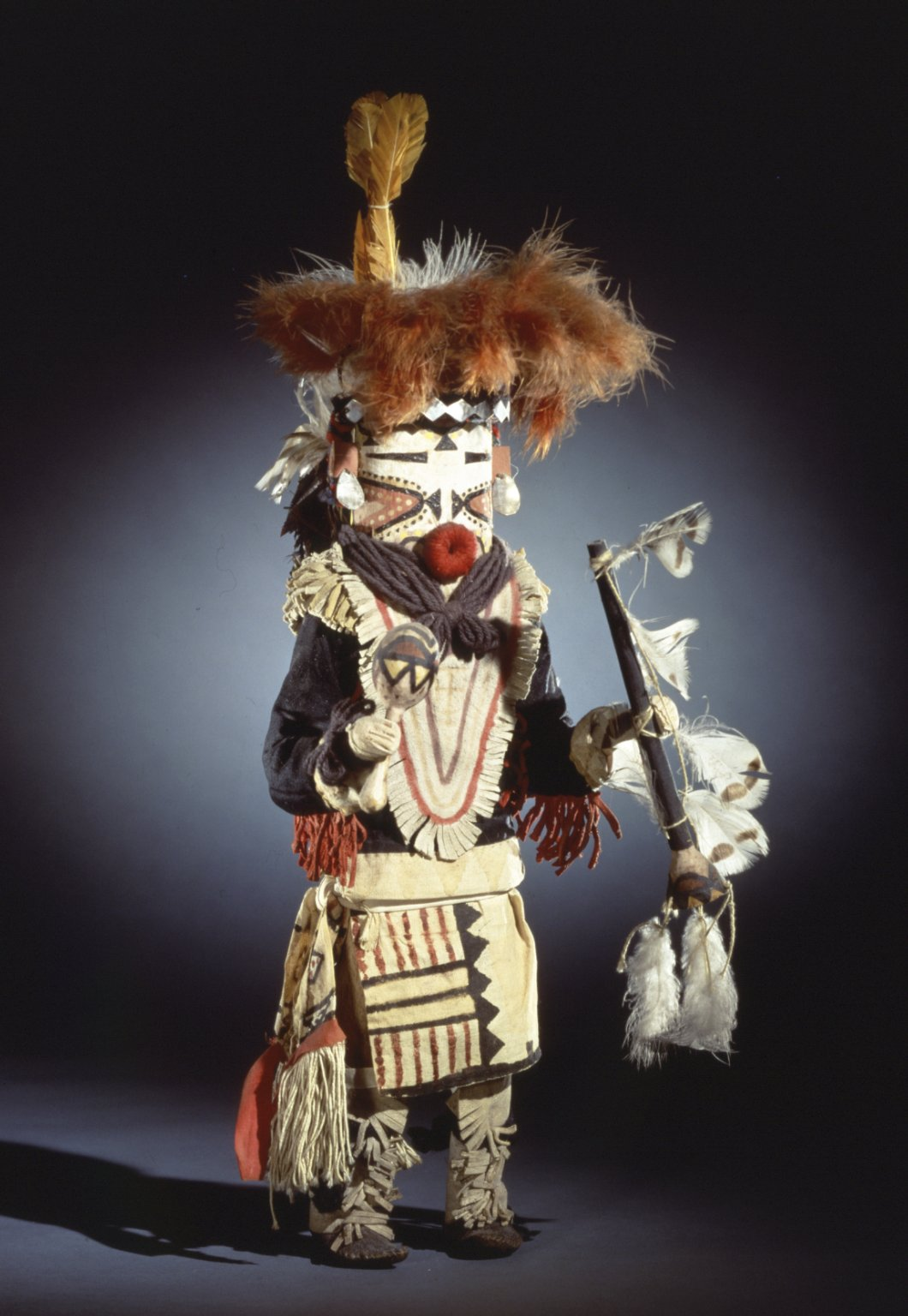
She-we-na (Zuni Pueblo), katsina tihu (Paiyatemu), late 19th century. Brooklyn Museum

Pre-Columbian towns and villages in the Southwest, such as Acoma, were located in defensible positions, for example, on high steep mesas. Anthropologists and official documents often refer to ancient residents of the area as pueblo cultures. For example, the National Park Service states, "The Late Puebloan cultures built the large, integrated villages found by the Spaniards when they began to move into the area." The people of some pueblos, such as Taos Pueblo, still inhabit centuries-old adobe pueblo buildings.

Contemporary residents often maintain other homes outside the historic pueblos. Adobe and light construction methods resembling adobe now dominate architecture at the many pueblos of the area, in nearby towns or cities, and in much of the American Southwest.

In addition to contemporary pueblos, numerous ruins of archeological interest are located throughout the Southwest. Some are of relatively recent origin. Others are of prehistoric origin, such as the cliff dwellings and other habitations of the Ancestral Puebloans, who emerged as a people around the 12th century BCE and began to construct their pueblos about 750–900 CE.

== Feast days ==
Many pueblos participate in syncretism between Indigenous Pueblo religion and Roman Catholicism. The pueblos welcome outsiders to participate in feast days, in which the Pueblo communities hold seasonal ceremonial dances, and certain households volunteer to feed visitors meals. Photography is forbidden. Visitors are advised to confirm events in advance with the Pueblos.

Dances include the antelope, bow-and-arrow, Comanche, corn, basket, buffalo, deer, harvest, Matachines, and turtle dances.

January

- 1: Transer of Canes: dances at most pueblos
- 6: King's Day Celebration: Nambé, Picuris, Sandia, Santa Ana, Santo Domingo, Taos
- 22–23: feast: San Ildefonso
- 25: Picuris, San Ildefonso

February

- 1st or 2nd weekend: Governor's Feast: Old Acoma, Ohkay Owingeh
- 2nd weekend: Caldelaria Day: Picuris, San Felipe

March

- 19: St. Joseph feast: Laguna

April

- Easter weekend: most pueblos
- Easter Sunday: Jemez, Nambé, Santo Domingo, San Ildefonso, Zia

May

- May 1: St. Philip Feast: San Felipe
- May 3: Feast of the Cross: Taos
- First Sunday: Santa Maria Feast: Acoma

June

- First Sunday of the month: Blessing of the fields: Tesuque
- 13: San Antonio feast: Ohkay Owingeh, Picuris, Sandia, Santa Clara, Taos
- 13: Ysleta del Sur
- 24: St John the Baptist feast: Ohkay Owingeh, Taos
- 29: San Pedro/St. Paul feast: Santa Ana, Santo Domingo

July

- 14: St. Bonaventure feast: Cochiti
- 25: Santiago feast: Taos
- 26: St. Anne feast: Laguna, Santa Ana, Taos
- 28: Peoples' Day: Pojoaque, Santa Ana

August

- 2: San Persingula feast: Jemez
- 4: Santo Domingo feast: Santo Domingo
- 9: San Lorenzo feast: Picuris
- 10: Pueblo Revolt anniversary and San Lorenzo feast: Acoma, Picuris
- 12: Santa Clara feast: Santa Clara
- 15: Assumption of Our Blessed Mother feast: Laguna, Zia
- 28: San Augustine feast: Isleta

September

- 2: San Estevan feast: Acoma
- 4: San Augustine feast: Isleta
- 8: Nativity of the Blessed Virgin feast: Laguna, San Ildefonso
- 14: Ohkay Owingeh Pueblo
- 19: St. Joseph feast: Laguna
- 25: St. Elizabeth feast: Laguna
- 29: San Geronimo Eve feast: Taos
- 30: San Geronimo feast: Taos

October

- 4: St. Francis of Assisi feast: Nambé
- 17: St. Margaret Mary feast: Laguna
- 24–27: Laguna

November

- 12: San Diego feast: Jemez, Tesuque
- Thanksgiving Weekend: Acoma
- Thanksgiving Day: Christmas light parade: Zuni

December

- 11: Nuestra Senora de Guadalupe feast: Pojoaque
- 12: Our Lady of Guadalupe feast: Jemez, Pojoaque, Santa Clara, Tesuque
- 24: Christmas Eve celebration: Acoma, Laguna Nambé, Ohkay Owingeh, Picuris, San Felipe, Santa Ana, Taos, Tesuque
- 25: Christmas Day: Cochiti, Ohkay Owingeh, Picuris, Santo Domingo, San Ildefonso, Tesuque, Zia
- 25–27: Cochiti, Laguna
- 26: Ohkay Owingeh
- 26–28: Christmas dances at most pueblos
- 28: Holy Innocents Day: Ohkay Owingeh, Picuris

== See also ==
- All Pueblo Council of Governors
- Ancestral Puebloan dwellings
- Ancestral Puebloans
- Pueblo Revolt
- Pueblo music
- Pueblo architecture
- Pueblo pottery
- Pueblo Lands Act
