= Debbie Rodella =

American politician (born 1961)

Member of the New Mexico House of Representatives from the 41st district
- In office 1993–2018
- Succeeded by: Susan K. Herrera

Personal details
- Born: November 28, 1961 (age 64) Española, New Mexico, U.S.
- Party: Democratic
- Spouse: Thomas Rodella
- Education: Northern New Mexico Community College (AS)

Debbie A. Rodella (born November 28, 1961) is an American politician who served as a member of the New Mexico House of Representatives from 1993 to 2018. A Democrat, she represented Legislative District 41 located in Rio Arriba, Santa Fe, and Taos Counties. In 2018, she was defeated for renomination in the Democratic primary by Susan K. Herrera.

== Early life and education ==
A native and lifelong resident of Española, New Mexico, Rodella received her associate degree from Northern New Mexico Community College and attended the College of Santa Fe.

== Career ==
She worked as a materials science technician and as a secretary. Rodella is married to Thomas Rodella, the former sheriff of Rio Arriba County who was removed from office after his federal felony convictions in September 2014 on civil rights charges. They have two children.

=== New Mexico House of Representatives ===
Rodella was first elected to the 70-seat New Mexico House of Representatives in 1992. Running unopposed in both primary and general elections since 2006, Rodella was re-elected to a twelfth consecutive two-year term in November 2014. Rodella served as the chair of the House Business & Industry Committee, Interim Chair of the Economic and Rural Development Committee, and a member of both the Voters & Elections and the Rules & Order of Business Committees. In 2013, Rodella voted with Republicans to block a same-sex marriage bill in committee, and against a bill (which passed) to reduce the penalties for the possession of marijuana. Rep. Rodella has been accused of sharing funds contributed to her re-election campaigns with her husband, to use in his own races for political office.

In the 2018 Democratic primary, Rodella ran for re-election but lost to Susan K. Herrera.
