= Northern New Mexico College =

Public college in Española, New Mexico, U.S.

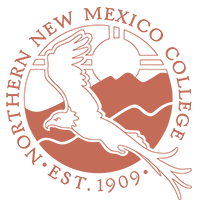
- Former names: Spanish American Normal School (1909–1953); Northern New Mexico Normal School (1953–1959); Northern New Mexico State School (1959–1970); New Mexico Technical Vocational School (1970–1977); Northern New Mexico Community College (1977–2005)
- Type: Public college
- Established: 1909
- President: Hector Balderas
- Provost: Ivan Lopez Hurtado
- Students: 1,100 (2017)
- Location: Española, New Mexico, U.S.
- Campus: El Rito, New Mexico Española, New Mexico
- Colors: Rust & Dark Blue
- Nickname: Eagles
- Sporting affiliations: NAIA – Cal Pac
- Website: www.nnmc.edu

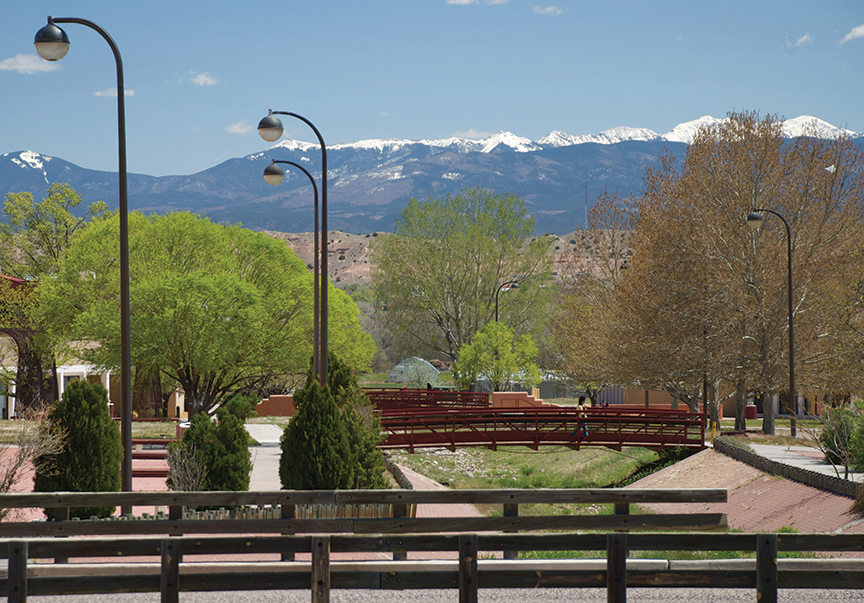
Main campus

Northern New Mexico College is a public college in Española, New Mexico.

== History ==
Northern was founded in El Rito, New Mexico in 1909 as the Spanish American Normal School, with the original mission of providing teacher training for the area's Spanish speakers. The college's original mission and Constitutional charter makes Northern the first Hispanic-serving institution in the United States. Northern opened its Española campus in 1971 and expanded its mission to include technical vocational programs, eventually becoming the state's first designated community college.

In 2004, new legislation allowed Northern to offer a baccalaureate program in Elementary Education. In 2005, legislation was enacted which changed the name to Northern New Mexico College, permitting it to offer four-year degrees in any program deemed necessary and appropriate. Between then and today, 11 more baccalaureate programs were approved. The main campus is now in Española; the El Rito campus is open and active with hands-on technical trades programs.

In 2019, the New Mexico Legislature unanimously approved NNMC's creation of the NNMC Branch Community College. Also in 2019 Rio Arriba and Santa Fe County voters approved an annual mill levy to establish and sustain associate degree programs in trades at Northern. The first programs to be implemented were plumbing/pipefitting and electrical, with the hands-on portion of those programs taking place on the college's El Rito campus. The Mill Levy also provides for the expansion of dual credit and trades education opportunities for residents of the Española, Pojoaque, Chama Valley, Mesa Vista, and Jemez Mountain School districts, including free transportation to and from Northern's campuses.

== Academics ==
Northern New Mexico College primarily serves rural communities from within a 40-mile (64 km) radius of the main campus in Española, including eight Native American Pueblos, in one of the most underserved areas in the state. Now one of the state's four regional comprehensive institutions, it offers more than 50 bachelor's, associate, and certificate programs. In addition, the college has reintroduced technical trades programs in electrical and plumbing/pipefitting, in partnership with two local unions and five public school districts through its new co-located Branch Community College, the first of its kind in the state's history.

Northern's Continuing Education program, through partnerships with the New Mexico Department of Workforce Solutions, the Southwest Regional Council of Carpenters and the Regional Development Corporation, offers hands-on training camps for in carpentry, welding and linemen skills.

The college is organized into two schools:

- The School of STEM-H (Science, Technology, Engineering, Math, and Health)
- The School of Liberal Arts, Business, and Education

In 2019, NNMC's co-located Branch Community College added the Department of Technical Trades, currently offering Electrical and Plumbing Technology programs.

Its student body is predominantly Hispanic (74%) and is 38% male and 62% female. It is a member of the Hispanic Association of Colleges and Universities.

=== Accreditation ===
Northern is accredited by the Higher Learning Commission to grant associate and bachelor's degrees. Additional accreditations include:

- The Bachelor of Engineering in Information Engineering Technology Program is accredited by the Engineering Technology Accreditation Commission (ETAC) of ABET
- The associate degree Nursing Program is accredited by the Accreditation Commission for Education in Nursing.
- The Bachelor in Nursing (RN-BSN) is accredited by the Commission on Collegiate Nursing Education.
- The Department of Business Administration's bachelor's and associate degree programs are accredited by the Accreditation Council for Business Schools and Programs
- The Department of Education is accredited based on the National Council for Accreditation of Teacher Education (NCATE) standards from November 2016 to Spring 2023.

Additionally, the college's occupational courses are approved by the New Mexico State Department of Public Education and the barbering, cosmetology, and nursing programs are approved by their respective state licensing boards.

== Campuses ==
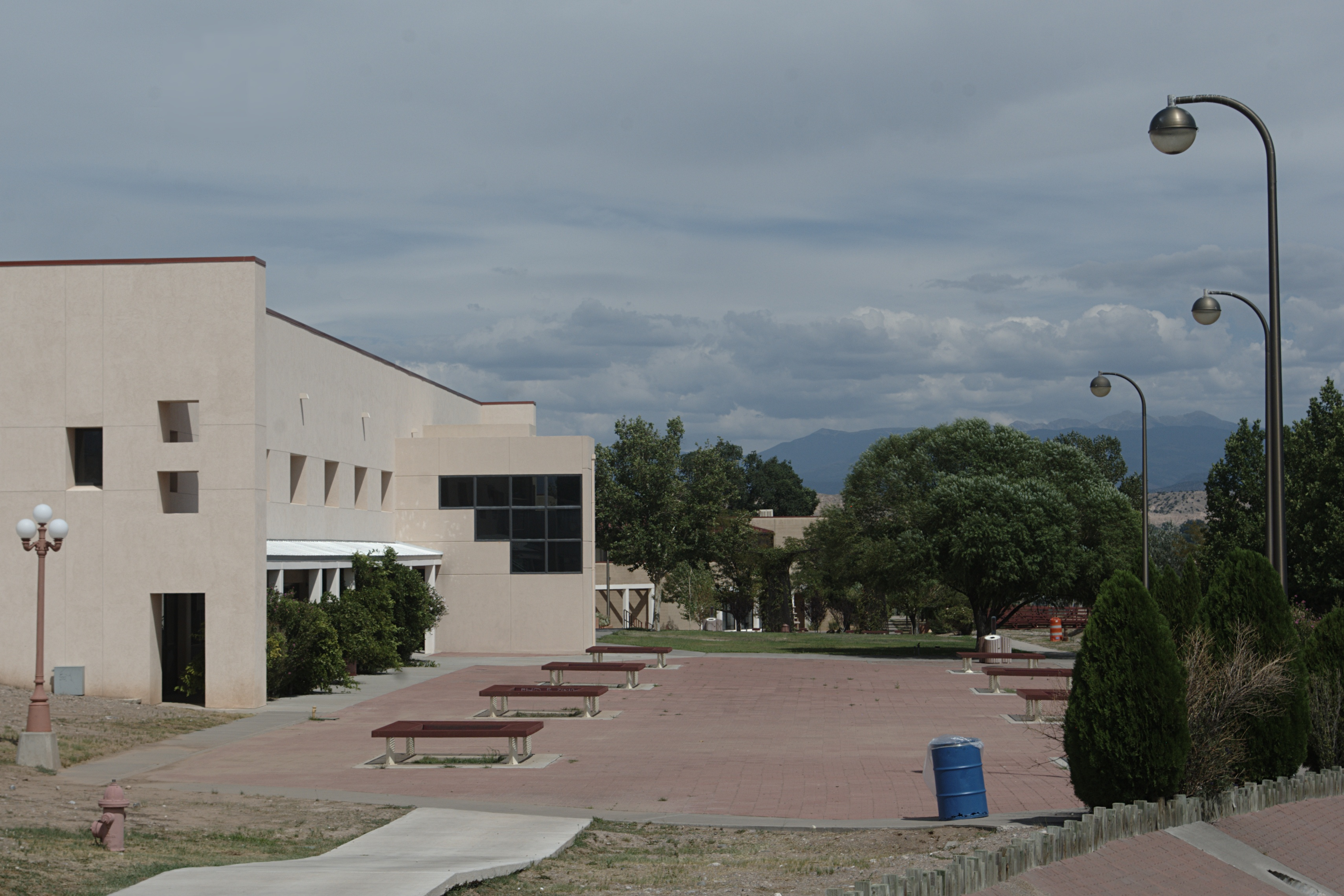
Española Campus in 2011, Administration Building on left.

The primary campus in Española, consists of a 200-acre (810,000 m^{2}) tract extending from U.S. Highway 84/285 to the banks of the Rio Grande. It is approximately 25 miles (40 km) north of Santa Fe.

The El Rito campus is Northern's historical campus. It is 25 miles (40 km) north of Española.

== Student life ==
Undergraduate demographics as of Fall 2023
| Race and ethnicity | Total |
|---|---|
| Hispanic | 68% |
| White | 12% |
| American Indian/Alaska Native | 9% |
| Two or more races | 5% |
| Asian | 2% |
| Unknown | 2% |
| Black | 1% |
| International student | 1% |
Economic diversity
| Low-income (Note: The percentage of students who received an income-based federal Pell grant intended for low-income students.) | 49% |
| Affluent (Note: The percentage of students who are a part of the American middle class at the bare minimum.) | 51% |

== Governance ==
Northern New Mexico's president is former New Mexico Attorney General Hector Balderas. He reports to a board of regents whose members are appointed by the governor of New Mexico.

== Athletics ==
The Northern New Mexico athletic teams are called The Eagles. The college is a member of the National Association of Intercollegiate Athletics (NAIA), primarily competing as an NAIA Independent within the Continental Athletic Conference since the 2009–10 academic year.

Northern New Mexico competes in eight intercollegiate varsity sports: Men's sports include basketball, cross country and golf; while women's sports include basketball, cheerleading, cross country, dance and golf.

=== History ===
The athletics department was launched in 2005. The Eagles began their first competitive men's and women's basketball seasons in 2009.

== Notable alumni ==
- Phillip Archuleta, New Mexico state legislator
- Valerie Espinoza, New Mexico Public Regulation Commissioner
- Debbie Rodella, New Mexico state legislator
- Jenelle Roybal, Governor of the Pueblo of Pojoaque
- Jacob Torres, Engineer and Plant Scientist at Kennedy Space Center in Florida
- Rose B. Simpson, Artist,
