= Susan K. Herrera =

American politician

Susan Herrera

Member of the New Mexico House of Representatives 41st district
- In office January 15, 2019 – July 27, 2026
- Preceded by: Debbie Rodella
- Succeeded by: Yolanda Jaramillo

Personal details
- Party: Democratic

Susan K. Herrera is an American politician who served as a member of the New Mexico House of Representatives for the 41st district, which includes portions of Rio Arriba, Santa Fe County, and Taos counties.

== Career ==
Prior to entering politics, Hererra worked as a senior associate at Northern Community Development Consulting Associates. She also served as the executive director of the Los Alamos National Laboratory Foundation and director of the Northern New Mexico Community College Foundation.

Herrera was an employee of University of New Mexico Nursing Department. Herrera was elected to the New Mexico House of Representatives in November 2018 and assumed office on January 15, 2019, succeeding incumbent Democrat Debbie Rodella.

Herrera resigned from the New Mexico House in July 2026 with the aim of giving the winner of the Democratic primary for her seat an earlier start in the legislature.

== Personal life ==
Herrera lives in Embudo, New Mexico.
