= Aboriginal title in New Mexico =

Aboriginal land title in New Mexico is unique among aboriginal title in the United States. Congressional legislation was passed to define such title after the United States acquired this territory following war with Mexico (1846–1848). But the Supreme Court of the New Mexico Territory and the United States Supreme Court held that the Nonintercourse Act did not restrict the alienability of Pueblo lands.

When the Supreme Court reversed its position in 1913, the land title to much of the state was called into question. Congress responded in 1924 and 1933 with compromise legislation to extinguish some aboriginal title and to establish procedures for determination and compensation.

== History ==
=== Spanish and Mexican rule ===
After making contact with the Pueblo in 1541, the Spanish generally acknowledged the property rights of the people. In 1689, the King of Spain granted some type of formal title to the Pueblo.

=== U.S. territory ===
Mexico ceded most of modern-day New Mexico to the United States in 1848 under the Treaty of Guadalupe Hidalgo. Three years later, in 1851, Congress explicitly extended the Nonintercourse Act to the territory of New Mexico. Despite this, during the territorial period, the highest court in the territory three times, and the U.S. Supreme Court once, consistently held that the Pueblo could sell their lands without Congressional consent.

=== Statehood ===
New Mexico became a state in 1912. The enabling act provided: "'Indian' and 'Indian country' shall include the pueblo Indians of New Mexico and the lands now owned and occupied by them." The New Mexico Constitution provided a similar guarantee to Pueblo land tenure:

The people inhabiting this state do agree and declare that they forever disclaim all right and title ... to all lands lying within said boundaries owned or held by any Indian or Indian tribes, the right or title to which shall have been acquired through the United States, or any prior sovereignty; and that until the title of such Indian or Indian tribes shall have been extinguished the same shall be and remain subject to the disposition and under the absolute jurisdiction and control of the congress of the United States.

==== United States v. Sandoval (U.S. 1913) ====
In United States v. Sandoval (1913), the Supreme Court recanted nearly all of its analysis from United States v. Joseph (1877). By the time of the Sandoval decision, the Senate estimated, 3,000 non-Indians had purchased Pueblo lands. The prevailing legal view was that the Pueblo could not obtain ejectment against those settlers. Congress responded with the Pueblo Lands Act of 1924.

== The Pueblo Lands Act (1924) ==
Congress passed the Pueblo Lands Act on June 7, 1924. The Senate and House reports described the purpose of the act as "to provide for the final adjudication and settlement of a very complicated and difficult series of conflicting titles affecting lands claimed by the Pueblo Indians of New Mexico".

The act created a Public Lands Board composed of: the Attorney General, Interior Secretary, and a third member to be appointed by the president. The act further provided that the Pueblo's aboriginal title would be extinguished over lands deemed adversely possessed by non-Indians from 1889 to 1924 (with payment of taxes) or 1902 to 1924 (with color of title). In addition to statute of limitations/adverse possession, the act preserved any "equitable defenses which [the claimants] may have or have had under the laws of the Territory and State of New Mexico". Decisions of the Lands Board could be enforced by quiet title suits in the United States District Court for the District of New Mexico.

Further, the act provided for compensation to the Pueblos if they "could have been at any time recovered for said Indians by the United States by seasonable prosecution". Non-Indians also received full compensation if they acquired title before 1912 and compensation for improvements if after 1912.

Prospectively, for post-1924 conveyances, § 17 of the act provided:

No right, title, or interest in or to the lands of the Pueblo Indians of New Mexico to which their title has not been extinguished as hereinbefore determined shall hereafter be acquired or initiated by virtue of the laws of the State of New Mexico, or in any other manner except as may hereafter be provided by Congress, and no sale, grant, lease of any character, or other conveyance of lands, or any title or claim thereto, made by any pueblo as a community, or any Pueblo Indian living in a community of Pueblo Indians, in the State of New Mexico, shall be of any validity in law or in equity unless the same be first approved by the Secretary of the Interior.

On at least two occasions, Congress passed legislation approving post-1924 conveyances. In several early cases, the Pueblo Lands Act was applied to dismiss Pueblo land claims, brought as ejectment or trespass, in federal court. The Pueblo had more mixed success litigating quiet title claims under the act, especially where the federal government sued in its trust capacity. The Pueblo had no success in challenging the compensation calculations performed by the Board.

=== United States v. Candelaria (U.S. 1926) ===
In United States v. Candelaria (1926), the Supreme Court held that § 4 of the Lands Act provided the only affirmative defense that could be raised by land owners in a Nonintercourse Act/quiet title suit initiated by the federal government on behalf of the Pueblos, concerning pre-1924 conveyances.

=== Mountain States Tel. & Tel. Co. v. Pueblo of Santa Ana (U.S. 1985) ===
In 1985, the Supreme Court held that, under the Pueblo Lands Act, the Interior Secretary had the power to approve conveyances of interests in Pueblo lands. Thus, the Court reversed the Tenth Circuit, which had affirmed partial summary judgement to the Pueblos in seeking trespass damages against a telephone company whose agreement with the Pueblos had not been approved by Congress.

== 1926 condemnation act ==
On May 10, 1926 Congress passed an act providing:

That lands of the Pueblo Indians of New Mexico, the Indian title to which has not been extinguished, may be condemned for any public purpose and for any purpose for which lands may be condemned under the laws of the State of New Mexico, and the money awarded as damages shall be paid to the superintendent or officer in charge for the benefit of the particular tribe, community, or pueblo holding title to same: Provided, however, That the Federal courts of said State of the district within which such lands are located shall have and retain jurisdiction of all proceedings for the condemnation of such lands ...

The Tenth Circuit has held that this act was repealed by implication two years later. The repeal in question was effected independently by two acts, passed in 1928 and 1948 respectively.

== The 1933 amendments ==
Congress amended the 1924 act in 1933. The amendments allowed the Pueblos to sue in their own name and increased the amount of compensation the federal government would pay. Moreover, the amendments authorized the Interior Secretary to offer the Pueblos monetary compensation in exchange for relinquishing legal claims.

=== New Mexico v. Aamodt (10th Cir. 1976) ===
The Tenth Circuit held in 1976 that neither the 1926 nor 1933 acts extinguished the water rights of the Pueblo.

During the late 20th century, Pueblo litigants have prevailed in cases concerning land titles that they have been deemed to have adversely possessed during the Spanish era.

== Court of Claims litigation ==
The Pueblo have been awarded some compensation by the Court of Federal Claims (and its predecessor, the Court of Claims). In earlier cases, the Court of Claims had held that decisions of the Lands Board prevented compensation.
