= Indian Pueblo Cultural Center =

Coordinates: 35.1105°N 106.6588°W

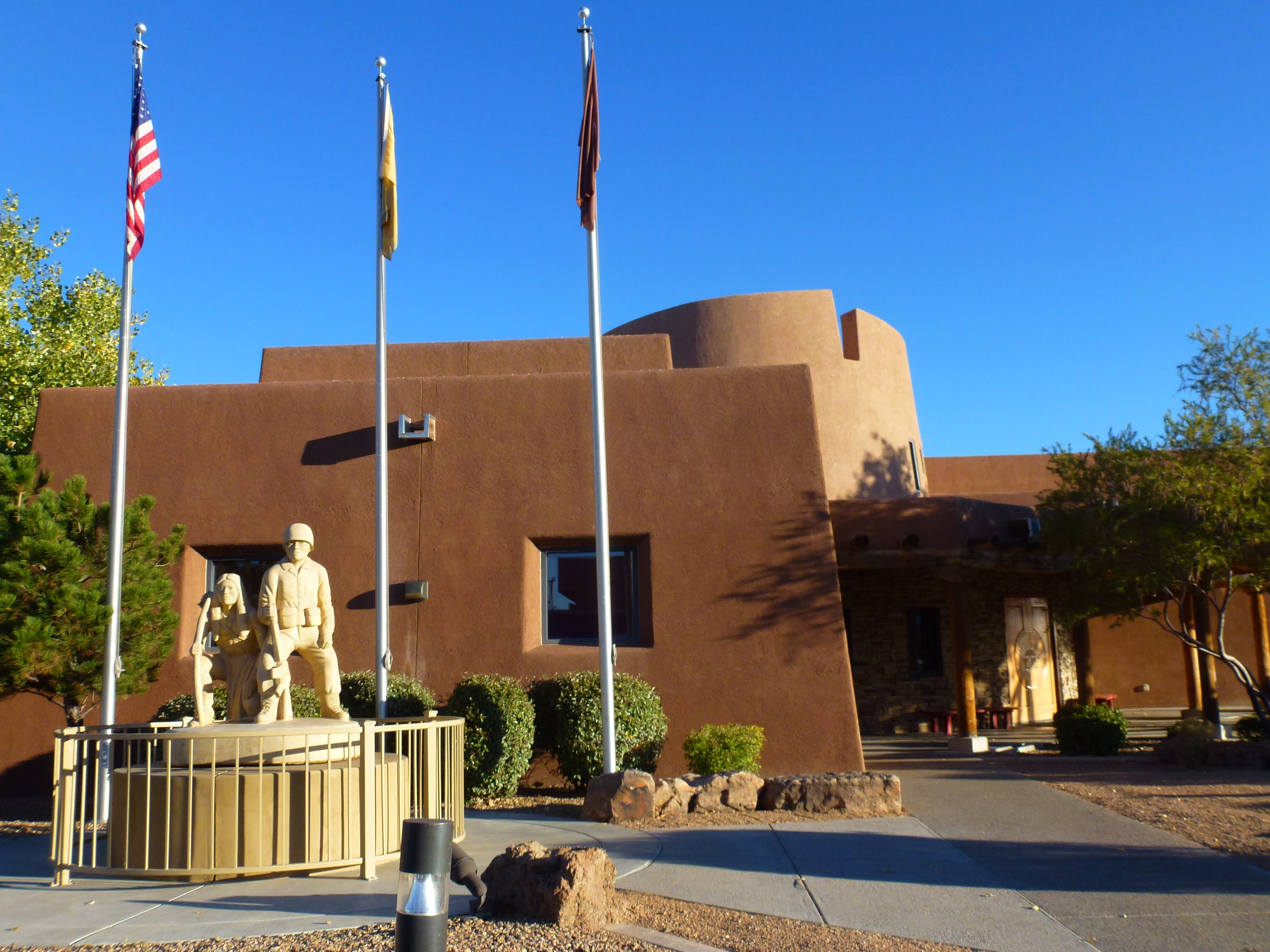
- Founded: 1976

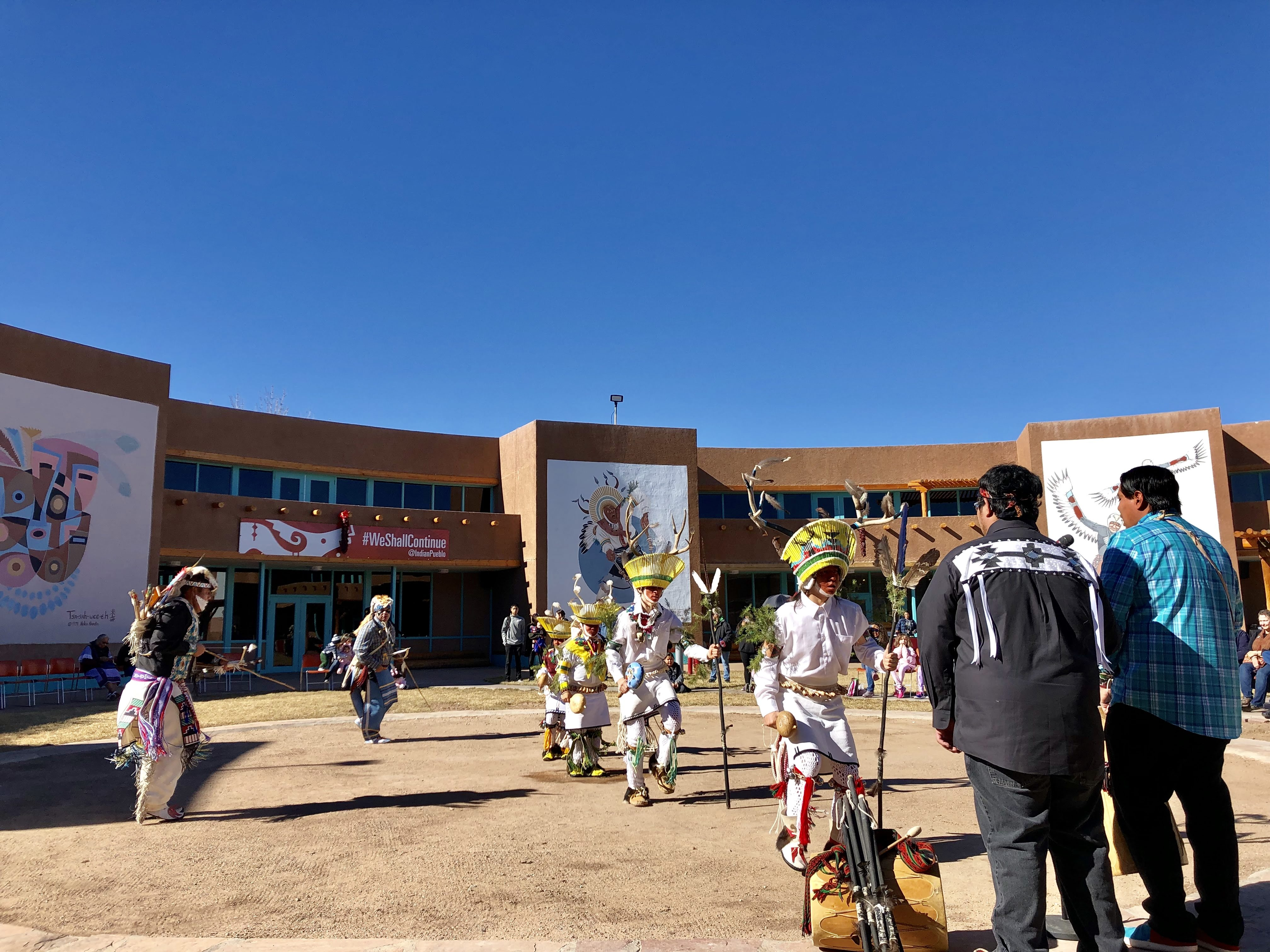
Ohkay Owingeh Deer Dancers at the Indian Pueblo Cultural Center

The Indian Pueblo Cultural Center, located in Albuquerque, is owned and operated by the 19 Indian Pueblos of New Mexico and dedicated to the preservation and perpetuation of Pueblo Indian culture, history, and art. The Indian Pueblo Cultural Center is a nonprofit organization that opened in August 1976. The IPCC includes a museum, cultural exhibitions, the Indian Pueblo Kitchen restaurant, a retail arts store and offers a wide range of educational and cultural events. It is part of a large business hub owned by the 19 Pueblos of New Mexico.

== Mission statement and philosophy ==
The Indian Pueblo Cultural Center (IPCC) provides a place for people to experience and celebrate Pueblo culture and supports economic opportunities for Pueblo and surrounding local communities. The Indian Pueblo Cultural Center operates according to its C.R.A.V.E. Principles which are: Commitment to Pueblo Culture, Responsiveness, Authenticity, Vigilance, and Empowerment. This principle helps guide daily operations and guest experiences at the IPCC.

== Campus and expansion ==
The Indian Pueblo Cultural Center Campus includes the museum, galleries, Indian Pueblo Kitchen restaurant, library and the Indian Pueblo Store. Nearby business' also owned by Indian Pueblos Marketing Inc. which include retail stores, restaurants and the Avanyu Plaza business hub.

== Permanent museum exhibitions ==
The center includes a 10,000 sq ft (1,000 m^{2}) museum of the authentic history and artifacts of traditional Pueblo cultures and their contemporary art. To celebrate the 40th anniversary of the center, an exhibit titled "We are of This Place: The Pueblo Story" opened on April 2, 2016. The permanent exhibit highlights the creativity and adaptation which made possible the survival, diversity and achievements of each of the 19 Pueblos.

== Rotating museum exhibitions ==
The center also includes a small, changing exhibit that highlights the work of living traditional and contemporary artists. Traditional Indian dances and artist demonstrations are open to the public on Saturday and Sunday. The Artists Circle Gallery features rotating exhibits such as "HERitage: Pueblo Women Paving Cultural Pathways" and "ReLocated: Urban Migration, Perseverance and Adaptation."

In 2022, the center featured an exhibition titled, Pivot, featured painted skateboard decks created by younger Native artists. Also in 2022, the center received a $100,000 grant from the National Endowment for the Arts to fund new staff positions, and allow the institution to devote more of their resources to public programming.

== Cultural dance programs ==
The Indian Pueblo Cultural Center hosts cultural dances year-round, seasonal art markets, annual events and celebrations. A calendar of Events can be found at the center's website. These dances are open to the public and often invite audience participation.

== Indian Pueblo Kitchen ==
Inside the Indian Pueblo Cultural Center, the Indian Pueblo Kitchen provides a menu that highlights traditional and contemporary Pueblo foods.

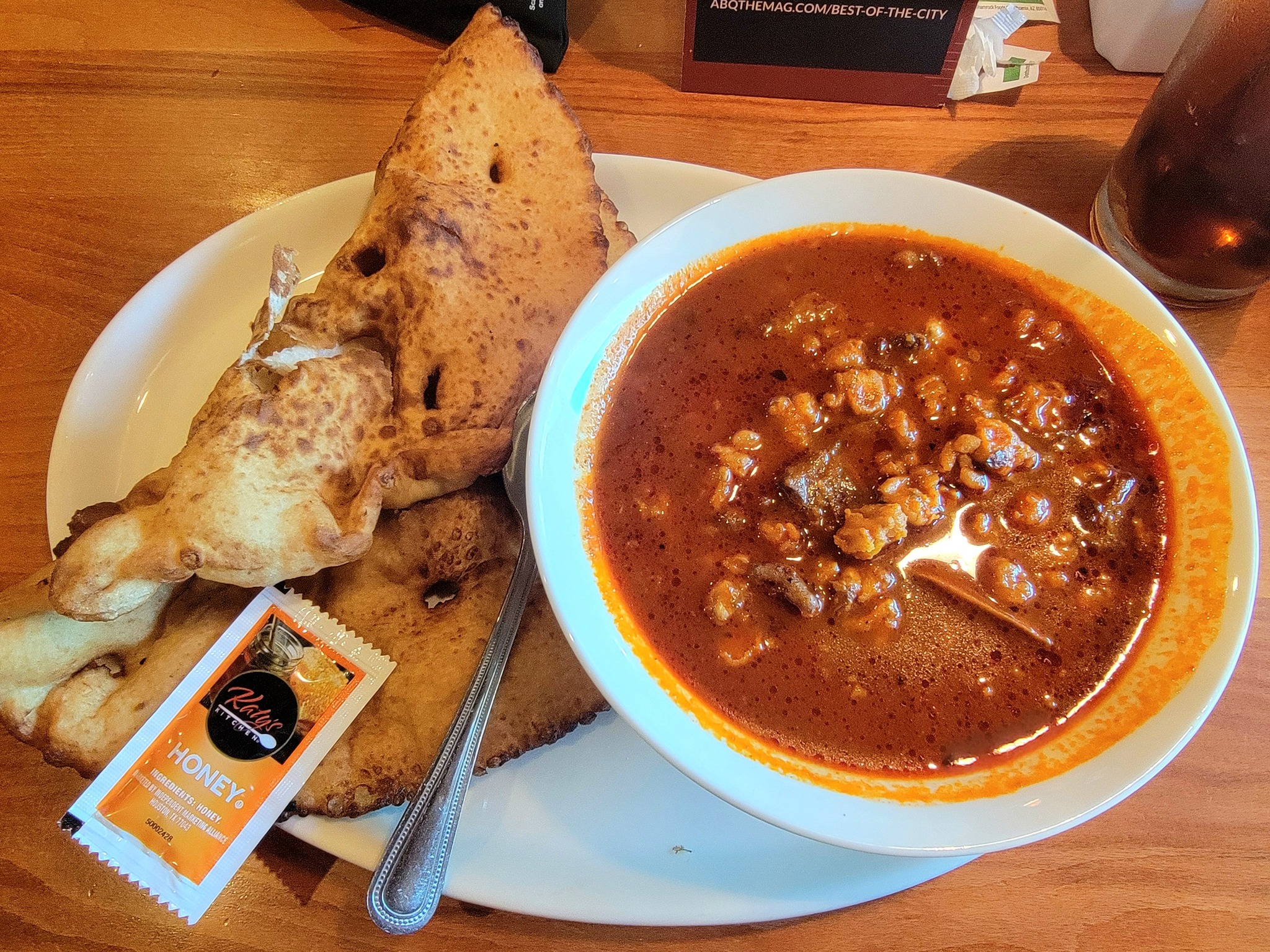
Indian Pueblo Kitchen
