= 2022 New Mexico House of Representatives election =

- November 8, 2022

All 70 seats in the New Mexico House of Representatives 36 seats needed for a majority

	Majority party	Minority party
Leader	Brian Egolf (retired)	Jim Townsend
Party	Democratic	Republican
Leader since	January 17, 2017	January 15, 2019
Leader's seat	47th - Santa Fe	54th - Artesia
Seats before	45	24
Seats after	45	25
Seat change	Steady	▲1
Popular vote	355,314	266,240
Percentage	56.07%	42.02%
- Results: Democratic hold Democratic gain Republican hold Republican gain
Speaker before election
Brian Egolf
Democratic
Elected Speaker
Javier Martínez
Democratic

The 2022 New Mexico House of Representatives election took place on November 8, 2022, as part of the biennial United States elections. All 70 seats in the New Mexico House of Representatives were up for election. The election coincided with elections for other offices including the United States House of Representatives, governor, attorney general, and secretary of state. The primary election was held on June 7, 2022.

== Predictions ==
Source	Ranking	As of
Sabato's Crystal Ball	Likely D	May 19, 2022

== Results summary ==
District	Incumbent	Party	Elected representative	Party
1	Rod Montoya	Rep	Rod Montoya (Note: Unopposed in the November general election.)	Rep
2	James Strickler	Rep	Mark Duncan	Rep
3	Ryan Lane	Rep	Ryan Lane	Rep
4	Anthony Allison	Dem	Anthony Allison	Dem
5	Doreen Wonda Johnson	Dem	Doreen Wonda Johnson	Dem
6	Eliseo Alcon	Dem	Eliseo Alcon	Dem
7	Kelly Fajardo	Rep	Tanya Mirabal Moya	Rep
8	Brian Baca	Rep	Brian Baca	Rep
9	Patricia Lundstrom	Dem	Patricia Lundstrom	Dem
10	Andrés Romero	Dem	Andrés Romero	Dem
11	Javier Martínez	Dem	Javier Martínez	Dem
12	Art De La Cruz	Dem	Art De La Cruz	Dem
13	Patricia Roybal Caballero	Dem	Patricia Roybal Caballero	Dem
14	Miguel Garcia	Dem	Miguel Garcia	Dem
15	Dayan Hochman-Vigil	Dem	Dayan Hochman-Vigil	Dem
15	Deborah Armstrong	Dem	Dayan Hochman-Vigil	Dem
16	Moe Maestas	Dem	Moe Maestas	Dem
17	New Seat		Cynthia Borrego	Dem
18	Gail Chasey	Dem	Gail Chasey	Dem
19	Kay Bounkeua	Dem	Janelle Anyanonu	Dem
20	Meredith Dixon	Dem	Meredith Dixon	Dem
21	Debra Sariñana	Dem	Debra Sariñana	Dem
22	Stefani Lord	Rep	Stefani Lord	Rep
23	New Seat		Alan Martinez	Rep
24	Liz Thomson	Dem	Liz Thomson	Dem
25	Christine Trujillo	Dem	Christine Trujillo	Dem
26	Georgene Louis	Dem	Eleanor Chavez	Dem
27	Marian Matthews	Dem	Marian Matthews	Dem
28	Pamelya Herndon	Dem	Pamelya Herndon	Dem
29	Joy Garratt	Dem	Joy Garratt	Dem
30	Natalie Figueroa	Dem	Natalie Figueroa	Dem
31	Bill Rehm	Rep	Bill Rehm	Rep
32	Candie Sweetser	Dem	Jenifer Jones	Rep
33	Micaela Lara Cadena	Dem	Micaela Lara Cadena	Dem
34	Raymundo Lara	Dem	Raymundo Lara	Dem
35	Angelica Rubio	Dem	Angelica Rubio	Dem
36	Nathan Small	Dem	Nathan Small	Dem
37	Joanne Ferrary	Dem	Joanne Ferrary	Dem
38	Rebecca Dow	Rep	Tara Jaramillo	Dem
39	Luis Terrazas	Rep	Luis Terrazas	Rep
40	Roger Montoya	Dem	Joseph Sanchez	Dem
41	Susan Herrera	Dem	Susan Herrera	Dem
42	Kristina Ortez	Dem	Kristina Ortez	Dem
43	Christine Chandler	Dem	Christine Chandler	Dem
44	Jane Powdrell-Culbert	Rep	Kathleen Cates	Dem
44	Daymon Ely	Dem	Kathleen Cates	Dem
45	Linda Serrato	Dem	Linda Serrato	Dem
46	Andrea Romero	Dem	Andrea Romero	Dem
47	Brian Egolf	Dem	Reena Szczepanski	Dem
48	Tara Lujan	Dem	Tara Lujan	Dem
49	Gail Armstrong	Rep	Gail Armstrong	Rep
50	Matthew McQueen	Dem	Matthew McQueen	Dem
51	Rachel Black	Rep	John Block	Rep
52	Doreen Gallegos	Dem	Doreen Gallegos	Dem
53	Willie Madrid	Dem	Willie Madrid	Dem
54	Jim Townsend	Rep	Jim Townsend	Rep
55	Cathrynn Brown	Rep	Cathrynn Brown	Rep
56	Zachary Cook	Rep	Harlan Vincent	Rep
57	Jason Harper	Rep	Jason Harper	Rep
58	Candy Ezzell	Rep	Candy Ezzell	Rep
59	Greg Nibert	Rep	Greg Nibert	Rep
60	Joshua Hernandez	Rep	Joshua Hernandez	Rep
61	Randall Pettigrew	Rep	Randall Pettigrew	Rep
62	Larry Scott	Rep	Larry Scott	Rep
63	Martin Zamora	Rep	Martin Zamora	Rep
64	Randal Crowder	Rep	Andrea Reeb	Rep
65	Derrick Lente	Dem	Derrick Lente	Dem
66	Phelps Anderson	Ind	Jimmy Mason	Rep
67	Jackey Chatfield	Rep	Jackey Chatfield	Rep
68	Karen Bash	Dem	Charlotte Little	Dem
69	Harry Garcia	Dem	Harry Garcia	Dem
70	Ambrose Castellano	Dem	Ambrose Castellano	Dem

Party	Candi- dates	Votes		Seats		
Party	Candi- dates	No.	%	No.	+/–	%
Democratic	54	355,314	56.07	45	Steady	64.29
Republican	50	266,240	42.02	25	▲1	35.71
Independent/Write-in	7	10,798	1.70	0	▼1	0.00
Libertarian	1	1,319	0.21	0	Steady	0.00
Total	112	633,671	100%	70	Steady	100%

House seats
Democratic	64.29%
Republican	35.71%

Popular vote
Democratic	56.07%
Republican	42.02%
Independent/Write-in	1.70%
Libertarian	0.21%

=== Closest races ===
Seats where the margin of victory was under 10%:

1. District 68, 0.32%
2. District 32, 0.6% gain
3. District 38, 1.38% gain
4. District 44, 2.04% gain
5. District 53, 2.1%
6. District 57, 3.64%
7. District 36, 4.16%
8. District 28, 4.64%
9. District 17, 5.6% gain
10. District 29, 6.46%
11. District 39, 6.58%
12. District 23, 7.18% gain
13. District 27, 8.2%
14. District 30, 9.74%
15. District 31, 9.86%

== Retiring incumbents ==
=== Democrats ===
1. District 17: Deborah Armstrong retired.
2. District 19: Kay Bounkeua retired.
3. District 23: Daymon Ely retired.
4. District 26: Georgene Louis retired.
5. District 47: Brian Egolf retired.
6. District 68: Karen Bash retired.

=== Independents ===
1. District 66: Phelps Anderson retired.

=== Republicans ===
1. District 2: James Strickler retired.
2. District 7: Kelly Fajardo retired.
3. District 38: Rebecca Dow retired to run for governor of New Mexico.
4. District 56: Zachary Cook retired.
5. District 64: Randal Crowder retired.

=== Incumbents defeated in primaries ===
==== Democrats ====
1. District 40: Roger Montoya lost renomination to Joseph Sanchez.

==== Republicans ====
1. District 51: Rachel Black lost renomination to John Block.

=== Newly created seats ===
- District 17 (Bernalillo County), won by Cynthia Borrego (D)
- District 23 (Sandoval County), won by Alan Martinez (R)

== Detailed results ==
Source for primary election results:

Source for general election results:

=== District 1 ===
Incumbent Republican Rod Montoya had represented the 1st district since 2015.

New Mexico House of Representatives 1st District general election, 2022
Party	Candidate	Votes	%
Republican	Rod Montoya (incumbent)	9,182	100%
Total votes		9,182	100%
Republican hold			

=== District 2 ===
Incumbent Republican James Strickler had represented the 2nd district since 2007. Strickler did not seek re-election.

New Mexico House of Representatives 2nd District general election, 2022
Party	Candidate	Votes	%
Republican	Mark Duncan	5,468	70.20%
Independent	Matt Dodson	2,321	29.80%
Total votes		7,789	100%
Republican hold			

=== District 3 ===
Incumbent Republican Ryan Lane had represented the 3rd district since 2021.

New Mexico House of Representatives 3rd District general election, 2022
Party	Candidate	Votes	%
Republican	Ryan Lane (incumbent)	8,272	100%
Total votes		8,272	100%
Republican hold			

=== District 4 ===
Incumbent Democrat Anthony Allison had represented the 4th district since 2019. Christina Aspaas unsuccessfully challenged Allison for the Democratic nomination. Democratic primary

New Mexico House of Representatives 4th District Democratic primary election, 2022
Party	Candidate	Votes	%
Democratic	Anthony Allison (incumbent)	817	65.15%
Democratic	Christina Aspaas	437	34.85%
Total votes		1,254	100%

General election

New Mexico House of Representatives 4th District general election, 2022
Party	Candidate	Votes	%
Democratic	Anthony Allison (incumbent)	5,993	100%
Total votes		5,993	100%
Democratic hold			

=== District 5 ===
Incumbent Democrat Doreen Wonda Johnson had represented the 5th district since 2015. Kevin Mitchell unsuccessfully challenged Johnson for the Democratic nomination. Democratic primary

New Mexico House of Representatives 5th District Democratic primary election, 2022
Party	Candidate	Votes	%
Democratic	Doreen Wonda Johnson (incumbent)	1,752	55.25%
Democratic	Kevin Mitchell	1,419	44.75%
Total votes		3,171	100%

General election

New Mexico House of Representatives 5th District general election, 2022
Party	Candidate	Votes	%
Democratic	Doreen Wonda Johnson (incumbent)	7,249	100%
Total votes		7,249	100%
Democratic hold			

=== District 6 ===
Incumbent Democrat Eliseo Alcon had represented the 6th district since 2009.

New Mexico House of Representatives 6th District general election, 2022
Party	Candidate	Votes	%
Democratic	Eliseo Alcon (incumbent)	4,925	62.67%
Republican	Jerri D. Rowe	2,934	37.33%
Total votes		7,859	100%
Democratic hold			

=== District 7 ===
Incumbent Republican Kelly Fajardo had represented the 7th district since 2013. Fajardo did not seek re-election.

New Mexico House of Representatives 7th District general election, 2022
Party	Candidate	Votes	%
Republican	Tanya Mirabal Moya	4,621	57.53%
Democratic	Danny M. Bernal Jr.	3,412	42.47%
Total votes		8,033	100%
Republican hold			

=== District 8 ===
Incumbent Republican Brian Baca had represented the 8th district since his appointment in 2022.

New Mexico House of Representatives 8th District general election, 2022
Party	Candidate	Votes	%
Republican	Brian Baca (incumbent)	8,503	98.15%
Democratic	Paul Matthew Kinzelman (write-in)	160	1.85%
Total votes		8,663	100%
Republican hold			

=== District 9 ===
Incumbent Democrat Patricia Lundstrom had represented the 9th district since 2003.

New Mexico House of Representatives 9th District general election, 2022
Party	Candidate	Votes	%
Democratic	Patricia Lundstrom (incumbent)	5,293	100%
Total votes		5,293	100%
Democratic hold			

=== District 10 ===
Incumbent Democrat Andrés Romero had represented the 10th district since 2015.

New Mexico House of Representatives 10th District general election, 2022
Party	Candidate	Votes	%
Democratic	Andrés Romero (incumbent)	4,506	58.58%
Republican	Mary Kay Ingham	3,186	41.42%
Total votes		7,692	100%
Democratic hold			

=== District 11 ===
Incumbent Democratic Majority Leader Javier Martínez had represented the 11th district since 2015. Lisa Meyer-Hagen defeated Adrian Anthony Trujillo Sr. for the Republican nomination. Republican primary

New Mexico House of Representatives 11th District Republican primary election, 2022
Party	Candidate	Votes	%
Republican	Lisa Meyer-Hagen	375	52.59%
Republican	Adrian Anthony Trujillo Sr.	338	47.41%
Total votes		713	100%

General election

New Mexico House of Representatives 11th District general election, 2022
Party	Candidate	Votes	%
Democratic	Javier Martínez (incumbent)	8,859	77.87%
Republican	Lisa Meyer-Hagen	2,518	22.13%
Total votes		11,377	100%
Democratic hold			

=== District 12 ===
Incumbent Democrat Art De La Cruz had represented the 12th district since his appointment in 2022. Melissa Armijo and Nicole Michelle Olonovich unsuccessfully challenged Cruz for the Democratic nomination. Democratic primary

New Mexico House of Representatives 12th District Democratic primary election, 2022
Party	Candidate	Votes	%
Democratic	Art De La Cruz (incumbent)	789	52.67%
Democratic	Meliisa Armijo	446	29.77%
Democratic	Nicole Michelle Olonovich	263	17.56%
Total votes		1,498	100%

General election

New Mexico House of Representatives 12th District general election, 2022
Party	Candidate	Votes	%
Democratic	Art De La Cruz (incumbent)	4,361	100%
Total votes		4,361	100%
Democratic hold			

=== District 13 ===
Incumbent Democrat Patricia Roybal Caballero had represented the 13th district since 2013.

New Mexico House of Representatives 13th District general election, 2022
Party	Candidate	Votes	%
Democratic	Patricia Roybal Caballero (incumbent)	3,889	100%
Total votes		3,889	100%
Democratic hold			

=== District 14 ===
Incumbent Democrat Miguel Garcia had represented the 14th district since 1997.

New Mexico House of Representatives 14th District general election, 2022
Party	Candidate	Votes	%
Democratic	Miguel Garcia (incumbent)	5,679	73.64%
Republican	Solomon Peña	2,033	26.36%
Total votes		7,712	100%
Democratic hold			

After losing the election to Garcia by 3,600 votes, Peña claimed he was the victim of election fraud and refused to concede. On January 16, 2023, he was charged with hiring four men to shoot at the houses of four Democratic politicians (New Mexico House Speaker Javier Martínez, state Senator Linda M. Lopez, and two Bernalillo County commissioners) in December 2022 and January 2023.

=== District 15 ===
The new 15th district includes the homes of incumbent Democrats Dayan Hochman-Vigil, who had represented the 15th district since 2019, and Deborah Armstrong, who had represented the 17th district since 2015. Armstrong did not seek re-election, and later resigned. Linda Garcia Benavides was appointed to fill the remainder of Armstrong's term.

New Mexico House of Representatives 15th District general election, 2022
Party	Candidate	Votes	%
Democratic	Dayan Hochman-Vigil (incumbent)	7,574	60.14%
Republican	Kimberly Ann Kaehr-Macmillan	4,386	34.83%
Independent	Laura E. Gutierrez	634	5.03%
Total votes		12,594	100%
Democratic hold			

=== District 16 ===
Incumbent Democrat Moe Maestas had represented the 16th district since 2007.

New Mexico House of Representatives 16th District general election, 2022
Party	Candidate	Votes	%
Democratic	Moe Maestas (incumbent)	7,575	100%
Total votes		7,575	100%
Democratic hold			

=== District 17 ===
The new 17th District was an open seat with no incumbent. Cynthia Borrego defeated Darrell Deaguero for the Democratic nomination. Ellis McMath defeated Joshua Taylor Neal for the Republican nomination. Borrego won the open seat. Democratic primary

New Mexico House of Representatives 17th District Democratic primary election, 2022
Party	Candidate	Votes	%
Democratic	Cynthia Borrego	1,131	59.40%
Democratic	Darrell Deaguero	773	40.60%
Total votes		1,904	100%

Republican primary

New Mexico House of Representatives 17th District Republican primary election, 2022
Party	Candidate	Votes	%
Republican	Ellis McMath	1,051	59.58%
Republican	Joshua Taylor Neal	713	40.42%
Total votes		1,764	100%

General election

New Mexico House of Representatives 17th District general election, 2022
Party	Candidate	Votes	%
Democratic	Cynthia Borrego	6,150	52.79%
Republican	Ellis McMath	5,499	47.21%
Total votes		11,649	100%
Democratic win (new seat)			

=== District 18 ===
Incumbent Democrat Gail Chasey had represented the 18th district since 1997.

New Mexico House of Representatives 18th District general election, 2022
Party	Candidate	Votes	%
Democratic	Gail Chasey (incumbent)	10,292	84.61%
Republican	Scott Troy Cannon	1,872	15.39%
Total votes		12,164	100%
Democratic hold			

=== District 19 ===
Incumbent Democrat Kay Bounkeua had represented the 19th district since her appointment in August 2021. Bounkeua did not seek re-election. Janelle Anyanonu defeated Colton Dean for the Democratic nomination. Democratic primary

New Mexico House of Representatives 19th District Democratic primary election, 2022
Party	Candidate	Votes	%
Democratic	Janelle Anyanonu	1,265	77.13%
Democratic	Colton Dean	375	22.87%
Total votes		1,640	100%

General election

New Mexico House of Representatives 19th District general election, 2022
Party	Candidate	Votes	%
Democratic	Janelle Anyanonu	4,014	63.31%
Republican	Kathleen M. Jackson	1,454	22.93%
Independent	Enrique Jesus Cardiel	872	13.75%
Total votes		6,340	100%
Democratic hold			

=== District 20 ===
Incumbent Democrat Meredith Dixon had represented the 20th district since 2021.

New Mexico House of Representatives 20th District general election, 2022
Party	Candidate	Votes	%
Democratic	Meredith Dixon (incumbent)	6,900	56.36%
Republican	Robert A. Salazar	5,343	43.64%
Total votes		12,243	100%
Democratic hold			

=== District 21 ===
Incumbent Democrat Debra Sariñana had represented the 21st district since 2017.

New Mexico House of Representatives 21st District general election, 2022
Party	Candidate	Votes	%
Democratic	Debra Sariñana (incumbent)	5,410	100%
Total votes		5,410	100%
Democratic hold			

=== District 22 ===
Incumbent Republican Stefani Lord had represented the 22nd district since 2021.

New Mexico House of Representatives 22nd District general election, 2022
Party	Candidate	Votes	%
Republican	Stefani Lord (incumbent)	8,816	56.14%
Democratic	Augustine Montoya	6,887	43.86%
Total votes		15,703	100%
Republican hold			

=== District 23 ===
The new 23rd district was an open seat that was expected to favor Republicans. Most constituents came from the former 44th district.

New Mexico House of Representatives 23rd District general election, 2022
Party	Candidate	Votes	%
Republican	Alan Martinez	7,242	53.59%
Democratic	Ramon Montano	6,271	46.41%
Total votes		13,513	100%
Republican win (new seat)			

=== District 24 ===
Incumbent Democrat Liz Thomson had represented the 24th district since 2017.

New Mexico House of Representatives 24th District general election, 2022
Party	Candidate	Votes	%
Democratic	Liz Thomson (incumbent)	7,545	59.28%
Republican	Khalid Emshadi	5,183	40.72%
Total votes		12,728	100%
Democratic hold			

=== District 25 ===
Incumbent Democrat Christine Trujillo had represented the 25th district since 2013.

New Mexico House of Representatives 25th District general election, 2022
Party	Candidate	Votes	%
Democratic	Christine Trujillo (incumbent)	9,187	100%
Total votes		9,187	100%
Democratic hold			

=== District 26 ===
Incumbent Democrat Georgene Louis had represented the 26th district since 2013. Louis did not seek re-election. Former representative Eleanor Chavez defeated Cherise Quezada for the Democratic nomination. Democratic primary

New Mexico House of Representatives 26th District Democratic primary election, 2022
Party	Candidate	Votes	%
Democratic	Eleanor Chavez	898	68.50%
Democratic	Cherise Quezada	413	31.50%
Total votes		1,311	100%

General election

New Mexico House of Representatives 26th District general election, 2022
Party	Candidate	Votes	%
Democratic	Eleanor Chavez	4,032	60.41%
Republican	Patrick Sais	2,642	39.59%
Total votes		6,674	100%
Democratic hold			

=== District 27 ===
Incumbent Democrat Marian Matthews had represented the 27th district since 2020. Robert Godshall defeated Elisa Maria Martinez for the Republican nomination. Republican primary

New Mexico House of Representatives th District Republican primary election, 2022
Party	Candidate	Votes	%
Republican	Robert Godshall	1,563	60.51%
Republican	Elisa Maria Martinez	1,020	39.49%
Total votes		2,583	100%

General election

New Mexico House of Representatives 27th District general election, 2022
Party	Candidate	Votes	%
Democratic	Marian Matthews (incumbent)	7,728	54.10%
Republican	Robert Godshall	6,556	45.90%
Total votes		14,284	100%
Democratic hold			

=== District 28 ===
Incumbent Democrat Pamelya Herndon had represented the 28th district since her appointment in June 2021.

New Mexico House of Representatives 28th District general election, 2022
Party	Candidate	Votes	%
Democratic	Pamelya Herndon (incumbent)	7,552	52.32%
Republican	Nicole Chavez	6,883	47.68%
Total votes		14,435	100%
Democratic hold			

=== District 29 ===
Incumbent Democrat Joy Garratt had represented the 29th district since 2019. Gregory Cunningham defeated Adelious De Stith for the Republican nomination. Republican primary

New Mexico House of Representatives 29th District Republican primary election, 2022
Party	Candidate	Votes	%
Republican	Gregory Cunningham	1,386	66.25%
Republican	Adelious De Stith	706	33.75%
Total votes		2,092	100%

General election

New Mexico House of Representatives 29th District general election, 2022
Party	Candidate	Votes	%
Democratic	Joy Garratt (incumbent)	7,349	53.23%
Republican	Gregory Cunningham	6,458	46.77%
Total votes		13,807	100%
Democratic hold			

=== District 30 ===
Incumbent Democrat Natalie Figueroa had represented the 30th district since 2019.

New Mexico House of Representatives 30th District general election, 2022
Party	Candidate	Votes	%
Democratic	Natalie Figueroa (incumbent)	6,737	54.87%
Republican	Kurstin Johnson	5,541	45.13%
Total votes		12,278	100%
Democratic hold			

=== District 31 ===
Incumbent Republican Bill Rehm had represented the 31st district since 2007.

New Mexico House of Representatives 31st District general election, 2022
Party	Candidate	Votes	%
Republican	Bill Rehm (incumbent)	8,542	54.93%
Democratic	Athena Ann Christodoulou	7,008	45.07%
Total votes		15,550	100%
Republican hold			

=== District 32 ===
Incumbent Democrat Candie Sweetser had represented the 32nd district since 2017. Sweetser lost re-election to Republican Jenifer Jones.

New Mexico House of Representatives 32nd District general election, 2022
Party	Candidate	Votes	%
Republican	Jenifer Jones	3,789	50.31%
Democratic	Candie Sweetser (incumbent)	3,743	49.69%
Total votes		7,532	100%
Republican gain from Democratic			

=== District 33 ===
Incumbent Democrat Micaela Lara Cadena had represented the 33rd district since 2019. Republican primary

New Mexico House of Representatives 33rd District Republican primary election, 2022
Party	Candidate	Votes	%
Republican	Charles Richard Wendler (write-in)	52	100%
Total votes		52	100%

General election

New Mexico House of Representatives 33rd District general election, 2022
Party	Candidate	Votes	%
Democratic	Micaela Lara Cadena (incumbent)	4,908	59.99%
Republican	Charles Richard Wendler	3,273	40.01%
Total votes		8,181	100%
Democratic hold			

=== District 34 ===
Incumbent Democrat Raymundo Lara had represented the 34th district since 2019.

New Mexico House of Representatives 34th District general election, 2022
Party	Candidate	Votes	%
Democratic	Raymundo Lara (incumbent)	3,604	95.70%
Republican	Mark W. Vieth (write-in)	162	4.30%
Total votes		3,766	100%
Democratic hold			

=== District 35 ===
Incumbent Democrat Angelica Rubio had represented the 35th district since 2017.

New Mexico House of Representatives 35th District general election, 2022
Party	Candidate	Votes	%
Democratic	Angelica Rubio (incumbent)	4,879	59.37%
Republican	Richelle Peugh-Swafford	3,339	40.63%
Total votes		8,218	100%
Democratic hold			

=== District 36 ===
Incumbent Democrat Nathan Small had represented the 36th district since 2017.

New Mexico House of Representatives 36th District general election, 2022
Party	Candidate	Votes	%
Democratic	Nathan Small (incumbent)	5,098	52.08%
Republican	Kimberly Skaggs	4,690	47.92%
Total votes		9,788	100%
Democratic hold			

=== District 37 ===
Incumbent Democrat Joanne Ferrary had represented the 37th district since 2017.

New Mexico House of Representatives 37th District general election, 2022
Party	Candidate	Votes	%
Democratic	Joanne Ferrary (incumbent)	5,557	57.25%
Republican	Rene Ezequiel Rodriguez	4,150	42.75%
Total votes		9,707	100%
Democratic hold			

=== District 38 ===
Incumbent Republican Rebecca Dow had represented the 38th district since 2017. Dow was retiring to run for governor of New Mexico. The district had been drawn to be much more Democratic-leaning than its predecessor. Tara Jaramillo defeated Ravi Bhasker for the Democratic nomination. Sandra Kay Hammack defeated Melba Aguilar for the Republican nomination. Jaramillo won the general election. Democratic primary

New Mexico House of Representatives 38th District Democratic primary election, 2022
Party	Candidate	Votes	%
Democratic	Tara Jaramillo	1,232	64.60%
Democratic	Ravi Bhasker	675	35.40%
Total votes		1,907	100%

Republican primary

New Mexico House of Representatives 38th District Republican primary election, 2022
Party	Candidate	Votes	%
Republican	Sandra Kay Hammack	1,339	74.31%
Republican	Melba Aguilar	463	25.69%
Total votes		1,802	100%

General election

New Mexico House of Representatives 38th District general election, 2022
Party	Candidate	Votes	%
Democratic	Tara Jaramillo	4,500	50.69%
Republican	Sandra Kay Hammack	4,377	49.31%
Total votes		8,877	100%
Democratic gain from Republican			

=== District 39 ===
Incumbent Republican Luis Terrazas had represented the 39th district since 2021. Former representative Rodolpho Martinez defeated Karen Whitlock for the Democratic nomination. Democratic primary

New Mexico House of Representatives 39th District Democratic primary election, 2022
Party	Candidate	Votes	%
Democratic	Rodolpho Martinez	1,770	51.27%
Democratic	Karen Whitlock	1,682	48.73%
Total votes		3,452	100%

General election

New Mexico House of Representatives 39th District general election, 2022
Party	Candidate	Votes	%
Republican	Luis Terrazas (incumbent)	6,415	53.29%
Democratic	Rodolpho Martinez	5,622	46.71%
Total votes		12,037	100%
Republican hold			

=== District 40 ===
Incumbent Democrat Roger Montoya had represented the 40th district since 2021. Montoya lost re-nomination to Joseph Sanchez, who went on to win the general election. Democratic primary

New Mexico House of Representatives 40th District Democratic primary election, 2022
Party	Candidate	Votes	%
Democratic	Joseph Sanchez	2,761	57.10%
Democratic	Roger Montoya (incumbent)	2,074	42.90%
Total votes		4,835	100%

General election

New Mexico House of Representatives 40th District general election, 2022
Party	Candidate	Votes	%
Democratic	Joseph Sanchez	7,342	72.77%
Republican	Jerald Steve McFall	2,747	27.23%
Total votes		10,089	100%
Democratic hold			

=== District 41 ===
Incumbent Democrat Susan Herrera had represented the 41st district since 2019. Marlo Martinez unsuccessfully challenged Herrera for the Democratic nomination. Democratic primary

New Mexico House of Representatives 41st District Democratic primary election, 2022
Party	Candidate	Votes	%
Democratic	Susan Herrera (incumbent)	2,658	58.53%
Democratic	Marlo Martinez	1,883	41.47%
Total votes		4,541	100%

General election

New Mexico House of Representatives 41st District general election, 2022
Party	Candidate	Votes	%
Democratic	Susan Herrera (incumbent)	7,521	100%
Total votes		7,521	100%
Democratic hold			

=== District 42 ===
Incumbent Democrat Kristina Ortez had represented the 42nd district since 2021. Florence Miera unsuccessfully challenged Ortez for the Democratic nomination. Democratic primary

New Mexico House of Representatives 42nd District Democratic primary election, 2022
Party	Candidate	Votes	%
Democratic	Kristina Ortez (incumbent)	2,855	60.04%
Democratic	Florence Miera	1,900	39.96%
Total votes		4,755	100%

General election

New Mexico House of Representatives 42nd District general election, 2022
Party	Candidate	Votes	%
Democratic	Kristina Ortez (incumbent)	9,267	100%
Total votes		9,267	100%
Democratic hold			

=== District 43 ===
Incumbent Democrat Christine Chandler had represented the 43rd district since 2019.

New Mexico House of Representatives 43rd District general election, 2022
Party	Candidate	Votes	%
Democratic	Christine Chandler (incumbent)	9,173	100%
Total votes		9,173	100%
Democratic hold			

=== District 44 ===
The new 44th district includes the home of incumbent Republican Jane Powdrell-Culbert, who had represented the 44th district since 2003, and incumbent Democrat Daymon Ely, who had represented the 23rd district since 2017. Ely did not seek re-election. Frida Susana Vazquez unsuccessfully challenged Powdrell-Culbert for the Republican nomination. Powdrell-Culbert lost the general election to Democrat Kathleen Cates. Republican primary

New Mexico House of Representatives 44th District Republican primary election, 2022
Party	Candidate	Votes	%
Republican	Jane Powdrell-Culbert (incumbent)	1,461	61.88%
Republican	Frida Susana Vasquez	900	38.12%
Total votes		2,361	100%

General election

New Mexico House of Representatives 44th District general election, 2022
Party	Candidate	Votes	%
Democratic	Kathleen Cates	7,415	51.02%
Republican	Jane Powdrell-Culbert (incumbent)	7,118	48.98%
Total votes		14,533	100%
Democratic gain from Republican			

=== District 45 ===
Incumbent Democrat Linda Serrato had represented the 45th district since 2020.

New Mexico House of Representatives 45th District general election, 2022
Party	Candidate	Votes	%
Democratic	Linda Serrato (incumbent)	9,124	100%
Total votes		9,124	100%
Democratic hold			

=== District 46 ===
Incumbent Democrat Andrea Romero had represented the 46th district since 2019. Henry Roybal and Ryan Erik Salazar unsuccessfully challenged Romero for the Democratic nomination. Democratic primary

New Mexico House of Representatives 46th District Democratic primary election, 2022
Party	Candidate	Votes	%
Democratic	Andrea Romero (incumbent)	3,151	61.58%
Democratic	Henry Roybal	1,704	33.30%
Democratic	Ryan Erik Salazar	262	5.12%
Total votes		5,117	100%

General election

New Mexico House of Representatives 46th District general election, 2022
Party	Candidate	Votes	%
Democratic	Andrea Romero (incumbent)	10,921	77.32%
Republican	Jay Groseclose	3,203	22.68%
Total votes		14,124	100%
Democratic hold			

=== District 47 ===
Incumbent Democratic House Speaker Brian Egolf had represented the 47th district since 2009. Egolf did not seek re-election.

New Mexico House of Representatives 47th District general election, 2022
Party	Candidate	Votes	%
Democratic	Reena Szczepanski	14,538	100%
Total votes		14,538	100%
Democratic hold			

=== District 48 ===
Incumbent Democrat Tara Lujan had represented the 48th district since 2020.

New Mexico House of Representatives 48th District general election, 2022
Party	Candidate	Votes	%
Democratic	Tara Lujan (incumbent)	9,251	100%
Total votes		9,251	100%
Democratic hold			

=== District 49 ===
Incumbent Republican Gail Armstrong had represented the 49th district since 2017.

New Mexico House of Representatives 49th District general election, 2022
Party	Candidate	Votes	%
Republican	Gail Armstrong (incumbent)	8,774	100%
Total votes		8,774	100%
Republican hold			

=== District 50 ===
Incumbent Democrat Matthew McQueen had represented the 50th district since 2015.

New Mexico House of Representatives 50th District general election, 2022
Party	Candidate	Votes	%
Democratic	Matthew McQueen (incumbent)	11,986	100%
Total votes		11,986	100%
Democratic hold			

=== District 51 ===
Incumbent Republican Rachel Black had represented the 51st district since 2019. Black lost re-nomination to fellow Republican John Block, who went on to win the general election. Republican primary

New Mexico House of Representatives 51st District Republican primary election, 2022
Party	Candidate	Votes	%
Republican	John Block	1,545	50.81%
Republican	Rachel Black (incumbent)	1,496	49.19%
Total votes		3,041	100%

General election

New Mexico House of Representatives 51st District general election, 2022
Party	Candidate	Votes	%
Republican	John Block	5,856	63.04%
Democratic	Sharonlee Cummins	3,434	36.96%
Total votes		9,290	100%
Republican hold			

=== District 52 ===
Incumbent Democrat Doreen Gallegos had represented the 52nd district since 2013.

New Mexico House of Representatives 52nd District general election, 2022
Party	Candidate	Votes	%
Democratic	Doreen Gallegos (incumbent)	4,208	60.88%
Republican	John Foreman	2,704	39.12%
Total votes		6,912	100%
Democratic hold			

=== District 53 ===
Incumbent Democrat Willie Madrid had represented the 53rd district since 2019.

New Mexico House of Representatives 53rd District general election, 2022
Party	Candidate	Votes	%
Democratic	Willie Madrid (incumbent)	3,238	51.05%
Republican	Elizabeth Lee Winterrowd	3,105	48.95%
Total votes		6,343	100%
Democratic hold			

=== District 54 ===
Incumbent Republican Minority Leader Jim Townsend had represented the 54th district since 2015.

New Mexico House of Representatives 54th District general election, 2022
Party	Candidate	Votes	%
Republican	Jim Townsend (incumbent)	7,038	100%
Total votes		7,038	100%
Republican hold			

=== District 55 ===
Incumbent Republican Cathrynn Brown had represented the 55th district since 2011.

New Mexico House of Representatives 55th District general election, 2022
Party	Candidate	Votes	%
Republican	Cathrynn Brown (incumbent)	7,428	100%
Total votes		7,428	100%
Republican hold			

=== District 56 ===
Incumbent Republican Zachary Cook had represented the 56th district since 2009. Cook did not seek re-election.

New Mexico House of Representatives 56th District general election, 2022
Party	Candidate	Votes	%
Republican	Harlan Vincent	7,761	67.17%
Independent	Elaine Allen	3,793	32.83%
Total votes		11,554	100%
Republican hold			

=== District 57 ===
Incumbent Republican Jason Harper had represented the 57th district since 2013.

New Mexico House of Representatives 57th District general election, 2022
Party	Candidate	Votes	%
Republican	Jason Harper (incumbent)	6,082	51.82%
Democratic	Michelle Eleanor Sandoval	5,654	48.18%
Total votes		11,736	100%
Republican hold			

=== District 58 ===
Incumbent Republican Candy Ezzell had represented the 58th district since 2005.

New Mexico House of Representatives 58th District general election, 2022
Party	Candidate	Votes	%
Republican	Candy Ezzell (incumbent)	4,100	100%
Total votes		4,100	100%
Republican hold			

=== District 59 ===
Incumbent Republican Greg Nibert had represented the 59th district since 2017.

New Mexico House of Representatives 59th District general election, 2022
Party	Candidate	Votes	%
Republican	Greg Nibert (incumbent)	7,667	100%
Total votes		7,667	100%
Republican hold			

=== District 60 ===
Incumbent Republican Joshua Hernandez had represented the 60th district since 2021.

New Mexico House of Representatives 60th District general election, 2022
Party	Candidate	Votes	%
Republican	Joshua Hernandez (incumbent)	7,359	100%
Total votes		7,359	100%
Republican hold			

=== District 61 ===
Incumbent Republican Randall Pettigrew had represented the 61st district since 2021. Rebecca Jill Jones unsuccessfully challenged Pettigrew for the Republican nomination. Republican primary

New Mexico House of Representatives 61st District Republican primary election, 2022
Party	Candidate	Votes	%
Republican	Randall Pettigrew (incumbent)	635	64.08%
Republican	Rebecca Jill Jones	356	35.92%
Total votes		991	100%

General election

New Mexico House of Representatives 61st District general election, 2022
Party	Candidate	Votes	%
Republican	Randall Pettigrew (incumbent)	3,090	100%
Total votes		3,090	100%
Republican hold			

=== District 62 ===
Incumbent Republican Larry Scott had represented the 62nd district since 2015. Elaine Sena Cortez unsuccessfully challenged Scott for the Republican nomination. Republican primary

New Mexico House of Representatives 62nd District Republican primary election, 2022
Party	Candidate	Votes	%
Republican	Larry Scott (incumbent)	1,694	63.92%
Republican	Elaine Sena Cortez	956	36.08%
Total votes		2,650	100%

General election

New Mexico House of Representatives 62nd District general election, 2022
Party	Candidate	Votes	%
Republican	Larry Scott (incumbent)	6,484	100%
Total votes		6,484	100%
Republican hold			

=== District 63 ===
Incumbent Republican Martin Zamora had represented the 63rd district since 2019.

New Mexico House of Representatives 63rd District general election, 2022
Party	Candidate	Votes	%
Republican	Martin Zamora (incumbent)	4,787	100%
Total votes		4,787	100%
Republican hold			

=== District 64 ===
Incumbent Republican Randal Crowder had represented the 64th district since 2015. Crowder did not seek re-election.

New Mexico House of Representatives 64th District general election, 2022
Party	Candidate	Votes	%
Republican	Andrea Reeb	5,889	67.34%
Independent	David Lansford	2,856	32.66%
Total votes		8,745	100%
Republican hold			

=== District 65 ===
Incumbent Democrat Derrick Lente had represented the 65th district since 2017.

New Mexico House of Representatives 65th District general election, 2022
Party	Candidate	Votes	%
Democratic	Derrick Lente (incumbent)	6,230	100%
Total votes		6,230	100%
Democratic hold			

=== District 66 ===
Incumbent Independent Phelps Anderson had represented the 66th district since 2019. Anderson did not seek re-election.

New Mexico House of Representatives 66th District general election, 2022
Party	Candidate	Votes	%
Republican	Jimmy Mason	5,571	80.86%
Libertarian	Andrew Kennedy	1,319	19.14%
Total votes		6,890	100%
Republican gain from Independent			

=== District 67 ===
Incumbent Republican Jackey Chatfield had represented the 68th district since 2019.

New Mexico House of Representatives 67th District general election, 2022
Party	Candidate	Votes	%
Republican	Jackey Chatfield (incumbent)	8,455	100%
Total votes		8,455	100%
Republican hold			

=== District 68 ===
Incumbent Democrat Karen Bash had represented the 68th district since 2019. Bash did not seek re-election.

New Mexico House of Representatives 68th District general election, 2022
Party	Candidate	Votes	%
Democratic	Charlotte Little	5,651	50.16%
Republican	Robert Henry Moss	5,616	49.84%
Total votes		11,267	100%
Democratic hold			

=== District 69 ===
Incumbent Democrat Harry Garcia had represented the district since 2016. Democratic primary

New Mexico House of Representatives th District Democratic primary election, 2022
Party	Candidate	Votes	%
Democratic	Harry Garcia (incumbent)	1,159	80.54%
Democratic	Martin Anthony Trujillo (write-in)	280	19.46%
Total votes		1,439	100%

General election

New Mexico House of Representatives 69th District general election, 2022
Party	Candidate	Votes	%
Democratic	Harry Garcia (incumbent)	5,075	100%
Total votes		5,075	100%
Democratic hold			

=== District 70 ===
Incumbent Democrat Ambrose Castellano had represented the 70th district since 2021. Anita Amalia Gonzales unsuccessfully challenged Castellano for the Democratic nomination. Democratic primary

New Mexico House of Representatives 70th District Democratic primary election, 2022
Party	Candidate	Votes	%
Democratic	Ambrose Castellano (incumbent)	2,061	50.96%
Democratic	Anita Amalia Gonzales	1,983	49.04%
Total votes		4,044	100%

General election

New Mexico House of Representatives 70th District general election, 2022
Party	Candidate	Votes	%
Democratic	Ambrose Castellano (incumbent)	7,237	100%
Total votes		7,237	100%
Democratic hold			
