= 2020 New Mexico House of Representatives election =

- November 3, 2020

All 70 seats in the New Mexico House of Representatives 36 seats needed for a majority

	Majority party	Minority party
Leader	Brian Egolf	Jim Townsend
Party	Democratic	Republican
Leader's seat	47th - Santa Fe	54th - Artesia
Last election	46 seats, 58.4%	24 seats, 39.2%
Seats before	46	24
Seats won	44	25
Seat change	▼2	▲1
Popular vote	438,465	392,345
Percentage	51.7%	46.3%
Swing	▼6.7%	▲7.1%
- Results: Democratic hold Republican hold Republican gain Independent gain
Speaker of the House before election
Brian Egolf
Democratic
Elected Speaker of the House
Brian Egolf
Democratic

The 2020 New Mexico House of Representatives election took place on November 3, 2020, as part of the biennial United States elections. All the seats in the New Mexico House of Representatives were up for election. The previous election was held in 2018.

Primary elections were held on June 3, alongside the 2020 New Mexico Democratic presidential primary.

== Results ==
District	Incumbent	Party	Elected representative	Party
1	Rod Montoya	Rep	Rod Montoya (Note: Unopposed in the November general election.)	Rep
2	James Strickler	Rep	James Strickler	Rep
3	Paul Bandy	Rep	Ryan Lane	Rep
4	Anthony Allison	Dem	Anthony Allison	Dem
5	Doreen Wonda Johnson	Dem	Doreen Wonda Johnson	Dem
6	Eliseo Alcon	Dem	Eliseo Alcon	Dem
7	Kelly Fajardo	Rep	Kelly Fajardo	Rep
8	Alonzo Baldonado	Rep	Alonzo Baldonado	Rep
9	Patricia Lundstrom	Dem	Patricia Lundstrom	Dem
10	Andrés Romero	Dem	Andrés Romero	Dem
11	Javier Martínez	Dem	Javier Martínez	Dem
12	Art De La Cruz	Dem	Brittney Barreras	Ind
13	Patricia Roybal Caballero	Dem	Patricia Roybal Caballero	Dem
14	Miguel Garcia	Dem	Miguel Garcia	Dem
15	Dayan Hochman-Vigil	Dem	Dayan Hochman-Vigil	Dem
16	Moe Maestas	Dem	Moe Maestas	Dem
17	Deborah Armstrong	Dem	Deborah Armstrong	Dem
18	Gail Chasey	Dem	Gail Chasey	Dem
19	Sheryl Williams Stapleton	Dem	Sheryl Williams Stapleton	Dem
20	Abbas Akhil	Dem	Meredith Dixon	Dem
21	Debra Sariñana	Dem	Debra Sariñana	Dem
22	Gregg Schmedes	Rep	Stefani Lord	Rep
23	Daymon Ely	Dem	Daymon Ely	Dem
24	Liz Thomson	Dem	Liz Thomson	Dem
25	Christine Trujillo	Dem	Christine Trujillo	Dem
26	Georgene Louis	Dem	Georgene Louis	Dem
27	Marian Matthews	Dem	Marian Matthews	Dem
28	Melanie Stansbury	Dem	Melanie Stansbury	Dem
29	Joy Garratt	Dem	Joy Garratt	Dem
30	Natalie Figueroa	Dem	Natalie Figueroa	Dem
31	Bill Rehm	Rep	Bill Rehm	Rep
32	Candie Sweetser	Dem	Candie Sweetser	Dem
33	Micaela Lara Cadena	Dem	Micaela Lara Cadena	Dem
34	Raymundo Lara	Dem	Raymundo Lara	Dem
35	Angelica Rubio	Dem	Angelica Rubio	Dem
36	Nathan Small	Dem	Nathan Small	Dem
37	Joanne Ferrary	Dem	Joanne Ferrary	Dem
38	Rebecca Dow	Rep	Rebecca Dow	Rep
39	Rodolpho Martinez	Dem	Luis Terrazas	Rep
40	Joseph Sanchez	Dem	Roger Montoya	Dem
41	Susan Herrera	Dem	Susan Herrera	Dem
42	Daniel R. Barrone	Dem	Kristina Ortez	Dem
43	Christine Chandler	Dem	Christine Chandler	Dem
44	Jane Powdrell-Culbert	Rep	Jane Powdrell-Culbert	Rep
45	Linda Serrato	Dem	Linda Serrato	Dem
46	Andrea Romero	Dem	Andrea Romero	Dem
47	Brian Egolf	Dem	Brian Egolf	Dem
48	Tara Lujan	Dem	Tara Lujan	Dem
49	Gail Armstrong	Rep	Gail Armstrong	Rep
50	Matthew McQueen	Dem	Matthew McQueen	Dem
51	Rachel Black	Rep	Rachel Black	Rep
52	Doreen Gallegos	Dem	Doreen Gallegos	Dem
53	Willie Madrid	Dem	Willie Madrid	Dem
54	Jim Townsend	Rep	Jim Townsend	Rep
55	Cathrynn Brown	Rep	Cathrynn Brown	Rep
56	Zachary Cook	Rep	Zachary Cook	Rep
57	Jason Harper	Rep	Jason Harper	Rep
58	Candy Ezzell	Rep	Candy Ezzell	Rep
59	Greg Nibert	Rep	Greg Nibert	Rep
60	Tim Lewis	Rep	Joshua Hernandez	Rep
61	David Gallegos	Rep	Randall Pettigrew	Rep
62	Larry Scott	Rep	Larry Scott	Rep
63	Martin Zamora	Rep	Martin Zamora	Rep
64	Randal Crowder	Rep	Randal Crowder	Rep
65	Derrick Lente	Dem	Derrick Lente	Dem
66	Phelps Anderson	Rep	Phelps Anderson	Rep
67	Jackey Chatfield	Rep	Jackey Chatfield	Rep
68	Karen Bash	Dem	Karen Bash	Dem
69	Harry Garcia	Dem	Harry Garcia	Dem
70	Tomás Salazar	Dem	Ambrose Castellano	Dem

=== Closest races ===
Seats where the margin of victory was under 10%:

1. District 53, 0.6%
2. District 27, 2.1%
3. District 22, 2.4%
4. District 57, 4.4%
5. District 68, 5%
6. District 39, 5.6% gain
7. District 20, 7%
8. District 37, 7.2%
9. District 44, 7.4%
10. District 36, 8%
11. District 50, 8.3%
12. District 31, 8.5%
13. District 4, 8.6%
14. District 32, 8.6%
15. District 29, 8.8%
16. District 23, 9.6%
17. District 28, 9.8%

== Retiring incumbents ==
Eleven incumbent representatives (seven Democrats and four Republicans) did not seek reelection.

1. Abbas Akhil (D), District 20
2. Paul Bandy (R), District 3
3. Daniel R. Barrone (D), District 42
4. David Gallegos (R), District 61
5. Tim Lewis (R), District 60
6. Patricio Ruiloba (D), District 12 (sought reelection but was disqualified from the ballot; subsequently resigned on September 9, 2020)
7. Tomás Salazar (D), District 70
8. Joespeh Sanchez (D), District 40
9. Gregg Schmedes (D), District 22
10. Jim Trujillo (D), District 45 (subsequently resigned on September 29, 2020)
11. Linda Trujillo (D), District 48 (subsequently resigned on July 9, 2020)

== Defeated incumbents ==
=== In primary ===
No incumbent representative was defeated in the primary.

=== In general election ===
One incumbent (a Democrat) was defeated in the general election.

1. Art De La Cruz (D), District 12

== Predictions ==
Source	Ranking	As of
The Cook Political Report	Safe D	October 21, 2020

== Detailed results ==
=== District 1 ===
1st District general election, 2020
Party	Candidate	Votes	%
Republican	Rod Montoya (incumbent)	11,324	100.0
Total votes		11,324	100.0
Republican hold			

=== District 2 ===
2nd District general election, 2020
Party	Candidate	Votes	%
Republican	James Strickler (incumbent)	7,831	100.0
Total votes		7,831	100.0
Republican hold			

=== District 3 ===
3rd District general election, 2020
Party	Candidate	Votes	%
Republican	Ryan Lane	9,113	100.0
Total votes		9,113	100.0
Republican hold			

=== District 4 ===
4th District general election, 2020
Party	Candidate	Votes	%
Democratic	Anthony Allison (incumbent)	5,991	54.3
Republican	Mark Duncan	5,048	45.7
Total votes		11,039	100.0
Democratic hold			

=== District 5 ===
5th District general election, 2020
Party	Candidate	Votes	%
Democratic	Doreen Wonda Johnson (incumbent)	9,090	100.0
Total votes		9,090	100.0
Democratic hold			

=== District 6 ===
6th District general election, 2020
Party	Candidate	Votes	%
Democratic	Eliseo Alcon (incumbent)	6,390	59.4
Republican	Karen Chavez	4,368	40.6
Total votes		10,758	100.0
Democratic hold			

=== District 7 ===
7th District general election, 2020
Party	Candidate	Votes	%
Republican	Kelly Fajardo (incumbent)	6,219	59.2
Democratic	Santos Griego	4,288	40.8
Total votes		10,507	100.0
Republican hold			

=== District 8 ===
8th District general election, 2020
Party	Candidate	Votes	%
Republican	Alonzo Baldonado (incumbent)	8,863	63.4
Democratic	Mary Jo Jaramillo	5,111	36.6
Total votes		13,974	100.0
Republican hold			

=== District 9 ===
9th District general election, 2020
Party	Candidate	Votes	%
Democratic	Patricia Lundstrom (incumbent)	7,578	100.0
Total votes		7,578	100.0
Democratic hold			

=== District 10 ===
10th District general election, 2020
Party	Candidate	Votes	%
Democratic	Andrés Romero (incumbent)	5,621	62.0
Republican	Dinah Vargas	3,441	38.0
Total votes		9,062	100.0
Democratic hold			

=== District 11 ===
Republican primary

11th District Republican primary
Party	Candidate	Votes	%
Republican	Adrian Trujillo Sr.	621	63.9
Republican	Stella Padilla	351	36.1
Total votes		972	100.0

General election

11th District general election, 2020
Party	Candidate	Votes	%
Democratic	Javier Martínez (incumbent)	11,216	77.6
Republican	Adrian Trujillo Sr.	3,241	22.4
Total votes		14,557	100.0
Democratic hold			

=== District 12 ===
Incumbent Democrat Patricio Ruiloba was disqualified from the primary ballot on March 31, 2020, for submitting incomplete information on his election paperwork. Subsequently, Ruiloba resigned effective September 9 in order to run for Bernalillo County Sheriff. Former Bernalillo County Commissioner Art De La Cruz was appointed to the vacant seat, but because the Democratic Party did not have a valid nominee to replace him on the ballot, De La Cruz was forced to run for election to a full term as a write-in candidate.

12th District general election, 2020
Party	Candidate	Votes	%
Independent	Brittney Barreras	4,183	73.8
Democratic	Art De La Cruz (incumbent) (write-in)	1,482	26.2
Total votes		5,665	100.0
Independent gain from Democratic			

=== District 13 ===
Democratic primary

13th District Democratic primary
Party	Candidate	Votes	%
Democratic	Patricia Roybal Caballero (incumbent)	1,391	66.1
Democratic	Edwina Cisneros	714	33.9
Total votes		2,105	100.0

General election

13th District general election, 2020
Party	Candidate	Votes	%
Democratic	Patricia Roybal Caballero (incumbent)	6,147	66.3
Republican	Kayla Marshall	3,119	33.7
Total votes		9,266	100.0
Democratic hold			

=== District 14 ===
Democratic primary

14th District Democratic primary
Party	Candidate	Votes	%
Democratic	Miguel Garcia (incumbent)	1,722	57.3
Democratic	Robert Chavez	1,285	42.7
Total votes		3,007	100.0

General election

14th District general election, 2020
Party	Candidate	Votes	%
Democratic	Miguel Garcia (incumbent)	6,835	100.0
Total votes		6,835	100.0
Democratic hold			

=== District 15 ===
15th District general election, 2020
Party	Candidate	Votes	%
Democratic	Dayan Hochman-Vigil (incumbent)	8,903	55.4
Republican	Ali Ennenga	6,531	40.6
Libertarian	Ranota Banks	645	4.0
Total votes		16,079	100.0
Democratic hold			

=== District 16 ===
16th District general election, 2020
Party	Candidate	Votes	%
Democratic	Moe Maestas (incumbent)	8,670	63.4
Republican	Antoinette Taft	5,003	36.6
Total votes		13,673	100.0
Democratic hold			

=== District 17 ===
Democratic primary

17th District Democratic primary
Party	Candidate	Votes	%
Democratic	Deborah Armstrong (incumbent)	2,913	65.5
Democratic	Laura e Lucero y Ruiz de Gutierrez	1,534	34.5
Total votes		4,447	100.0

General election

17th District general election, 2020
Party	Candidate	Votes	%
Democratic	Deborah Armstrong (incumbent)	8,767	63.4
Republican	Kimberly Kaehr-McMillan	4,383	31.7
Libertarian	Scott Goodman	669	4.8
Total votes		13,819	100.0
Democratic hold			

=== District 18 ===
18th District general election, 2020
Party	Candidate	Votes	%
Democratic	Gail Chasey (incumbent)	10,709	100.0
Total votes		10,709	100.0
Democratic hold			

=== District 19 ===
19th District general election, 2020
Party	Candidate	Votes	%
Democratic	Sheryl Williams Stapleton (incumbent)	8,922	73.9
Republican	Stephen Cecco	2,480	20.4
Libertarian	Mark Curtis	663	5.5
Total votes		12,065	100.0
Democratic hold			

=== District 20 ===
Democratic primary

20th District Democratic primary
Party	Candidate	Votes	%
Democratic	Meredith Dixon	2,247	65.7
Democratic	Ilena Estrella	1,175	34.3
Total votes		3,422	100.0

General election

20th District general election, 2020
Party	Candidate	Votes	%
Democratic	Meredith Dixon	8,015	53.5
Republican	Michael Hendricks	6,961	46.5
Total votes		14,976	100.0
Democratic hold			

=== District 21 ===
21st District general election, 2020
Party	Candidate	Votes	%
Democratic	Debra Sariñana (incumbent)	4,950	69.8
Libertarian	Paul McKenney	2,142	30.2
Total votes		7,092	100.0
Democratic hold			

=== District 22 ===
22nd District general election, 2020
Party	Candidate	Votes	%
Republican	Stefani Lord	10,030	51.2
Democratic	Jessica Velasquez	9,808	48.8
Total votes		20,108	100.0
Republican hold			

=== District 23 ===
Republican primary

23rd District Republican primary
Party	Candidate	Votes	%
Republican	Ellis McMath	1,838	68.0
Republican	Audrey Mendonca-Trujillo	931	32.0
Total votes		2,701	100.0

General election

23rd District general election, 2020
Party	Candidate	Votes	%
Democratic	Daymon Ely (incumbent)	8,987	54.8
Republican	Ellis McMath	7,402	45.2
Total votes		16,389	100.0
Democratic hold			

=== District 24 ===
24th District general election, 2020
Party	Candidate	Votes	%
Democratic	Liz Thomson (incumbent)	8,627	59.0
Republican	Amy Smith	6,000	41.0
Total votes		14,627	100.0
Democratic hold			

=== District 25 ===
25th District general election, 2020
Party	Candidate	Votes	%
Democratic	Christine Trujillo (incumbent)	9,007	60.6
Republican	Sarah Rich-Jackson	4,542	30.6
Green	Stephen Verchinski	765	5.2
Libertarian	Jocelynn Paden	540	3.6
Total votes		14,854	100.0
Democratic hold			

=== District 26 ===
26th District general election, 2020
Party	Candidate	Votes	%
Democratic	Georgene Louis (incumbent)	5,797	100.0
Total votes		5,797	100.0
Democratic hold			

=== District 27 ===
Incumbent Democrat Bill Pratt died on December 29, 2019. The Bernalillo County Commission appointed Marian Matthews to the vacant seat on January 9, 2020. Democratic primary

27th District Democratic primary
Party	Candidate	Votes	%
Democratic	Marian Matthews (incumbent)	2,845	60.2
Democratic	William Orr	1,280	39.8
Total votes		4,125	100.0

Republican primary

27th District Republican primary
Party	Candidate	Votes	%
Republican	Robert Godshall	2,046	53.6
Republican	Jill Michel	1,774	46.4
Total votes		3,820	100.0

General election

27th District general election, 2020
Party	Candidate	Votes	%
Democratic	Marian Matthews (incumbent)	8,818	51.0
Republican	Robert Godshall	8,460	48.9
Independent	Jason Morris Barker (write-in)	21	0.1
Total votes		17,299	100.0
Democratic hold			

=== District 28 ===
28th District general election, 2020
Party	Candidate	Votes	%
Democratic	Melanie Stansbury (incumbent)	8,908	52.6
Republican	Thomas Stull	7,252	42.8
Libertarian	Robert Vaillancourt	780	4.6
Total votes		16,940	100.0
Democratic hold			

=== District 29 ===
29th District general election, 2020
Party	Candidate	Votes	%
Democratic	Joy Garratt (incumbent)	10,890	54.4
Republican	Adelious de Stith	9,135	45.6
Total votes		20,025	100.0
Democratic hold			

=== District 30 ===
30th District general election, 2020
Party	Candidate	Votes	%
Democratic	Natalie Figueroa (incumbent)	8,320	56.8
Republican	John Jones	5,788	39.5
Libertarian	Randall Sobien	548	3.7
Total votes		14,656	100.0
Democratic hold			

=== District 31 ===
31st District general election, 2020
Party	Candidate	Votes	%
Republican	Bill Rehm (incumbent)	10,796	52.8
Democratic	Julie Brenning	9,042	44.3
Libertarian	Steven Penhall	588	2.9
Total votes		20,426	100.0
Republican hold			

=== District 32 ===
32nd District general election, 2020
Party	Candidate	Votes	%
Democratic	Candie Sweetser (incumbent)	5,260	54.3
Republican	J. Scott Chandler	4,432	45.7
Total votes		9,692	100.0
Democratic hold			

=== District 33 ===
33rd District general election, 2020
Party	Candidate	Votes	%
Democratic	Micaela Lara Cadena (incumbent)	6,910	62.4
Republican	Beth Miller	4,165	37.6
Total votes		11,075	100.0
Democratic hold			

=== District 34 ===
Democratic primary

34th District Democratic primary
Party	Candidate	Votes	%
Democratic	Raymundo Lara (incumbent)	925	61.3
Democratic	Belaquin "Bill" Gomez	583	38.7
Total votes		1,508	100.0

General election

34th District general election, 2020
Party	Candidate	Votes	%
Democratic	Raymundo Lara (incumbent)	6,179	65.9
Republican	Dawn Ladd	3,201	34.1
Total votes		9,380	100.0
Democratic hold			

=== District 35 ===
35th District general election, 2020
Party	Candidate	Votes	%
Democratic	Angelica Rubio (incumbent)	7,019	61.0
Republican	Richelle Ponder	4,481	39.0
Total votes		11,500	100.0
Democratic hold			

=== District 36 ===
36th District general election, 2020
Party	Candidate	Votes	%
Democratic	Nathan Small (incumbent)	6,627	54.0
Republican	Brandi Polanco	5,644	46.0
Total votes		12,271	100.0
Democratic hold			

=== District 37 ===
37th District general election, 2020
Party	Candidate	Votes	%
Democratic	Joanne Ferrary (incumbent)	9,353	53.6
Republican	Bev Courtney	8,093	46.4
Total votes		17,446	100.0
Democratic hold			

=== District 38 ===
38th District general election, 2020
Party	Candidate	Votes	%
Republican	Rebecca Dow (incumbent)	8,547	56.5
Democratic	Karen Whitlock	6,147	40.6
Libertarian	William Kinney	431	2.9
Total votes		15,125	100.0
Republican hold			

=== District 39 ===
39th District general election, 2020
Party	Candidate	Votes	%
Republican	Luis Terrazas	5,967	52.8
Democratic	Rodolpho Martinez (incumbent)	5,341	47.2
Total votes		11,308	100.0
Republican gain from Democratic			

=== District 40 ===
Democratic primary

40th District Democratic primary
Party	Candidate	Votes	%
Democratic	Roger Montoya	3,784	59.6
Democratic	Matthew Gonzales	2,569	40.4
Total votes		6,353	100.0

General election

40th District general election, 2020
Party	Candidate	Votes	%
Democratic	Roger Montoya	7,378	56.9
Republican	Justin Salazar-Torres	5,589	43.1
Total votes		12,967	100.0
Democratic hold			

=== District 41 ===
41st District general election, 2020
Party	Candidate	Votes	%
Democratic	Susan Herrera (incumbent)	9,572	100.0
Total votes		9,572	100.0
Democratic hold			

=== District 42 ===
Democratic incumbent Roberto Gonzales was appointed to a vacant State Senate seat on December 20, 2019. Taos Mayor Daniel R. Barrone was appointed to succeed Gonzales on January 4, 2020. In April 2020, Barrone announced he would not seek a full term as Representative. Democratic primary

42nd District Democratic primary
Party	Candidate	Votes	%
Democratic	Kristina Ortez	4,498	60.4
Democratic	Mark Gallegos	2,954	39.6
Total votes		7,452	100.0

Republican primary

42nd District Republican primary
Party	Candidate	Votes	%
Republican	Linda Calhoun	539	54.2
Republican	Paul Martinez	456	45.8
Total votes		995	100.0

General election

42nd District general election, 2020
Party	Candidate	Votes	%
Democratic	Kristina Ortez	10,721	74.2
Republican	Linda Calhoun	3,723	25.8
Total votes		14,444	100.0
Democratic hold			

=== District 43 ===
43rd District general election, 2020
Party	Candidate	Votes	%
Democratic	Christine Chandler (incumbent)	10,057	61.6
Republican	David Hampton	6,268	38.4
Total votes		16,325	100.0
Democratic hold			

=== District 44 ===
44th District general election, 2020
Party	Candidate	Votes	%
Republican	Jane Powdrell-Culbert (incumbent)	10,460	51.8
Democratic	Gary Tripp	8,961	44.4
Libertarian	Jeremy Myers	763	3.8
Total votes		20,184	100.0
Republican hold			

=== District 45 ===
Democratic primary

45th District Democratic primary
Party	Candidate	Votes	%
Democratic	Linda Serrato	2,087	33.2
Democratic	Lisa Martinez	1,486	23.6
Democratic	Pat Varela	1,446	23.0
Democratic	Carmichael Dominguez	973	15.5
Democratic	Yolanda Sena	297	4.7
Total votes		6,289	100.0

General election

45th District general election, 2020
Party	Candidate	Votes	%
Democratic	Linda Serrato	11,297	82.8
Libertarian	Helen Milenski	2,339	17.2
Total votes		13,636	100.0
Democratic hold			

=== District 46 ===
46th District general election, 2020
Party	Candidate	Votes	%
Democratic	Andrea Romero (incumbent)	12,585	77.1
Republican	Jay Groseclose	2,734	22.9
Total votes		16,328	100.0
Democratic hold			

=== District 47 ===
47th District general election, 2020
Party	Candidate	Votes	%
Democratic	Brian Egolf (incumbent)	16,187	80.6
Republican	Raye Byford	3,897	19.4
Total votes		20,084	100.0
Democratic hold			

=== District 48 ===
Incumbent Democrat Linda Trujillo resigned on July 9, 2020, after winning the Democratic primary unopposed. Democrat Tara Lujan was appointed to succeed Trujillo on July 23.

48th District general election, 2020
Party	Candidate	Votes	%
Democratic	Tara Lujan (incumbent)	12,520	100.0
Total votes		12,520	100.0
Democratic hold			

=== District 49 ===
49th District general election, 2020
Party	Candidate	Votes	%
Republican	Gail Armstrong (incumbent)	9,203	100.0
Total votes		9,203	100.0
Republican hold			

=== District 50 ===
Democratic primary

50th District Democratic primary
Party	Candidate	Votes	%
Democratic	Matthew McQueen (incumbent)	4,164	75.3
Democratic	Becky King Spindle	1,366	24.7
Total votes		5,530	100.0

General election

50th District general election, 2020
Party	Candidate	Votes	%
Democratic	Matthew McQueen (incumbent)	8,702	52.2
Republican	Christina Estrada	7,321	43.9
Libertarian	Jerry Gage	599	3.6
Total votes		16,662	100.0
Democratic hold			

=== District 51 ===
51st District general election, 2020
Party	Candidate	Votes	%
Republican	Rachel Black (incumbent)	7,632	65.3
Democratic	Jeff Swanson	4,057	24.7
Total votes		11,689	100.0
Republican hold			

=== District 52 ===
52nd District general election, 2020
Party	Candidate	Votes	%
Democratic	Doreen Gallegos (incumbent)	5,794	65.1
Republican	John Foreman	3,106	34.9
Total votes		8,900	100.0
Democratic hold			

=== District 53 ===
53rd District general election, 2020
Party	Candidate	Votes	%
Democratic	Willie Madrid (incumbent)	3,364	50.3
Republican	Ricky Little	3,328	49.7
Total votes		6,692	100.0
Democratic hold			

=== District 54 ===
54th District general election, 2020
Party	Candidate	Votes	%
Republican	Jim Townsend (incumbent)	9,691	100.0
Total votes		9,691	100.0
Republican hold			

=== District 55 ===
55th District general election, 2020
Party	Candidate	Votes	%
Republican	Cathrynn Brown (incumbent)	11,031	100.0
Total votes		11,031	100.0
Republican hold			

=== District 56 ===
56th District general election, 2020
Party	Candidate	Votes	%
Republican	Zachary Cook (incumbent)	7,586	66.7
Democratic	Laura Childress	3,793	33.3
Total votes		11,379	100.0
Republican hold			

=== District 57 ===
57th District general election, 2020
Party	Candidate	Votes	%
Republican	Jason Harper (incumbent)	8,220	52.2
Democratic	Billie Ann Helean	7,536	47.8
Total votes		15,756	100.0
Republican hold			

=== District 58 ===
58th District general election, 2020
Party	Candidate	Votes	%
Republican	Candy Ezzell (incumbent)	5,304	100.0
Total votes		5,304	100.0
Republican hold			

=== District 59 ===
59th District general election, 2020
Party	Candidate	Votes	%
Republican	Greg Nibert (incumbent)	10,127	73.4
Democratic	Kimble Kearns	3,666	26.6
Total votes		13,793	100.0
Republican hold			

=== District 60 ===
60th District general election, 2020
Party	Candidate	Votes	%
Republican	Joshua Hernandez	11,504	100.0
Total votes		11,504	100.0
Republican hold			

=== District 61 ===
Republican primary

61st District Republican primary
Party	Candidate	Votes	%
Republican	Randall Pettigrew	1,183	59.7
Republican	David Snider	797	40.3
Total votes		1,980	100.0

General election

61st District general election, 2020
Party	Candidate	Votes	%
Republican	Randall Pettigrew	5,072	100.0
Total votes		5,072	100.0
Republican hold			

=== District 62 ===
62nd District general election, 2020
Party	Candidate	Votes	%
Republican	Larry Scott (incumbent)	9,391	100.0
Total votes		9,391	100.0
Republican hold			

=== District 63 ===
63rd District general election, 2020
Party	Candidate	Votes	%
Republican	Martin Zamora (incumbent)	4,689	58.7
Democratic	Randal Brown	3,294	41.3
Total votes		7,983	100.0
Republican hold			

=== District 64 ===
64th District general election, 2020
Party	Candidate	Votes	%
Republican	Randal Crowder (incumbent)	8,732	100.0
Total votes		8,732	100.0
Republican hold			

=== District 65 ===
Democratic primary

65th District Democratic primary
Party	Candidate	Votes	%
Democratic	Derrick Lente (incumbent)	2,386	68.7
Democratic	James Madalena	1,088	31.3
Total votes		3,474	100.0

General election

65th District general election, 2020
Party	Candidate	Votes	%
Democratic	Derrick Lente (incumbent)	7,691	76.8
Republican	Phillip Salazar	2,320	23.2
Total votes		10,011	100.0
Democratic hold			

=== District 66 ===
66th District general election, 2020
Party	Candidate	Votes	%
Republican	Phelps Anderson (incumbent)	9,246	100.0
Total votes		9,246	100.0
Republican hold			

=== District 67 ===
67th District general election, 2020
Party	Candidate	Votes	%
Republican	Jackey Chatfield (incumbent)	9,233	100.0
Total votes		9,233	100.0
Republican hold			

=== District 68 ===
68th District general election, 2020
Party	Candidate	Votes	%
Democratic	Karen Bash (incumbent)	8,515	52.5
Republican	Giovanni Coppola	7,696	47.5
Total votes		16,211	100.0
Democratic hold			

=== District 69 ===
69th District general election, 2020
Party	Candidate	Votes	%
Democratic	Harry Garcia (incumbent)	5,819	63.5
Republican	Roy Ryan	3,339	36.5
Total votes		9,158	100.0
Democratic hold			

=== District 70 ===
Democratic primary

70th District Democratic primary
Party	Candidate	Votes	%
Democratic	Ambrose Castellano	2,291	41.0
Democratic	Anita Gonzales	2,229	39.9
Democratic	Robert Anaya	1,071	19.1
Total votes		5,591	100.0

General election

70th District general election, 2020
Party	Candidate	Votes	%
Democratic	Ambrose Castellano	7,231	64.1
Republican	Nathan Dial	4,044	35.9
Total votes		11,275	100.0
Democratic hold			

== See also ==
- 2020 New Mexico elections
