= 2018 New Mexico House of Representatives election =

- November 6, 2018

All 70 seats in the New Mexico House of Representatives 36 seats needed for a majority

	Majority party	Minority party
Leader	Brian Egolf	Nate Gentry (retired)
Party	Democratic	Republican
Leader's seat	47th - Santa Fe	30th - Albuquerque
Last election	38	32
Seats before	39	31
Seats won	46	24
Seat change	▲7	▼7
Popular vote	364,291	244,576
Percentage	58.40%	39.21%
Swing	▲4.25%	▼5.95%
- Results: Democratic hold Democratic gain Republican hold Republican gain
Speaker of the House before election
Brian Egolf
Democratic
Elected Speaker of the House
Brian Egolf
Democratic

The 2018 New Mexico House of Representatives election took place as part of the biennial United States elections. New Mexico voters elected state representatives in all 70 of the state house's districts. State representatives serve two-year terms in the New Mexico House of Representatives.

A primary election on June 5, 2018, determined which candidates appeared on the November 6 general election ballot. Primary election results can be obtained from the New Mexico Secretary of State's website.

In the 2016 state House elections, Democrats flipped five seats from Republican hands and took control of the House by increasing their seats from 33 to 38. This put Democrats in effective control of the New Mexico House of Representatives.

To claim control of the chamber from Democrats, the Republicans needed to net four House seats. However, in the elections, the Democrats made a net gain of eight seats, increasing their seats from 38 to 46.

== Results ==
District	Incumbent	Party	Elected representative	Party
1st	Rod Montoya	Rep	Rod Montoya	Rep
2nd	James Strickler	Rep	James Strickler	Rep
3rd	Paul Bandy	Rep	Paul Bandy	Rep
4th	Sharon Clahchischilliage	Rep	Anthony Allison	Dem
5th	Doreen Wonda Johnson	Dem	Doreen Wonda Johnson	Dem
6th	Eliseo Alcon	Dem	Eliseo Alcon	Dem
7th	Kelly Fajardo	Rep	Kelly Fajardo	Rep
8th	Alonzo Baldonado	Rep	Alonzo Baldonado	Rep
9th	Patricia Lundstrom	Dem	Patricia Lundstrom	Dem
10th	Andrés Romero	Dem	Andrés Romero	Dem
11th	Javier Martínez	Dem	Javier Martínez	Dem
12th	Patricio Ruiloba	Dem	Patricio Ruiloba	Dem
13th	Patricia Roybal Caballero	Dem	Patricia Roybal Caballero	Dem
14th	Miguel Garcia	Dem	Miguel Garcia	Dem
15th	Sarah Maestas Barnes	Rep	Dayan Hochman-Vigil	Dem
16th	Moe Maestas	Dem	Moe Maestas	Dem
17th	Deborah Armstrong	Dem	Deborah Armstrong	Dem
18th	Gail Chasey	Dem	Gail Chasey	Dem
19th	Sheryl Williams Stapleton	Dem	Sheryl Williams Stapleton	Dem
20th	Jim Dines	Rep	Abbas Akhil	Dem
21st	Debra Sariñana	Dem	Debra Sariñana	Dem
22nd	Gregg Schmedes	Rep	Gregg Schmedes	Rep
23rd	Daymon Ely	Dem	Daymon Ely	Dem
24th	Liz Thomson	Dem	Liz Thomson	Dem
25th	Christine Trujillo	Dem	Christine Trujillo	Dem
26th	Georgene Louis	Dem	Georgene Louis	Dem
27th	Larry Larrañaga	Rep	William Pratt	Dem
28th	Jimmie Hall	Rep	Melanie Stansbury	Dem
29th	David Adkins	Rep	Joy Garratt	Dem
30th	Nate Gentry	Rep	Natalie Figueroa	Dem
31st	Bill Rehm	Rep	Bill Rehm	Rep
32nd	Candie Sweetser	Dem	Candie Sweetser	Dem
33rd	Bill McCamley	Dem	Micaela Lara Cadena	Dem
34th	Bealquin "Bill" Gomez	Dem	Raymundo Lara	Dem
35th	Angelica Rubio	Dem	Angelica Rubio	Dem
36th	Nathan Small	Dem	Nathan Small	Dem
37th	Joanne Ferrary	Dem	Joanne Ferrary	Dem
38th	Rebecca Dow	Rep	Rebecca Dow	Rep
39th	Rodolpho Martinez	Dem	Rodolpho Martinez	Dem
40th	Nick Salazar	Dem	Joseph Sanchez	Dem
41st	Debbie Rodella	Dem	Susan Herrera	Dem
42nd	Roberto Gonzales	Dem	Roberto Gonzales	Dem
43rd	Stephanie Garcia Richard	Dem	Christine Chandler	Dem
44th	Jane Powdrell-Culbert	Rep	Jane Powdrell-Culbert	Rep
45th	Jim Trujillo	Dem	Jim Trujillo	Dem
46th	Carl Trujillo	Dem	Andrea Romero	Dem
47th	Brian Egolf	Dem	Brian Egolf	Dem
48th	Linda Trujillo	Dem	Linda Trujillo	Dem
49th	Gail Armstrong	Rep	Gail Armstrong	Rep
50th	Matthew McQueen	Dem	Matthew McQueen	Dem
51st	Yvette Herrell	Rep	Rachel Black	Rep
52nd	Doreen Gallegos	Dem	Doreen Gallegos	Dem
53rd	Ricky Little	Rep	Willie Madrid	Dem
54th	Jim Townsend	Rep	Jim Townsend	Rep
55th	Cathrynn Brown	Rep	Cathrynn Brown	Rep
56th	Zachary Cook	Rep	Zachary Cook	Rep
57th	Jason Harper	Rep	Jason Harper	Rep
58th	Candy Ezzell	Rep	Candy Ezzell	Rep
59th	Greg Nibert	Rep	Greg Nibert	Rep
60th	Tim Lewis	Rep	Tim Lewis	Rep
61st	David Gallegos	Rep	David Gallegos	Rep
62nd	Larry Scott	Rep	Larry Scott	Rep
63rd	George Dodge Jr.	Dem	Martin Zamora	Rep
64th	Randal Crowder	Rep	Randal Crowder	Rep
65th	Derrick Lente	Dem	Derrick Lente	Dem
66th	Bob Wooley	Rep	Phelps Anderson	Rep
67th	Dennis Roch	Rep	Jackey Chatfield	Rep
68th	Monica Youngblood	Rep	Karen Bash	Dem
69th	Harry Garcia	Dem	Harry Garcia	Dem
70th	Tomás Salazar	Dem	Tomás Salazar	Dem

== Retiring incumbents ==
10 incumbent representatives (7 Republicans, 3 Democrats) chose to not seek reelection.

- Sarah Maestas Barnes (R), District 15
- Larry Larrañaga (R), District 27
- Nate Gentry (R), District 30
- Bill McCamley (D), District 33
- Nick Salazar (D), District 40
- Stephanie Garcia Richard (D), District 43 (running for Public Lands Commissioner)
- Yvette Herrell (R), District 51 (running for Congress)
- Bob Wooley (R), District 66
- Dennis Roch (R), District 67

== Defeated incumbents ==
=== In primary ===
- Bealquin "Bill" Gomez (D), District 34
- Debbie Rodella (D), District 41
- Carl Trujillo (D), District 46

=== In general election ===
- Sharon Clahchischilliage (R), District 4
- Jimmie Hall (R), District 28
- David Adkins (R), District 29
- Ricky Little (R), District 53
- Monica Youngblood (R), District 68

== Predictions ==
Source	Ranking	As of
Governing	Safe D	October 8, 2018

== Detailed results ==
=== District 1 ===
1st District general election, 2018
Party	Candidate	Votes	%
Republican	Rod Montoya (incumbent)	8,512	100.0
Total votes		8,512	100.0
Republican hold			

=== District 2 ===
2nd District general election, 2018
Party	Candidate	Votes	%
Republican	James Strickler (incumbent)	5,437	100.0
Total votes		5,437	100.0
Republican hold			

=== District 3 ===
3rd District general election, 2018
Party	Candidate	Votes	%
Republican	Paul Bandy (incumbent)	6,225	77.4
Democratic	Mary Schildmeyer	1,817	22.6
Total votes		8,042	100.0
Republican hold			

=== District 4 ===
4th District general election, 2018
Party	Candidate	Votes	%
Democratic	Anthony Allison	4,111	52.2
Republican	Sharon Clahchischilliage (incumbent)	3,766	47.8
Total votes		7,877	100.0
Democratic gain from Republican			

=== District 5 ===
5th District general election, 2018
Party	Candidate	Votes	%
Democratic	Doreen Wonda Johnson (incumbent)	6,467	100.0
Total votes		6,467	100.0
Democratic hold			

=== District 6 ===
6th District general election, 2018
Party	Candidate	Votes	%
Democratic	Eliseo Alcon (incumbent)	5,872	100.0
Total votes		5,872	100.0
Democratic hold			

=== District 7 ===
7th District general election, 2018
Party	Candidate	Votes	%
Republican	Kelly Fajardo (incumbent)	4,294	54.6
Democratic	Leroy Baca	3,576	45.4
Total votes		7,870	100.0
Republican hold			

=== District 8 ===
8th District general election, 2018
Party	Candidate	Votes	%
Republican	Alonzo Baldonado (incumbent)	6,398	59.7
Democratic	Mary Jo Jaramillo	3,576	40.3
Total votes		10,719	100.0
Republican hold			

=== District 9 ===
9th District general election, 2018
Party	Candidate	Votes	%
Democratic	Patricia Lundstrom (incumbent)	5,324	100.0
Total votes		5,324	100.0
Democratic hold			

=== District 10 ===
10th District general election, 2018
Party	Candidate	Votes	%
Democratic	Andrés Romero (incumbent)	4,913	100.0
Total votes		4,913	100.0
Democratic hold			

=== District 11 ===
11th District general election, 2018
Party	Candidate	Votes	%
Democratic	Javier Martinez (incumbent)	9,801	100.0
Total votes		9,801	100.0
Democratic hold			

=== District 12 ===
12th District general election, 2018
Party	Candidate	Votes	%
Democratic	Patricio Ruiloba (incumbent)	4,288	100.0
Total votes		4,288	100.0
Democratic hold			

=== District 13 ===
Democratic primary

District 13 Democratic primary
Party	Candidate	Votes	%
Democratic	Patricia Roybal Caballero (incumbent)	631	44.85
Democratic	Robert R. Atencio	472	33.55
Democratic	Damion Cruzz	304	21.61
Total votes		1,407	100.0

General election

13th District general election, 2018
Party	Candidate	Votes	%
Democratic	Patricia Roybal Caballero (incumbent)	4,708	100.0
Total votes		4,708	100.0
Democratic hold			

=== District 14 ===
14th District general election, 2018
Party	Candidate	Votes	%
Democratic	Miguel Garcia (incumbent)	5,253	100.0
Total votes		5,253	100.0
Democratic hold			

=== District 15 ===
15th District general election, 2018
Party	Candidate	Votes	%
Democratic	Dayan Hochman-Vigil	6,565	52.1
Republican	Brad Winter	6,025	47.9
Total votes		12,590	100.0
Democratic gain from Republican			

=== District 16 ===
16th District general election, 2018
Party	Candidate	Votes	%
Democratic	Moe Maestas (incumbent)	6,774	100.0
Total votes		6,774	100.0
Democratic hold			

=== District 17 ===
17th District general election, 2018
Party	Candidate	Votes	%
Democratic	Deborah Armstrong (incumbent)	7,007	64.9
Republican	Ray Gallegos	3,783	35.1
Total votes		10,790	100.0
Democratic hold			

=== District 18 ===
18th District general election, 2018
Party	Candidate	Votes	%
Democratic	Gail Chasey (incumbent)	9,668	100.0
Total votes		9,668	100.0
Democratic hold			

=== District 19 ===
19th District general election, 2018
Party	Candidate	Votes	%
Democratic	Sheryl Williams Stapleton (incumbent)	7,937	100.0
Total votes		7,937	100.0
Democratic hold			

=== District 20 ===
20th District general election, 2018
Party	Candidate	Votes	%
Democratic	Abbas Akhil (Note: The Democratic nomnination was initially won by Dathan Weems. After winning the primary election, Weems withdrew and was replaced by the state Democratic Party with Abbas Akhil for the general election.)	5,889	50.5
Republican	Jim Dines (incumbent)	5,780	49.5
Total votes		11,669	100.0
Democratic gain from Republican			

=== District 21 ===
21st District general election, 2018
Party	Candidate	Votes	%
Democratic	Debra Sariñana (incumbent)	4,075	100.0
Total votes		4,075	100.0
Democratic hold			

=== District 22 ===
Republican primary

District 22 Republican primary
Party	Candidate	Votes	%
Republican	Gregg Schmedes	1,726	74.01
Republican	Merritt Hamilton Allen	606	25.99
Total votes		2,332	100.0

22nd District general election, 2018
Party	Candidate	Votes	%
Republican	Gregg Schmedes (incumbent) (Note: After winning the primary election, Schmedes was appointed to fill the vacated seat; therefore, he ran as the incumbent in the general election, but was not an incumbent during the primary.)	8,192	50.4
Democratic	Jessica Velasquez	8,054	49.6
Total votes		16,246	100.0
Republican hold			

=== District 23 ===
23rd District general election, 2018
Party	Candidate	Votes	%
Democratic	Daymon Ely (incumbent)	7,278	57.1
Republican	Brenda Diane Boatman	5,462	42.9
Total votes		12,740	100.0
Democratic hold			

=== District 24 ===
Republican primary

District 24 Republican primary
Party	Candidate	Votes	%
Republican	Trey Stephen Morris	811	64.83
Republican	Michael Joseph Meyer	440	35.17
Total votes		1,251	100.0

24th District general election, 2018
Party	Candidate	Votes	%
Democratic	Liz Thomson (incumbent)	6,730	58.0
Republican	Trey Stephen Morris	4,871	42.0
Total votes		11,601	100.0
Democratic hold			

=== District 25 ===
25th District general election, 2018
Party	Candidate	Votes	%
Democratic	Christine Trujillo (incumbent)	8,076	68.92
Republican	Joan Antoinette Marentes	3,642	31.08
Total votes		11,718	100.0
Democratic hold			

=== District 26 ===
26th District general election, 2018
Party	Candidate	Votes	%
Democratic	Georgene Louis (incumbent)	3,971	100.0
Total votes		3,971	100.0
Democratic hold			

=== District 27 ===
Democratic primary

District 27 Democratic primary
Party	Candidate	Votes	%
Democratic	William Pratt	1,181	50.4
Democratic	Nicholas Martin	1,163	49.6
Total votes		2,344	100.0

General election

27th District general election, 2018
Party	Candidate	Votes	%
Democratic	William Pratt	7,190	50.7
Republican	Robert S. Godshall (Note: The Republican nomination was originally won by incumbent Republican Larry Larrañaga. After winning the primary, Larrañaga withdrew and the state Republican Party chose Robert S. Godshall as his replacement for the general election.)	7,004	49.3
Total votes		14,194	100.0
Democratic gain from Republican			

=== District 28 ===
28th District general election, 2018
Party	Candidate	Votes	%
Democratic	Melanie Stansbury	7,331	53.7
Republican	Jimmie Hall (incumbent)	6,322	46.3
Total votes		13,653	100.0
Democratic gain from Republican			

=== District 29 ===
29th District general election, 2018
Party	Candidate	Votes	%
Democratic	Joy Garratt	7,065	53.9
Republican	David Adkins (incumbent)	6,046	46.1
Total votes		13,111	100.0
Democratic gain from Republican			

=== District 30 ===
30th District general election, 2018
Party	Candidate	Votes	%
Democratic	Natalie Figueroa	6,766	58.02
Republican	John Jones	4,895	41.98
Total votes		11,661	100.0
Democratic gain from Republican			

=== District 31 ===
Republican primary

District 31 Republican primary
Party	Candidate	Votes	%
Republican	Bill Rehm (incumbent)	1,509	84.0
Republican	Mark Boslough	288	16.0
Total votes		1,797	100.0

General election

31st District general election, 2018
Party	Candidate	Votes	%
Republican	Bill Rehm (incumbent)	9,669	64.3
Libertarian	William Wiley	5,371	35.7
Total votes		15,040	100.0
Republican hold			

=== District 32 ===
32nd District general election, 2018
Party	Candidate	Votes	%
Democratic	Candie Sweetser (incumbent)	4,845	64.0
Republican	Laura Boyd	2,721	36.0
Total votes		7,566	100.0
Democratic hold			

=== District 33 ===
Democratic primary

District 33 Democratic primary
Party	Candidate	Votes	%
Democratic	Micaela Lara Cadena	1,171	53.7
Democratic	Mary Martinez White	553	25.4
Democratic	Guenevere Ruth McMahon	455	20.9
Total votes		2,179	100.0

General election

33rd District general election, 2018
Party	Candidate	Votes	%
Democratic	Micaela Lara Cadena	5,781	65.4
Republican	Charles Wendler	3,061	34.6
Total votes		8,842	100.0
Democratic hold			

=== District 34 ===
Democratic primary

District 34 Democratic primary
Party	Candidate	Votes	%
Democratic	Raymundo Lara	592	51.2
Democratic	Bealquin "Bill" Gomez (incumbent)	564	48.8
Total votes		1,156	100.0

General election

34th District general election, 2018
Party	Candidate	Votes	%
Democratic	Raymundo Lara	4,635	100.0
Total votes		4,635	100.0
Democratic hold			

=== District 35 ===
35th District general election, 2018
Party	Candidate	Votes	%
Democratic	Angelica Rubio (incumbent)	5,778	64.6
Republican	Jonathan Kyle Allen	3,159	35.4
Total votes		8,937	100.0
Democratic hold			

=== District 36 ===
36th District general election, 2018
Party	Candidate	Votes	%
Democratic	Nathan Small (incumbent)	5,262	60.45
Republican	David Tofsted	3,442	39.55
Total votes		8,704	100.0
Democratic hold			

=== District 37 ===
37th District general election, 2018
Party	Candidate	Votes	%
Democratic	Joanne Ferrary (incumbent)	7,741	59.7
Republican	Bev Courtney	5,219	40.3
Total votes		12,960	100.0
Democratic hold			

=== District 38 ===
38th District general election, 2018
Party	Candidate	Votes	%
Republican	Rebecca Dow (incumbent)	6,634	54.3
Democratic	Karen Whitlock	5,593	45.7
Total votes		12,227	100.0
Republican hold			

=== District 39 ===
39th District general election, 2018
Party	Candidate	Votes	%
Democratic	Rodolpho Martinez (incumbent)	5,282	58.1
Republican	Lee Cotter	3,812	41.9
Total votes		9,094	100.0
Democratic hold			

=== District 40 ===
Democratic primary

District 40 Democratic primary
Party	Candidate	Votes	%
Democratic	Joseph Sanchez	3,056	47.7
Democratic	Paula Garcia	1,951	30.5
Democratic	Barney Trujillo	1,394	21.8
Total votes		6,401	100.0

General election

40th District general election, 2018
Party	Candidate	Votes	%
Democratic	Joseph Sanchez	8,277	80.7
Independent	Tweeti Blancett (Note: Running with party affiliation as "decline-to-state")	1,973	19.3
Total votes		10,250	100.0
Democratic hold			

=== District 41 ===
Democratic primary

District 41 Democratic primary
Party	Candidate	Votes	%
Democratic	Susan Herrera	3,119	56.3
Democratic	Debbie Rodella (incumbent)	2,426	43.7
Total votes		5,545	100.0

41st District general election, 2018
Party	Candidate	Votes	%
Democratic	Susan Herrera	7,939	100.0
Total votes		7,939	100.0
Democratic hold			

=== District 42 ===
42nd District general election, 2018
Party	Candidate	Votes	%
Democratic	Roberto Gonzales (incumbent)	10,437	100.0
Total votes		10,437	100.0
Democratic hold			

=== District 43 ===
Democratic primary

District 43 Democratic primary
Party	Candidate	Votes	%
Democratic	Christine Chandler	1,949	54.8
Democratic	Peter Sheehey	1,607	45.2
Total votes		3,556	100.0

General election

43rd District general election, 2018
Party	Candidate	Votes	%
Democratic	Christine Chandler	8,311	62.1
Republican	Lisa Shin	5,076	37.9
Total votes		13,387	100.0
Democratic hold			

=== District 44 ===
44th District general election, 2018
Party	Candidate	Votes	%
Republican	Jane Powdrell-Culbert (incumbent)	8,116	54.7
Democratic	Benton Howell	6,712	45.3
Total votes		14,828	100.0
Republican hold			

=== District 45 ===
45th District general election, 2018
Party	Candidate	Votes	%
Democratic	Jim Trujillo (incumbent)	9,590	100.0
Total votes		9,590	100.0
Democratic hold			

=== District 46 ===
Democratic primary

District 46 Democratic primary
Party	Candidate	Votes	%
Democratic	Andrea Romero	3,076	52.7
Democratic	Carl Trujillo (incumbent)	2,763	47.3
Total votes		5,839	100.0

General election

46th District general election, 2018
Party	Candidate	Votes	%
Democratic	Andrea Romero	8,624	75.9
Democratic	Heather Nordquist (Note: Qualified as a write-in candidate.)	2,734	24.07
Total votes		11,358	100.0
Democratic hold			

=== District 47 ===
47th District general election, 2018
Party	Candidate	Votes	%
Democratic	Brian Egolf (incumbent)	14,482	100.0
Total votes		14,482	100.0
Democratic hold			

=== District 48 ===
48th District general election, 2018
Party	Candidate	Votes	%
Democratic	Linda Trujillo (incumbent)	10,759	100.0
Total votes		10,759	100.0
Democratic hold			

=== District 49 ===
49th District general election, 2018
Party	Candidate	Votes	%
Republican	Gail Armstrong (incumbent)	7,498	100.0
Total votes		7,498	100.0
Republican hold			

=== District 50 ===
50th District general election, 2018
Party	Candidate	Votes	%
Democratic	Matthew McQueen (incumbent)	7,490	58.9
Independent	Jarratt Applewhite	5,222	41.1
Total votes		12,712	100.0
Democratic hold			

=== District 51 ===
51st District general election, 2018
Party	Candidate	Votes	%
Republican	Rachel Black	5,486	64.3
Democratic	Jeff Swanson	3,045	35.7
Total votes		8,531	100.0
Republican hold			

=== District 52 ===
Democratic primary

District 52 Democratic primary
Party	Candidate	Votes	%
Democratic	Doreen Gallegos (incumbent)	1,061	79.0
Democratic	Jaime Gonzalez-Castillo	282	21.0
Total votes		1,343	100.0

General election

52nd District general election, 2018
Party	Candidate	Votes	%
Democratic	Doreen Gallegos (incumbent)	4,553	66.5
Republican	David Cheek	2,293	33.5
Total votes		6,486	100.0
Democratic hold			

=== District 53 ===
Democratic primary

District 53 Democratic primary
Party	Candidate	Votes	%
Democratic	Willie Madrid	314	66.2
Democratic	Javier Gonzalez	160	33.8
Total votes		474	100.0

General election

53rd District general election, 2018
Party	Candidate	Votes	%
Democratic	Willie Madrid	2,425	53.2
Republican	Ricky Little (incumbent)	2,134	46.8
Total votes		4,559	100.0
Democratic gain from Republican			

=== District 54 ===
54th District general election, 2018
Party	Candidate	Votes	%
Republican	Jim Townsend (incumbent)	6,773	100.0
Total votes		6,773	100.0
Republican hold			

=== District 55 ===
55th District general election, 2018
Party	Candidate	Votes	%
Republican	Cathrynn Brown (incumbent)	7,755	100.0
Total votes		7,755	100.0
Republican hold			

=== District 56 ===
56th District general election, 2018
Party	Candidate	Votes	%
Republican	Zachary Cook (incumbent)	6,646	100.0
Total votes		6,646	100.0
Republican hold			

=== District 57 ===
57th District general election, 2018
Party	Candidate	Votes	%
Republican	Jason Harper (incumbent)	5,250	51.1
Democratic	Billie Ann Helean	5,033	48.9
Total votes		10,283	100.0
Republican hold			

=== District 58 ===
58th District general election, 2018
Party	Candidate	Votes	%
Republican	Candy Ezzell (incumbent)	3,857	100.0
Total votes		3,857	100.0
Republican hold			

=== District 59 ===
59th District general election, 2018
Party	Candidate	Votes	%
Republican	Greg Nibert (incumbent)	7,862	76.8
Libertarian	Carl Swinney	2,376	23.2
Total votes		10,238	100.0
Republican hold			

=== District 60 ===
60th District general election, 2018
Party	Candidate	Votes	%
Republican	Tim Lewis (incumbent)	6,124	52.8
Democratic	Alexis Jimenez	5,468	47.2
Total votes		11,592	100.0
Republican hold			

=== District 61 ===
61st District general election, 2018
Party	Candidate	Votes	%
Republican	David Gallegos (incumbent)	3,530	100.0
Total votes		3,530	100.0
Republican hold			

=== District 62 ===
62nd District general election, 2018
Party	Candidate	Votes	%
Republican	Larry Scott (incumbent)	6,561	100.0
Total votes		6,561	100.0
Republican hold			

=== District 63 ===
63rd District general election, 2018
Party	Candidate	Votes	%
Republican	Martin Zamora	2,982	50.2
Democratic	George Dodge Jr. (incumbent)	2,955	49.8
Total votes		5,937	100.0
Republican gain from Democratic			

=== District 64 ===
64th District general election, 2018
Party	Candidate	Votes	%
Republican	Randal Crowder (incumbent)	5,687	100.0
Total votes		5,687	100.0
Republican hold			

=== District 65 ===
65th District general election, 2018
Party	Candidate	Votes	%
Democratic	Derrick Lente (incumbent)	6,359	100.0
Total votes		6,359	100.0
Democratic hold			

=== District 66 ===
66th District general election, 2018
Party	Candidate	Votes	%
Republican	Phelps Anderson (incumbent)	6,802	100.0
Total votes		6,802	100.0
Republican hold			

=== District 67 ===
67th District general election, 2018
Party	Candidate	Votes	%
Republican	Jackey Chatfield	5,842	62.2
Democratic	Mark McDonald	3,549	37.8
Total votes		9,391	100.0
Republican hold			

=== District 68 ===
68th District general election, 2018
Party	Candidate	Votes	%
Democratic	Karen Bash	6,857	58.0
Republican	Monica Youngblood (incumbent)	4,972	42.0
Total votes		11,829	100.0
Democratic gain from Republican			

=== District 69 ===
69th District general election, 2018
Party	Candidate	Votes	%
Democratic	Harry Garcia (incumbent)	5,720	100.0
Total votes		5,720	100.0
Democratic hold			

=== District 70 ===
70th District general election, 2018
Party	Candidate	Votes	%
Democratic	Tomás Salazar (incumbent)	6,927	100.0
Total votes		6,927	100.0
Democratic hold			

== See also ==
- United States elections, 2018
- United States Senate election in New Mexico, 2018
- United States House of Representatives elections in New Mexico, 2018
- New Mexico elections, 2018
- New Mexico gubernatorial election, 2018
- Elections in New Mexico
