= Jessica Velasquez =

Chair of the New Mexico Democratic Party
- Incumbent
- Assumed office April 24, 2021
- Preceded by: Marg Elliston

Personal details
- Born: 1976 or 1977 (age 49–50)
- Party: Democratic
- Spouse: Aaron
- Children: 3
- Education: Pennsylvania State University (BA); University of New Mexico (MA)

Jessica Velasquez (born 1976 or 1977), is an American politician serving as the chair of the Democratic Party of New Mexico.

== Early life ==
Velasquez grew up in a “tiny farm community north of Pittsburgh on what was left of the family farm.” She earned a bachelor's degree from Pennsylvania State University and left Pennsylvania in 1999 to teach in New Mexico.

== Career ==
Velasquez ran in the 2018 New Mexico House of Representatives election, but lost to incumbent Republican Gregg Schmedes. She ran again in the 2020 New Mexico House of Representatives election, but lost to Stefani Lord. She has also served in Governor Michelle Lujan Grisham's Interim Education Committee. She has retired from teaching and now runs an electroplating business with her husband Aaron.

Party political offices
Preceded by Marg Elliston	Chair of the New Mexico Democratic Party; 2021–present	Incumbent
