= David Adkins =

David Adkins may refer to:

- David E. Adkins, New Mexico state legislator
- David Adkins (Kansas politician) (born 1961), Kansas state legislator
- Sinbad (comedian) (born David Adkins, 1956), American comedian
- David Adkins (West Virginia politician) (born 1961), West Virginia state legislator
