= Southwest Public Policy Institute =

American-based think tank

- Formation: June 17, 2022; 4 years ago
- Type: Nonprofit think tank
- Chairwoman: Tonja Brandt
- Vice Chairman: Zachary Fort
- President and CEO: Patrick M. Brenner
- Board of directors: Tim Eichenberg, Dain Ehring, Joshua Young
- Budget: Revenue: $238,810; Expenses: $210,447 (FYE December 2025)
- Website: www.southwestpolicy.com

Southwest Public Policy Institute (SPPI) is a conservative free-market nonprofit think tank based in the American Southwest. The institute conducts research on consumer finance, government transparency, and economic policy, with an emphasis on data-driven analysis and regulatory impacts. SPPI positions itself as a consumer advocate for financial inclusivity and open government.

SPPI has become known for its use of public-records litigation in New Mexico and other Southwestern states. The institute has filed multiple lawsuits under the Inspection of Public Records Act (IPRA), including a successful 2025 case against the New Mexico Taxation and Revenue Department involving access to vehicle-registration data related to the state’s electric-vehicle mandate. SPPI has also investigated data breaches at federal agencies and launched campaigns focused on consumer protection and government accountability.

The institute publishes policy reports, surveys, and commentary on topics such as lending, mortgage finance, credit-access platforms, and taxpayer-funded lobbying. Its work has been published and cited in regional and national media outlets including The Wall Street Journal, The Washington Post, Fox Business, American Banker, and the Albuquerque Journal. SPPI also administers the Marianne T. Anderson Memorial Fellowship to support early-career researchers.

== History ==
The Southwest Public Policy Institute was founded by Patrick M. Brenner as a regional think tank. Among the founding board members was James Hallinan, who died in 2023.

In July 2022, SPPI requested details about the Vax 2 the Max program, which offered cash prizes to promote vaccinations, using the Inspection of Public Records Act. Due to a lack of response, SPPI later sued the state for potential act violations.

In 2022, SPPI filed a lawsuit against the New Mexico Department of Taxation and Revenue (NMTRD) for failing to comply with an Inspection of Public Records Act (IPRA) request. The request sought access to vehicle registration data held by the Motor Vehicle Division to evaluate the socioeconomic impact of New Mexico's electric vehicle (EV) mandate. SPPI hypothesized that the policy, which requires an increasing percentage of zero- and low-emission vehicles in the state beginning with model year 2027, would disproportionately burden low-income and minority residents, who are less likely to afford EVs. In 2025, a state district court ruled in SPPI’s favor, ordering NMTRD to release the requested data and pay over $30,000 in legal fees and costs.

In 2023, SPPI launched the "Bureau to Protect Financial Consumers" campaign in response to a Consumer Financial Protection Bureau data breach that exposed personal information of over 250,000 consumers. The campaign aims to aggregate affected consumers' stories to advocate for accountability and enhanced data protection measures at the CFPB.

== Positions ==
=== Financial Inclusivity ===
SPPI advocates for policies that expand financial inclusivity, with a focus on ensuring that consumers, particularly those with limited resources or thin credit histories, have access to transparent and affordable financial products. The institute has argued that long-term, government-subsidized credit structures can unintentionally raise prices and limit mobility for lower-income households. In commentary for The Wall Street Journal, SPPI contended that federally backed, long-duration mortgages distort housing markets by inflating demand and increasing total borrowing costs, which can disproportionately burden first-time buyers and younger households.

SPPI maintains that financial products should be designed to promote wealth-building rather than long-term indebtedness, and that clearer disclosure standards are needed to help consumers understand the cumulative cost of credit. The institute’s broader research emphasizes expanding access to responsible lending, improving transparency, and reducing regulatory barriers that limit consumer choice in credit markets.

SPPI's analysis of mortgage structures and credit-market distortions prompted discussion in national publications. In response to SPPI’s critique of the 30-year mortgage, housing-finance experts offered historical and policy context in related commentary. A letter by Ed Pinto of the American Enterprise Institute argued that long-term, low-down-payment mortgages have historically produced higher default rates for borrowers with weaker credit, particularly during periods of loose monetary policy. Another letter by Bryan Greene of the National Association of Realtors contended that the national housing shortage, rather than the mortgage product itself, is the primary driver of affordability challenges.

=== Education ===
SPPI advocates for school choice and education reform, emphasizing parental empowerment and accountability in public education. SPPI's research highlights widespread dissatisfaction among parents, particularly in Albuquerque Public Schools, where surveys indicate that over 75% of parents would prefer charter school alternatives if accessible. The institute supports legislation to expand school choice, arguing that competition improves educational outcomes and holds underperforming schools accountable.

=== Election Integrity ===
SPPI and its leadership do not endorse claims that the 2020 United States presidential election was fraudulent. The institute has publicly rejected election-denial conspiracy theories and emphasizes that evidence-based policymaking requires accepting verified election outcomes. In an op-ed for The Washington Post and subsequent interviews, SPPI criticized political figures like former Congressman Steve Pearce who promote false claims of widespread voter fraud, stating that such positions undermine public trust and distract from substantive policy issues.

== Research ==
In 2025, SPPI released Black Market Payday, an investigative report examining alleged unlicensed lending practices by former New Mexico State Representative Tara Jaramillo through her company, Positive Outcomes, Inc. The report detailed instances of employee payday advances with repayment deductions taken directly from paychecks and annual percentage rates (APRs) calculated as high as 2,920%. The investigation raised concerns about regulatory oversight and the consequences of price controls. The report called for state-level enforcement and policy reform to address illicit lending in underserved communities.

In 2025, SPPI published Swipe Right, a report analyzing how digital platforms like Credit Karma and NerdWallet expand credit access for consumers with limited credit histories. The report argues that these tools improve transparency and approval rates, contrasting them with less effective government alternatives. SPPI cautions that increased regulation by agencies like the CFPB could reduce consumer choice and financial inclusion.

In 2022 and 2023, SPPI surveyed more than 600 parents from Albuquerque Public Schools (APS) and over 300 from Las Cruces Public Schools (LCPS) about the past five years of education. Most parents from these two major New Mexico districts expressed dissatisfaction with the quality of public education and preferred higher-quality charter school options, if accessible.

In 2023, SPPI analyzed intragovernmental advocacy in eight American Southwest states. The study revealed consistent taxpayer-funded lobbying practices across states, including Colorado, Oklahoma, New Mexico, and California. Public-sector entities notably influenced topics such as school choice, corporate incentives, criminal justice, and environmental regulations.

In June 2023, SPPI released “No Loan For You!” and “No Loan for You, Too!”, analyzing the impact of price controls on short-term loan accessibility. The report indicated challenges for the underbanked and unbanked in securing such loans, despite the claims of interest rate cap proponents.

== Marianne T. Anderson Memorial Fellowship ==
- Jack Radomski
- Brandt Kringlie
- Wake Gardner
