= James White (New Mexico politician) =

American politician (1942–2021)

Member of the New Mexico Senate from the 19th district
- In office September 27, 2016 – January 15, 2021
- Preceded by: Sue Wilson Beffort
- Succeeded by: Gregg Schmedes

Member of the New Mexico House of Representatives from the 20th district
- In office 2009–2015
- Preceded by: Richard J. Berry
- Succeeded by: Jim Dines

Personal details
- Born: October 4, 1942
- Died: January 15, 2021 (aged 78) Albuquerque, New Mexico, U.S.
- Party: Republican
- Education: Southern Illinois University (BS); University of Southern California (MS)

Military service
- Branch/service: United States Air Force
- Rank: Colonel

James P. "Jim" White (October 4, 1942 – January 15, 2021) was an American politician who served as a member of the New Mexico Senate for the 19th district. White had previously served in the New Mexico House of Representatives, representing District 20.

== Education ==
White earned a Bachelor of Science degree in Economics and Mathematics from Southern Illinois University, followed by a Master of Science in systems management from the University of Southern California.

== Career ==
White was appointed to the New Mexico House of Representatives in 2009 to fill the vacancy caused by the resignation of Richard J. Berry, who was elected Mayor of Albuquerque. He served until 2014, opting not to seek re-election. In 2016, White was nominated by outgoing Governor Susana Martinez to serve in the New Mexico Senate, succeeding Sue Wilson Beffort.

== Elections ==
- 2006 When District 20 Republican Representative Ted Hobbs retired and left the seat open, White ran in the three-way 2006 Republican Primary but lost to Richard Berry; Berry was unopposed for the November 7, 2006 General election, won the seat, and won re-election in 2008. Berry resigned from the Legislature after winning election as mayor of Albuquerque in 2009.
- 2010 White was unopposed for both the June 1, 2010 Republican Primary, winning with 2,542 votes and the November 2, 2010 General election, winning with 7,667 votes.
- 2012 White was unopposed for both the June 5, 2012 Republican Primary, winning with 1,458 votes and the November 6, 2012 General election, winning with 8,717 votes.
- 2020 In the June 2, 2020 primary, White was unseated by Republican state Representative Gregg Schmedes.
