= David Mooney (politician) =

American politician

Member-elect of the New Mexico House of Representatives from the 38th district
- Assuming office January 2027
- Succeeding: Rebecca Dow

Personal details
- Party: Democratic

David Mooney is an American politician. A member of the Democratic Party, he is the member-elect for the 38th district of the New Mexico House of Representatives.
