= Jim Dines =

American politician

Member of the New Mexico House of Representatives from the 20th district
- In office January 20, 2015 – December 31, 2018
- Preceded by: James White
- Succeeded by: Abbas Akhil

Personal details
- Party: Republican
- Education: University of New Mexico (BA, JD)

Jim Dines is an American retired politician and attorney who served as a member of the New Mexico House of Representatives from January 20, 2015, to December 31, 2018.

== Education ==
Dines earned a Bachelor of Arts degree from University of New Mexico in 1969 and a Juris Doctor from the University of New Mexico School of Law in 1972.

== Career ==
Dines worked as an attorney for 39 years, including 24 as the owner of an independent law firm. Dines was elected to the New Mexico House of Representatives in November 2014 and assumed office on January 20, 2015. Dines served in the House for two terms before he was narrowly defeated by Democratic nominee Abbas Akhil in the November 2018 election. In January 2018, Dines was one of eight legislators who developed and expanded new sexual assault and harassment policies for members and employees of the New Mexico Legislature.
