= Pamelya Herndon =

American attorney, accountant, and politician

Member of the New Mexico House of Representatives from the 28th district
- Incumbent
- Assumed office June 22, 2021
- Preceded by: Melanie Stansbury

Personal details
- Born: November 23, 1952 (age 73) Hempstead, Texas, U.S.
- Party: Democratic
- Spouse: Alfred Mathewson (m. 1978)
- Children: 3
- Education: Howard University (BBA); University of Texas at Austin (JD)
- Website: https://pamelyaherndon.com/

Pamelya Herndon (born November 23, 1952) is an American attorney, accountant, and politician serving as a member of the New Mexico House of Representatives from the 28th district since 2021.

== Early life and education ==
Herndon was born November 23, 1952, in Hempstead, Texas, to Kathryn and Daniel Norris Herndon. She is African-American. After attending Roy Miller High School, she earned a Bachelor of Business Administration in accounting from Howard University in 1975 and a Juris Doctor from the University of Texas School of Law in 1978.

== Career ==
Herndon moved to Denver in 1978, where she worked at an accounting firm. She was then hired by the Internal Revenue Service as a litigation attorney. She moved to Albuquerque, New Mexico, in 1983. In 1998, Herndon joined the litigation division of the Attorney General of New Mexico's office. In 2006, she was appointed general counsel of the New Mexico Regulation and Licensing Department. In 2009, she became deputy secretary of the New Mexico General Services Department. Herndon operated an independent legal practice until becoming executive director of the Southwest Women's Law Center in 2012. In October 2018, she became president and CEO of the KWH Law Center for Social Justice and Change. She has taught law courses at the University of New Mexico School of Law and paralegal courses at Brookline College–Albuquerque. Herndon has also hosted radio programs on KUNM.

=== New Mexico House of Representatives ===
On June 22, 2021, Herndon was appointed to the New Mexico House of Representatives by members of the Bernalillo County Commission. Herndon represents the 28th district, which was vacated when Melanie Stansbury resigned to serve in the United States House of Representatives.

== Personal life ==
Herndon married Alfred Mathewson in 1978. They have three children. Mathewson is an emeritus professor and former co-dean at the University of New Mexico School of Law.
