= Kay Bounkeua =

American politician

Member of the New Mexico House of Representatives from the 19th district
- In office August 25, 2021 – January 1, 2023
- Preceded by: Sheryl Williams Stapleton
- Succeeded by: Janelle Anyanonu

Personal details
- Born: Viengkeo Kay Bounkeua
- Party: Democratic
- Education: University of New Mexico (BS); University of Michigan (MPH)

Viengkeo Kay Bounkeua is an American politician who served as a member of the New Mexico House of Representatives for the 19th district from 2021 to 2023. She was selected by members of the Bernalillo County Commission to succeed Sheryl Williams Stapleton, who resigned from the House amid embezzlement charges.

== Early life and education ==
Bounkeua was raised in the Northeast Heights neighborhood of Albuquerque, New Mexico. Of Laotian Chinese descent, her parents immigrated to the United States from Laos via Thailand. She earned a Bachelor of Science degree in biological anthropology from the University of New Mexico and a Master of Public Health from the University of Michigan School of Public Health.

== Career ==
In 2011, Bounkeua joined the New Mexico Asian Family Center, working as director of programs and later as executive director. In April 2020, Bounkeua became the New Mexico deputy director of the Wilderness Society. She was selected to succeed Sheryl Williams Stapleton in the New Mexico House of Representatives by members of the Bernalillo County Commission in August 2021. Upon assuming office, Bounkeua became the first Asian-American woman to serve in the New Mexico Legislature.
