= 2022 New Mexico gubernatorial election =

- November 8, 2022
- Turnout: 52.38% ▼
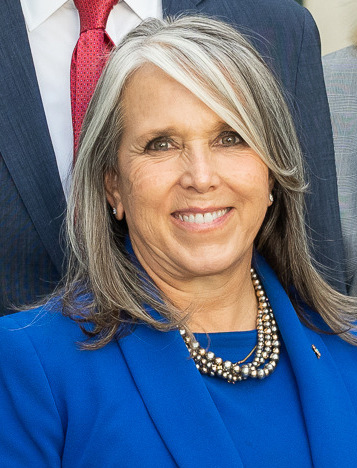

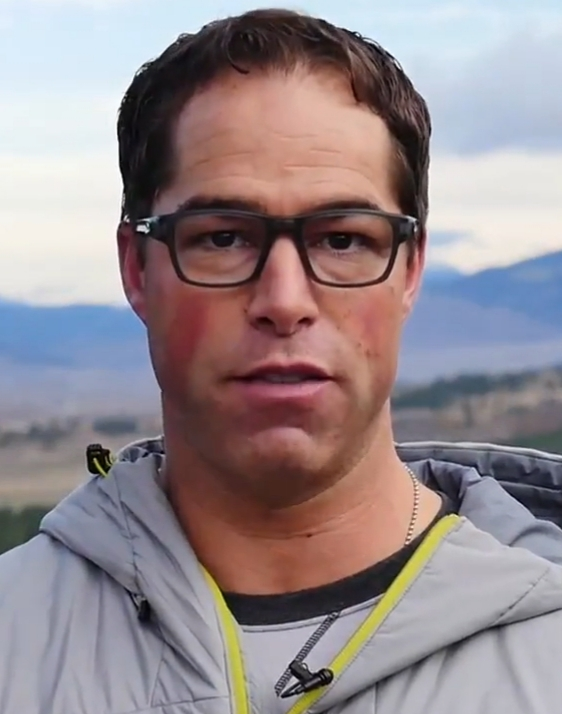
Nominee	Michelle Lujan Grisham	Mark Ronchetti
Party	Democratic	Republican
Running mate	Howie Morales	Ant Thornton
Popular vote	370,168	324,701
Percentage	51.97%	45.59%
- Lujan Grisham: 40–50% 50–60% 60–70% 70–80% 80–90% >90% Ronchetti: 40–50% 50–60% 60–70% 70–80% 80–90% >90% Tie: 40–50% No data
Governor before election
Michelle Lujan Grisham
Democratic
Elected Governor
Michelle Lujan Grisham
Democratic

The 2022 New Mexico gubernatorial election took place on November 8, 2022, to elect the governor and lieutenant governor of New Mexico. The election coincided with various other federal and state elections. Primary elections were held on June 7.

Incumbent Democratic Governor Michelle Lujan Grisham won a second term by a margin of 6.38%. She was first elected in 2018 with 57.2% of the vote. Her opponent was Republican Mark Ronchetti, who was also his party's nominee in New Mexico's 2020 U.S. Senate election.

Despite losing, Ronchetti managed to carry a congressional district that elected Democrat Gabe Vasquez in the concurrent U.S. House elections. This was the first gubernatorial election in New Mexico since 1986 in which the winner was from the same party as the incumbent president, and the first time since 1978 that it was a Democrat.

== Democratic primary ==
=== Governor ===
==== Candidates ====
===== Nominated =====
- Michelle Lujan Grisham, incumbent governor (2019–present)

==== Endorsements ====
Michelle Lujan Grisham

Organizations

- EMILY's List

==== Results ====
Gubernatorial Democratic primary results
Party	Candidate	Votes	%
Democratic	Michelle Lujan Grisham (incumbent)	125,238	100.0%
Total votes		125,238	100.0%

=== Lieutenant governor ===
==== Candidates ====
===== Nominated =====
- Howie Morales, incumbent lieutenant governor (2019–present)

==== Results ====
Lieutenant gubernatorial Democratic primary results
Party	Candidate	Votes	%
Democratic	Howie Morales (incumbent)	117,293	100.0%
Total votes		117,293	100.0%

== Republican primary ==
=== Governor ===
==== Candidates ====
===== Nominated =====
- Mark Ronchetti, former KRQE meteorologist and nominee for the U.S. Senate in 2020

===== Eliminated in primary =====
- Jay Block, Sandoval County commissioner and retired U.S. Air Force officer
- Rebecca Dow, state representative (2017–2023)
- Ethel Maharg, Right to Life of New Mexico executive director
- Gregory Zanetti, retired U.S. Army National Guard officer and former chair of the Bernalillo County Republican Party

===== Withdrew =====
- Karen Bedonie, businesswoman (running as a Libertarian)
- Louie Sanchez, shooting range owner (ran for U.S. House)
- Tim Walsh, former advisor to Governor Gary Johnson and former Lake City, Minnesota city councilman (ran as a Libertarian)

===== Declined =====
- Yvette Herrell, U.S. representative from New Mexico's 2nd congressional district (2021–2023) (ran for re-election)

==== Polling ====
Aggregate polls

Source of poll aggregation	Dates administered	Dates updated	Jay Block	Rebecca Dow	Mark Ronchetti	Greg Zanetti	Other (Note: Calculated by taking the difference of 100% and all other candidates combined.)	Margin
Real Clear Politics	April 29 – May 19, 2022	May 23, 2022	10.0%	13.0%	44.5%	9.5%	23.0%	Ronchetti +31.5

Poll source	Date(s) administered	Sample size (Note: Key: A – all adults RV – registered voters LV – likely voters V – unclear)	Margin of error	Jay Block	Rebecca Dow	Mark Ronchetti	Greg Zanetti	Other	Undecided
Research & Polling Inc.	May 15–19, 2022	560 (LV)	± 4.1%	8%	17%	45%	9%	1% (Note: Maharg with 1%)	21%
SurveyUSA	April 29 – May 7, 2022	505 (LV)	± 6.4%	12%	9%	44%	10%	2% (Note: Maharg with 2%)	23%
Public Opinion Strategies (R) (Note: The poll was sponsored by Ronchetti's campaign)	January 31 – February 1, 2022	400 (LV)	± 4.9%	2%	9%	60%	7%	3%	19%

==== Debate ====
2022 New Mexico gubernatorial election Republican primary debate
No.	Date	Host	Moderator	Link	Republican	Republican	Republican	Republican	Republican
Key: P Participant A Absent N Not invited I Invited W Withdrawn									
Key: P Participant A Absent N Not invited I Invited W Withdrawn					Jay Block	Rebecca Dow	Ethel Maharg	Mark Ronchetti	Gregory Zanetti
1		Albuquerque Journal; KKOB-FM; KOAT-TV	Doug Fernandez	YouTube	P	P	P	P	P

==== Results ====
Results by county: Ronchetti: 30–40%; 40–50%; 50–60%; 60–70%; 70–80%; Dow: 30–40%; 40–50%; 50–60%

Gubernatorial Republican primary results
Party	Candidate	Votes	%
Republican	Mark Ronchetti	68,658	58.41%
Republican	Rebecca Dow	18,185	15.47%
Republican	Gregory Zanetti	16,394	13.95%
Republican	Jay Block	12,469	10.61%
Republican	Ethel Maharg	1,845	1.57%
Total votes		117,551	100.0%

=== Lieutenant governor ===
==== Candidates ====
===== Nominated =====
- Ant Thornton, aerospace engineer

===== Eliminated in primary =====
- Peggy Muller-Aragon, member of the Albuquerque Public Schools Board of Education

===== Eliminated at convention =====
- Patrick H. Lyons, former New Mexico Commissioner of Public Lands and former member of the New Mexico Public Regulation Commission
- Anastacia Morper, real estate agent
- Isabella Solis, Doña Ana County commissioner

==== Results ====
Results by county: Thornton: 50–60%; 60–70%; 70–80%; Muller-Aragon: 50–60%; 60–70%; Tie: 50%

Lieutenant gubernatorial Republican primary results
Party	Candidate	Votes	%
Republican	Ant Thornton	64,386	59.71%
Republican	Peggy Muller-Aragon	43,438	40.29%
Total votes		107,824	100.0%

== Libertarian primary ==
=== Governor ===
==== Candidates ====
===== Nominated =====
- Karen Bedonie, businesswoman and candidate for New Mexico's 3rd congressional district in 2020

===== Eliminated in primary =====
- Ginger G. Grider, nominee for Secretary of State of New Mexico in 2018

===== Withdrew =====
- Tim Walsh, former advisor to Governor Gary Johnson and former Lake City, Minnesota city councilman

Endorsements

Ginger G. Grider

Individuals

- Nicholas Sarwark, former Chair of Libertarian National Committee (2014–2020)

==== Results ====
Gubernatorial Libertarian primary results
Party	Candidate	Votes	%
Libertarian	Karen Bedonie	980	86.12%
Libertarian	Ginger G. Grider (write-in)	158	13.88%
Total votes		1,138	100.0%

=== Lieutenant governor ===
Travis Sanchez won the Libertarian primary unopposed, but withdrew to become the Libertarian nominee for New Mexico State Auditor. Sanchez was replaced by Efren Gallardo Jr.

==== Candidates ====
===== Declared =====
- Efren Gallardo Jr.

===== Withdrew =====
- Travis Sanchez, activist

==== Results ====
Lieutenant gubernatorial Libertarian primary results
Party	Candidate	Votes	%
Libertarian	Travis Sanchez	1,175	100.0%
Total votes		1,175	100.0%

== General election ==
=== Predictions ===
Source	Ranking	As of
The Cook Political Report	Lean D	June 8, 2022
Inside Elections	Tilt D	November 3, 2022
Sabato's Crystal Ball	Lean D	January 26, 2022
Politico	Lean D	April 1, 2022
RCP	Tossup	June 20, 2022
Fox News	Tossup	August 22, 2022
538	Likely D	July 31, 2022
Elections Daily	Lean D	November 7, 2022

=== Endorsements ===
Michelle Lujan Grisham (D)

U.S. presidents

- Joe Biden, 46th president of the United States (2021–2025)
- Barack Obama, 44th president of the United States (2009–2017)

Federal officials

- Kamala Harris, 49th vice president of the United States (2021–2025)

State officials

- Gavin Newsom, governor of California (2019–present)

Local officials

- Ravi Bhasker, mayor of Socorro
- Luis Bonaguidi, mayor of Gallup
- Tim Keller, mayor of Albuquerque
- Ken Ladner, mayor of Silver City
- Javier Perea, mayor of Sunland Park
- Louie Trujillo, mayor of Las Vegas, New Mexico
- Alan Webber, mayor of Santa Fe

Labor unions

- American Federation of State, County and Municipal Employees
- National Education Association
- United Auto Workers
- United Mine Workers

Organizations

- ActBlue
- Animal Protection Voters
- Democratic Governors Association
- Everytown for Gun Safety
- Feminist Majority PAC
- Giffords
- Human Rights Campaign
- Latino Victory Fund
- League of Conservation Voters
- NARAL Pro-Choice America
- Planned Parenthood
Mark Ronchetti (R)

U.S. presidents

- Donald Trump, 45th president of the United States (2017–2021)

Federal officials

- Nikki Haley, United States Ambassador to the United Nations (2017–2018) and former governor of South Carolina (2011–2017)
- Yvette Herrell, U.S. representative for New Mexico's 2nd congressional district (2021–2023)
- Mike Pence, 48th vice president of the United States (2017–2021)

State officials

- Ron DeSantis, Governor of Florida (2019–present) and former U.S. Representative for Florida's 6th congressional district (2013–2018)
- Doug Ducey, Governor of Arizona (2015–2023)
- Gary Johnson, former governor of New Mexico (1995–2003) (Libertarian)
- Glenn Youngkin, Governor of Virginia (2022–2026)

Sheriffs

- David Black, Otero County sheriff
- Shane Ferrari, San Juan County sheriff
- Corey Helton, Lea County sheriff
- Denise Vigil, Valencia County sheriff

Organizations

- ABQ Journal
- CatholicVote.org
- NRA Political Victory Fund

=== Polling ===
Aggregate polls

Source of poll aggregation	Dates administered	Dates updated	Michelle Lujan Grisham (D)	Mark Ronchetti (R)	Karen Bedonie (L)	Other (Note: Calculated by taking the difference of 100% and all other candidates combined.)	Margin
Real Clear Politics	October 6–21, 2022	October 21, 2022	47.0%	43.5%	–	9.5%	Lujan Grisham +3.5
FiveThirtyEight	June 14 – October 24, 2022	October 24, 2022	48.7%	41.1%	4.9%	5.3%	Lujan Grisham +7.6
Average			47.9%	42.3%	–	7.4%	Lujan Grisham +5.6

Poll source	Date(s) administered	Sample size	Margin of error	Michelle Lujan Grisham (D)	Mark Ronchetti (R)	Karen Bedonie (L)	Other	Undecided
Emerson College	October 25–28, 2022	1,000 (LV)	± 3.0%	49%	46%	2%	<1% (Note: "Someone else" with <1%)	3%
Emerson College	October 25–28, 2022	1,000 (LV)	± 3.0%	50%	48%	2%	<1% (Note: "Someone else" with <1%)	–
Research & Polling Inc. (Note: Poll conducted for the Albuquerque Journal.)	October 20–27, 2022	1,254 (LV)	± 2.8%	50%	42%	3%	–	5%
SurveyUSA	October 21–26, 2022	650 (LV)	± 4.9%	46%	39%	5%	–	9%
The Trafalgar Group (R)	October 19–21, 2022	1,077 (LV)	± 2.9%	46%	47%	4%	–	4%
Public Policy Polling (D)	October 6–7, 2022	806 (V)	± 3.5%	48%	40%	7%	–	6%
SurveyUSA	October 1–6, 2022	570 (LV)	± 5.8%	53%	37%	3%	–	7%
Cygnal (R) (Note: Poll sponsored by Jeremy Gay, the Republican nominee for New Mexico Attorney General.)	September 27–29, 2022	400 (LV)	± 4.9%	46%	44%	5%	–	5%
SurveyUSA	September 8–12, 2022	558 (LV)	± 5.7%	48%	36%	5%	–	11%
Emerson College	September 8–11, 2022	1,000 (LV)	± 3.0%	48%	43%	–	3% (Note: "Someone else" with 3%)	5%
Research & Polling Inc.	August 19–25, 2022	518 (LV)	± 4.3%	47%	40%	5%	–	8%
GQR Research (D) (Note: This poll was sponsored by EDF Action)	June 11–17, 2022	500 (LV)	± 4.4%	48%	44%	5%	–	3%
Public Policy Polling (D)	June 13–14, 2022	642 (V)	± 3.9%	45%	42%	9%	–	5%
Public Opinion Strategies (R)	June 11–14, 2022	600 (LV)	± 4.0%	45%	46%	–	–	9%
SurveyUSA	April 29 – May 7, 2022	1,389 (LV)	± 3.6%	47%	43%	–	–	11%
Cygnal (R) (Note: This poll was sponsored by Zanetti's campaign)	January 3–4, 2022	531 (LV)	± 4.2%	43%	42%	–	–	16%

Hypothetical polling

Michelle Lujan Grisham vs. Jay Block

Poll source	Date(s) administered	Sample size	Margin of error	Michelle Lujan Grisham (D)	Jay Block (R)	Undecided
SurveyUSA	April 29 – May 7, 2022	1,389 (LV)	± 3.6%	47%	37%	16%

Michelle Lujan Grisham vs. Rebecca Dow

Poll source	Date(s) administered	Sample size	Margin of error	Michelle Lujan Grisham (D)	Rebecca Dow (R)	Undecided
SurveyUSA	April 29 – May 7, 2022	1,389 (LV)	± 3.6%	48%	36%	16%
Cygnal (R)	January 3–4, 2022	531 (LV)	± 4.2%	43%	36%	20%

Michelle Lujan Grisham vs. Ethel Maharg

Poll source	Date(s) administered	Sample size	Margin of error	Michelle Lujan Grisham (D)	Ethel Maharg (R)	Undecided
SurveyUSA	April 29 – May 7, 2022	1,389 (LV)	± 3.6%	48%	32%	19%

Michelle Lujan Grisham vs. Gregory Zanetti

Poll source	Date(s) administered	Sample size	Margin of error	Michelle Lujan Grisham (D)	Gregory Zanetti (R)	Undecided
SurveyUSA	April 29 – May 7, 2022	1,389 (LV)	± 3.6%	48%	36%	16%
Cygnal (R)	January 3–4, 2022	531 (LV)	± 4.2%	43%	38%	21%

Michelle Lujan Grisham vs. generic Republican

Poll source	Date(s) administered	Sample size	Margin of error	Michelle Lujan Grisham (D)	Generic Republican	Undecided
Cygnal (R)	July 6–8, 2021	600 (LV)	± 4.0%	45%	47%	7%

=== Debates ===
2022 New Mexico gubernatorial general election debates
No.	Date	Host	Moderator	Link	Democratic	Republican	Libertarian
Key: P Participant A Absent N Non-invitee I Invitee W Withdrawn							
Key: P Participant A Absent N Non-invitee I Invitee W Withdrawn					Michelle Lujan Grisham	Mark Ronchetti	Karen Bedonie
1	Oct. 13, 2022	KOAT-TV	Doug Fernandez		P	P	N

=== Results ===
2022 New Mexico gubernatorial election
Party	Candidate	Votes	%	±%
Democratic	Michelle Lujan Grisham (incumbent); Howie Morales (incumbent)	370,168	51.97%	−5.23%
Republican	Mark Ronchetti; Ant Thornton	324,701	45.59%	+2.79%
Libertarian	Karen Bedonie; Efren Gallardo, Jr.	17,387	2.44%	N/A
Total votes		712,256	100.0%	
Turnout		714,797	52.38%	N/A
Registered electors		1,364,559		
Democratic hold				

==== By county ====
County	Michelle Lujan Grisham Democratic		Mark Ronchetti Republican		Karen Bedonie Libertarian		Margin		Total
County	#	%	#	%	#	%	#	%	Total
Bernalillo	141,177	57.55%	99,639	40.62%	4,484	1.83%	41,538	16.93%	245,300
Catron	471	23.29%	1,493	73.84%	58	2.87%	-1,022	-50.54%	2,022
Chaves	4,063	24.89%	11,884	72.79%	379	2.32%	-7,821	-47.91%	16,326
Cibola	3,418	49.75%	3,230	47.02%	222	3.23%	188	2.74%	6,870
Colfax	2,053	41.82%	2,719	55.39%	137	2.79%	-666	-13.57%	4,909
Curry	2,516	24.55%	7,092	69.20%	640	6.25%	-4,576	-44.65%	10,248
De Baca	167	22.03%	566	74.67%	25	3.30%	-399	-52.64%	758
Doña Ana	32,147	55.69%	23,213	40.21%	2,364	4.10%	8,934	15.48%	57,724
Eddy	3,376	20.20%	12,996	77.75%	344	2.06%	-9,620	-57.55%	16,716
Grant	6,185	52.88%	5,217	44.60%	294	2.51%	968	8.28%	11,696
Guadalupe	915	52.56%	784	45.03%	42	2.41%	131	7.52%	1,741
Harding	129	30.79%	280	66.83%	10	2.39%	-151	-36.04%	419
Hidalgo	645	39.72%	914	56.28%	65	4.00%	-269	-16.56%	1,624
Lea	2,104	15.02%	11,542	82.40%	362	2.58%	-9,438	-67.38%	14,008
Lincoln	2,334	27.94%	5,778	69.16%	243	2.91%	-3,444	-41.22%	8,355
Los Alamos	6,192	61.02%	3,751	36.96%	205	2.02%	2,441	24.05%	10,148
Luna	2,445	41.52%	3,250	55.19%	194	3.29%	-805	-13.67%	5,889
McKinley	12,910	66.27%	5,799	29.77%	772	3.96%	7,111	36.50%	19,481
Mora	1,584	64.47%	832	33.86%	41	1.67%	752	30.61%	2,457
Otero	5,852	33.17%	11,182	63.38%	608	3.45%	-5,330	-30.21%	17,642
Quay	803	26.53%	2,104	69.51%	120	3.96%	-1,301	-42.98%	3,027
Rio Arriba	8,037	62.01%	4,729	36.49%	195	1.50%	3,308	25.52%	12,961
Roosevelt	1,087	23.32%	3,177	68.15%	398	8.54%	-2,090	-44.83%	4,662
San Juan	12,849	32.08%	25,574	63.85%	1,631	4.07%	-12,725	-31.77%	40,054
San Miguel	6,531	68.98%	2,785	29.41%	152	1.61%	3,746	39.56%	9,468
Sandoval	30,789	50.28%	29,337	47.91%	1,109	1.81%	1,452	2.37%	61,235
Santa Fe	52,447	75.35%	16,287	23.40%	868	1.25%	36,160	51.95%	69,602
Sierra	1,780	36.19%	3,001	61.01%	138	2.81%	-1,221	-24.82%	4,919
Socorro	2,950	48.05%	2,988	48.66%	202	3.29%	-38	-0.62%	6,140
Taos	10,188	76.33%	2,964	22.21%	196	1.47%	7,224	54.12%	13,348
Torrance	1,588	28.64%	3,712	66.96%	244	4.40%	-2,124	-38.31%	5,544
Union	328	21.87%	1,101	73.40%	71	4.73%	-773	-51.53%	1,500
Valencia	10,108	39.70%	14,781	58.05%	574	2.25%	-4,673	-18.35%	25,463
Totals	370,168	51.97%	324,701	45.59%	17,387	2.44%	45,467	6.38%	712,256

Counties that flipped from Democratic to Republican

- Socorro (largest city: Socorro)

==== By congressional district ====
Lujan Grisham won two of three congressional districts, with Ronchetti winning the remaining one, which elected a Democrat.

District	Lujan Grisham	Ronchetti	Representative
1st	53%	45%	Melanie Stansbury
2nd	48%	49%	Yvette Herrell (117th Congress)
2nd	48%	49%	Gabe Vasquez (118th Congress)
3rd	54%	44%	Teresa Leger Fernandez

== Notes ==
Partisan clients
