= David E. Adkins =

American politician

David Adkins

Member of the New Mexico House of Representatives from the 29th district
- In office January 2015 – December 31, 2018
- Succeeded by: Joy Garratt

Personal details
- Party: Republican
- Children: 2

Military service
- Branch/service: United States Air Force

David E. Adkins is an American businessman, pastor, and former politician who served as a member of the New Mexico House of Representatives from the 29th district. Elected in November 2014, he assumed office in January 2015 and left office on December 31, 2018.

== Career ==
Adkins served in the United States Air Force. He was later the pastor of the New Covenant Church in Albuquerque, New Mexico and operated small businesses, including a waste management company. Adkins was the chaplain of the Albuquerque Police Department.

Elected to the New Mexico House of Representatives in November 2014, he assumed office in January 2015. During his tenure, Adkins was the ranking member of the House Land Grants & Cultural Affairs Committee. In 2018, Adkins was defeated for re-election by Democratic nominee Joy Garratt.
