= Tara Jaramillo =

American politician, speech language pathologist, and businesswoman

Member of the New Mexico House of Representatives from the 38th district
- In office January 1, 2023 – January 1, 2025
- Preceded by: Rebecca Dow
- Succeeded by: Rebecca Dow

Personal details
- Party: Democratic
- Education: New Mexico State University (BA, MS)

Tara Jaramillo is an American politician, speech language pathologist, and businesswoman serving as a member of the New Mexico House of Representatives for the 38th district. Elected in November 2022, she assumed office on January 1, 2023.

== Education ==
Jaramillo earned a Bachelor of Arts in special education and Master of Science in speech language pathology from New Mexico State University.

== Career ==
From 1993 to 1997, Jaramillo worked as a speech language pathologist at La Vida Felicidad Early Intervention in Los Lunas, New Mexico. She worked at Presbyterian Hospital from 1997 to 1999. In 1999, she founded Positive Outcomes, a healthcare organization with over 400 employees. She was elected to the New Mexico House of Representatives in November 2022.

In 2025, Tara Jaramillo faced scrutiny following the publication of a report by the Southwest Public Policy Institute alleging that her company, Positive Outcomes, Inc., operated an unlicensed employee loan program. The report, authored by Patrick M. Brenner and others, claimed the loans carried high effective interest rates and lacked required disclosures under federal lending laws. Jaramillo denied the allegations, stating the loans were intended as a low-interest employee benefit and were legally vetted. The New Mexico Department of Workforce Solutions opened an investigation, which remained ongoing as of mid-2025.
