= Stefani Lord =

American politician and activist

Member of the New Mexico House of Representatives from the 22nd district
- Incumbent
- Assumed office January 19, 2021
- Preceded by: Gregg Schmedes

Personal details
- Born: Los Angeles, California, U.S.
- Party: Republican
- Education: Portland State University (BS)

Stefani Lord is an American politician serving as a member of the New Mexico House of Representatives from the 22nd district. Elected in 2020, Lord assumed office on January 19, 2021.

== Early life and education ==
Lord was born in Los Angeles, California. She earned a Bachelor of Science degree in psychology from Portland State University in 2000.

== Career ==
In 1997, Lord moved from Los Angeles to Idaho. She later relocated to Los Alamos, New Mexico to work at the Los Alamos National Laboratory.

During her campaign, Lord planned to participate in an event in support of the New Mexico Civil Guard, a far-right militia group. After it was reported that the founder of the group was a former neo-Nazi, Lord dropped out of the event. In the 2020 November general election, Lord defeated Democratic nominee Jessica Velasquez.
