= Sheryl Williams Stapleton =

American politician (born 1957)

Majority Leader of the New Mexico House of Representatives
- In office January 17, 2017 – July 30, 2021
- Preceded by: Nate Gentry
- Succeeded by: Doreen Gallegos (Acting)

Member of the New Mexico House of Representatives from the 19th district
- In office January 1995 – July 30, 2021
- Succeeded by: Kay Bounkeua

Personal details
- Born: July 30, 1957 (age 69) Saint Croix, Virgin Islands
- Party: Democratic
- Education: New Mexico State University (BS); University of New Mexico (MA, PhD)

Sheryl Williams Stapleton (/ˈstæpəltən/ STAP-əl-tən; born July 30, 1957) is an American politician, educator, and convicted felon who served as a member of the New Mexico House of Representatives from 1995 until her resignation in July 2021. A member of the Democratic Party, she also served as the majority floor leader in the House from 2017 to 2021.

== Early life and education ==
Stapleton was born in Saint Croix. She was raised in Chicago and New York City. She earned a Bachelor of Science degree in education from New Mexico State University, followed by Master of Arts in multicultural education and PhD in educational leadership from the University of New Mexico.

== Career ==
Prior to entering politics, Stapleton worked as an educator in the Albuquerque Public Schools. She also served as the coordinator for the Schools to Careers Program and assistant principal of the Career Enrichment Center. She was first elected to the New Mexico House of Representatives in 1994 and is the first African-American woman elected to the New Mexico Legislature. She has also served as vice chair of the Democratic Party of New Mexico and a member of the Democratic National Committee from New Mexico. Following the 2016 elections, Williams was chosen by the Democratic Caucus of New Mexico as house majority leader. She was the first African American majority leader of the New Mexico House.

== Investigation and resignation ==
Investigators from the New Mexico Attorney General's office executed a search warrant on July 27, 2021, on Stapleton's home, business, and employer. On July 30, 2021, Stapleton resigned from the House amid a criminal investigation into alleged "racketeering, money laundering, receiving illegal kickbacks, and violations of the New Mexico Governmental Conduct Act". On August 31, 2021, Albuquerque Public Schools fired Stapleton from her position as Career and Technical Education director.

Stapleton was charged in state court on September 20, 2021, with 28 criminal counts, including racketeering, money laundering and fraud by diverting funds from Albuquerque Public Schools and receiving kickbacks from Robotics Learning Management LLC "in return for arranging or recommending the purchase, lease or ordering of the company’s goods by Albuquerque Public Schools." On March 26, 2024, Joseph Johnson, owner of Robotics Management Learning Systems, and Sheryl Williams Stapleton were indicted in federal court due to federal funds being used during the fraud in the case. The 23-page indictment alleges that Johnson provided blank checks that allowed Stapleton to get kickbacks of $1,152,506 from the funds that were paid to Robotics Management Learning Systems through a mixture of state and federal Perkins funds. On August 14, 2026, Stapleton was convicted by a federal jury of all 31 felony charges against her, with Johnson being convicted of 28 felony charges. Stapleton and Johnson were released with sentencing to follow within 90 days.

New Mexico House of Representatives
Preceded by Nate Gentry	Majority Leader of the New Mexico House of Representatives; 2017–2021	Succeeded by Doreen Gallegos; Acting
