= Rebecca Dow =

American politician (born 1973)

Member of the New Mexico House of Representatives from the 38th district
- Incumbent
- Assumed office January 1, 2025
- Preceded by: Tara Jaramillo
- Succeeded by: David Mooney (elect)
- In office January 1, 2017 – January 1, 2023
- Preceded by: Dianne Hamilton
- Succeeded by: Tara Jaramillo

Personal details
- Born: June 26, 1973 (age 53)
- Party: Republican
- Education: Tulsa Community College (AA); Oral Roberts University (BS)

Rebecca L. Dow (born June 26, 1973) is an American politician who serves as a member of the New Mexico House of Representatives for the 38th district, having previously represented it from 2017 to 2023. She was an unsuccessful candidate for the Republican nomination in the 2022 New Mexico gubernatorial election. She placed second in the primary with 15.47% of the vote, behind former KRQE meteorologist Mark Ronchetti.

Dow earned an associate's degree from Tulsa Community College and a Bachelor of Science degree in business management from Oral Roberts University.
