= Willie D. Madrid =

American politician

Willie Madrid

Member of the New Mexico House of Representatives from the 53rd district
- In office January 1, 2019 – January 1, 2025
- Preceded by: Ricky Little
- Succeeded by: Sarah Silva

Personal details
- Born: Chaparral, New Mexico, U.S.
- Party: Democratic

Willie D. Madrid is an American politician and educator, currently serving as a member of the New Mexico House of Representatives from the 53rd district, which includes Doña Ana, New Mexico.

== Early life ==
Madrid is a native of Chaparral, New Mexico.

== Career ==
Prior to entering politics, Madrid worked as an instructional assistant and football coach in the Gadsden Independent Schools. In the 2018 election, Madrid defeated incumbent Republican Ricky Little. He took office on January 15, 2019.
