= Randal Crowder =

American politician (born 1950)

Member of the New Mexico House of Representatives from the 64th district
- In office January 1, 2015 – January 1, 2023
- Preceded by: Anna Crook
- Succeeded by: Andrea Reeb

Personal details
- Born: July 12, 1950 (age 76)
- Party: Republican

Randal Crowder (born July 12, 1950) is an American politician who served in the New Mexico House of Representatives to 2015 to 2023, where he represented the 64th district.
