= Daymon Ely =

American politician and attorney from New Mexico

Member of the New Mexico House of Representatives from the 23rd district
- In office January 1, 2017 – January 1, 2023
- Preceded by: Paul Pacheco
- Succeeded by: Kathleen Cates (Redistricting)

Personal details
- Born: October 11, 1957 (age 68) Philadelphia, Pennsylvania, U.S.
- Party: Democratic
- Education: Arizona State University (BA, JD)

Daymon Ely is an American politician and attorney who served as a member of the New Mexico House of Representatives for the 23rd district from 2017 to 2023.

== Early life and education ==
Ely was born on October 11, 1957, in Philadelphia and raised in Phoenix, Arizona. He earned a Bachelor of Arts in History and Juris Doctor from the Arizona State University.

== Career ==
After graduating from law school, Ely became a legal malpractice attorney. From 2000 to 2004, Ely served on the Sandoval County Commission, and as its chair in 2004. Ely was elected to the New Mexico House of Representatives in 2016. Ely is a member of the Democratic Party.

In the House, Ely supported Red flag laws.
