= Christine Chandler =

American politician (born 1958)

Member of the New Mexico House of Representatives from the 43rd district
- Incumbent
- Assumed office January 15, 2019
- Preceded by: Stephanie Garcia Richard

Personal details
- Born: Christine Gray; June 21, 1958 (age 68) Northampton, Massachusetts, U.S.
- Party: Democratic
- Spouse: George Chandler
- Children: 3
- Education: Smith College (BA); Boston College (JD); Georgetown University (LLM)

Christine F. Chandler (née Gray; born June 21, 1958) is an American politician, lawyer, and former judge serving as a member of the New Mexico House of Representatives from the 43rd district.

== Early life and education ==
Chandler was born in Northampton, Massachusetts. She earned a Bachelor of Arts degree in economics from Smith College, a Juris Doctor from the Boston College Law School, and a Master of Laws in international and comparative law from the Georgetown University Law Center.

== Career ==
Prior to serving in the House, Chandler was a probate judge for the Los Alamos County Probate Court from August 2013 to February 2016. Chandler was a member of the Los Alamos County Council and has operated a private law practice. She served as chair of the council in 1999 and vice chair in 2018. She served as senior counsel at Los Alamos National Security. Chandler took office on January 15, 2019, succeeding retiring Democratic incumbent Stephanie Garcia Richard, who was elected New Mexico Commissioner of Public Lands.
