= Rodolpho Martinez =

American politician

Rodolpho S. Martinez

Member of the New Mexico House of Representatives from the 39th district
- In office 2017–2021
- Preceded by: John L. Zimmerman
- Succeeded by: Luis Terrazas
- In office 2007–2015

Personal details
- Born: New Mexico, U.S.
- Party: Democratic
- Education: Western New Mexico University (BS)

Military service
- Branch/service: United States Air Force
- Battles/wars: Vietnam War

Rodolpho Martinez is an American politician who served as a member of the New Mexico House of Representatives for District 39 from 2017 to 2021. He previously held the same seat from 2007 until 2015.

== Early life and education ==
Martinez was born in New Mexico. He earned a Bachelor of Science degree in business from Western New Mexico University.

== Career ==
He served in the United States Air Force during the Vietnam War. Martinez has worked as a facility services manager. In 2006, Martinez was elected to the New Mexico House of Representatives. In 2014, he was defeated for re-election by Republican John L. Zimmerman. Martinez defeated Zimmerman in 2016 and regained his old House seat. In 2020, Martinez was again defeated for re-election by Republican Luis Terrazas. He left office in January 2021.
