= Candie Sweetser =

American politician

Member of the New Mexico House of Representatives from the 32nd district
- In office January 1, 2017 – January 1, 2023
- Preceded by: Dona Irwin
- Succeeded by: Jenifer Jones

Personal details
- Born: November 17, 1962 (age 63) Albuquerque, New Mexico, U.S.
- Party: Democratic

Candie Sweetser (born November 17, 1962) is an American politician who served as a member of the New Mexico House of Representatives for the 32nd district from 2017 to 2023.
