= Karen C. Bash =

American politician, pastor, educator, and businesswoman

Karen Bash

Member of the New Mexico House of Representatives from the 68th district
- In office January 15, 2019 – January 1, 2023
- Preceded by: Monica Youngblood
- Succeeded by: Charlotte Little

Personal details
- Born: Albuquerque, New Mexico, U.S.
- Party: Democratic
- Education: Phillips University (BA); Lamar University (MEd); Dubuque Theological Seminary (MDiV)

Karen C. Bash is an American politician, pastor, educator, and businesswoman who served as a member of the New Mexico House of Representatives for the 68th district from 2019 to 2023.

== Early life and education ==
Bash is a native of Albuquerque, New Mexico. She earned a Bachelor of Arts from Phillips University, Master of Education from Lamar University, and Masters of Divinity from the Dubuque Theological Seminary.

== Career ==
Prior to entering politics, Bash worked as a Methodist pastor and operated a bed and breakfast. From 1977 to 1979, she worked as an early childhood teacher and later managed a halfway house. A member of the Democratic Party, Bash defeated Republican incumbent Monica Youngblood in the 2018 election for a seat in the New Mexico House of Representatives and assumed office on January 15, 2019.
