= Raymundo Lara =

American politician

Member of the New Mexico House of Representatives from the 34th district
- Incumbent
- Assumed office January 15, 2019
- Preceded by: Bealquin "Bill" Gomez

Personal details
- Party: Democratic
- Education: New Mexico State University (BA)

Raymundo Lara is an American politician and educator, currently serving as a member of the New Mexico House of Representatives from the 34th district, which includes San Miguel, La Mesa, Chamberino, La Union, Santa Teresa, and Sunland Park in Doña Ana County.

== Education ==
Lara earned a Bachelor of Arts degree from New Mexico State University.

== Career ==
Prior to entering politics, Lara spent 17 years in K-12 education and worked as the program coordinator for the Gadsden Independent Schools. In 2018, Lara defeated incumbent Democrat Bealquin "Bill" Gomez and took office on January 15, 2019. He is a member of the Democratic Party. In the 57th New Mexico Legislature, Lara serves as Vice Chair on the House Transportation, Public Works & Capital Improvements Committee, and as a member of the House Education Committee.
