= Gregg Schmedes =

American politician

Member of the New Mexico House of Representatives from the 22nd district
- In office 2018 – December 31, 2020
- Preceded by: James Smith
- Succeeded by: Stefani Lord

Member of the New Mexico Senate from the 19th district
- In office January 1, 2021 – December 31, 2024
- Preceded by: James White
- Succeeded by: Ant Thornton

Personal details
- Born: Texas, U.S.
- Party: Republican
- Children: 8
- Education: University of Texas at Austin (BS); Texas Tech University (MD)

Gregg Schmedes is an American physician and politician who served as a member of the New Mexico Senate from the 19th district from 2021 to 2024. He previously served as a member of the New Mexico House of Representatives from the 22nd district, which includes portions of Bernalillo, Sandoval, and Santa Fe counties.

== Early life and education ==
Schmedes was born and raised in Texas. He earned a Bachelor of Science in electrical engineering from the University of Texas at Austin and Doctor of Medicine from the Texas Tech University Health Sciences Center.

== Career ==
In addition to serving in the New Mexico House of Representatives, Schmedes has also worked as an assistant professor of surgery at the University of New Mexico Hospital. He also serves as New Mexico’s director for the American Academy of Medical Ethics. Schmedes was elected to the New Mexico House in 2018. In 2020, Schmedes announced that he would not seek re-election and instead run for New Mexico Senate. He won the November general election, defeating incumbent Republican James White. He assumed office on January 1, 2021.

== Personal life ==
Schmedes and his wife, Kelley, have eight children.
