= Harry Garcia =

American politician and businessman

Member of the New Mexico House of Representatives from the 69th district
- In office September 9, 2016 – December 31, 2024
- Preceded by: W. Ken Martinez
- Succeeded by: Michelle Paulene Abeyta

Personal details
- Party: Democratic

Military service
- Branch/service: United States Marine Corps
- Battles/wars: Vietnam War

Harry Garcia is an American politician and businessman who was a member of the New Mexico House of Representatives for the 69th district. He assumed office in 2016.

== Career ==
Garcia served as a member of the United States Marine Corps in the Vietnam War. After the war, Garcia operated his own business. Garcia was nominated to the New Mexico House of Representatives in 2016 to succeed former Speaker W. Ken Martinez. He took office on September 9, 2016, and was re-elected in 2018.

In the 2024 New Mexico House of Representatives election, he was defeated in the primary by Michelle Paulene Abeyta.

== Personal life ==
Garcia is a resident of Grants, New Mexico.
