= Angelica Rubio =

American politician

Member of the New Mexico House of Representatives from the 35th district
- Incumbent
- Assumed office January 1, 2017
- Preceded by: Jeff Steinborn

Personal details
- Born: May 30, 1979 (age 47) Lake Arthur, New Mexico, U.S.
- Party: Democratic
- Education: New Mexico State University (BA); California State University, Los Angeles (MA)

Angelica Rubio (born May 30, 1979) is an American politician who has served in the New Mexico House of Representatives from the 35th district since 2017.

== Early life and education ==
Rubio was born and raised in New Mexico by immigrant parents. She earned her undergraduate degree in government from New Mexico State University and a Master of Arts in Latin American Studies from California State University, Los Angeles. Rubio cites Dolores Huerta as an inspiration in how she opened doors for Latina elected officials.

== Career ==
A progressive, Rubio has worked in Las Cruces on issues such as minimum wage, a city council campaign for Kasandra Gandara, and the designation of an Organ Mountains–Desert Peaks National Monument.

Rubio is the chair of the interim Radioactive & Hazardous Materials Committee. She has spoken against the Mexico–United States border wall and voted against allowing New Mexico state land to be used for its construction. Additionally, she introduced the approved House Bill 388, the gender-neutral bathroom bill, requiring New Mexico businesses and public facilities to label single-stall restrooms as gender neutral.
