= Joy Garratt =

American politician (born 1952)

Member of the New Mexico House of Representatives from the 29th district
- Incumbent
- Assumed office January 15, 2019
- Preceded by: David Adkins

Personal details
- Born: April 11, 1952 (age 74) Long Beach, California, U.S.
- Party: Democratic
- Education: Excelsior University (BA); University of New Mexico (MA)

Joy Garratt (born April 11, 1952) is an American politician and educator serving as a member of the New Mexico House of Representatives from the 29th district, which includes portions of Bernalillo County.

== Early life and education ==
Garratt was born in Long Beach, California. She earned a Bachelor of Science degree in communication and history from Excelsior University in Albany, New York and a Master of Arts in educational leadership from the University of New Mexico.

== Career ==
After earning her master's degree, Garratt worked as a social studies teacher in Albuquerque, New Mexico and Pasadena, California. Garratt also worked abroad as an English teacher in South Korea. Garratt defeated incumbent Republican David Adkins in the November 2018 general election for the 29th district of the New Mexico House of Representatives and assumed office on January 15, 2019.
