= 2026 New Mexico House of Representatives election =

- November 3, 2026

All 70 seats in the New Mexico House of Representatives 36 seats needed for a majority

| | Majority party | Minority party |
|---|---|---|
| Leader | Javier Martínez | Rod Montoya |
| Party | Democratic | Republican |
| Leader since | January 17, 2023 | April 5, 2024 |
| Leader's seat | 11th - Albuquerque | 1st - Farmington |
| Seats before | 44 | 26 |
| Seats after | 47 | 23 |
| Seat change | ▲3 | ▼3 |
- Status of the incumbents Democratic incumbent Democratic incumbent retiring Republican incumbent Republican incumbent retiring
Speaker before election
Javier Martínez
Democratic
Elected Speaker
TBD

The 2026 New Mexico House of Representatives election was held on November 3, 2026, alongside the other 2026 United States elections. Voters elected members of the New Mexico House of Representatives in all 70 of the U.S. state of New Mexico's legislative districts to serve a two-year term.

== Retirements ==
=== Democrats ===
1. District 37: Joanne Ferrary is retiring
2. District 41: Susan K. Herrera is retiring
3. District 50: Matthew McQueen is retiring to run for Commissioner of Public Lands.

=== Republicans ===
1. District 59: Mark B. Murphy is retiring.
2. District 63: Martin R. Zamora is retiring.
3. District 66: Jimmy Mason is retiring.

== Incumbents defeated ==
=== In primary elections ===
==== Democrats ====
One Democrat lost re-nomination.

1. District 27: Marian Matthews lost re-nomination to Abby Foster.

== Predictions ==
| Source | Ranking | As of |
|---|---|---|
| Sabato's Crystal Ball | Safe D | January 22, 2026 |
| State Navigate | Safe D | October 24, 2026 |

== Summary of results by district ==
| District | Incumbent | Party | Elected Representative | Outcome |
|---|---|---|---|---|
| 1st | Rod Montoya | Rep | Rod Montoya | Rep |
| 2nd | Mark Duncan | Rep | Mark Duncan | Rep |
| 3rd | Bill Hall | Rep | Bill Hall | Rep |
| 4th | Joseph Franklin Hernandez | Dem | Heather Ellison | Rep |
| 5th | Doreen Wonda Johnson | Dem | Doreen Wonda Johnson | Dem |
| 6th | Martha Garcia | Dem | Martha Garcia | Dem |
| 7th | Tanya Mirabal Moya | Rep | Rickie Gonzales II | Dem |
| 8th | Brian Baca | Rep | Brian Baca | Rep |
| 9th | Patricia Lundstrom | Dem | Patricia Lundstrom | Dem |
| 10th | G. Andrés Romero | Dem | G. Andrés Romero | Dem |
| 11th | Javier Martínez | Dem | Javier Martínez | Dem |
| 12th | Art De La Cruz | Dem | Art De La Cruz | Dem |
| 13th | Patricia Roybal Caballero | Dem | Patricia Roybal Caballero | Dem |
| 14th | Miguel Garcia | Dem | Miguel Garcia | Dem |
| 15th | Dayan Hochman-Vigil | Dem | Dayan Hochman-Vigil | Dem |
| 16th | Yanira Gurrola | Dem | Yanira Gurrola | Dem |
| 17th | Cynthia Borrego | Dem | Cynthia Borrego | Dem |
| 18th | Marianna Anaya | Dem | Marianna Anaya | Dem |
| 19th | Janelle Anyanonu | Dem | Janelle Anyanonu | Dem |
| 20th | Meredith Dixon | Dem | Meredith Dixon | Dem |
| 21st | Debra M. Sariñana | Dem | Debra M. Sariñana | Dem |
| 22nd | Stefani Lord | Rep | Stefani Lord | Rep |
| 23rd | Alan Martinez | Rep | Alan Martinez | Rep |
| 24th | Elizabeth Thomson | Dem | Elizabeth Thomson | Dem |
| 25th | Cristina Parajón | Dem | Cristina Parajón | Dem |
| 26th | Eleanor Chávez | Dem | Eleanor Chávez | Dem |
| 27th | Marian Matthews | Dem | Abby Foster | Dem |
| 28th | Pamelya Herndon | Dem | Pamelya Herndon | Dem |
| 29th | Joy Garratt | Dem | Joy Garratt | Dem |
| 30th | Diane Torres-Velásquez | Dem | Diane Torres-Velásquez | Dem |
| 31st | Nicole Chavez | Rep | Nicole Chavez | Rep |
| 32nd | Jenifer Jones | Rep | Jenifer Jones | Rep |
| 33rd | Micaela Lara Cadena | Dem | Micaela Lara Cadena | Dem |
| 34th | Raymundo Lara | Dem | Raymundo Lara | Dem |
| 35th | Angelica Rubio | Dem | Angelica Rubio | Dem |
| 36th | Nathan Small | Dem | Nathan Small | Dem |
| 37th | Joanne Ferrary | Dem | Lori Martinez | Dem |
| 38th | Rebecca Dow | Rep | David Mooney | Dem |
| 39th | Luis Terrazas | Rep | Raul Turrieta | Dem |
| 40th | Joseph L. Sanchez | Dem | Joseph L. Sanchez | Dem |
| 41st | Susan K. Herrera | Dem | Yolanda Jaramillo | Dem |
| 42nd | Kristina Ortez | Dem | Kristina Ortez | Dem |
| 43rd | Christine Chandler | Dem | Christine Chandler | Dem |
| 44th | Kathleen Cates | Dem | Kathleen Cates | Dem |
| 45th | Linda Serrato | Dem | Linda Serrato | Dem |
| 46th | Andrea Romero | Dem | Andrea Romero | Dem |
| 47th | Reena Szczepanski | Dem | Reena Szczepanski | Dem |
| 48th | Tara Lujan | Dem | Tara Lujan | Dem |
| 49th | Gail Armstrong | Rep | Gail Armstrong | Rep |
| 50th | Matthew McQueen | Dem | Sarah Boses | Dem |
| 51st | John Block | Rep | John Block | Rep |
| 52nd | Doreen Gallegos | Dem | Doreen Gallegos | Dem |
| 53rd | Sarah Silva | Dem | Sarah Silva | Dem |
| 54th | Jonathan Henry | Rep | Jonathan Henry | Rep |
| 55th | Cathrynn Brown | Rep | Cathrynn Brown | Rep |
| 56th | Harlan Vincent | Rep | Harlan Vincent | Rep |
| 57th | Catherine Cullen | Rep | Chriselle Martinez | Dem |
| 58th | Angelita Meija | Rep | Angelita Meija | Rep |
| 59th | Mark Murphy | Rep | Stephen Dodson | Rep |
| 60th | Joshua Hernandez | Rep | Joshua Hernandez | Rep |
| 61st | Randall Pettigrew | Rep | Randall Pettigrew | Rep |
| 62nd | Elaine Sena Cortez | Rep | Elaine Sena Cortez | Rep |
| 63rd | Martin R. Zamora | Rep | Seth Martin | Rep |
| 64th | Andrea Reeb | Rep | Andrea Reeb | Rep |
| 65th | Derrick J. Lente | Dem | Derrick J. Lente | Dem |
| 66th | Jimmy Mason | Rep | Leanne Gandy | Rep |
| 67th | Jack Chatfield | Rep | Jack Chatfield | Rep |
| 68th | Charlotte Little | Dem | Charlotte Little | Dem |
| 69th | Michelle Paulene Abeyta | Dem | Michelle Paulene Abeyta | Dem |
| 70th | Anita Gonzales | Dem | Anita Gonzales | Dem |

== Partisan background ==
In the 2024 U.S. presidential election, Democratic nominee Kamala Harris won the most votes in 46 of New Mexico's state house districts and Republican nominee Donald Trump won 24. Two districts, 31 and 39, simultaneously cast more votes for Kamala Harris and elected Republican state representatives at the 2024 state house election.

Harris (D) 40–50% 50–60% 60–70% 70–80% 80–90% / Trump (R) 40–50% 50–60% 60–70% 70–80% 80–90%

== District 1 ==
The 1st district is represented by Republican Rod Montoya, who is running for re-election.

=== Republican primary ===
==== Nominee ====
- Rod Montoya, incumbent state representative

== District 2 ==
The 2nd district is represented by Republican Mark Duncan, who is running for re-election.

=== Republican primary ===
==== Nominee ====
- Mark Duncan, incumbent state representative

== District 3 ==
The 3rd district is represented by Republican Bill Hall, who is running for re-election.

=== Republican primary ===
==== Nominee ====
- Bill Hall, incumbent state representative

== District 4 ==
The 4th district is represented by Democrat Joseph Franklin Hernandez, who is running for re-election.

=== Democratic primary ===
==== Nominee ====
- Joseph Franklin Hernandez, incumbent state representative

==== Eliminated in primary ====
- Christina J. Aspaas

==== Endorsements ====
Joseph Franklin Hernandez

Organizations

- New Mexico Working Families Party

=== Republican primary ===
==== Nominee ====
- Heather Scott Ellison

== District 5 ==
The 5th district is represented by Democrat Doreen Wonda Johnson, who is running for re-election.

=== Democratic primary ===
==== Nominee ====
- Doreen Wonda Johnson, incumbent state representative

== District 6 ==
The 6th district is represented by Democrat Martha Garcia, who is running for re-election.

=== Democratic primary ===
==== Declared ====
- Martha Garcia, incumbent state representative

==== Eliminated in primary ====
- Priscilla Benally
- David L Alcon
- Johnny Valdez

==== Disqualified ====
- Leonardo J Torrez

=== Republican primary ===
==== Nominee ====
- Paul L. Spencer

== District 7 ==
The 7th district is represented by Republican Tanya Mirabal Moya, who is running for re-election.

=== Republican primary ===
==== Nominee ====
- Tanya Mirabal Moya, incumbent state representative

=== Democratic primary ===
==== Nominee ====
- Rickie Allen Gonzales II

== District 8 ==
The 8th district is represented by Republican Brian Baca, who is running for re-election.

=== Republican primary ===
==== Nominee ====
- Brian Baca, incumbent state representative

=== Democratic primary ===
==== Nominee ====
- Katherine Joanna Gauer

== District 9 ==
The 9th district is represented by Democrat Patricia Lundstrom, who is running for re-election.

=== Democratic primary ===
==== Nominee ====
- Patricia Lundstrom, incumbent state representative

==== Disqualified ====
- Brandy N. Laughter

== District 10 ==
The 10th district is represented by Democrat G. Andrés Romero, who is running for re-election.

=== Democratic primary ===
==== Nominee ====
- G. Andrés Romero, incumbent state representative

=== Republican primary ===
==== Nominee ====
- Christopher P. Crane

== District 11 ==
The 11th district is represented by Democrat Javier Martínez, who is running for re-election.

=== Democratic primary ===
==== Nominee ====
- Javier Martínez, incumbent state representative

== District 12 ==
The 12th district is represented by Democrat Art De La Cruz, who is running for re-election.

=== Democratic primary ===
==== Nominee ====
- Art De La Cruz, incumbent state representative

=== Republican primary ===
==== Nominee ====
- Steven E. Tafoya

== District 13 ==
The 13th district is represented by Democrat Patricia Roybal Caballero, who is running for re-election.

=== Nominee ===
- Patricia Roybal Caballero, incumbent state representative

==== Eliminated in primary ====
- Matthew E. Archuleta

==== Endorsements ====
Patricia Roybal Caballero

Organizations

- New Mexico Working Families Party

== District 14 ==
The 14th district is represented by Democrat Miguel Garcia, who is running for re-election.

=== Nominee ===
- Miguel Garcia, incumbent state representative

==== Eliminated in primary ====
- Joseph M. Romero

==== Endorsements ====
Miguel Garcia

Organizations

- New Mexico Working Families Party

=== Republican primary ===
==== Nominee ====
- Richard Victor Zubia

== District 15 ==
The 15th district is represented by Democrat Dayan Hochman-Vigil, who is running for re-election.

=== Democratic primary ===
==== Nominee ====
- Dayan Hochman-Vigil, incumbent state representative

== District 16 ==
The 16th district is represented by Democrat Yanira Gurrola, who is running for re-election.

=== Democratic primary ===
==== Nominee ====
- Yanira Gurrola, incumbent state representative

==== Eliminated in primary ====
- Marsella Duarte Serna

==== Endorsements ====
Yanira Gurrola

Organizations

- New Mexico Working Families Party

== District 17 ==
The 17th district is represented by Democrat Cynthia Borrego, who is running for re-election.

=== Democratic primary ===
==== Nominee ====
- Cynthia Borrego, incumbent state representative

=== Republican primary ===
==== Nominee ====
- Stacey Deanne Rich

== District 18 ==
The 18th district is represented by Democrat Marianna Anaya, who is running for re-election.

=== Democratic primary ===
==== Nominee ====
- Marianna Anaya, incumbent state representative

== District 19 ==
The 19th district is represented by Democrat Janelle Anyanonu, who is running for re-election.

=== Democratic primary ===
==== Nominee ====
- Janelle Anyanonu, incumbent state representative

== District 20 ==
The 20th district is represented by Democrat Meredith Dixon, who is running for re-election.

=== Democratic primary ===
==== Nominee ====
- Meredith Dixon, incumbent state representative

== District 21 ==
The 21st district is represented by Democrat Debra M. Sariñana, who is running for re-election.

=== Democratic primary ===
==== Nominee ====
- Debra M. Sariñana, incumbent state representative

=== Republican primary ===
==== Nominee ====
- Robert L. Mason

=== Independent candidates ===
- Zach Withers

== District 22 ==
The 22nd district is represented by Republican Stefani Lord, who is running for re-election.

=== Republican primary ===
==== Nominee ====
- Stefani Lord, incumbent state representative

=== Democratic primary ===
==== Nominee ====
- Bill Scott

== District 23 ==
The 23rd district is represented by Republican Alan Martinez, who is running for re-election.

=== Republican primary ===
==== Nominee ====
- Alan Martinez, incumbent state representative

=== Democratic primary ===
==== Withdrawn ====
- Elise Falanga Taylor

== District 24 ==
The 24th district is represented by Democrat Elizabeth Thomson, who is running for re-election.

=== Democratic primary ===
==== Nominee ====
- Elizabeth Thomson, incumbent state representative

==== Disqualified ====
- Frankie Byron Santos Mcquerry

== District 25 ==
The 25th district is represented by Democrat Cristina Parajón, who is running for re-election.

=== Democratic primary ===
==== Nominee ====
- Cristina Parajón, incumbent state representative

=== Republican primary ===
==== Nominee ====
- Denis Litvinenko

== District 26 ==
The 26th district is represented by Democrat Eleanor Chávez, who is running for re-election.

=== Democratic primary ===
==== Nominee ====
- Eleanor Chávez, incumbent state representative

=== Republican primary ===
==== Nominee ====
- Corey Rubin Zimmerman

== District 27 ==
The 27th district is represented by Democrat Marian Matthews, who is running for re-election.

=== Democratic primary ===
==== Nominee ====
- Abby Foster

==== Eliminated in primary ====
- Marian Matthews, incumbent state representative

==== Endorsements ====
Abby Foster

Organizations

- New Mexico Working Families Party

=== Republican primary ===
==== Declared ====
- Jahnelle Louise Garcia
- Robert S. Godshall

== District 28 ==
The 28th district is represented by Democrat Pamelya Herndon, who is running for re-election.

=== Democratic primary ===
==== Nominee ====
- Pamelya Herndon, incumbent state representative

=== Republican primary ===
==== Nominee ====
- Brenda J. Olson

== District 29 ==
The 29th district is represented by Democrat Joy Garratt, who is running for re-election.

=== Democratic primary ===
==== Nominee ====
- Joy Garratt, incumbent state representative

=== Republican primary ===
==== Nominee ====
- Carolyn Stith

== District 30 ==
The 30th district is represented by Democrat Diane Torres-Velásquez, who is running for re-election.

=== Democratic primary ===
==== Nominee ====
- Diane Torres-Velásquez, incumbent state representative

==== Eliminated in primary ====
- Veronica Nadine Mireles

==== Endorsements ====
Diane Torres-Velásquez

Organizations

- New Mexico Working Families Party

=== Republican primary ===
==== Nominee ====
- Jerry L. Trujillo

== District 31 ==
The 31st district is represented by Republican Nicole Chavez, who is running for re-election.

=== Republican primary ===
==== Nominee ====
- Nicole Chavez, incumbent state representative

=== Democratic primary ===
==== Nominee ====
- Ryan Anselm Braid

== District 32 ==
The 32nd district is represented by Republican Jenifer Jones, who is running for re-election.

=== Republican primary ===
==== Nominee ====
- Jenifer Jones, incumbent state representative

=== Democratic primary ===
==== Nominee ====
- Laura Mairel Parra

== District 33 ==
The 33rd district is represented by Democrat Micaela Lara Cadena, who is running for re-election.

=== Democratic primary ===
==== Nominee ====
- Micaela Lara Cadena, incumbent state representative

==== Eliminated in primary ====
- Ramona J. Martinez

==== Endorsements ====
Micaela Lara Cadena

Organizations

- New Mexico Working Families Party

=== Republican primary ===
==== Nominee ====
- Enrique Kiki Vigil

== District 34 ==
The 34th district is represented by Democrat Raymundo Lara, who is running for re-election.

=== Democratic primary ===
==== Nominee ====
- Raymundo Lara, incumbent state representative

==== Eliminated in primary ====
- Juan A. Fuentes

== District 35 ==
The 35th district is represented by Democrat Angelica Rubio, who is running for re-election.

=== Democratic primary ===
==== Nominee ====
- Angelica Rubio, incumbent state representative

== District 36 ==
The 36th district is represented by Democrat Nathan Small, who is running for re-election.

=== Democratic primary ===
==== Nominee ====
- Nathan Small, incumbent state representative

=== Republican primary ===
==== Nominee ====
- Julia E. Ruiz

== District 37 ==
The 37th district is represented by Democrat Joanne Ferrary, who is retiring.

=== Democratic primary ===
==== Nominee ====
- Lori A. Martinez

==== Eliminated in primary ====
- Tilli Villalobos

==== Declined ====
- Joanne Ferrary, incumbent state representative

==== Endorsements ====
Lori A. Martinez

Organizations

- New Mexico Working Families Party
Tilli Villalobos
- New Mexico Forward Party

=== Republican primary ===
==== Nominee ====
- Isabella Solis

== District 38 ==
The 38th district is represented by Republican Rebecca Dow, who is running for re-election.

=== Republican primary ===
==== Nominee ====
- Rebecca Dow, incumbent state representative

=== Democratic primary ===
==== Nominee ====
- David L. Mooney

== District 39 ==
The 39th district is represented by Republican Luis Terrazas, who is running for re-election.

=== Republican primary ===
==== Nominee ====
- Luis Terrazas, incumbent state representative

=== Democratic primary ===
==== Nominee ====
- Raul S. Turrieta

== District 40 ==
The 40th district is represented by Democrat Joseph Sanchez, who is running for re-election.

=== Democratic primary ===
==== Declared ====
- Joseph Sanchez, incumbent state representative

==== Eliminated in primary ====
- Nancy J. Wright

==== Endorsements ====
Nancy J. Wright

Organizations

- New Mexico Working Families Party

=== Republican primary ===
==== Nominee ====
- Landon McGuire Dooley

== District 41 ==
The 41st district is represented by Democrat Susan K. Herrera, who is retiring.

=== Democratic primary ===
==== Nominee ====
- Yolanda "Pancho" Jaramillo, former school teacher

==== Eliminated in primary ====
- Debbie Rodella, former state representative from this district (1993–2019)

==== Declined ====
- Susan K. Herrera, incumbent state representative since 2019 (endorsed Pancho Jaramillo)

==== Endorsements ====
Pancho Jaramillo
- Susan K. Herrera, incumbent state representative since 2019

Organizations

- New Mexico Working Families Party

== District 42 ==
The 42nd district is represented by Democrat Kristina Ortez, who is running for re-election.

=== Democratic primary ===
==== Nominee ====
- Kristina Ortez, incumbent state representative

== District 43 ==
The 43rd district is represented by Democrat Christine Chandler, who is running for re-election.

=== Democratic primary ===
==== Nominee ====
- Christine Chandler, incumbent state representative

== District 44 ==
The 44th district is represented by Democrat Kathleen Cates, who is running for re-election.

=== Democratic primary ===
==== Nominee ====
- Kathleen Cates, incumbent state representative

==== Endorsements ====
Kathleen Cates (D)
- New Mexico Forward Party

=== Republican primary ===
==== Candidates ====
===== Nominee =====
- Adam Stanley Prior

===== Withdrawn =====
- Raul R. Vigil

== District 45 ==
The 45th district is represented by Democrat Linda Serrato, who is running for re-election.

=== Democratic primary ===
==== Nominee ====
- Linda Serrato, incumbent state representative

== District 46 ==
The 46th district is represented by Democrat Andrea Romero, who is running for re-election.

=== Democratic primary ===
==== Nominee ====
- Andrea Romero, incumbent state representative

== District 47 ==
The 47th district is represented by Democrat Reena Szczepanski, who is running for re-election.

=== Democratic primary ===
==== Nominee ====
- Reena Szczepanski, incumbent state representative

== District 48 ==
The 48th district is represented by Democrat Tara Lujan, who is running for re-election.

=== Democratic primary ===
==== Nominee ====
- Tara Lujan, incumbent state representative

=== Republican primary ===
==== Nominee ====
- Victoria May Garcia

== District 49 ==
The 49th district is represented by Republican Gail Armstrong, who is running for re-election.

=== Republican primary ===
==== Nominee ====
- Gail Armstrong, incumbent state representative since 2017

== District 50 ==
The 50th district is represented by Democrat Matthew McQueen, who is retiring to run for Commissioner of Public Lands.

=== Democratic primary ===
==== Nominee ====
- Sarah Boses

==== Declined ====
- Matthew McQueen, incumbent state representative since 2015 (running for Commissioner of Public Lands)

=== Republican primary ===
==== Nominee ====
- Kenneth Donald Brennan

== District 51 ==
The 51st district is represented by Republican John Block, who is running for re-election.

=== Republican primary ===
==== Nominee ====
- John Block, incumbent state representative since 2023

=== Independent candidates ===
- Zach Withers

== District 52 ==
The 52nd district is represented by Democrat Doreen Gallegos, who is running for re-election.

=== Democratic primary ===
==== Nominee ====
- Doreen Gallegos, incumbent state representative since 2013

== District 53 ==
The 53rd district is represented by Democrat Sarah Silva, who is running for re-election.

=== Democratic primary ===
==== Nominee ====
- Sarah Silva, incumbent state representative since 2025

=== Republican primary ===
==== Nominee ====
- Ben Luna Jr.

== District 54 ==
The 54th district is represented by Republican Jonathan Henry, who is running for re-election.

=== Republican primary ===
==== Nominee ====
- Jonathan Henry, incumbent state representative since 2025

== District 55 ==
The 55th district is represented by Republican Cathrynn Brown, who is running for re-election.

=== Republican primary ===
==== Nominee ====
- Cathrynn Brown, incumbent state representative since 2011

== District 56 ==
The 56th district is represented by Republican Harlan Vincent, who is running for re-election.

=== Republican primary ===
==== Nominee ====
- Harlan Vincent, incumbent state representative since 2023

== District 57 ==
The 57th district is represented by Republican Catherine Cullen, who is running for re-election.

=== Republican primary ===
==== Nominee ====
- Catherine Cullen, incumbent state representative since 2025

=== Democratic primary ===
==== Nominee ====
- Chriselle Verene Martinez

== District 58 ==
The 58th district is represented by Republican Angelita Meija, who is running for re-election.

=== Republican primary ===
==== Nominee ====
- Angelita Mejia, incumbent state representative since 2025

== District 59 ==
The 59th district is represented by Republican Mark B. Murphy, who initially sought re-election but withdrew.

=== Republican primary ===
==== Candidates ====
===== Nominee =====
- Stephen Ryan Dodson

===== Withdrawn =====
- Mark B. Murphy, incumbent state representative since 2025

== District 60 ==
The 60th district is represented by Republican Joshua Hernandez, who is running for re-election.

=== Republican primary ===
==== Nominee ====
- Joshua Hernandez, incumbent state representative since 2021

==== Eliminated in primary ====
- Zachary David Anaya

=== Democratic primary ===
==== Nominee ====
- Luke Nicholas Jungmann

== District 61 ==
The 61st district is represented by Republican Randall Pettigrew, who is running for re-election.

=== Republican primary ===
==== Nominee ====
- Randall Pettigrew, incumbent state representative since 2021

== District 62 ==
The 62nd district is represented by Republican Elaine Sena Cortez, who is running for re-election.

=== Republican primary ===
==== Nominee ====
- Elaine Sena Cortez, incumbent state representative since 2025

== District 63 ==
The 63rd district is represented by Republican Martin R. Zamora, who is retiring.

=== Republican primary ===
==== Candidates ====
===== Nominee =====
- Seth H. Martin

===== Declined =====
- Martin R. Zamora, incumbent state representative since 2019 (running for New Mexico's 3rd congressional district)

== District 64 ==
The 64th district is represented by Republican Andrea Reeb, who is running for re-election.

=== Republican primary ===
==== Nominee ====
- Andrea Reeb, incumbent state representative since 2023

== District 65 ==
The 65th district is represented by Democrat Derrick Lente, who is running for re-election.

=== Democratic primary ===
==== Nominee ====
- Derrick Lente, incumbent state representative since 2017

== District 66 ==
The 66th district is represented by Republican Jimmy Mason, who is retiring.

=== Republican primary ===
==== Nominee ====
- Leanne Gandy

==== Eliminated in primary ====
- Dan S. Lewis
- Trinidad Malone

===== Declined =====
- Jimmy Mason, incumbent state representative since 2023

== District 67 ==
The 67th district is represented by Republican Jack Chatfield, who is running for re-election.

=== Republican primary ===
==== Nominee ====
- Jack Chatfield, incumbent state representative since 2019

=== Democratic primary ===
==== Nominee ====
- Vincent M. Soule

== District 68 ==
The 68th district is represented by Democrat Charlotte Little, who is running for re-election.

=== Democratic primary ===
==== Nominee ====
- Charlotte Little, incumbent state representative since 2023

=== Republican primary ===
==== Nominee ====
- David E. Adkins

== District 69 ==
The 69th district is represented by Democrat Michelle Paulene Abeyta, who is running for re-election.

=== Democratic primary ===
==== Nominee ====
- Michelle Paulene Abeyta, incumbent state representative since 2025

==== Eliminated in primary ====
- Harry Garcia, former state representative for this district (2016-2024)

==== Endorsements ====
Michelle ‘Paulene’ Abeyta

Organizations

- New Mexico Working Families Party

== District 70 ==
The 70th district is represented by Democrat Anita Gonzales, who is running for re-election.

=== Democratic primary ===
==== Nominee ====
- Anita Gonzales, incumbent state representative since 2025

==== Eliminated in primary ====
- Ambrose M. Castellano, former state representative for this district (2021-2024)

==== Endorsements ====
Anita Gonzales

Organizations

- New Mexico Working Families Party
