= 2024 New Mexico House of Representatives election =

- November 5, 2024

All 70 seats in the New Mexico House of Representatives 36 seats needed for a majority

	Majority party	Minority party
Leader	Javier Martínez	Rod Montoya
Party	Democratic	Republican
Leader since	January 17, 2023	April 5, 2024
Leader's seat	11th - Albuquerque	1st - Farmington
Seats before	45	25
Seats after	44	26
Seat change	▼1	▲1
Popular vote	421,033	349,661
Percentage	54.40%	45.18%
Swing	▼1.63%	▲3.16%
- Results: Republican gain Democratic hold Republican hold
Speaker before election
Javier Martínez
Democratic
Elected Speaker
Javier Martínez
Democratic

The 2024 New Mexico House of Representatives election was held on November 5, 2024, alongside the 2024 United States elections.

== Predictions ==
Source	Ranking	As of
CNalysis	Solid D	June 13, 2024

== Results summary ==
District	Incumbent	Party	Elected representative	Party
1	Rod Montoya	Rep	Rod Montoya	Rep
2	Mark Duncan	Rep	Mark Duncan	Rep
3	Bill Hall	Rep	Bill Hall	Rep
4	Anthony Allison†	Dem	Joseph Franklin Hernandez	Dem
5	Doreen Wonda Johnson	Dem	Doreen Wonda Johnson	Dem
6	Eliseo Alcon	Dem	Eliseo Alcon	Dem
7	Tanya Mirabal Moya	Rep	Tanya Mirabal Moya	Rep
8	Brian Baca	Rep	Brian Baca	Rep
9	Patricia Lundstrom	Dem	Patricia Lundstrom	Dem
10	Andrés Romero	Dem	Andrés Romero	Dem
11	Javier Martínez	Dem	Javier Martínez	Dem
12	Art De La Cruz	Dem	Art De La Cruz	Dem
13	Patricia Roybal Caballero	Dem	Patricia Roybal Caballero	Dem
14	Miguel Garcia	Dem	Miguel Garcia	Dem
15	Dayan Hochman-Vigil	Dem	Dayan Hochman-Vigil	Dem
16	Yanira Gurrola	Dem	Yanira Gurrola	Dem
17	Cynthia Borrego	Dem	Cynthia Borrego	Dem
18	Gail Chasey†	Dem	Marianna Anaya	Dem
19	Janelle Anyanonu	Dem	Janelle Anyanonu	Dem
20	Meredith Dixon	Dem	Meredith Dixon	Dem
21	Debra M. Sariñana	Dem	Debra M. Sariñana	Dem
22	Stefani Lord	Rep	Stefani Lord	Rep
23	Alan Martinez	Rep	Alan Martinez	Rep
24	Liz Thomson	Dem	Liz Thomson	Dem
25	Cristina Parajón	Dem	Cristina Parajón	Dem
26	Eleanor Chavez	Dem	Eleanor Chavez	Dem
27	Marian Matthews	Dem	Marian Matthews	Dem
28	Pamelya Herndon	Dem	Pamelya Herndon	Dem
29	Joy Garratt	Dem	Joy Garratt	Dem
30	Natalie Figueroa†	Dem	Diane Torres-Velásquez	Dem
31	Bill Rehm†	Rep	Nicole Chavez	Rep
32	Jenifer Jones	Rep	Jenifer Jones	Rep
33	Micaela Lara Cadena	Dem	Micaela Lara Cadena	Dem
34	Raymundo Lara	Dem	Raymundo Lara	Dem
35	Angelica Rubio	Dem	Angelica Rubio	Dem
36	Nathan Small	Dem	Nathan Small	Dem
37	Joanne Ferrary	Dem	Joanne Ferrary	Dem
38	Tara Jaramillo	Dem	Rebecca Dow	Rep
39	Luis Terrazas	Rep	Luis Terrazas	Rep
40	Joseph L. Sanchez	Dem	Joseph L. Sanchez	Dem
41	Susan K. Herrera	Dem	Susan K. Herrera	Dem
42	Kristina Ortez	Dem	Kristina Ortez	Dem
43	Christine Chandler	Dem	Christine Chandler	Dem
44	Kathleen Cates	Dem	Kathleen Cates	Dem
45	Linda Serrato	Dem	Linda Serrato	Dem
46	Andrea Romero	Dem	Andrea Romero	Dem
47	Reena Szczepanski	Dem	Reena Szczepanski	Dem
48	Tara Lujan	Dem	Tara Lujan	Dem
49	Gail Armstrong	Rep	Gail Armstrong	Rep
50	Matthew McQueen	Dem	Matthew McQueen	Dem
51	John Block	Rep	John Block	Rep
52	Doreen Gallegos	Dem	Doreen Gallegos	Dem
53	Willie D. Madrid	Dem	Sarah Silva	Dem
54	James G. Townsend†	Rep	Jonathan Henry	Rep
55	Cathrynn Brown	Rep	Cathrynn Brown	Rep
56	Harlan Vincent	Rep	Harlan Vincent	Rep
57	Jason Harper†	Rep	Catherine Cullen	Rep
58	Candy Ezzell†	Rep	Angelita Meija	Rep
59	Jared Hembree	Rep	Jared Hembree	Rep
60	Joshua Hernandez	Rep	Joshua Hernandez	Rep
61	Randall Pettigrew	Rep	Randall Pettigrew	Rep
62	Larry Scott†	Rep	Elaine Sena Cortez	Rep
63	Martin R. Zamora	Rep	Martin R. Zamora	Rep
64	Andrea Reeb	Rep	Andrea Reeb	Rep
65	Derrick Lente	Dem	Derrick Lente	Dem
66	Jimmy Mason	Rep	Jimmy Mason	Rep
67	Jackie Chatfield	Rep	Jackie Chatfield	Rep
68	Charlotte Little	Dem	Charlotte Little	Dem
69	Harry Garcia	Dem	Michelle Abeyta	Dem
70	Ambrose Castellano	Dem	Anita Gonzales	Dem

† - Incumbent not seeking re-election

Party	Candi- dates	Votes		Seats		
Party	Candi- dates	No.	%	No.	+/–	%
Democratic	52	421,033	54.40	45	▼1	62.86
Republican	48	349,661	45.18	25	▲1	37.14
Libertarian	1	1,678	0.22	0	Steady	0.00
Independent	1	1,620	0.21	0	Steady	0.00
Total	102	773,992	100%	70	Steady	100%

House seats
Democratic	62.86%
Republican	37.14%

Popular vote
Democratic	54.40%
Republican	45.18%
Libertarian	0.22%
Independent	0.21%

== Retiring incumbents ==
=== Democrats ===
1. District 4: Anthony Allison retired.
2. District 18: Gail Chasey retired.
3. District 30: Natalie Figueroa retired to run for State Senate.

=== Republicans ===
1. District 31: Bill Rehm retired.
2. District 54: James G. Townsend retired to run for State Senate.
3. District 57: Jason Harper retired.
4. District 58: Candy Ezzell retired to run for State Senate.
5. District 62: Larry R. Scott retired to run for State Senate.

== Defeated incumbents ==
=== Defeated in the primary ===
Three incumbents (all Democrats) were defeated for renomination.

1. District 53: Willie D. Madrid lost renomination to Jon Hill.
2. District 69: Harry Garcia lost renomination to Michelle Abeyta.
3. District 70: Ambrose Castellano lost renomination to Anita Gonzales.

=== Defeated in the general election ===
One Democratic incumbent was defeated in the November election.

1. District 38: Tara Jaramillo was defeated by Rebecca Dow (R)

== Detailed results ==
Source for primary election results:

Source for general election results:

=== District 1 ===
Incumbent Republican Rod Montoya had represented the 1st district since 2015.

Republican primary

New Mexico House of Representatives 1st District Republican primary election, 2024
Party	Candidate	Votes	%
Republican	Rod Montoya (incumbent)	1,833	66
Republican	Keith Neil	964	34
Total votes		2,797	100.0

General election

New Mexico House of Representatives 1st District general election, 2024
Party	Candidate	Votes	%
Republican	Rod Montoya (incumbent)	11,369	100.0
Total votes		11,369	100.0
Republican hold			

=== District 2 ===
Incumbent Republican Mark Duncan had represented the 2nd district since 2023.

New Mexico House of Representatives 2nd District general election, 2024
Party	Candidate	Votes	%
Republican	Mark Duncan (incumbent)	8,610	100.0
Total votes		8,610	100.0
Republican hold			

=== District 3 ===
Incumbent Republican Bill Hall had represented the 3rd district since 2024.

New Mexico House of Representatives 3rd District general election, 2024
Party	Candidate	Votes	%
Republican	Bill Hall (incumbent)	10,332	100.0
Total votes		10,332	100.0
Republican hold			

=== District 4 ===
Incumbent Democrat Anthony Allison had represented the 4th district since 2019. Allison did not seek re-election.

Democratic primary

New Mexico House of Representatives 4th District Democratic primary election, 2024
Party	Candidate	Votes	%
Democratic	Joesph Hernandez	550	51
Democratic	Christina Aspaas	358	33
Democratic	Cheryl George	174	16
Total votes		1,082	100.0

General election

New Mexico House of Representatives 4th District general election, 2024
Party	Candidate	Votes	%
Democratic	Joseph Hernandez	5,664	56
Republican	Lincoln Mark	4,500	44
Total votes		10,164	100.0

=== District 5 ===
New Mexico's 5th House District general election, 2024
Party	Candidate	Votes	%
Democratic	Doreen Wonda Johnson (incumbent)	8,810	100.0
Total votes		8,810	100.0

=== District 6 ===
New Mexico's 6th House District general election, 2024
Party	Candidate	Votes	%
Democratic	Eliseo Alcon (incumbent)	5,946	59
Republican	Paul L Spencer	4,156	41
Total votes		10,102	100.0

=== District 7 ===
New Mexico's 7th House District general election, 2024
Party	Candidate	Votes	%
Republican	Tanya Mirabal Moya (incumbent)	7,789	100.0
Total votes		7,789	100.0

=== District 8 ===
New Mexico's 8th House District general election, 2024
Party	Candidate	Votes	%
Republican	Brian Baca (incumbent)	11,123	100.0
Total votes		11,123	100.0

=== District 9 ===
New Mexico's 9th House District general election, 2024
Party	Candidate	Votes	%
Democratic	Patricia Lundstrom (incumbent)	7,019	100.0
Total votes		7,019	100.0

=== District 10 ===
New Mexico's 10th House District general election, 2024
Party	Candidate	Votes	%
Democratic	G. Andrés Romero (incumbent)	6,767	100.0
Total votes		6,767	100.0

=== District 11 ===
New Mexico's 11th House District general election, 2024
Party	Candidate	Votes	%
Democratic	Javier Martínez (incumbent)	10,071	75
Republican	Bart H Kinney III	3,410	25
Total votes		13,481	100.0

=== District 12 ===
New Mexico's 12th House District general election, 2024
Party	Candidate	Votes	%
Democratic	Art De La Cruz (incumbent)	5,736	
Total votes		5,736	100.0

=== District 13 ===
New Mexico's 13th House District general election, 2024
Party	Candidate	Votes	%
Democratic	Patricia Roybal Caballero (incumbent)	5,817	100.0
Total votes		5,817	100.0

=== District 14 ===
New Mexico's 14th House District general election, 2024
Party	Candidate	Votes	%
Democratic	Miguel Garcia (incumbent)	7,310	78
Republican	Konnie L. Legried	2,868	28
Total votes		10,178	100.0

=== District 15 ===
New Mexico's 15th House District general election, 2024
Party	Candidate	Votes	%
Democratic	Dayan Hochman-Vigil (incumbent)	10,232	100.0
Total votes		10,232	100.0

=== District 16 ===
New Mexico's 16th House District general election, 2024
Party	Candidate	Votes	%
Democratic	Yanira Gurrola (incumbent)	8,005	59
Republican	Leland Benwood H. Bohannon	5,545	41
Total votes		13,550	100.0

=== District 17 ===
New Mexico's 17th House District general election, 2024
Party	Candidate	Votes	%
Democratic	Cynthia Borrego (incumbent)	7,860	54
Republican	Joshua Taylor Neal	6,679	46
Total votes		14,539	100.0

=== District 18 ===
New Mexico's 18th House District general election, 2024
Party	Candidate	Votes	%
Democratic	Marianna Anaya	11,668	100.0
Total votes		11,668	100.0

=== District 19 ===
New Mexico's 19th House District general election, 2024
Party	Candidate	Votes	%
Democratic	Janelle Anyanonu (incumbent)	5,626	72
Republican	Leanna K. Derrick	2,208	28
Total votes		7,834	100.0

=== District 20 ===
New Mexico's 20th House District general election, 2024
Party	Candidate	Votes	%
Democratic	Meredith Dixon (incumbent)	8,227	56
Republican	Tracy Major	6,498	44
Total votes		14,725	100.0

=== District 21 ===
New Mexico's 21st House District general election, 2024
Party	Candidate	Votes	%
Democratic	Debra M. Sariñana (incumbent)	6,850	100.0
Total votes		6,850	100.0

=== District 22 ===
New Mexico's 22nd House District general election, 2024
Party	Candidate	Votes	%
Republican	Stefani Lord (incumbent)	10,476	56
Democratic	Fred Ponzlov	6,486	35
Independent	Zachary P. Withers	1,620	9
Total votes		18,582	100.0

=== District 23 ===
New Mexico's 23rd House District general election, 2024
Party	Candidate	Votes	%
Republican	Alan Martinez (incumbent)	9,199	55
Democratic	Frank James Smith Jr.	7,678	45
Total votes		16,877	100.0

=== District 24 ===
New Mexico's 24th House District general election, 2024
Party	Candidate	Votes	%
Democratic	Elizabeth Thomson (incumbent)	9,141	60
Republican	David J. Daffron	6,222	40
Total votes		15,363	100.0

=== District 25 ===
New Mexico's 25th House District general election, 2024
Party	Candidate	Votes	%
Democratic	Cristina Parajón (incumbent)	10,022	69
Republican	Denis Litvinenko	4,555	31
Total votes		14,577	100.0

=== District 26 ===
New Mexico's 26th House District general election, 2024
Party	Candidate	Votes	%
Democratic	Eleanor Chavez (incumbent)	5,438	58
Republican	Patrick B. Sais	3,900	42
Total votes		9,338	100.0

=== District 27 ===
New Mexico's 27th House District general election, 2024
Party	Candidate	Votes	%
Democratic	Marian Matthews (incumbent)	9,000	54
Republican	Gregory R. Gallegos	7,731	46
Total votes		16,731	100.0

=== District 28 ===
New Mexico's 28th House District general election, 2024
Party	Candidate	Votes	%
Democratic	Pamelya Herndon (incumbent)	9,403	56
Republican	Marcie M. May	7,406	44
Total votes		16,809	100.0

=== District 29 ===
New Mexico's 29th House District general election, 2024
Party	Candidate	Votes	%
Democratic	Joy Garratt (incumbent)	9,536	54
Republican	Gregory G. Cunningham	8,088	46
Total votes		17,624	100.0

=== District 30 ===
New Mexico's 30th House District general election, 2024
Party	Candidate	Votes	%
Democratic	Diane Torres-Velásquez	7,987	54
Republican	Lori Lee Robertson	6,766	46
Total votes		14,753	100.0

=== District 31 ===
New Mexico's 31st House District general election, 2024
Party	Candidate	Votes	%
Republican	Nicole Chavez (incumbent)	9,597	52
Democratic	Vicky G. Estrada-Bustillo	8,754	48
Total votes		18,351	100.0

=== District 32 ===
New Mexico's 32nd House District general election, 2024
Party	Candidate	Votes	%
Republican	Jenifer Jones (incumbent)	6,026	61
Democratic	Linda S. Alvarez	3,801	39
Total votes		9,827	100.0

=== District 33 ===
New Mexico's 33rd House District general election, 2024
Party	Candidate	Votes	%
Democratic	Micaela Lara Cadena (incumbent)	8,096	100.0
Total votes		8,096	100.0

=== District 34 ===
New Mexico's 34th House District general election, 2024
Party	Candidate	Votes	%
Democratic	Raymundo Lara (incumbent)	5,081	58
Republican	Larry M. Sedillo	3,720	42
Total votes		8,801	100.0

=== District 35 ===
New Mexico's 35th House District general election, 2024
Party	Candidate	Votes	%
Democratic	Angelica Rubio (incumbent)	8,345	100.0
Total votes		8,345	100.0

=== District 36 ===
New Mexico's 36th House District general election, 2024
Party	Candidate	Votes	%
Democratic	Nathan Small (incumbent)	7,394	52
Republican	Kimberly Skaggs	6,850	48
Total votes		14,244	100.0

=== District 37 ===
New Mexico's 37th House District general election, 2024
Party	Candidate	Votes	%
Democratic	Joanne Ferrary (incumbent)	9,479	100.0
Total votes		9,479	100.0

=== District 38 ===
New Mexico's 38th House District general election, 2024
Party	Candidate	Votes	%
Republican	Rebecca Dow	6,046	52
Democratic	Tara Jaramillo (incumbent)	5,664	48
Total votes		11,710	100.0

=== District 39 ===
New Mexico's 39th House District general election, 2024
Party	Candidate	Votes	%
Republican	Luis Terrazas (incumbent)	7,777	54
Democratic	Gabrielle Begay	6,755	46
Total votes		14,532	100.0

=== District 40 ===
New Mexico's 40th House District general election, 2024
Party	Candidate	Votes	%
Democratic	Joseph L. Sanchez (incumbent)	8,012	61
Republican	Diego Olivas	5,130	39
Total votes		13,142	100.0

=== District 41 ===
New Mexico's 41st House District general election, 2024
Party	Candidate	Votes	%
Democratic	Susan K. Herrera (incumbent)	8,756	100.0
Total votes		8,756	100.0

=== District 42 ===
New Mexico's 42nd House District general election, 2024
Party	Candidate	Votes	%
Democratic	Kristina Ortez (incumbent)	11,140	100.0
Total votes		11,140	100.0

=== District 43 ===
New Mexico's 43rd House District general election, 2024
Party	Candidate	Votes	%
Democratic	Christine Chandler (incumbent)	11,094	100.0
Total votes		11,094	100.0

=== District 44 ===
New Mexico's 44th House District general election, 2024
Party	Candidate	Votes	%
Democratic	Kathleen Cates (incumbent)	9,166	53
Republican	Ali Ennenga	8,158	47
Total votes		17,324	100.0

=== District 45 ===
New Mexico's 45th House District general election, 2024
Party	Candidate	Votes	%
Democratic	Linda Serrato (incumbent)	10,767	100.0
Total votes		10,767	100.0

=== District 46 ===
New Mexico's 46th House District general election, 2024
Party	Candidate	Votes	%
Democratic	Andrea Romero (incumbent)	12,736	100.0
Total votes		12,736	100.0

=== General election ===
New Mexico's 47th House District general election, 2024
Party	Candidate	Votes	%
Democratic	Reena Szczepanski (incumbent)	15,772	100.0
Total votes		15,772	100.0

=== District 48 ===
New Mexico's 48th House District general election, 2024
Party	Candidate	Votes	%
Democratic	Tara Lujan (incumbent)	10,883	100.0
Total votes		10,883	100.0

=== District 49 ===
New Mexico's 49th House District general election, 2024
Party	Candidate	Votes	%
Republican	Gail Armstrong (incumbent)	10,879	100.0
Total votes		10,879	100.0

=== District 50 ===
New Mexico's 50th House District general election, 2024
Party	Candidate	Votes	%
Democratic	Matthew McQueen (incumbent)	12,029	62
Republican	Kenneth Donald Brennan	7,497	38
Total votes		19,526	100.0

=== District 51 ===
New Mexico's 51st House District general election, 2024
Party	Candidate	Votes	%
Republican	John Block (incumbent)	7,514	61
Democratic	Ashlie L. Myers	4,781	39
Total votes		12,295	100.0

=== District 52 ===
New Mexico's 52nd House District general election, 2024
Party	Candidate	Votes	%
Democratic	Doreen Gallegos (incumbent)	7,161	100.0
Total votes		7,161	100.0

=== District 53 ===
Democratic primary

New Mexico's 53rd House District Democratic primary, 2024
Party	Candidate	Votes	%
Democratic	Jon Hill	635	58.3
Democratic	Willie D. Madrid (incumbent)	455	41.7
Total votes		1,090	100.0

After the primary, Jon Hill withdrew from the election due to health reasons. Hill died on August 16, 2024. Three candidates vied to replace Hill on the ballot, including Sarah Silva (endorsed by Hill) and the ousted incumbent Madrid. The New Mexico Democratic Party unanimously selected Silva to replace Hill on the ballot on August 24, 2024.

General election

New Mexico's 53rd House District general election, 2024
Party	Candidate	Votes	%
Democratic	Sarah Silva	4,871	51
Republican	Elizabeth Lee Winterrowd	4,713	49
Total votes		9,584	100.0

=== District 54 ===
New Mexico's 54th House District general election, 2024
Party	Candidate	Votes	%
Republican	Jonathan Henry	8,296	83
Libertarian	Christian Scott Ehmling	1,678	17
Total votes		9,974	100.0

=== District 55 ===
New Mexico's 55th House District general election, 2024
Party	Candidate	Votes	%
Republican	Cathrynn Brown (incumbent)	9,919	100.0
Total votes		9,919	100.0

=== District 56 ===
New Mexico's 56th House District general election, 2024
Party	Candidate	Votes	%
Republican	Harlan Vincent (incumbent)	10,951	100.0
Total votes		10,951	100.0

=== District 57 ===
Republican primary

New Mexico's 57th House District general election, 2024
Party	Candidate	Votes	%
Republican	Catherine Cullen	525	37.4
Republican	John Dantonio Jr.	466	33.2
Republican	Corrine Rios	414	29.5
Total votes		1,405	100.0

General election

New Mexico's 57th House District general election, 2024
Party	Candidate	Votes	%
Republican	Catherine Cullen	8,373	50.4
Democratic	Michelle Sandoval	8,240	49.6
Total votes		16,613	100.0

Initial results showed Republican Catherine Cullen with a slight 130 vote lead. An automatic recount was triggered as there was less than 1% of the vote separating the candidates. The recount was finalized December 16. Cullen's victory was affirmed by the State Canvassing Board, with Cullen winning by 133 votes.

=== District 58 ===
New Mexico's 58th House District general election, 2024
Party	Candidate	Votes	%
Republican	Angelita Meija	5,823	100.0
Total votes		5,823	100.0

=== District 59 ===
New Mexico's 59th House District general election, 2024
Party	Candidate	Votes	%
Republican	Jared Hembree (incumbent)	9,547	100.0
Total votes		9,547	100.0

=== District 60 ===
New Mexico's 60th House District general election, 2024
Party	Candidate	Votes	%
Republican	Joshua Hernandez (incumbent)	8,166	57
Democratic	Luke Nicholas Jungmann	6,113	43
Total votes		14,279	100.0

=== District 61 ===
New Mexico's 61st House District general election, 2024
Party	Candidate	Votes	%
Republican	Randall Pettigrew (incumbent)	4,890	100.0
Total votes		4,890	100.0

=== District 62 ===
New Mexico's 62nd House District general election, 2024
Party	Candidate	Votes	%
Republican	Elaine Sena Cortez	8,993	100.0
Total votes		8,993	100.0

=== District 63 ===
New Mexico's 63rd House District general election, 2024
Party	Candidate	Votes	%
Republican	Martin R. Zamora (incumbent)	6,552	100.0
Total votes		6,552	100.0

=== District 64 ===
New Mexico's 64th House District general election, 2024
Party	Candidate	Votes	%
Republican	Andrea Reeb (incumbent)	10,035	100.0
Total votes		10,035	100.0

=== District 65 ===
New Mexico's 65th House District general election, 2024
Party	Candidate	Votes	%
Democratic	Derrick Lente (incumbent)	7,773	100.0
Total votes		7,773	100.0

=== District 66 ===
New Mexico's 66th House District general election, 2024
Party	Candidate	Votes	%
Republican	Jimmy Mason (incumbent)	8,379	100.0
Total votes		8,379	100.0

=== District 67 ===
New Mexico's 67h House District general election, 2024
Party	Candidate	Votes	%
Republican	Jackie Chatfield (incumbent)	9,392	100.0
Total votes		9,392	100.0

=== District 68 ===
New Mexico's 68th House District general election, 2024
Party	Candidate	Votes	%
Democratic	Charlotte Little (incumbent)	7,654	52
Republican	Nathan T. Brooks	7,007	48
Total votes		14,661	100.0

=== District 69 ===
Democratic primary

New Mexico's 69th House District Democratic primary, 2024
Party	Candidate	Votes	%
Democratic	Michelle Paulene Abeyta	1,346	56.8
Democratic	Harry Garcia (incumbent)	827	34.9
Democratic	Stanley Michael	195	8.2
Total votes		2,368	100.0

General election

New Mexico's 69th House District general election, 2024
Party	Candidate	Votes	%
Democratic	Michelle Paulene Abeyta	6,303	100.0
Total votes		6,303	100.0

=== District 70 ===
Democratic primary

New Mexico's 70th House District general election, 2024
Party	Candidate	Votes	%
Democratic	Anita Gonzales	2,434	55.2
Democratic	Ambrose Castellano (incumbent)	1,972	44.8
Total votes		4,406	100.0

General election

New Mexico's 70th House District general election, 2024
Party	Candidate	Votes	%
Democratic	Anita Gonzales	8,342	100.0
Total votes		8,342	100.0
