= Heather Ellison =

American politician

Member of the New Mexico House of Representatives from the 4th district
- Incumbent
- Assumed office January 2027

Personal details
- Party: Republican

Heather Scott Ellison is an American politician. She is the Republican member-elect of the New Mexico House of Representatives from the 4th district.

Prior to her election, Ellison worked in the education sector. She was an education consultant at the University of New Mexico, where she worked until his retirement in May 2026.

Ellison ran in the 2026 New Mexico House of Representatives election in the 4th district, at the time held by Democratic incumbent Joseph Franklin Hernandez. She won the Republican primary in June 2026, without any opposition.

In August 2026, Hernandez ended his campaign after media connected him to a police report on a July 2026 incident of public indecency at a hotel in Chicago. His withdrawal occurred on the deadline for qualifying for the general election ballot, and on September 3, 2026, the New Mexico Supreme Court upheld the San Juan County Clerk's ruling that the party could not replace Hernandez with Anthony Allison. Therefore, it was expected that Ellison would flip the seat for the Republicans given the lack of opposition. Indeed, she won the general election unopposed in November 2026.

Ellison is Navajo.

== See also ==
- List of Native American politicians
- Native American women in politics
