= Abbas Akhil =

American politician

Member of the New Mexico House of Representatives from the 20th district
- In office January 15, 2019 – January 19, 2021
- Preceded by: Jim Dines
- Succeeded by: Meredith Dixon

Personal details
- Born: Abbas Ali Akhil India
- Party: Democratic
- Education: Aligarh Muslim University (BS); New Mexico State University (MS)

Abbas Akhil is an Indian-American politician and engineer who served as a member of the New Mexico House of Representatives from 2019 to 2021. When he took office on January 15, 2019, Akhil became the first Muslim member of the New Mexico Legislature.

== Early life and education ==
Born in India, Akhil earned a Bachelor of Science in mechanical engineering from Aligarh Muslim University. He then relocated to New Mexico, where he earned a Master of Science in industrial engineering from New Mexico State University.

== Career ==
Prior to entering politics, Akhil worked as an engineer at Sandia National Laboratories. In 2017, he ran unsuccessfully for a seat on the Albuquerque Public Schools Board. In 2018, he defeated incumbent Republican Jim Dines to represent the 20th district. In October 2019, Akhil announced that he would not run for re-election in 2020.
