= List of Latino Democrats =

The following is an alphabetically ordered list of notable Latino members of the United States Democratic Party, past and present.

== A ==
- Aníbal Acevedo Vilá – former Governor of Puerto Rico and former resident commissioner of Puerto Rico
- Cristobal Aguilar – Mayor of Los Angeles
- Pete Aguilar – Congressman from California
- Jessica Alba – actress
- Aida Álvarez – 20th Administrator of the Small Business Administration
- David Alvarez – California state assemblyman
- Marianna Anaya – New Mexico state legislator
- Toney Anaya – 26th Governor of New Mexico
- Jerry Apodaca – 24th Governor of New Mexico
- Joaquin Arambula – California state assemblyman
- Bob Archuleta – California state senator
- Jesse Arreguín – California state senator
- Anamarie Avila Farias – California state assemblywoman

== B ==
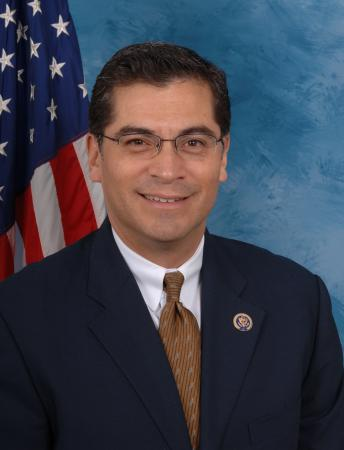
Xavier Becerra, Chairman of the House Democratic Caucus

- Joe Baca – former Congressman from California
- Joe Baca Jr. – former California state assemblyman
- José A. Baca – Lieutenant Governor of New Mexico
- Polly Baca – Chair of the Democratic Caucus of the Colorado House of Representatives (1976–79) and member of the Colorado State Senate and the House and Senate of a state Legislature.
- Herman Badillo – former Congressman from New York
- Hector Balderas – New Mexico Attorney General
- Nanette Barragán – Congresswoman from California
- Xavier Becerra – U.S. Secretary of Health and Human Services, former California Attorney General, and former Congressman from California
- Jaime Benítez Rexach – former resident commissioner of Puerto Rico
- Mia Bonta – California state assemblywoman
- Flavio Bravo – Arizona state senator
- Albert Bustamante – former Congressman from Texas
- Cruz Bustamante – 45th Lieutenant Governor of California

== C ==
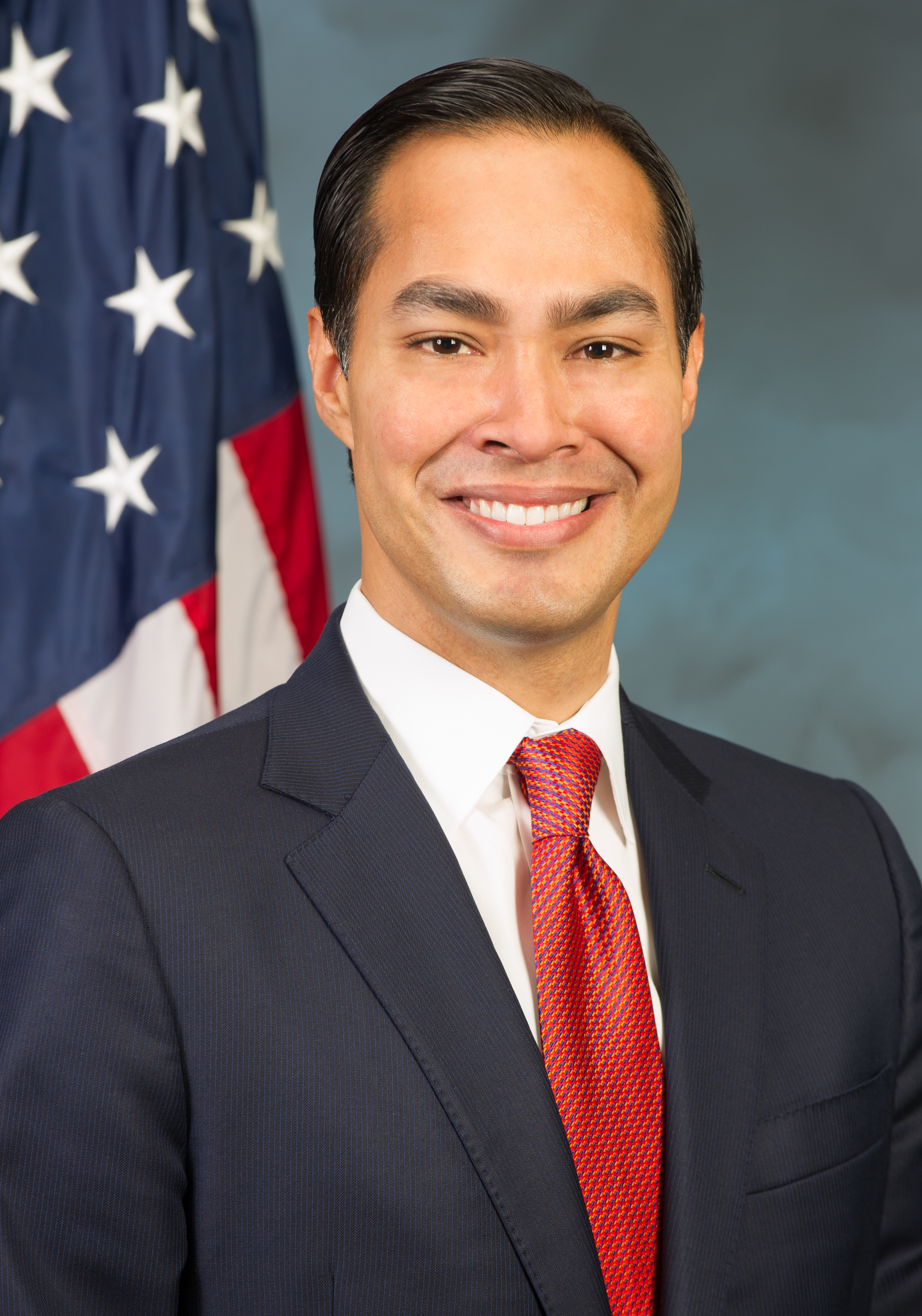
Julian Castro, 16th United States Secretary of Housing and Urban Development

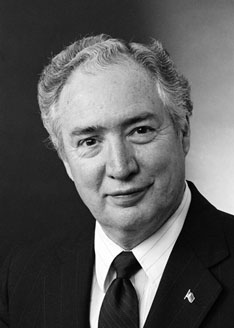
Lauro Cavazos, the first Hispanic Cabinet member

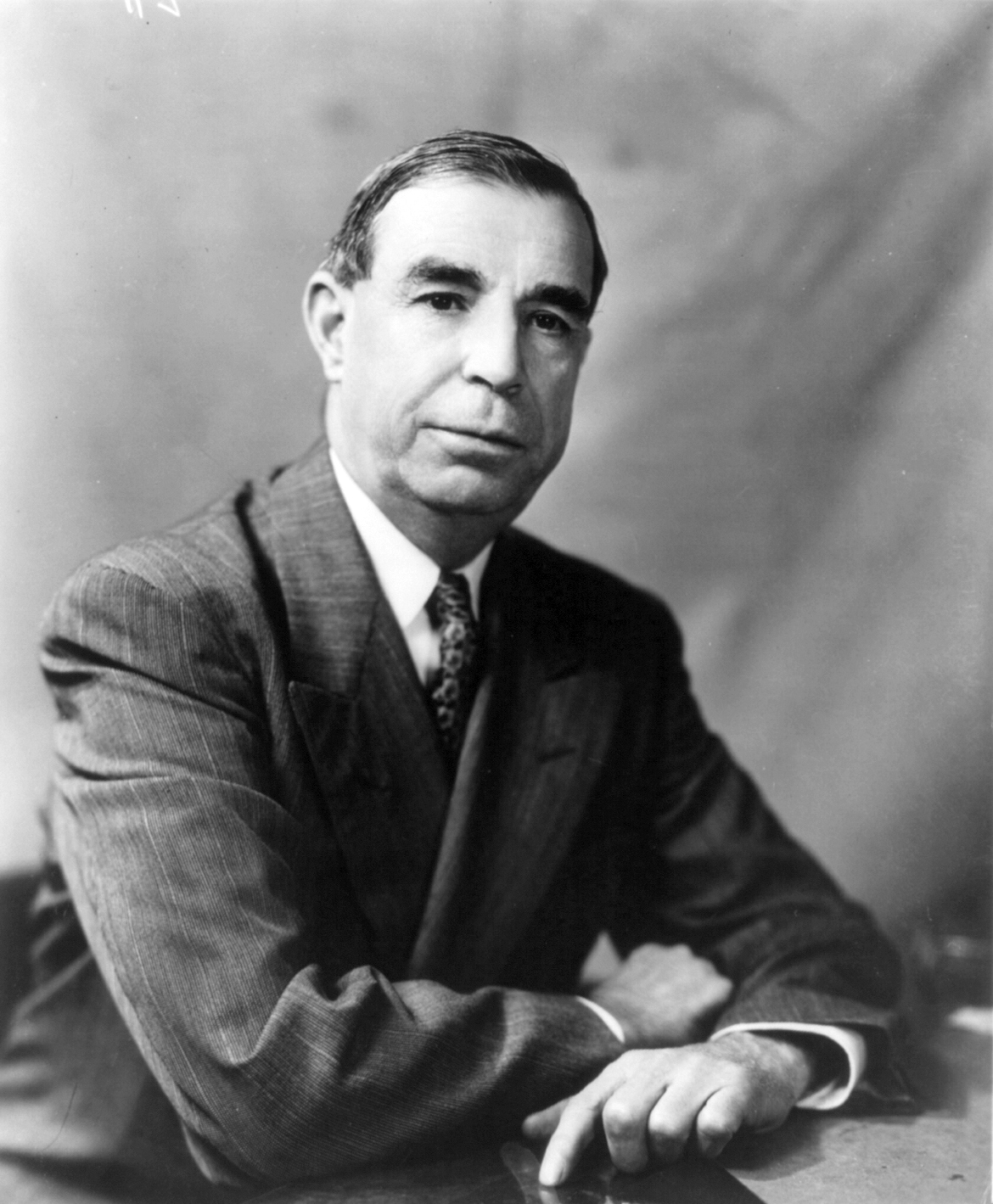
Dennis Chavez, the first American-born Hispanic Senator

- Anna Caballero – California state senator
- Charles Calderon – former Majority Leader of the California State Assembly
- Ian Calderon – former Majority Leader of the California State Assembly
- Lisa Calderon – California state assemblywoman
- Ron Calderon – former California state senator
- Sila María Calderón – Governor of Puerto Rico
- Tom Calderon – former California state assemblyman
- Yvanna Cancela – Chief of Staff to Nevada Governor
- Lisa Cano Burkhead – 36th Lieutenant Governor of Nevada
- Yadira Caraveo – Congresswoman from Colorado
- Miguel Cardona – 12th U.S. Secretary of Education
- Salud Carbajal – Congressman from California
- Tony Cárdenas – Congressman from California
- Richard Carmona – 17th Surgeon General of the United States
- Juan Carrillo – California state assemblyman
- Wendy Carrillo – California state assemblywoman
- Adolfo Carrión Jr. – Borough President of The Bronx
- Greg Casar – Congressman from Texas
- Julian Castro – United States Secretary of Housing and Urban Development
- Joaquin Castro – Congressman from Texas
- Raúl Héctor Castro – 14th Governor of Arizona
- Lauro Cavazos – former United States Secretary of Education
- Gil Cedillo – former Los Angeles City Council member
- Sabrina Cervantes – California state senator
- Dennis Chávez – former Senator and former Congressman from New Mexico
- Tibo J. Chávez – 15th Lieutenant Governor of New Mexico
- Julie Chávez Rodriguez – Senior Advisor to the President
- Gil Cisneros – Under Secretary of Defense and former Congressman from California
- Henry Cisneros – former United States Secretary of Housing and Urban Development
- Antonio Colorado – former resident commissioner of Puerto Rico
- Lupe Contreras – Minority Leader of the Arizona House of Representatives
- Patty Contreras – Arizona state representative
- Maria Contreras-Sweet – Administrator of the Small Business Administration
- Jorge Luis Córdova – former Resident Commissioner of Puerto Rico
- Baltasar Corrada del Río – former Resident Commissioner of Puerto Rico and former Associate Justice of the Supreme Court of Puerto Rico
- Lou Correa – Congressman from California
- Catherine Cortez Masto – Senator from Nevada
- Jim Costa – Congressman from California
- Michelee Crawford – Nevada state representative
- Catalina Cruz- New York State assemblywoman
- Henry Cuellar – Congressman from Texas

== D ==
- Ezequiel Cabeza De Baca – 2nd Governor of New Mexico
- Morris Fidanque de Castro – Governor of the United States Virgin Islands
- Kika de la Garza – former Congressman from Texas
- Pablo de la Guerra – acting Lieutenant Governor of California
- Kevin de León – Los Angeles City Council member and former president pro tempore of the California Senate
- Oscar De Los Santos – Arizona state representative
- Ron de Lugo – former delegate from the U.S. Virgin Islands
- Antonio Delgado – Lieutenant Governor of New York and former Congressman from New York
- Mo Denis – Nevada state senator and former Majority Leader of the Nevada Senate
- Manny Diaz – former Mayor of Miami
- Rubén Díaz Jr. – Borough President of The Bronx
- Fabian Doñate – Nevada state senator
- Monica Duran – Majority Leader of the Colorado House of Representatives
- María Elena Durazo – California state senator

== E ==
- Sade Elhawary – California state assemblywoman
- Jorge Elorza – Mayor of Providence, Rhode Island
- Veronica Escobar – Congresswoman from Texas
- Pedro Espada Jr. – Majority Leader of the New York State Senate
- Diego Espinoza – former Arizona state representative
- Adriano Espaillat – Congressman from New York
- Albert Estopinal – former Congressman from Louisiana

== F ==
- Hydee Feldstein Soto – Los Angeles City Attorney
- Brian Fernandez – Arizona state senator
- Maurice Ferre – former Mayor of Miami
- Fernando Ferrer – Borough President of The Bronx
- Antonio M. Fernández – former Congressman from New Mexico
- Joachim O. Fernández – former Congressman from Louisiana
- Antonio Fernós Isern – former resident commissioner of Puerto Rico
- Edgar Flores – Nevada state senator
- Maxwell Frost – Congressman from Florida
- Jaime Fuster – resident commissioner of Puerto Rico and former Associate Justice of the Supreme Court of Puerto Rico

== G ==
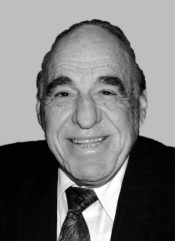
Henry B. Gonzalez, the first Hispanic Congressman from Texas

- Rosanna Gabaldón – Arizona state senator
- Pete Gallego – Congressman from Texas
- Ruben Gallego – Senator from Arizona
- Jose Manuel Gallegos – Delegate from New Mexico
- Eric Garcetti – 42nd Mayor of Los Angeles
- Chuy García – Congressman from Illinois
- David Garcia – education researcher
- Eduardo Garcia – California state assemblyman
- Franklin Garcia – shadow congressperson from the District of Columbia
- Joe Garcia – former Congressman from Florida
- Joseph Garcia – 48th Lieutenant Governor of Colorado
- Lorena Garcia – Colorado state representative
- Martha Garcia – New Mexico state legislator
- Robert Garcia – Congressman from California and former Mayor of Long Beach
- Robert Garcia – California state assemblyman
- Robert García – Congressman from New York
- Sylvia Garcia – Congresswoman from Texas
- Alejandro García Padilla – Governor of Puerto Rico
- Edward D. Garza – Mayor of San Antonio
- George Gascón – District Attorney of Los Angeles County, former District Attorney of San Francisco
- Thomas Gill – 4th Lieutenant Governor of Hawaii and Congressman from Hawaii
- Todd Gloria – mayor of San Diego
- Marie Gluesenkamp Perez – Congresswoman from Washington
- Jimmy Gomez – Congressman from California
- Julie Gonzales – Colorado state senator
- Serena Gonzales-Gutierrez – Colorado state representative
- Cecelia González – Nevada state assemblywoman
- Charlie Gonzalez – former Congressman from Texas
- Henry B. Gonzalez – former Congressman from Texas
- Kristen Gonzalez- New York state senator
- Lena Gonzalez – Majority Leader of the California Senate
- Mark Gonzalez – California state assemblyman
- Michelle Rodriguez – California state assemblywoman
- Vicente Gonzalez – Congressman from Texas
- Nellie Gorbea – Rhode Island Secretary of State
- Adelita Grijalva – Congresswoman from Arizona
- Raúl Grijalva – Congressman from Arizona
- Luis V. Gutierrez – Congressman from Illinois
- Isabel Guzman – 27th Administrator of the Small Business Administration

== H ==
- Alma Hernandez – Arizona state representative
- Consuelo Hernandez – Arizona state representative
- Elizabeth Hernandez – chairwoman of the Democratic Party of Illinois
- Eunisses Hernandez – Los Angeles City Council member
- José M. Hernández – NASA astronaut
- Lydia Hernandez – Arizona state representative
- Melody Hernandez – Arizona state representative
- Rafael Hernández Colón – Governor of Puerto Rico
- Pablo Hernández Rivera – Resident Commissioner of Puerto Rico
- Tim Hernández – Colorado state representative
- Lina Hidalgo – Harris County Judge
- Ruben Hinojosa – Congressman from Texas
- Dolores Huerta – co-founder of the United Farm Workers
- Melissa Hurtado – California state senator

== K ==
- Ruben Kihuen – former Congressman from Nevada
- John King Jr. – 10th U.S. Secretary of Education

== L ==
- Ricardo Lara – California Insurance Commissioner
- Ladislas Lazaro – former Congressman from Louisiana
- Oscar Leeser – Mayor of El Paso
- Teresa Leger Fernandez – Congresswoman from New Mexico
- Mike Levin – Congressman from California
- Sonya Jaquez Lewis – Colorado state senator
- Sam Liccardo – Congressman from California, 65th Mayor of San Jose
- Monique Limón – California state senator
- Eva Longoria – actress
- Ben Ray Luján – Senator and former Congressman from New Mexico
- Michelle Luján Grisham – Governor of New Mexico
- Casey Luna – 26th Lieutenant Governor of New Mexico
- Elda Luna-Nájera – Arizona state representative

== M ==
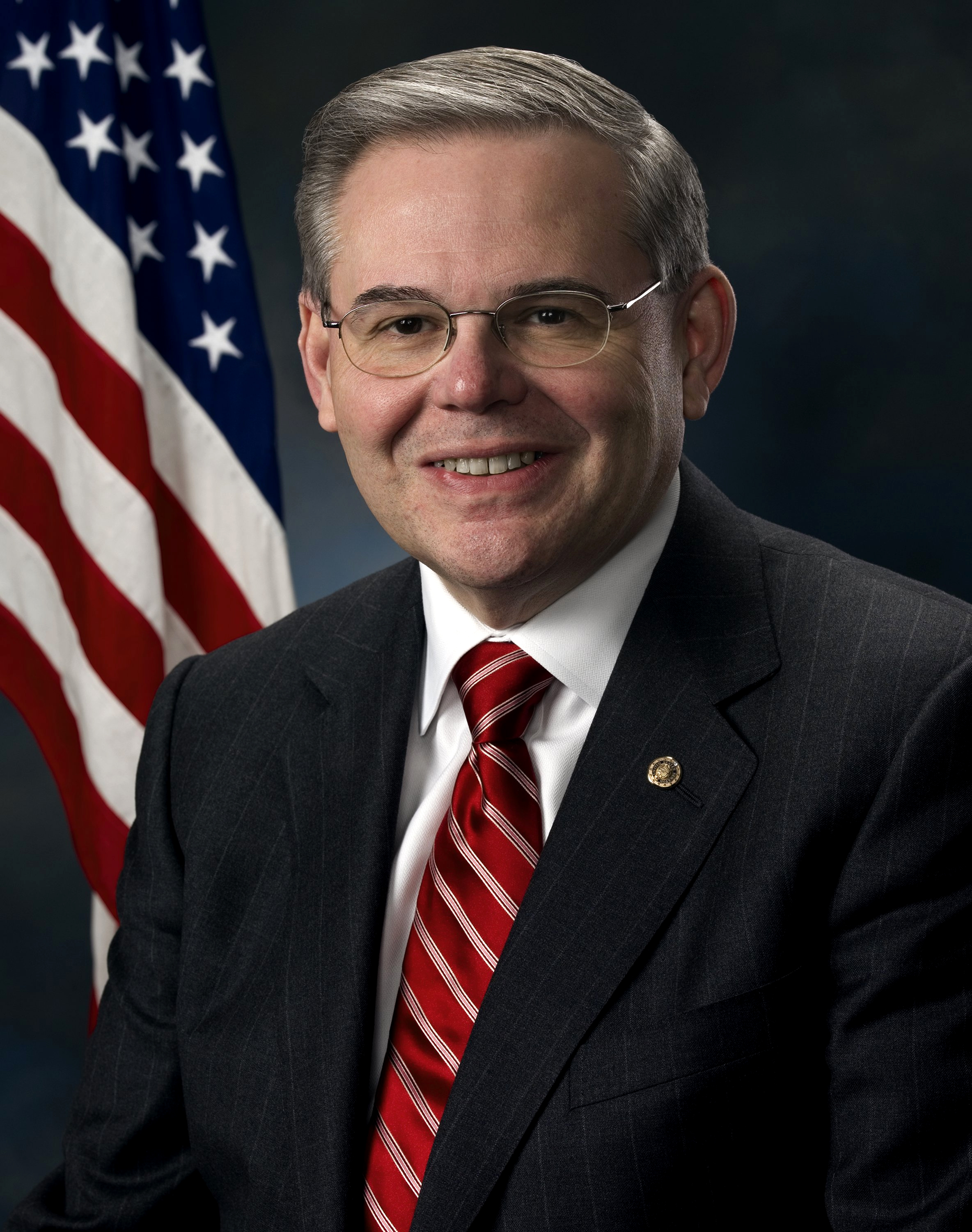
Robert Menendez, Senator from New Jersey

- Patricia A. Madrid – New Mexico Attorney General
- Louis H. Marrero – Senator from Louisiana
- Javier Martínez – Speaker of the New Mexico House of Representatives
- Joe L. Martínez – New Mexico Attorney General
- Matthew Martinez – Colorado state representative
- Monica Martinez- New York state senator
- Nury Martinez – former President of the Los Angeles City Council
- Elaine Marzola – Nevada state assemblywoman
- Sabina Matos – 70th Lieutenant Governor of Rhode Island
- Alejandro Mayorkas – 7th U.S. Secretary of Homeland Security
- Myrna Melgar – member of the San Francisco Board of Supervisors
- Juan Mendez – Arizona state senator
- Bob Menendez – Senator from New Jersey
- Rob Menendez – Congressman from New Jersey
- Caroline Menjivar – California state senator
- Catherine Miranda – Arizona state senator
- Roberto Mondragón – 21st Lieutenant Governor of New Mexico
- Joseph Montoya – former Senator from New Mexico
- Dan Morales – Texas Attorney General
- Howie Morales – 30th Lieutenant Governor of New Mexico
- Debbie Mucarsel-Powell – former Congresswoman from Florida
- Cecilia Muñoz – director of the White House Domestic Policy Council
- Janet Murguia – President of the National Council of La Raza

== N ==
- Grace Napolitano – Congresswoman from California
- Gloria Negrete McLeod – former Congresswoman from California
- Fabian Núñez – former Speaker of the California State Assembly
- Samuel B. Nunez Jr. – President of the Louisiana State Senate

== O ==
- Alexandria Ocasio-Cortez – Congresswoman from New York City
- Liz Ortega – California state assemblywoman
- Solomon P. Ortiz – former Congressman from Texas

== P ==
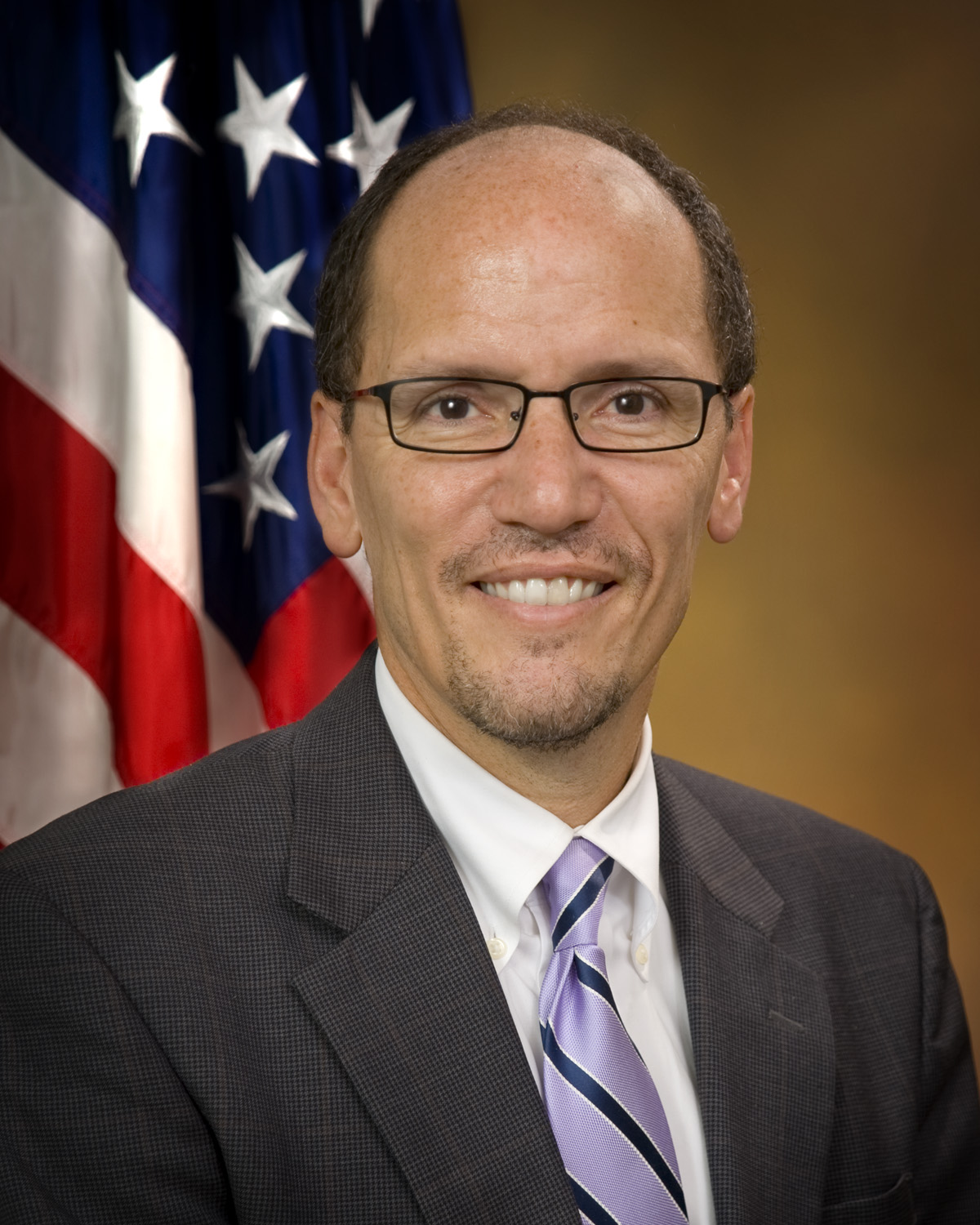
Tom Perez, 26th United States Secretary of Labor

- Blanca Pacheco – California state assemblywoman
- Alex Padilla – Senator from California
- Imelda Padilla – Los Angeles City Council member
- Steve Padilla – California state senator
- Ed Pastor – Congressman from Arizona
- Federico Peña – former United States Secretary of Transportation and former United States Secretary of Energy
- John Pérez – former Speaker of the California State Assembly
- Leander Perez – Democratic political boss of Plaquemines and St. Bernard parishes, Louisiana
- Sasha Renée Pérez – California state senator
- Tom Perez – United States Secretary of Labor
- Pedro Pierluisi – Governor of Puerto Rico and former resident commissioner of Puerto Rico
- Jesús T. Piñero – former Governor of Puerto Rico and former resident commissioner of Puerto Rico
- Santiago Polanco-Abreu – former resident commissioner of Puerto Rico
- Nellie Pou – Congresswoman from New Jersey

== Q ==
- Ceferino Quintana – Lieutenant Governor of New Mexico
- Chente Quintanilla – Texas state representative

== R ==
- Delia Ramirez – Congresswoman from Illinois
- Jessica Ramos – New York state senator
- Emily Randall – Congresswoman from Washington
- Anthony Rendon – former Speaker of the California State Assembly
- Eloise Reyes – California state senator
- Silvestre Reyes – former Congressman from Texas
- Antonio Reynoso – Borough President of Brooklyn
- Bill Richardson – former Congressman and the 30th Governor of New Mexico
- Luz Rivas – Congresswoman from California
- Robert A. Rivas – Speaker of the California State Assembly
- Celeste Rodriguez – California state assemblywoman
- Freddie Rodriguez – California state assemblyman
- Monica Rodriguez – Los Angeles City Council member
- Robert Rodriguez – Majority Leader of the Colorado Senate
- Regina Romero – Mayor of Tucson, Arizona
- Carlos Romero Barceló – Governor of Puerto Rico and resident commissioner of Puerto Rico
- Pedro Rosselló – shadow congressperson from Puerto Rico and former Governor of Puerto Rico
- Ricardo Rosselló – shadow congressperson from Puerto Rico and former Governor of Puerto Rico
- Edward R. Roybal – former Congressman from California
- Lucille Roybal-Allard – Congresswoman from California
- Blanca Rubio – California state assemblywoman
- Susan Rubio – California state senator
- Raul Ruiz – Congressman from California

== S ==
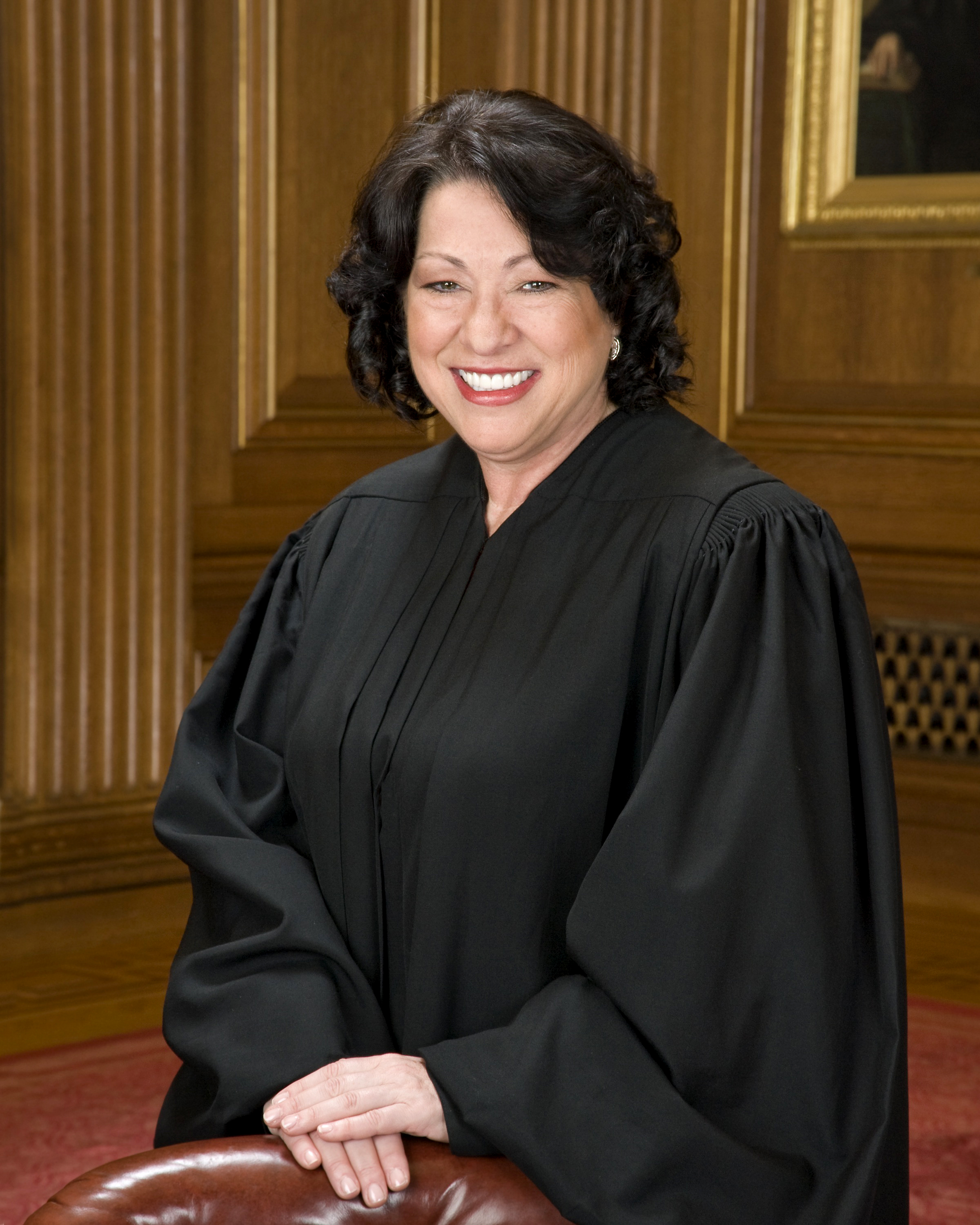
Sonia Sotomayor, the first Hispanic Supreme Court Justice

- Gregorio Sablan – Delegate from the Northern Mariana Islands
- Rudy Salas – former California state assemblyman
- Julia Salazar- New York state senator
- Ken Salazar – 50th U.S. Secretary of the Interior and former Senator from Colorado
- Andrea Salinas – Congresswoman from Oregon
- Linda Sanchez – Congresswoman from California
- Loretta Sanchez – Congresswoman from California
- Roberto Sánchez Vilella – Governor of Puerto Rico
- Mariana Sandoval – Arizona state representative
- Miguel Santiago – California state assemblyman
- Pedro Segarra – Mayor of Hartford, Connecticut
- José E. Serrano – Congressman from New York
- Albio Sires – Congressman from New Jersey
- Jose Solache – California state assemblyman
- Hilda Solis – former Congresswoman from California and the 25th United States Secretary of Labor
- Esmeralda Soria – California state assemblywoman
- Darren Soto – Congressman from Florida
- Hugo Soto-Martinez – Los Angeles City Council member
- Sonia Sotomayor – Associate Justice of the United States Supreme Court
- Ray Suarez – Vice Mayor of Chicago

== T ==
- Yudelka Tapia- New York State assemblywoman
- Angel Taveras – Mayor of Providence, Rhode Island
- Esteban Edward Torres – former Congressman from California
- Norma Torres – Congresswoman from California
- Ritchie Torres – Congressman from New York
- Selena Torres – Nevada state assemblywoman
- Patricia Torres Ray – first Hispanic woman to serve in the MN Senate as MN Democratic–Farmer–Labor Party SD63
- Xochitl Torres Small – U.S. Deputy Secretary of Agriculture and former Congresswoman from New Mexico
- Raúl Torrez – New Mexico Attorney General

== V ==
- Alex Valdez – Colorado state representative
- Donald Valdez – Colorado state representative
- Avelino Valencia – California state assemblyman
- Juan Vargas – Congressman from California
- Gabe Vasquez – Congressman from New Mexico
- Filemon Vela Jr. – former Congressman from Texas
- Nydia Velázquez – Congresswoman from New York
- Alex Villanueva – former Los Angeles County Sheriff
- Carlos Villapudua – California state assemblyman
- Antonio Villaraigosa – 41st Mayor of Los Angeles

== Z ==
- Rick Zbur – California state assemblyman

== See also ==
- Congressional Hispanic Caucus
- List of Latin Americans
- List of Hispanic and Latino Republicans
- List of Latino Americans in the United States Congress
