= Jane Powdrell-Culbert =

American politician (born 1949)

Member of the New Mexico House of Representatives from the 44th district
- In office January 2003 – January 1, 2023
- Preceded by: Judy Vanderstar Russell
- Succeeded by: Kathleen Cates

Personal details
- Born: April 30, 1949 (age 77) Albuquerque, New Mexico, U.S.
- Party: Republican

Jane E. Powdrell-Culbert (born April 30, 1949) is an American politician who served as a Republican member of the New Mexico House of Representatives for the 44th district from 2003 to 2023.

During her tenure, Powdrell-Culbert was known for her bipartisan legislative efforts. In 2021, she co-sponsored House Bill 55, the Public-Private Partnership (P3) Act, alongside both Democratic and Republican legislators. This legislation aimed to facilitate collaborations between public agencies and private investors to enhance New Mexico's broadband and transportation infrastructure. The bill passed the House with a 63–2 vote.

In recognition of her contributions, the University of New Mexico Black Alumni Chapter honored Powdrell-Culbert with a Trailblazer Award in 2019.

== Elections ==
- 2002: When the District 44 incumbent Republican Representative Judy Vanderstar Russell ran for Lieutenant Governor of New Mexico, Powdrell-Culbert ran in the 2002 Republican primary, winning with 892 votes (51.3%) and won the November 5, 2002, general election with 5,080 votes (64.3%) against the Democratic nominee Mara Minwegen.
- 2004: Powdrell-Culbert was unopposed for both the June 1, 2004, Republican primary, winning with 618 votes and the November 2, 2004, general election, winning with 12,018 votes.
- 2006: Powdrell-Culbert was unopposed for the June 6, 2006, Republican primary, winning with 817 votes and won the November 7, 2006, general election with 7,516 votes (59.1%) against the Democratic nominee Eliot Gould.
- 2008: Powdrell-Culbert was unopposed for the June 8, 2008, Republican primary, winning with 2,527 votes and won the November 4, 2008, general election with 11,581 votes (54.1%) against Lisa Cour.
- 2010: Powdrell-Culbert was unopposed for the June 1, 2010, Republican primary, winning with 2,840 votes and won the November 2, 2010, general election with 9,960 votes (62.8%) against the Democratic nominee Joel Davis.
- 2012: Powdrell-Culbert was unopposed for both the June 5, 2012, Republican primary, winning with 1,486 votes and the November 6, 2012, general election, winning with 10,136 votes.
