= Idalia Lechuga-Tena =

American politician

Member of the New Mexico House of Representatives from the 21st district
- In office November 18, 2015 – January 2017
- Preceded by: Mimi Stewart
- Succeeded by: Debra M. Sariñana

Personal details
- Born: Mexico
- Party: Democratic
- Spouse: Marco Gonzales
- Education: University of New Mexico (BA)

Idalia Lechuga-Tena is a Mexican-born American politician who served as a member of the New Mexico House of Representatives for the 21st district from November 18, 2015 to January 2017.

== Early life and education ==
Lechuga-Tena was born in Mexico and raised in Albuquerque, New Mexico. She earned a Bachelor of Arts degree in economics and political science from the University of New Mexico.

== Career ==
Lechuga-Tena worked on the unsuccessful mayoral campaign of Pete Dinelli and was a legislative analyst for the New Mexico House of Representatives Majority Office. She was also an assistant to Mayor Martin Chávez and was the communications director for the New Mexico Medicaid Electronic Health Records Incentive Program.

Lechuga-Tena was appointed to the New Mexico House of Representatives in November 2015 and served for one term. In 2016, she was defeated for re-election by Debra M. Sariñana. In 2020, she was a candidate for the 20th district of the New Mexico Senate, placing third in the Democratic primary.

After Melanie Stansbury was elected to the United States House of Representatives in June 2021, Lechuga-Tena declared her candidacy to succeed her in the New Mexico House of Representatives.

Lechuga-Tena is running for Albuquerque City Council in 2023, facing off against retired law enforcement offerice Daniel Champine for the District 8 seat to replace retiring Councilor Trudy Jones.

== Personal life ==
Lechuga-Tena is married to Marco Gonzales, an attorney. In 2018, Gonzales acted as Lechuga-Tena's lawyer after she was barred from running for the New Mexico House of Representatives due to a residency violation.
