= New Mexico Legislature =

Legislative branch of the state government of New Mexico

New Mexico Legislature La Legislatura de Nuevo México

Type
- Type: Bicameral
- Houses: Senate; House of Representatives
- Term limits: None

History
- New session started: January 17, 2023

Leadership
- Senate President: Howie Morales (D) since January 1, 2019
- Senate President pro tempore: Mimi Stewart (D) since January 19, 2021
- House Speaker: Javier Martínez (D) since January 17, 2023

Structure
- Seats: 112
- Senate political groups: Democratic (26); Republican (16)
- House political groups: Democratic (44); Republican (26)
- Length of term: Senate: 4 years House: 2 years
- Salary: $0/year + per diem
- State Senators: 42
- State Representatives: 70

Elections
- Senate voting system: First-past-the-post
- House voting system: First-past-the-post
- Last Senate election: November 5, 2024
- Last House election: November 5, 2024
- Next Senate election: November 7, 2028
- Next House election: November 3, 2026
- Redistricting: Legislative control

Motto
- Crescit eundo

Meeting place
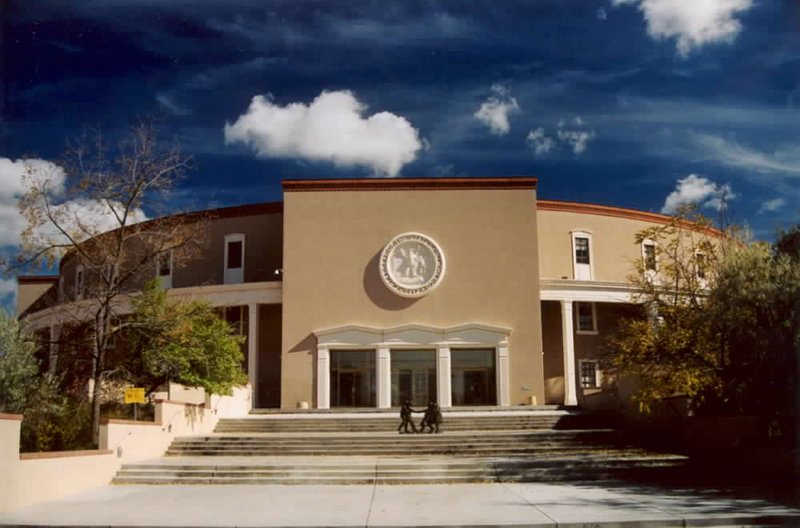
- New Mexico State Capitol; Santa Fe

Website
- nmlegis.gov

Constitution
- Constitution of New Mexico

The New Mexico Legislature (Spanish: Legislatura de Nuevo México) is the legislative branch of the state government of New Mexico. It is a bicameral body made up of the New Mexico House of Representatives and the New Mexico Senate.

== History ==
The New Mexico Legislature was established when New Mexico officially became a state and was admitted to the union in 1912. Congress established New Mexico as a territory in 1850 before it became a state. Over the span of 62 years, five constitutional conventions were held which resulted in four distinct draft constitutions. The fourth draft was ratified and became effective in 1912 when New Mexico became the 47th state.

In 1922, Bertha M. Paxton became the first woman elected to the New Mexico Legislature, serving one term in the House of Representatives.

== Session structure and operations ==
The Legislature meets every year, in regular session on the third Tuesday in January. The New Mexico Constitution limits the regular session to 60 calendar days, every other year it is 30 days. The lieutenant governor presides over the Senate, while the Speaker of the House is elected from that body in a closed-door majority-member caucus. Both have wide latitude in choosing committee membership in their respective houses and have a large impact on lawmaking in the state.

While only the Governor can call the Legislature into special sessions, the Legislature can call itself into an extraordinary session. There is no limit on the number of special sessions a governor can call. The New Mexico Constitution does not limit the duration of each special session; lawmakers may consider only those issues designated by the governor in the "call," or proclamation convening the special session (though other issues may be added by the Governor during a session).

Any bill passed by the Legislature and signed by the governor takes effect 90 days after its passage unless two-thirds of each house votes to give the bill immediate effect, earlier effect (before 90 day period), or later effect (after 90 day period).

== Compensation ==
New Mexico does not pay its legislators a base salary. Legislators receive per diem of $191 per day for work at the capitol or committee hearings and mileage reimbursement at the federal rate of 70 cents per mile. They can receive a per diem outside of legislative session.

== Qualifications ==
The state constitution requires representatives to be at least twenty-one years old and senators to be at least twenty-five, and members of both houses must live in the districts they represent.

== Districting ==
The legislature consists of 70 representatives and 42 senators. Each member of the House represents roughly 25,980 residents of New Mexico. Each member of the Senate represents roughly 43,300 residents. Currently the Democratic Party holds a majority in both of the chambers of New Mexico Legislature, and holds the Governor's office.

=== Redistricting ===
In 2021, Senate Bill 304 established the Citizen Redistricting Committee. The committee is to develop three redistricting plans to recommend to the Legislature for each of the following: U.S. House of Representatives, New Mexico House of Representatives, New Mexico Senate, and any other state offices requiring redistricting. As of the summer of 2021, the latter consisted of only the New Mexico Public Education Commission. The Legislature is still free to make its own redistricting plans.

=== Term limits ===
Currently, there are no term limits for legislators. The longest current member of the legislature has served since 1972. House members are elected every two years, while Senate members are elected every four years.

== Party summary ==
=== State Senate ===
27 Democrats
15 Republicans

Affiliation	Party (Shading indicates majority caucus)		Total	
Affiliation	Democratic	Republican	Total	Vacant
End of previous legislature	27	15	42	0
Jan 1, 2015 - Mar 14, 2015	25	17	42	0
Mar 14, 2015 - Apr 5, 2015	24	17	41	1
Apr 5, 2015 – Jan 17, 2017	24	18	42	0
Jan 17, 2017 – Jan 19, 2021	26	16	42	0
Jan 19, 2021 – present	27	15	42	0

=== House of Representatives ===
44 Democrats
24 Republicans
2 Independents
1 vacancy

Affiliation	Party (Shading indicates majority caucus)			Total	
Affiliation	Democratic	Ind	Republican	Total	Vacant
51st legislature	38	0	32	70	0
52nd legislature	33	0	37	70	0
53rd legislature	38	0	32	70	0
54th legislature	46	1	23	70	0
55th legislature	43	2	24	69	1
56th legislature	45	0	25	70	0

== List of legislatures ==
This is a list of legislatures of New Mexico since statehood in 1912.

Session	Years	House				Senate				Governor
Session	Years	Total	Democrats	Republicans	Others	Total	Democrats	Republicans	Others	Governor
1st	1912–1914	49	16	30	3	24	7	16	1	William W. McDonald
2nd	1915-1916	49	14	33	2	24	7	16	1	William W. McDonald
3rd	1917-1918	49	19	30	-	24	10	14	-	Ezequiel Cabeza De Baca
3rd	1917-1918	49	19	30	-	24	10	14	-	Washington E. Lindsey
4th	1919-1920	49	15	34	-	24	9	15	-	Octaviano Larrazolo
5th	1921-1922	49	15	34	-	24	9	15	-	Merritt C. Mechem
6th	1923-1924	49	33	16	-	24	9	15	-	James F. Hinkle
7th	1925-1926	49	28	21	-	24	11	13	-	Arthur T. Hannett
8th	1927-1928	49	18	31	-	24	11	13	-	Richard C. Dillon
9th	1929-1930	49	12	37	-	24	6	18	-	Richard C. Dillon
10th	1931-1932	49	28	21	-	24	8	16	-	Arthur Seligman
11th	1933-1934	49	41	8	-	24	20	4	-	Arthur Seligman
11th	1933-1934	49	42	7	-	24	20	4	-	Andrew W. Hockenhull
12th	1935-1936	49	38	12	-	24	18	6	-	Clyde Tingley
13th	1937-1938	49	47	2	-	24	23	1	-	Clyde Tingley
14th	1939-1940	49	42	7	-	24	23	1	-	John E. Miles
15th	1941-1942	49	40	9	-	24	21	3	-	John E. Miles
16th	1943-1944	49	33	16	-	24	21	3	-	John J. Dempsey
17th	1945-1946	49	30	19	-	24	18	6	-	John J. Dempsey
18th	1947-1948	49	30	19	-	24	18	6	-	Thomas J. Mabry
19th	1949-1950	49	36	13	-	24	19	5	-	Thomas J. Mabry
20th	1951-1952	55	46	9	-	24	18	6	-	Edwin L. Mechem
21st	1953-1954	55	27	28	-	31	22	9	-	Edwin L. Mechem
22nd	1955-1956	55	51	4	-	32	23	9	-	John F. Simms
23rd	1957-1958	66	43	23	-	32	24	8	-	Edwin L. Mechem
24th	1959-1960	66	60	6	-	32	24	8	-	John Burroughs
25th	1961-1962	66	59	7	-	32	28	4	-	Edwin L. Mechem
25th	1961-1962	66	59	7	-	32	28	4	-	Tom Bolack
26th	1963-1964	66	55	11	-	32	28	4	-	Jack M. Campbell
27th	1965-1966	77	59	18	-	32	28	4	-	Jack M. Campbell
28th	1967-1968	70	45	25	-	42	25	17	-	David F. Cargo
29th	1969-1970	70	44	26	-	42	25	17	-	David F. Cargo
30th	1971-1972	70	48	22	-	42	28	14	-	Bruce King
31st	1973-1974	70	51	19	-	42	30	12	-	Bruce King
31st	1973-1974	70	50	20	-	42	30	12	-	Bruce King
32nd	1975-1976	70	51	19	-	42	29	13	-	Jerry Apodaca
32nd	1975-1976	70	51	19	-	42	30	12	-	Jerry Apodaca
33rd	1977-1978	70	48	22	-	42	33	9	-	Jerry Apodaca
34th	1979-1980	70	41	29 (Note: Coalition of 11 Democrats and 29 Republicans controlled the House Majority)	-	42	33	9	-	Bruce King
34th	1979-1980	70	41	29	-	42	32	10	-	Bruce King
35th	1981-1982	70	41	29 (Note: Coalition of 10 Democrats and 27 Republicans controlled the House Majority)	-	42	22	20	-	Bruce King
35th	1981-1982	70	41	29	-	42	23	19	-	Bruce King
36th	1983-1984	70	46	24	-	42	23	19	-	Toney Anaya
36th	1983-1984	70	47	23	-	42	23	19	-	Toney Anaya
37th	1985-1986	70	43	27 (Note: Coalition of 10 Democrats and 26 Republicans controlled the House Majority)	-	42	21	21 (Note: Coalition of 4 Democrats and 21 Republicans controlled the Senate Majority until one of the Democrats switched parties in late 1985, giving the Republicans outright control)	-	Toney Anaya
37th	1985-1986	70	43	27	-	42	20	22	-	Toney Anaya
37th	1985-1986	70	43	27	-	42	20 (Note: Coalition of 4 Republicans and 19 Democrats controlled the Senate Majority in the 37th Session's special legislative session in September 1986.)	22	-	Toney Anaya
38th	1987-1988	70	47	23	-	42	21 (Note: Coalition of 3 Republicans and 21 Democrats controlled the Senate Majority)	21	-	Garrey Carruthers
38th	1987-1988	70	46	24	-	42	21	21 (Note: Coalition of 5 Democrats and 18 Republicans controlled the Senate Majority beginning in January 1988)	-	Garrey Carruthers
39th	1989-1990	70	45	25	-	42	26	16	-	Garrey Carruthers
39th	1989-1990	70	45	25	-	42	25	17	-	Garrey Carruthers
40th	1991-1992	70	49	21	-	42	26	16	-	Bruce King
41st	1993-1994	70	53	17	-	42	27	15	-	Bruce King
42nd	1995-1996	70	46	24	-	42	27	15	-	Gary Johnson
43rd	1997-1998	70	42	28	-	42	25	17	-	Gary Johnson
44th	1999-2000	70	40	30	-	42	25	17	-	Gary Johnson
45th	2001-2002	70	42	28	-	42	24	18	-	Gary Johnson
46th	2003-2004	70	43	27	-	42	24	18	-	Bill Richardson
47th	2005-2006	70	42	28	-	42	24	18	-	Bill Richardson
48th	2007-2008	70	42	28	-	42	24	18	-	Bill Richardson
49th	2009-2010	70	45	25	-	42	27	15	-	Bill Richardson
50th	2011-2012	70	36	33	1	42	27	15	-	Susana Martinez
51st	2013-2014	70	38	32	-	42	25	17	-	Susana Martinez
52nd	2015-2016	70	33	37	-	42	24	18	-	Susana Martinez
53rd	2017-2018	70	38	32	-	42	26	16	-	Susana Martinez
54th	2019-2020	70	46	24	-	42	26	16	-	Michelle Lujan Grisham
55th	2021-2022	70	44	24	2	42	27	15	-	Michelle Lujan Grisham
56th	2023-2024	70	45	25	-	42	27	15	-	Michelle Lujan Grisham
57th	2025-2026	70	44	26	-	42	26	16	-	Michelle Lujan Grisham

== See also ==
- New Mexico Territorial Legislature
- Timeline of New Mexico history
