= Rickie Gonzales II =

American politician

Member-elect of the New Mexico House of Representatives from the 7th district
- Assuming office January 2027
- Succeeding: Tanya Mirabal Moya

Personal details
- Party: Democratic

Rickie Gonzales II (born 1978 or 1979) is an American politician and graphic designer. A member of the Democratic Party, he is the member-elect for the 7th district of the New Mexico House of Representatives.
