= Bill Rehm =

Member of the New Mexico House of Representatives

Member of the New Mexico House of Representatives from the 31st district
- In office January 2007 – December 31, 2024
- Preceded by: Greg Payne
- Succeeded by: Nicole Chavez

Personal details
- Party: Republican
- Profession: Police officer
- Website: billrehm.us

William R. Rehm is an American who served as a member of the New Mexico House of Representatives, representing District 31, from January 2007 to December 2024.

== Elections ==
- 2012 Rehm was challenged in the June 5, 2012 Republican Primary, but won with 1,898 votes (63.6%) and won the November 6, 2012 General election with 10,426 votes (60.1%) against Democratic nominee Joanne Allen.
- 2004 When District 31 Republican Representative Joseph Thompson left the Legislature, Rehm ran in the June 1, 2004 Republican Primary but lost to Greg Payne; Payne won the November 2, 2004 General election against Democratic nominee Michael Corwin.
- 2006 When Representative Payne left the Legislature, Rehm was unopposed for the June 6, 2006 Republican Primary, winning with 1,193 votes and won the November 7, 2006 General election with 7,443 votes (58.8%) against Democratic nominee Barbara Scharf.
- 2008 Rehm was unopposed for both the June 8, 2008 Republican Primary, winning with 3,241 votes and the November 4, 2008 General election, winning with 11,117 votes.
- 2010 Rehm was unopposed for the June 1, 2010 Republican Primary, winning with 3,037 votes and the November 2, 2010 General election, winning with 8,184 votes (63.2%) against Democratic nominee Michael Malloy.
