= Leanne Gandy =

American politician

Member-elect of the New Mexico House of Representatives from the 66th district
- Assuming office January 2027
- Succeeding: Jimmy Mason

Personal details
- Party: Republican

Leanne Gandy is an American politician. A member of the Republican Party, she is the member-elect for the 66th district of the New Mexico House of Representatives.
