= Nicole Chavez (politician) =

American politician

Member of the New Mexico House of Representatives from the 31st district
- Incumbent
- Assumed office January 1, 2025
- Preceded by: Bill Rehm

Personal details
- Party: Republican
- Website: nicolechavezfornm.com

Nicole Chavez is an American politician serving as a member of the New Mexico House of Representatives for the 31st district. She is the first Hispanic woman to serve in this seat.

In 2015, her teenage son Jaydon was killed in a drive-by shooting. This encouraged her to become a victims advocate. In 2024 she was elected to a majority female house.

== Professional career ==
Prior to her election to public office, Chavez worked in the health care sector in New Mexico. Her experience has included leadership roles related to managed care operations, product development, sales strategy, and member outreach within the state's health system.

== Political career ==
=== Election ===
Chavez was elected to the New Mexico House of Representatives in 2024, representing District 31. Her election contributed to a legislature that has seen increasing female representation in recent years.

=== Legislation ===
Chavez has sponsored and co-sponsored legislation related to public safety, taxation, and victims’ rights.

Notable legislative activity includes:

- House Bill 99 (2026) – Medical malpractice reform legislation addressing provider shortages and liability standards. The bill passed both chambers and was sent to the governor.
- House Bill 61 (2026) – Legislation increasing penalties for aggravated battery against a peace officer. The measure was enacted into law.
- House Bill 49 (2026) – Legislation addressing firearm possession by prohibited individuals.
- Senate Bill 43 (2026) – A measure related to parole procedures and victims’ rights, including notification requirements and consideration of offender conduct.
- House Bill 92 (2026) – Legislation relating to taxation that proposed expanding the Social Security income exemption for seniors. Chavez was a co-sponsor of the bill. The measure was tabled in committee and did not advance.
- House Joint Resolution 2 (2026) – A proposed constitutional amendment concerning denial of bail in certain cases. Chavez was a co-sponsor. The resolution was tabled in committee and did not advance.
- House Bill 206 (2026) – Legislation expanding eligibility under the Crime Victim Reparation Act to include additional offenses. Chavez was a sponsor of the bill. The measure passed the House unanimously before stalling in the Senate.
- House Bill 179 (2026) – Legislation addressing sealed juvenile records and pretrial detention policy. Chavez was a sponsor of the bill. The measure did not advance.

=== Advocacy ===
Chavez has been involved in advocacy efforts related to victims of violent crime and public safety policy. She has participated in memorial events and initiatives recognizing victims and supporting criminal justice reforms.

== Personal life ==
Chavez resides in Albuquerque, New Mexico. She has spoken publicly about personal experiences that have informed her focus on victims’ rights and public safety policy.

== See also ==
- New Mexico House of Representatives
- Politics of New Mexico
