= Anthony Allison (politician) =

American politician and electrician

Member of the New Mexico House of Representatives from the 4th district
- In office January 1, 2019 – January 1, 2025
- Preceded by: Sharon Clahchischilliage
- Succeeded by: Joseph Franklin Hernandez

Personal details
- Party: Democratic
- Education: Eastern New Mexico University (no degree)

Anthony Allison is an American politician and retired electrician who served as a member of the New Mexico House of Representatives from 2019-2025. Allison represented the 4th district, which includes San Juan County, New Mexico.

== Early life and education ==
Allison is a member of the Navajo Nation. After graduating from Gallup High School, Allison attended Eastern New Mexico University for two years.

== Career ==
Prior to his retirement, Allison worked as a journeyman electrician. He also founded Navajo Voters Coalition, an organization specializing in the expansion of voting rights in his district. He defeated incumbent Republican Sharon Clahchischilliage in the 2018 election and took office on January 15, 2019.
