= Catherine Cullen =

American politician

Member of the New Mexico House of Representatives from the 57th district
- Incumbent
- Assumed office January 1, 2025
- Preceded by: Jason Harper
- Succeeded by: Chriselle Martinez (elect)

Personal details
- Party: Republican
- Website: cullen4nm.com

Catherine Jeanette Cullen is an American politician serving as a member of the New Mexico House of Representatives for the 57th district.

Cullen was a Rio Rancho Public Schools Board of Education member. In 2024 she was elected to a majority female house.
