= Lori Martinez =

American politician

Member of the New Mexico House of Representatives from the 37th district
- Incumbent
- Assumed office November 10, 2026
- Preceded by: Joanne Ferrary

Personal details
- Party: Democratic

Lori Martinez is an American politician. A member of the Democratic Party, she is the member for the 37th district of the New Mexico House of Representatives. After being elected in 2026 she was appointed to fill the vacancy left by the resignation of her predecessor Joanne Ferrary.
