= Ambrose Castellano =

American politician in New Mexico, United States

Member of the New Mexico House of Representatives from the 70th district
- In office January 1, 2021 – December 31, 2024
- Preceded by: Tomás Salazar
- Succeeded by: Anita Gonzales

Personal details
- Party: Democratic

Ambrose M. Castellano is an American businessman and politician who served as a member of the New Mexico House of Representatives from the 70th district from 2021–2024.

== Early life ==
A native of Las Vegas, New Mexico, Castellano graduated from West Las Vegas High School.

== Career ==
Prior to entering politics, he worked as a general contractor and rancher. He served on the board of trustees of Luna Community College and as a member of the West Las Vegas School Board.

He is a member of the Democratic Party. In October 2020, a complaint was filed against Castellano, alleging that he did not live within the boundaries of the 70th district. The complaint also alleged that Castellano used a post office box in Serafina, New Mexico as his permanent residence.

In the June 2020 Democratic primary, Castellano narrowly defeated Anita Gonzales. In the November general election, he defeated Republican nominee Nathan Dial. He assumed office in 2021, succeeding Tomás Salazar.

Castellano ran for reelection in 2024, but lost in the Democratic primary to Anita Gonzales.
