= Tanya Mirabal Moya =

American politician

Member of the New Mexico House of Representatives from the 7th district
- Incumbent
- Assumed office January 1, 2023
- Preceded by: Kelly Fajardo
- Succeeded by: Rickie Gonzales II (elect)

Personal details
- Party: Republican
- Education: Purdue University Global (BS); Liberty University (MS)

Tanya Mirabal Moya is an American politician and educator serving as a member of the New Mexico House of Representatives for the 7th district. Elected in November 2022, she assumed office on January 1, 2023. She sought re-election in 2026, but was defeated by Rickie Gonzales II.

== Education ==
Mirabal Moya earned a Bachelor of Science in health and wellness from Purdue University Global and a Master of Science in sports management, coaching, and athletic administration from Liberty University.

Outside of politics, Mirabal Moya teaches physics and biology at Belén High School.

== Political career ==
Mirabal Moya was elected to the New Mexico House of Representatives in November 2022.

Mirabal Moya was criticized in 2026 after allegations from the progressive PAC American Bridge 21st Century that she utilized campaign funds to purchase airplane and college football tickets for a game in Ireland. New Mexico House Republican spokesperson Owen Scarpa stated that the expenses were official legislative business to attend the American Irish State Legislators Caucus, though she was the only state representative from New Mexico to utilize campaign funds to attend the conference.

The 2026 New Mexico House of Representatives election saw Mirabal Moya compete against graphic designer Rickie Gonzales II. Gonzales defeated her with 52% of the vote to Mirabal Moya's 48%, securing a supermajority for the Democrats in the state House. The district had more registered Democrats than Republicans, though Mirabal Moya had previously performed well in the district in 2022 and ran unopposed in 2024.
