= Cristina Parajón =

American politician

Member of the New Mexico House of Representatives from the 25th district
- Incumbent
- Assumed office August 11, 2023
- Preceded by: Christine Trujillo

Personal details
- Born: Albuquerque, New Mexico
- Party: Democratic
- Education: Harvard University (BA); Tsinghua University, Schwarzman Scholars (MS)
- Occupation: Politician

Cristina Parajón is an American politician currently serving in the New Mexico House of Representatives. She was appointed by the Bernalillo County Commission to represent House District 25, covering central I-40 in Bernalillo County, primarily in Albuquerque's Northeast Heights. Parajón is the second youngest female legislator in New Mexico history, following Concha Ortix Y Pino de Klevin, who was elected to the legislature in 1936 at the age of 26. She succeeded Rep. Christine Trujillo.

== Early life and education ==
Born and raised in Albuquerque, New Mexico, Parajón pursued her undergraduate studies at Harvard University, receiving a full scholarship. As a Schwarzman Scholar, she later obtained a master's degree from Tsinghua University in Beijing, China, focusing on reproductive health and gender inequalities in Nicaragua. Parajón also worked in financial management consulting prior to entering public service.

== Career ==
Before her appointment to the New Mexico House, Parajón served as the strategy director for the New Mexico Department of Human Services. She also held roles as the deputy incident commander for the emergency operations center, and the gateway administrator for Albuquerque. In her capacity as the gateway administrator, Parajón managed projects addressing homelessness in Albuquerque.

=== New Mexico House of Representatives ===
In 2023, following the resignation of Democratic lawmaker Christine Trujillo, the Bernalillo County Commission appointed Parajón to represent House District 25. Selected from a pool of seven candidates with a 4-to-1 vote, Parajón is the first Gen-Z Democrat in the New Mexico State Legislature. She will serve in this capacity until December 31, 2024.

In April 2025, Governor Michelle Lujan Grisham signed Senate Bill 16, which was cosponsored and supported by Parajón, allowing unaffiliated or independent voters to participate in major-party primaries without changing their registration. The reform, which was broadly opposed by New Mexico Republicans and a few Democrats takes effect in 2026 and aims to expand access for the state's growing number of independent voters (approx. 23% as of 2025) increasing voter participation and reducing partisan polarization.
