= Jenifer Jones =

American politician

Member of the New Mexico House of Representatives from the 32nd district
- Incumbent
- Assumed office January 1, 2023
- Preceded by: Candie Sweetser

Personal details
- Party: Republican
- Education: New Mexico Junior College (ASN)

Jenifer Marie Jones is an American politician and nurse serving as a member of the New Mexico House of Representatives for the 32nd district. Elected in November 2022, she assumed office on January 1, 2023.

== Early life and education ==
A native of Deming, New Mexico, Jones graduated from Deming High School. She earned an associate of science degree in nursing from New Mexico Junior College.

== Career ==
Jones began her career with the Lovelace Health System, specializing in home health care. She also worked at the Gila Regional Medical Center and the University of Kansas Health System. Jones was elected to the New Mexico House of Representatives in November 2022, defeating incumbent Democrat Candie Sweetser.
