= Diane Torres-Velásquez =

American politician

Member of the New Mexico House of Representatives from the 30th district
- Incumbent
- Assumed office January 1, 2025
- Preceded by: Natalie Figueroa

Personal details
- Party: Democratic
- Website: www.torres-velasquez.com

Elizabeth Diane Torres-Velasquez is an American politician. She serves as a member of the New Mexico House of Representatives for the 30th district.
