= Harlan Vincent =

American politician

Member of the New Mexico House of Representatives from the 56th district
- Incumbent
- Assumed office January 1, 2023
- Preceded by: Zachary Cook

Personal details
- Born: Clovis, New Mexico, U.S.
- Party: Republican

Harlan H. Vincent is an American politician who is a member of the New Mexico House of Representatives for the 56th district. Elected in November 2022, he assumed office on January 1, 2023.

== Career ==
Vincent served in the Ruidoso Fire Department, including as chief, until retiring in 2016. As chief, Vincent also served as commander of the Ruidoso Emergency Operation Center and chair of the Sierra Blanca Wild Land Fire Academy. He was elected to the New Mexico House of Representatives in November 2022 and will assume office on January 1, 2023.
