= Martha Garcia (New Mexico politician) =

American politician

Member of the New Mexico House of Representatives from the 6th district
- Incumbent
- Assumed office February 27, 2025
- Preceded by: Eliseo Alcon

Personal details
- Party: Democratic

Martha Garcia (born 1949 or 1950) is an American politician serving as a member of the New Mexico House of Representatives for the 6th district. She assumed office on February 27, 2025. Governor Michelle Lujan Grisham appointed her to fill the vacant seat which contains the Zuni Indian Reservation and parts of the Navajo Nation. Garcia is a former Cibola County commissioner.
