= Yanira Gurrola =

American politician

Member of the New Mexico House of Representatives from the 16th district
- Incumbent
- Assumed office January 9, 2023
- Preceded by: Marsella Duarte

Personal details
- Born: Flor Yanira Gurrola Valenzuela Chihuahua, Mexico
- Party: Democratic
- Education: Chihuahua Institute of Technology (BS); College of Santa Fe (MS)

Flor Yanira Gurrola Valenzuela is a Mexican-American politician and educator serving as a member of the New Mexico House of Representatives for the 16th district. She assumed office on January 9, 2023.

== Early life and education ==
Gurrola was born in Chihuahua, Mexico, and moved to Albuquerque, New Mexico, in 2000. She earned a Bachelor of Science in electronic industrial engineering from the Chihuahua Institute of Technology and a Master of Science in curriculum and instructional leadership from the College of Santa Fe.

== Career ==
Outside of politics, Gurrola is a bilingual math teacher. She works as a professional development coordinator and was previously a member of the board of Dual Language Education New Mexico. In January 2023, the Bernalillo County Board of Commissioners appointed Gurrola to the New Mexico House of Representatives.
