= Meredith Dixon =

American politician and businesswoman

Member of the New Mexico House of Representatives from the 20th district
- Incumbent
- Assumed office January 19, 2021
- Preceded by: Abbas Akhil

Personal details
- Born: Ossining, New York, U.S.
- Party: Democratic
- Education: Chatham University (BA); University of Pittsburgh (MA)

Meredith Dixon is an American politician and businesswoman serving as a member of the New Mexico House of Representatives from the 20th district. Elected in 2020, she assumed office on January 19, 2021.

== Early life and education ==
Dixon was born in Ossining, New York. She earned a Bachelor of Arts degree from Chatham University in 1999 and a Master of Arts from the University of Pittsburgh in 2002.

== Career ==
Dixon is the founder of Blue Advantage Partners, a political consulting and fundraising firm based in New Mexico. Dixon previously worked as an aide for Senator Tom Udall and State House Speaker Brian Egolf. After incumbent Democrat Abbas Akhil announced that he would not seek re-election in 2020, Dixon declared her candidacy to succeed him. Dixon defeated Republican nominee Michael Hendricks in the November general election and assumed office in January 2021.
