= Mark Duncan (politician) =

American politician

Member of the New Mexico House of Representatives from the 2nd district
- Incumbent
- Assumed office January 1, 2023
- Preceded by: James Strickler

Personal details
- Party: Republican

Mark Duncan is an American politician who has served as a Republican member of the New Mexico House of Representatives from the 2nd district since 2023.
