= Debra M. Sariñana =

American educator and politician

Debra Sariñana

Member of the New Mexico House of Representatives from the 21st district
- Incumbent
- Assumed office January 2017
- Preceded by: Idalia Lechuga-Tena

Personal details
- Born: Albuquerque, New Mexico, U.S.
- Party: Democratic
- Education: New Mexico State University (BS); University of New Mexico (MA)

Military service
- Branch/service: United States Air Force

Debra Marie Sariñana is an American educator and politician serving as a member of the New Mexico House of Representatives from the 21st district, which includes a portion of Bernalillo County.

== Early life and education ==
Sariñana was born and raised in Albuquerque, New Mexico and graduated from Manzano High School in 1978. She earned a Bachelor of Science degree in education from New Mexico State University in 1983 and a Master of Arts in mathematics education from the University of New Mexico in 2007.

== Career ==
Sariñana served in the United States Air Force Reserves from 1984 to 1990 as a medical service specialist. Prior to entering politics, she was a math teacher at Manzano High School. In the November 8, 2016 Democratic primary for the 21st district of the New Mexico House of Representatives, Sariñana defeated incumbent Idalia Lechuga-Tena. She took office in January 2017.
