= Randall Pettigrew =

American politician

Member of the New Mexico House of Representatives from the 61st district
- Incumbent
- Assumed office January 19, 2021
- Preceded by: David Gallegos

Personal details
- Party: Republican
- Spouse: Shannon
- Children: 3
- Education: New Mexico State University (BS)

Randall T. Pettigrew is an American politician, businessman, and engineer serving as a member of the New Mexico House of Representatives from the 61st district. Elected in 2020, he assumed office on January 19, 2021.

== Education ==
Pettigrew earned a Bachelor of Science degree in civil engineering from New Mexico State University.

== Career ==
For 20 years, he worked as a corporate executive before founding his own construction and engineering company, Pettigrew & Associates. In 2020, Pettigrew declared his candidacy for district 61 in the New Mexico House of Representatives after incumbent Republican David Gallegos decided to run for the New Mexico Senate. Pettigrew was unopposed in the November general election. He assumed office on January 19, 2021.

== Personal life ==
Pettigrew is married to Shannon Pettigrew, a businesswoman. They have three children. Pettigrew lives in Lovington, New Mexico.
