= Janelle Anyanonu =

American politician

Member of the New Mexico House of Representatives from the 19th district
- Incumbent
- Assumed office January 1, 2023
- Preceded by: Kay Bounkeua

Personal details
- Party: Democratic
- Education: Wayland Baptist University (BS)

Janelle Anyanonu is an American politician serving as a member of the New Mexico House of Representatives for the 19th district. Elected in November 2022, she assumed office on January 1, 2023.

== Early life and education ==
The daughter of a Nigerian immigrant, Anyanonu was raised in Albuquerque, New Mexico. She graduated from Manzano High School and earned a Bachelor of Science degree in applied sciences from Wayland Baptist University.

== Career ==
Anyanonu worked as an office manager and served as a member of the New Mexico Black Central Organizing Committee. A 2020 graduate of the Emerge America program in New Mexico, Anyanonu was elected to the New Mexico House of Representatives in November 2022. In her first legislative session, Anyanonu was among the five legislators who successfully carried the Reproductive and Gender-Affirming Health Care Freedom Act, which protected abortion and gender-affirming care in the state. It was signed into law on March 13, 2023.
