= Doreen Gallegos =

American politician

Majority Leader of the New Mexico House of Representatives
- Acting
- In office July 30, 2021 – August 10, 2021
- Preceded by: Sheryl Williams Stapleton
- Succeeded by: Javier Martínez

Member of the New Mexico House of Representatives from the 52nd district
- Incumbent
- Assumed office January 2013
- Preceded by: Joe Cervantes

Personal details
- Party: Democratic
- Education: New Mexico State University (BA, MSW)
- Website: Official website

Doreen Ybarra Gallegos is an American politician who has served as a member of the New Mexico House of Representatives since 2013. Gallegos is the executive director of Mesilla Valley CASA, a program that helps foster children.

She is a member of the Democratic Party.

New Mexico House of Representatives
Preceded by Sheryl Williams Stapleton	Majority Leader of the New Mexico House of Representatives; Acting; 2021	Succeeded by Javier Martínez
