= Bill Hall (New Mexico politician) =

American politician

Member of the New Mexico House of Representatives from the 3rd district
- Incumbent
- Assumed office April 4, 2024
- Preceded by: T. Ryan Lane

Personal details
- Party: Republican

William (Bill) A. Hall II is an American politician who has served as a Republican member of the New Mexico House of Representatives from the 3rd district since 2024.

He is a graduate of Farmington High School and New Mexico State University. He is a former FBI agent.
