= Jonathan Henry (politician) =

American politician

Member of the New Mexico House of Representatives from the 54th district
- Incumbent
- Assumed office January 1, 2025
- Preceded by: James G. Townsend

Personal details
- Born: Cloudcroft, New Mexico
- Party: Republican

Jonathan "Jon" Allen Henry is an American politician who has served as a Republican member of the New Mexico House of Representatives from the 54th district since 2024.

Henry served as mayor of Artesia and an Eddy County Commissioner.
