= Alan Martinez =

American politician

Member of the New Mexico House of Representatives from the 23rd district
- Incumbent
- Assumed office January 1, 2023
- Preceded by: Constituency established

Personal details
- Born: Española, New Mexico, U.S.
- Party: Republican
- Education: Southern Arizona Bible College (BA)

Alan T. Martinez is an American politician serving as a member of the New Mexico House of Representatives for the 23rd district. Elected in November 2022, he assumed office on January 1, 2023.

Martinez is married to the former Allison Pool, together they have 6 children.

== Early life and education ==
Martinez was born in Española, New Mexico. He graduated from Española Valley High School in 1982 and attended Cochise Junior College Cochise College. Martinez earned a Bachelor of Arts degree in education and religion from Southern Arizona Bible College in 1986.

== Career ==
Martinez worked as the manager of Rio Grand Sales from 1988 to 1990. He then served in the New Mexico Department of Veterans' Services for 25 years, including as file clerk, benefits director, policy director, and legislative director. He retired in 2018 as deputy director of the department.

Martinez was elected as the House Minority Whip in April 2024 during his first term.

== Political positions ==
=== Medical malpractice ===
Martinez, who sits on the House Health & Human Services Committee, has been critical of medical malpractice laws in New Mexico. During the 2026 session, Martinez criticized amendments proposed by Democrats on H.B. 99. The amendment to the bill made it so that doctors, but not for corporately owned hospitals, would have set caps of punitive damages in malpractice cases.
