= Angelita Mejia =

American politician

Member of the New Mexico House of Representatives from the 58th district
- Incumbent
- Assumed office January 1, 2025
- Preceded by: Candy Ezzell

Personal details
- Party: Republican

Angelita Mejia is an American politician serving as a member of the New Mexico House of Representatives for the 58th district.

Mejia is a former congressional staffer and local business owner from Dexter, New Mexico.
