= Andrea Reeb =

American attorney and politician

Member of the New Mexico House of Representatives from the 64th district
- In office January 1, 2023 – October 15, 2026
- Preceded by: Randal Crowder

Personal details
- Born: Ann Arbor, Michigan, U.S.
- Party: Republican
- Education: Creighton University (BA, JD)

Andrea Rowley Reeb is an American attorney and politician who was a member of the New Mexico House of Representatives for the 64th district. Elected in November 2022, she assumed office on January 1, 2023 and served until her resignation on October 15, 2026.

== Early life and education ==
Reeb was born in Ann Arbor, Michigan, and raised in Clovis, New Mexico. After graduating from Clovis High School in 1989, she earned a Bachelor of Arts degree from Creighton University and a Juris Doctor from the Creighton University School of Law.

== Career ==
Reeb was elected district attorney for New Mexico's Ninth Judicial District in 2014 and served until March 2022. She was elected to the New Mexico House of Representatives in November 2022 and assumed office on January 1, 2023.

Reeb was appointed in August 2022 as a special prosecutor by Santa Fe County's district attorney Mary Carmack-Altwies to assist in the investigation and prosecution of the shooting incident on the set of the film Rust, in which prosecutors said they would charge actor Alec Baldwin with two counts of involuntary manslaughter. In February 2023, prosecutors reduced the charges after Baldwin's attorneys successfully argued that prosecutors had charged him under a law which hadn't existed at the time the shooting occurred. An attorney for Baldwin's co-defendant said Reeb's comments from June 2022 present a "troubling picture of a prosecution that worried less about the law and facts than they did about wanting the limelight for personal political purposes." In an email to Mary Carmack-Altwies, the district attorney of Santa Fe County who appointed her, Reeb wrote, "At some point though I'd at least like to get out there that I am assisting you … as it might help in my campaign lol." Another Baldwin attorney, Luke Nikas, wrote: "Representative Reeb's prosecution of this case against Mr. Baldwin to advance her political career is a further abuse of the system and yet another violation of Mr. Baldwin’s constitutional rights." Baldwin's lawyers challenged Reeb's appointment though supervising prosecutors initially supported her role in the case. She recused herself, two weeks before a judge was expected to rule on whether or not she should be disqualified. Baldwin's attorney had petitioned to remove her because her new position as a legislator could violate the New Mexico constitution's separation of powers clause. On April 21, 2023, charges against Baldwin were dropped by prosecutors who had been appointed to replace Reeb.

Baldwin in 2025 sued Reeb and the other prosecutors. Judge Kea W. Riggs of the United States District Court for the District of New Mexico on October 14, 2026, ruled that Reeb's appointment as a special prosecutor while she was still serving as a state legislator violated the separation of powers in the New Mexico Constitution. Reeb resigned her House seat the next day. However, after being re-elected to the seat in November 2026 she has indicated that she will rejoin the chamber after moving to private legal practice.
