= Kristina Ortez =

American politician from New Mexico

Member of the New Mexico House of Representatives from the 42nd district
- Incumbent
- Assumed office January 19, 2021
- Preceded by: Daniel R. Barrone

Personal details
- Party: Democratic
- Education: Harvard University (AB); University of New Mexico (MPA)

Kristina Ortez is an American politician and non-profit executive serving as a member of the New Mexico House of Representatives from the 42nd district. Elected in 2020, she assumed office on January 19, 2021.

== Early life and education ==
Ortez was raised in farming community in the San Joaquin Valley. In 1989, she attended UC Davis' Young Scholars Program and went on to earn a Bachelor of Arts from Harvard University and a Master of Public Administration from the University of New Mexico.

== Career ==
Prior to entering politics, Ortez worked as the executive director of the Taos Land Trust.

After incumbent Democratic representative Roberto Gonzales was nominated to the New Mexico Senate by Michelle Lujan Grisham, he was replaced by Taos Mayor Daniel R. Barrone. Barrone later announced that he would not seek a full term in the House in 2020, and Ortez declared her candidacy to succeed him. In the June Democratic primary, she defeated Mark Gallegos. In the November general election, she defeated Republican Linda Calhoun. She assumed office in January 2021.
