= Brian Baca =

American politician

Member of the New Mexico House of Representatives from the 8th district
- Incumbent
- Assumed office January 13, 2022
- Preceded by: Alonzo Baldonado

Personal details
- Party: Republican
- Education: University of New Mexico (BS, MA)

Brian Baca is an American politician and educator serving as a member of the New Mexico House of Representatives from the 8th district. He was appointed to the House by the Valencia County Board of Commissioners on January 13, 2022, succeeding Alonzo Baldonado.

== Early life and education ==
A native of Los Lunas, New Mexico, Baca attended Los Lunas High School. He earned a Bachelor of Science degree in psychology and Master of Arts in educational leadership from the University of New Mexico.

== Career ==
From 1994 to 2001, Baca worked as a teacher at White Mountain Intermediate School in Ruidoso, New Mexico. He taught in the gifted and talented program at Daniel Fernandez Intermediate School from 2001 to 2005. In 2005 and 2006, he was assistant principal of Manzano Vista Middle School. He served as director of special education for Los Lunas Public Schools from 2007 to 2011, director of personnel until 2012, and assistant superintendent from 2012 to 2018. Baca has served as deputy superintendent of Los Lunas Public Schools since 2018. He is also a member of the American Association of School Personnel Administrators. He was appointed to the New Mexico House of Representatives by members of the Valencia County Board of Commissioners on January 13, 2022, succeeding Alonzo Baldonado.
