= Michelle Paulene Abeyta =

American politician

Member of the New Mexico House of Representatives from the 69th district
- Incumbent
- Assumed office January 1, 2025
- Preceded by: Harry Garcia

Personal details
- Party: Democratic
- Website: www.abeytafornm.com/home

Michelle Paulene Abeyta is an American politician serving as a member of the New Mexico House of Representatives for the 69th district.

== Biography ==
Abeyta is a resident of the To'Hajiilee Navajo Chapter. She is of Native American descent.
