= Anita Gonzales =

American politician

Member of the New Mexico House of Representatives from the 70th district
- Incumbent
- Assumed office January 1, 2025
- Preceded by: Ambrose Castellano

Personal details
- Born: Las Vegas, New Mexico
- Party: Democratic
- Website: anita4newmexico.com

Anita Amalia Gonzales is an American politician serving as a member of the New Mexico House of Representatives for the 70th district.

== Biography ==
Gonzales was born in Las Vegas, New Mexico. In 2024, she unseated Ambrose Castellano in the Democratic primary.
