= Kathleen Cates =

American politician

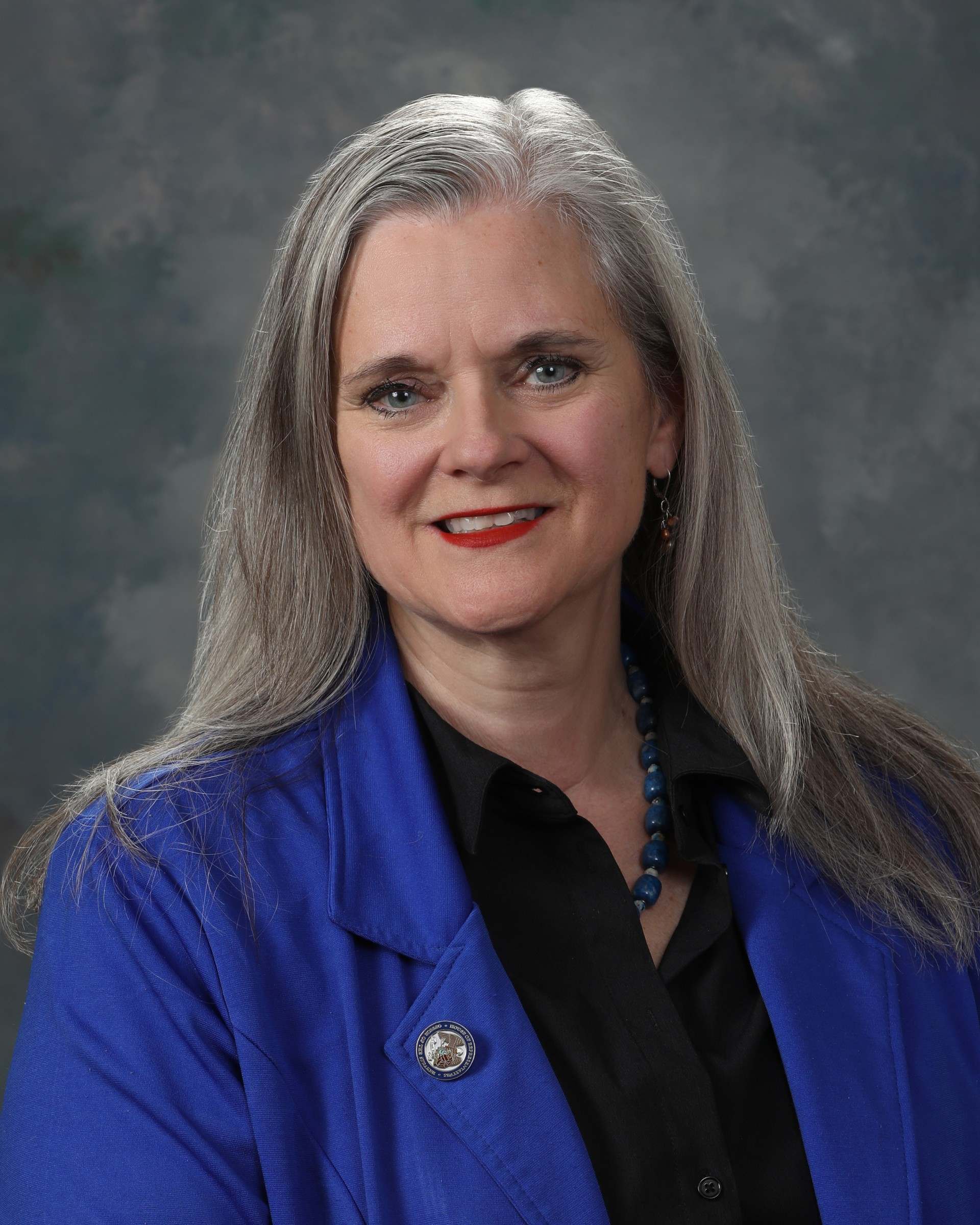
- Cates in 2024

Member of the New Mexico House of Representatives from the 44th district
- Incumbent
- Assumed office January 1, 2023
- Preceded by: Jane Powdrell-Culbert

Personal details
- Party: Democratic

Kathleen M. Cates is an American politician serving as a member of the New Mexico House of Representatives for the 44th district. Elected in November 2022, she assumed office on January 1, 2023.

== Career ==
Prior to entering politics, Cates worked for a jewelry company, and as an e-commerce manager for Goodwill Industries of New Mexico. She also worked as the CEO of LifeROOTS from 2011-2021, a non-profit focused on providing resources to people with disabilities. Since 2021, Cates has also worked as a realtor. She was elected to the New Mexico House of Representatives in November 2022.

In the 2025 legislative session, Cates served as vice chair on the Agriculture, Acequias, and Water Resources committee, as well as a member on the Health & Human Services committee.
