= Sarah Silva =

American politician

Member of the New Mexico House of Representatives from the 53rd district
- Incumbent
- Assumed office January 1, 2025
- Preceded by: Willie Madrid

Personal details
- Born: Vado, New Mexico
- Party: Democratic
- Education: University of San Francisco
- Website: www.newmexicansforsarah.com

Sarah Silva is an American politician serving as a member of the New Mexico House of Representatives for the 53rd district.

== Biography ==
Silva was born in Vado and raised in the Mesilla Valley. She graduated from the University of San Francisco. Silva is a community organizer. She is a leadership team of the Native Land Institute.
