= Jimmy Mason (politician) =

American politician

Member of the New Mexico House of Representatives from the 66th district
- Incumbent
- Assumed office January 1, 2023
- Preceded by: Phelps Anderson
- Succeeded by: Leanne Gandy (elect)

Personal details
- Party: Republican

Jimmy G. Mason is an American politician and businessman who has served as a Republican member of the New Mexico House of Representatives from the 66th district since 2023. He is from Artesia, New Mexico.
