= Cynthia Borrego =

American politician from New Mexico

Member of the New Mexico House of Representatives from the 17th district
- Incumbent
- Assumed office January 1, 2023
- Preceded by: Constituency established

Member of the Albuquerque City Council from the 5th district
- In office 2017–2021
- Preceded by: Dan Lewis
- Succeeded by: Dan Lewis

Personal details
- Party: Democratic
- Education: University of New Mexico (BS, MPA)

Cynthia D. Borrego is an American politician serving as a member of the New Mexico House of Representatives for the 17th district. Elected in November 2022, she assumed office on January 1, 2023.

== Early life and education ==
Borrego is a native of New Mexico. She earned a Bachelor of Science in education and Master of Public Administration from the University of New Mexico.

== Career ==
Outside of politics, Borrego operates a small business. She served as a member of the Albuquerque City Council from 2017 to 2021. She was also a member of the Board of Directors of the Albuquerque Metropolitan Arroyo Flood Control Authority and The Middle Rio Grande Council of Governments. She is a professional planner, retired from the Albuquerque City Planning Department. Borrego was elected to the New Mexico House of Representatives in November 2022.
