= Tara Lujan =

American politician

Member of the New Mexico House of Representatives from the 48th district
- Incumbent
- Assumed office August 2020
- Preceded by: Linda Trujillo

Personal details
- Party: Democratic

Tara Lujan is an American politician serving as a member of the New Mexico House of Representatives from the 48th district. Lujan was appointed to the House by the Santa Fe County Commission on July 23, 2020 after the resignation of Linda Trujillo.

== Background ==
Lujan is a native of Santa Fe, New Mexico. Prior to her nomination to the House, Lujan served as the human resources director of the New Mexico State Treasurer's Office. Lujan also worked as a campaign manager for Ben Ray Luján (no relation). Lujan was the Democratic nominee for the New Mexico House in 2020, running unopposed in the general election.
