= Charlotte Little =

American politician

Member of the New Mexico House of Representatives from the 68th district
- Incumbent
- Assumed office January 1, 2023
- Preceded by: Karen C. Bash

Personal details
- Party: Democratic
- Education: University of New Mexico (BA)

Charlotte Little is an American politician serving as a member of the New Mexico House of Representatives for the 68th district. She narrowly won election in the 2022 house election against Republican Robert Moss, who she beat by 35 votes following a recount. Little is a member of the San Felipe Pueblo.

== See also ==
- List of Native American politicians
- Native American women in politics
