= Marianna Anaya =

American politician

Member of the New Mexico House of Representatives from the 18th district
- Incumbent
- Assumed office January 1, 2025
- Preceded by: Gail Chasey

Personal details
- Born: Albuquerque, New Mexico
- Party: Democratic
- Website: www.mariannafornm.com

Marianna Anaya is an American politician serving as a member of the New Mexico House of Representatives for the 18th district.

== Biography ==
Marianna Anaya was born and raised in Albuquerque, New Mexico by her mother, grandmother and eight aunts. She has worked as a lobbyist and community organizer. She is a queer woman of color. Anaya is of Chicano heritage and uses she/they pronouns.

== Political positions ==
=== Gun control ===
Anaya is a supporter of gun control. In the wake of the 2025 University of New Mexico shooting, Anaya stated that "This heartbreaking incident is yet another reminder of the urgent need to address gun violence and historical trauma in our state."
