= Joseph Franklin Hernandez =

American politician

Member of the New Mexico House of Representatives from the 4th district
- Incumbent
- Assumed office January 1, 2025
- Preceded by: Anthony Allison

Personal details
- Party: Democratic Party
- Education: Shiprock High School

Joseph Franklin Hernandez is an American politician and community organizer who is a Democratic member of the New Mexico House of Representatives, representing the 4th district. The district is entirely based in San Juan County and includes the community of Shiprock, as well as part of Farmington.

== Early life and education ==
Hernandez was born and raised in Shiprock. He graduated from Shiprock High School in 2006. He earned awards for organizing the vote in the Navajo Nation.

== Political views ==
=== Abortion ===
Hernandez supports access to abortion, and was endorsed by Planned Parenthood in 2024.

=== Radiation exposure ===
Hernandez was a co-sponsor of House Memorial 15, a proposal to endorse the renewal of the Radiation Exposure Compensation Act.
