= New Mexico House of Representatives =

Lower house of New Mexico's state legislature

Coordinates: 35.6820°N 105.9397°W

New Mexico House of Representatives Cámara de representantes de Nuevo México
- New Mexico State Legislature

Type
- Type: Lower house
- Term limits: None

History
- New session started: January 21, 2025

Leadership
- Speaker: Javier Martínez (D) since January 17, 2023
- Majority Leader: Reena Szczepanski (D) since January 21, 2025
- Minority Leader: Gail Armstrong (R) since January 21, 2025

Structure
- Seats: 70
- Political groups: Majority: Democratic (44); Minority: Republican (26)
- Length of term: 2 years
- Authority: Article IV, New Mexico Constitution
- Salary: None + per diem

Elections
- Last election: November 5, 2024 (70 seats)
- Next election: November 3, 2026 (70 seats)
- Redistricting: Legislative Control

Meeting place
- House of Representatives Chamber; New Mexico State Capitol; Santa Fe, New Mexico

Website
- www.nmlegis.gov

The New Mexico House of Representatives (Spanish: Cámara de representantes de Nuevo México) is the lower house of the New Mexico State Legislature.

There are 70 members of the House. Each member represents roughly 25,980 residents of New Mexico.

The most recent elections were held on November 5, 2024. During that election the Republican Party of New Mexico picked up one seat.

== Composition ==
	Party (Shading indicates majority caucus)			Total	Vacant
	Democratic	Independent	Republican	Total	Vacant
End 2010	42	0	28	70	0
Begin 2011	37	0	33	70	0
End 2012	36	1	33	70	0
2013-2014	37	0	33	70	0
2015-2016	33	0	37	70	0
2017-2018	38	0	32	70	0
Begin 2019	46	0	24	70	0
End 2020	43	0	24	67	3
Begin 2021	45	0	25	70	0
February 6, 2021	45	1	24	70	0
Begin 2023	45	0	25	70	0
Latest voting share	64%	0%	36%		

== Leadership ==
Position	Representative	Party	District
Speaker of the House of Representantes	Javier Martínez	Dem	11
Majority Floor Leader	Reena Szczepanski	Dem	47
Majority Whip	Dayan Hochman-Vigil	Dem	15
Minority Floor Leader	Gail Armstrong	Rep	49
Minority Whip	Alan Martinez	Rep	23

== Current members ==
District	Name	Party	Residence	Start
1	Rod Montoya	Rep	Farmington	2014
2	Mark Duncan	Rep	Farmington	2022
3	Bill Hall	Rep	Aztec	2024 (Note: Originally appointed.)
4	Joseph Franklin Hernandez	Dem	Shiprock	2024
5	Doreen Wonda Johnson	Dem	Church Rock	2014
6	Martha Garcia	Dem	Pine Hill	2025
7	Tanya Mirabal Moya	Rep	Los Lunas	2022
8	Brian Baca	Rep	Los Lunas	2022
9	Patricia Lundstrom	Dem	Gallup	2000
10	G. Andrés Romero	Dem	Albuquerque	2014
11	Javier Martínez	Dem	Albuquerque	2014
12	Art De La Cruz (Note: De La Cruz previously served in the state house from 2020–2021.)	Dem	Albuquerque	2022
13	Patricia Roybal Caballero	Dem	Albuquerque	2004
14	Miguel Garcia	Dem	Albuquerque	1996
15	Dayan Hochman-Vigil	Dem	Albuquerque	2018
16	Yanira Gurrola	Dem	Albuquerque	2023
17	Cynthia Borrego	Dem	Albuquerque	2022
18	Marianna Anaya	Dem	Albuquerque	2024
19	Janelle Anyanonu	Dem	Albuquerque	2022
20	Meredith Dixon	Dem	Albuquerque	2020
21	Debra M. Sariñana	Dem	Albuquerque	2016
22	Stefani Lord	Rep	Tijeras	2020
23	Alan Martinez	Rep	Bernalillo	2022
24	Elizabeth Thomson (Note: Thomson previously served in the state house from 2013–2015.)	Dem	Albuquerque	2016
25	Cristina Parajón	Dem	Albuquerque	2023
26	Eleanor Chávez (Note: Chávez previously served in the state house from 2009–2013.)	Dem	Albuquerque	2022
27	Marian Matthews	Dem	Albuquerque	2019
28	Pamelya Herndon	Dem	Albuquerque	2021
29	Joy Garratt	Dem	Albuquerque	2018
30	Diane Torres-Velásquez	Dem	Albuquerque	2024
31	Nicole Chavez	Rep	Albuquerque	2024
32	Jenifer Jones	Rep	Deming	2022
33	Micaela Lara Cadena	Dem	Mesilla	2018
34	Raymundo Lara	Dem	La Mesa	2018
35	Angelica Rubio	Dem	Las Cruces	2016
36	Nathan Small	Dem	Las Cruces	2016
37	Lori Martinez	Dem	Las Cruces	2026
38	Rebecca Dow	Rep	Truth or Consequences	2024
39	Luis Terrazas	Rep	Bayard	2020
40	Joseph Sanchez (Note: Sanchez previously served in the state house from 2019–2021.)	Dem	Alcalde	2022
41	Yolanda Jaramillo	Dem	Dixon	2026
42	Kristina Ortez	Dem	Taos	2020
43	Christine Chandler	Dem	Los Alamos	2018
44	Kathleen Cates	Dem	Rio Rancho	2022
45	Linda Serrato	Dem	Santa Fe	2020
46	Andrea Romero	Dem	Pojoaque	2018
47	Reena Szczepanski	Dem	Santa Fe	2022
48	Tara Lujan	Dem	Santa Fe	2020
49	Gail Armstrong	Rep	Magdalena	2017
50	Matthew McQueen	Dem	Eldorado	2014
51	John Block	Rep	Alamogordo	2022
52	Doreen Gallegos	Dem	Las Cruces	2012
53	Sarah Silva	Dem	Las Cruces	2024
54	Jonathan Henry	Rep	Artesia	2024
55	Cathrynn Brown	Rep	Carlsbad	2010
56	Harlan Vincent	Rep	Glencoe	2022
57	Catherine Cullen	Rep	Rio Rancho	2024
58	Angelita Mejia	Rep	Dexter	2024
59	Mark Murphy	Rep	Roswell	2025
60	Joshua Hernandez	Rep	Rio Rancho	2020
61	Randall Pettigrew	Rep	Lovington	2020
62	Elaine Sena Cortez	Rep	Hobbs	2024
63	Martin R. Zamora	Rep	Santa Rosa	2018
64	Vacant (Note: Andrea Reeb (District 64) resigned on October 15, 2026.)	Rep		
65	Derrick Lente	Dem	Sandia Pueblo	2016
66	Jimmy Mason	Rep	Artesia	2022
67	Jack Chatfield	Rep	Mosquero	2018
68	Charlotte Little	Dem	Albuquerque	2022
69	Michelle Paulene Abeyta	Dem	To'Hajiilee	2024
70	Anita Gonzales	Dem	Las Vegas	2024

== Past composition of the House of Representatives ==
(The party control table shows the balance of power after each recent general election. The preceding Makeup table includes results of special elections since the last general election.)

Years	Democrats	Republicans	Independents
2001–2002	42	28	0
2003–2004	43	27	0
2005–2006	42	28	0
2007–2008	42	28	0
2009–2010	45	25	0
2011–2012	36	33	1
2013	38	32	0
2014	37	33	0
2015–2016	33	37	0
2017–2018	38	32	0
2019–2020	46	24	0
2021–2022	45	24	1
2023–2024	45	25	0
2025–2026	43	26	1

== See also ==
- New Mexico Legislature
- New Mexico Senate
