= 2022 United States House of Representatives elections in New Mexico =

- November 8, 2022

All 3 New Mexico seats to the United States House of Representatives
	Majority party	Minority party
Party	Democratic	Republican
Last election	2	1
Seats won	3	0
Seat change	▲1	▼1
Popular vote	387,665	316,352
Percentage	55.06%	44.93%
Swing	▲0.20%	▼0.19%

Democratic
50–60%
60–70%
70–80%
80–90%
Republican
50–60%
60–70%
70–80%
80–90%

The 2022 United States House of Representatives elections in New Mexico were held on November 8, 2022, to elect the three U.S. representatives from the state of New Mexico, one from each of the state's three congressional districts. The elections coincided with the New Mexico gubernatorial election and various state and local elections. The Democratic party gained the 2nd Congressional seat, gaining unitary control of New Mexico's Congressional (House and Senate) delegation for the first time since 2018 and improving the advantage in the House delegation for New Mexico from 2–1 in favor of Democrats to 3–0.

== Redistricting ==
=== Process ===
In New Mexico, legislative and congressional maps must be passed by the state legislature and are subject to a veto by the governor, which would require a two-thirds supermajority in each house of the legislature to override. In April 2021, governor Michelle Lujan Grisham signed a bill passed by the legislature that established the seven-member New Mexico Citizen Redistricting Committee. The job of the committee is to draw three sets of legislative and congressional maps, which it then sends to the legislature for consideration. Current public officials and government employees are barred from serving on the committee. The committee's role is purely advisory and the legislature is free to alter or discard its proposals.

On October 15, 2021, the redistricting committee voted to send 3 congressional maps to the legislature. The first would largely maintain the boundaries of the state's existing map. The second would increase Native American representation in the 3rd congressional district to nearly 20% and Hispanic representation in the 2nd district to 54%. This proposal was championed by the committee's chairman Edward Chávez, former Chief Justice of the New Mexico Supreme Court. The third, drawn by the Center for Civic Policy, would add liberal areas of the city of Albuquerque to the rural 2nd district.

=== Targeting of the 2nd district ===
In the leadup to the 2020 redistricting cycle, some suspected that the Democratic-controlled state legislature might alter the boundaries of the 2nd congressional district to make it more favorable to the Democratic Party. The 2nd district was represented by Democrat Xochitl Torres Small after she defeated Republican Yvette Herrell in the 2018 midterm elections, but she lost to Herrell in a 2020 rematch. The day after Herrell's victory, Democrat Brian Egolf, the Speaker of the New Mexico House of Representatives, pointed out that the 2nd district would inevitably be changed during redistricting and said "we'll have to see what that means for Republican chances to hold it." This statement was criticized by Steve Pearce, the chair of the New Mexico Republican Party, who called it "political tricks."

The district is mostly rural and dominated by the oil and natural gas industry. Carlsbad mayor Dale Janway expressed concern that portions of the Albuquerque suburbs might be added to the district, which would dilute the influence of the rural communities in the district, including Carlsbad. After the 2020 elections, the district held a Partisan Voting Index of R+8.

=== Legislature's map ===
On December 10, the New Mexico Senate voted 25–15 to approve a congressional map drawn by Democratic state senator Joseph Cervantes. This proposal largely resembles the third map submitted by the commission, adding portions of western and southern Albuquerque to the 2nd district and moving a portion of the conservative-leaning, oil-producing area of the 2nd district into the 3rd district. These changes would increase the Hispanic majority in the 2nd district from 51% to 56% and decrease the percentage of Native Americans in the 3rd district from 20% to 16%. Republicans widely opposed the map, with GOP state senator David Gallegos pointing out that the map combines the conservative oilfield town of Hobbs with heavily Democratic Santa Fe, which is hundreds of miles away, and GOP senator Cliff Pirtle claiming that the map represented an attempt by Democrats to control all 3 of New Mexico's House seats. Cervantes defended his map, saying he wished to "reimagine a New Mexico where our districts include rural and urban areas." The New Mexico House of Representatives passed the map on December 12 in a 44–24 vote, and governor Lujan Grisham approved it on December 17.

Dave Wasserman of Cook Political Report interpreted the new map as an attempt by Democrats to target Herrell while still protecting the representative of the 3rd district, Democrat Teresa Leger Fernandez. Under the new map, in the 2020 presidential election, Democrat Joe Biden would have won the 1st district by 14.5%, the 2nd by under 6%, and the 3rd by roughly 11%. Under the previous map, Biden won the first district by 22.8% and the 3rd district by 17.6%, and lost the 2nd district to Republican Donald Trump by 11.8%.

== Overview ==
=== District ===
District	Democratic		Republican		Others		Total		Result
District	Votes	%	Votes	%	Votes	%	Votes	%	Result
District 1	156,462	55.75%	124,151	44.23%	58	0.02%	280,671	100.00%	Democratic hold
District 2	96,986	50.34%	95,636	49.64%	51	0.03%	192,673	100.00%	Democratic gain
District 3	134,217	58.16%	96,565	41.84%	0	0.00%	230,782	100.00%	Democratic hold
Total	387,665	55.06%	316,352	44.93%	109	0.02%	704,126	100.00%	

Popular vote
Democratic	55.06%
Republican	44.93%
Other	0.02%

House seats
Democratic	100.00%

=== County ===
County	Democratic		Republican		Other		Margin		Total
County	#	%	#	%	#	%	#	%	Total
Bernalillo	146,416	60.41%	95,902	39.57%	53	0.02%	50,514	20.84%	242,371
Catron	493	24.77%	1,497	75.23%	0	0.00%	-1,004	-50.45%	1,990
Chaves	4,695	29.00%	11,492	71.00%	0	0.00%	-6,797	-41.99%	16,187
Cibola	3,514	52.32%	3,200	47.64%	3	0.04%	314	4.67%	6,717
Colfax	2,406	49.39%	2,465	50.61%	0	0.00%	-59	-1.21%	4,871
Curry	2,831	27.89%	7,320	72.11%	0	0.00%	-4,489	-44.22%	10,151
De Baca	211	29.18%	512	70.82%	0	0.00%	-301	-41.63%	723
Doña Ana	32,248	56.37%	24,943	43.60%	17	0.03%	7,305	12.77%	57,208
Eddy	3,830	23.16%	12,703	76.83%	1	0.01%	-8,873	-53.67%	16,534
Grant	6,290	54.33%	5,281	45.61%	7	0.06%	1,009	8.71%	11,578
Guadalupe	937	55.87%	740	44.13%	0	0.00%	197	11.75%	1,677
Harding	163	40.05%	244	59.95%	0	0.00%	-81	-19.90%	407
Hidalgo	645	40.93%	931	59.07%	0	0.00%	-286	-18.15%	1,576
Lea	2,537	18.29%	11,334	81.70%	2	0.01%	-8,797	-63.41%	13,873
Lincoln	2,486	30.14%	5,762	69.85%	1	0.01%	-3,276	-39.71%	8,249
Los Alamos	6,472	64.26%	3,600	35.74%	0	0.00%	2,872	28.51%	10,072
Luna	2,563	44.20%	3,236	55.80%	0	0.00%	-673	-11.61%	5,799
McKinley	13,213	69.64%	5,761	30.36%	0	0.00%	7,452	39.27%	18,974
Mora	1,799	74.62%	612	25.38%	0	0.00%	1,187	49.23%	2,411
Otero	6,054	34.74%	11,366	65.23%	5	0.03%	-5,312	-30.48%	17,425
Quay	939	31.45%	2,047	68.55%	0	0.00%	-1,108	-37.11%	2,986
Rio Arriba	9,052	70.94%	3,708	29.06%	0	0.00%	5,344	41.88%	12,760
Roosevelt	1,300	28.18%	3,313	71.82%	0	0.00%	-2,013	-43.64%	4,613
San Juan	14,412	36.43%	25,150	63.57%	0	0.00%	-10,738	-27.14%	39,562
San Miguel	7,318	77.78%	2,091	22.22%	0	0.00%	5,227	55.55%	9,409
Sandoval	32,029	52.90%	28,508	47.08%	13	0.02%	3,521	5.82%	60,550
Santa Fe	54,068	78.10%	15,164	21.90%	0	0.00%	38,904	56.19%	69,232
Sierra	1,891	38.89%	2,970	61.09%	1	0.02%	-1,079	-22.19%	4,862
Socorro	3,092	51.56%	2,905	48.44%	0	0.00%	187	3.12%	5,997
Taos	10,741	81.08%	2,507	18.92%	0	0.00%	8,234	62.15%	13,248
Torrance	1,795	32.81%	3,675	67.17%	1	0.02%	-1,880	-34.36%	5,471
Union	381	26.08%	1,080	73.92%	0	0.00%	-699	-47.84%	1,461
Valencia	10,844	43.06%	14,333	56.92%	5	0.02%	-3,489	-13.86%	25,182
Totals	387,665	55.06%	316,352	44.93%	109	0.02%	71,313	10.13%	704,126

== District 1 ==
2022 New Mexico's 1st congressional district election
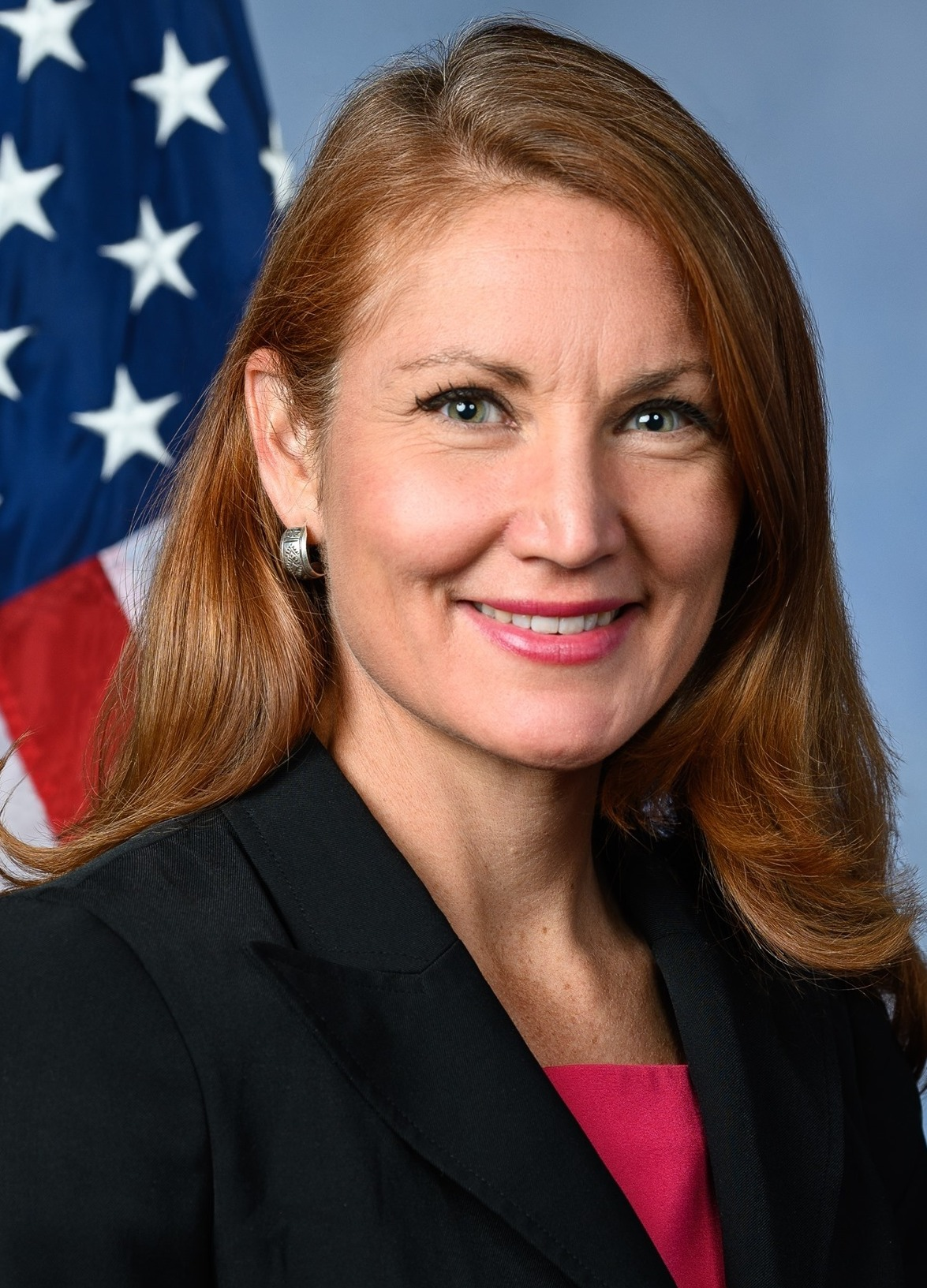

Nominee	Melanie Stansbury	Michelle Garcia Holmes
Party	Democratic	Republican
Popular vote	156,458	124,150
Percentage	55.7%	44.2%
- Stansbury: 50–60% 60–70% 70–80% 80–90% >90% Garcia Holmes: 50–60% 60–70% 70–80% 80–90% >90% Tie: 50%
U.S. Representative before election
Melanie Stansbury
Democratic
Elected U.S. Representative
Melanie Stansbury
Democratic

The 1st district covers the center of the state, taking in the counties of Torrance, Guadalupe, De Baca, and Lincoln, as well as eastern Bernalillo County and most of Albuquerque. Democrat Deb Haaland, who was re-elected with 58.2% of the vote in 2020, resigned on March 16, 2021, after she was confirmed to become the U.S. Secretary of the Interior. Democrat Melanie Stansbury won the June 1, 2021 special election to finish her term with 60.4% of the vote.

=== Democratic primary ===
==== Candidates ====
===== Nominee =====
- Melanie Stansbury, incumbent U.S. representative (2021–present)

==== Endorsements ====
Melanie Stansbury

U.S. senators

- Elizabeth Warren, U.S. senator from Massachusetts (2013–present)

Organizations

- NARAL Pro-Choice America
- Natural Resources Defense Council
- Planned Parenthood Action Fund
- Sierra Club

Labor unions

- American Federation of Teachers New Mexico
- National Education Association

Newspapers

- Albuquerque Journal (post-primary)

==== Results ====
Democratic primary results
Party	Candidate	Votes	%
Democratic	Melanie Stansbury (incumbent)	44,223	100.0
Total votes		44,223	100.0

=== Republican primary ===
==== Candidates ====
===== Nominee =====
- Michelle Garcia Holmes, retired police detective, nominee for this district in 2020, nominee for lieutenant governor in 2018, and candidate for this district in the 2021 special election

===== Eliminated in primary =====
- Louie Sanchez, small business owner

===== Disqualified =====
- Joshua Neal, city planner
- Jacquelyn Reeve, nurse practitioner

==== Results ====
Republican primary results
Party	Candidate	Votes	%
Republican	Michelle Garcia Holmes	25,822	58.7
Republican	Louie Sanchez	18,171	41.3
Total votes		43,993	100.0

=== General election ===
==== Debates and forums ====
2022 New Mexico's 1st congressional district general election debates and forums
No.	Date	Host	Moderator	Link	Participants	
P Participant A Absent N Non-invitee I Invitee W Withdrawn						
P Participant A Absent N Non-invitee I Invitee W Withdrawn					Garcia Holmes	Stansbury
1	October 14, 2022	KOB 4	Tessa Mentus & Matt Grubs		P	P

==== Predictions ====
Source	Ranking	As of
The Cook Political Report	Solid D	April 27, 2022
Inside Elections	Solid D	April 22, 2022
Sabato's Crystal Ball	Likely D	April 27, 2022
Politico	Likely D	April 18, 2022
RCP	Lean D	October 30, 2022
Fox News	Likely D	July 11, 2022
DDHQ	Likely D	July 20, 2022
538	Solid D	June 30, 2022
The Economist	Likely D	September 28, 2022

==== Polling ====
Poll source	Date(s) administered	Sample size (Note: Key: A – all adults RV – registered voters LV – likely voters V – unclear)	Margin of error	Melanie Stansbury (D)	Michelle Garcia Holmes (R)	Other	Undecided
Emerson College	October 25–28, 2022	372 (LV)	± 5.0%	50%	40%	2% (Note: "Someone else" with 2%)	8%
Emerson College	October 25–28, 2022	372 (LV)	± 5.0%	54%	43%	3% (Note: "Someone else" with 3%)	–
Research & Polling Inc.	October 20–27, 2022	410 (LV)	± 4.8%	48%	42%	–	9%

==== Results ====
2022 New Mexico's 1st congressional district election
Party	Candidate	Votes	%
Democratic	Melanie Stansbury (incumbent)	156,462	55.7
Republican	Michelle Garcia Holmes	124,151	44.2
Independent	Victoria Gonzales (write-in)	58	0.0
Total votes		280,671	100.0
Democratic hold			

==== By county ====
County	Melanie Stansbury Democratic		Michelle Garcia Holmes Republican		Victoria Gonzales Independent (write-in)		Margin		Total votes cast
County	#	%	#	%	#	%	#	%	Total votes cast
Bernalillo (part)	117,358	60.71%	75,916	39.27%	42	0.02%	41,442	21.44%	193,316
Chaves (part)	252	14.62%	1,472	85.38%	0	0.00%	-1,220	-70.77%	1,724
De Baca	211	29.18%	512	70.82%	0	0.00%	-301	-41.63%	723
Guadalupe	937	55.87%	740	44.13%	0	0.00%	197	11.75%	1,677
Lincoln	2,486	30.14%	5,762	69.85%	1	0.01%	-3,276	-39.71%	8,249
Otero (part)	104	65.82%	54	34.18%	0	0.00%	50	31.65%	158
Sandoval (part)	27,428	50.74%	26,620	49.24%	13	0.02%	808	1.49%	54,061
Santa Fe (part)	1,537	33.48%	3,054	66.52%	0	0.00%	-1,517	-33.04%	4,591
Torrance	1,795	32.81%	3,675	67.17%	1	0.02%	-1,880	-34.36%	5,471
Valencia (part)	4,354	40.69%	6,346	59.30%	1	0.01%	-1,992	-18.62%	10,701
Totals	156,462	55.75%	124,151	44.23%	58	0.02%	32,311	11.51%	280,671

== District 2 ==
2022 New Mexico's 2nd congressional district election
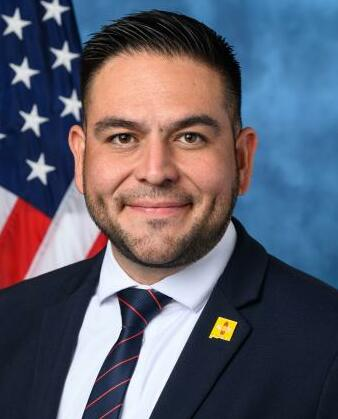

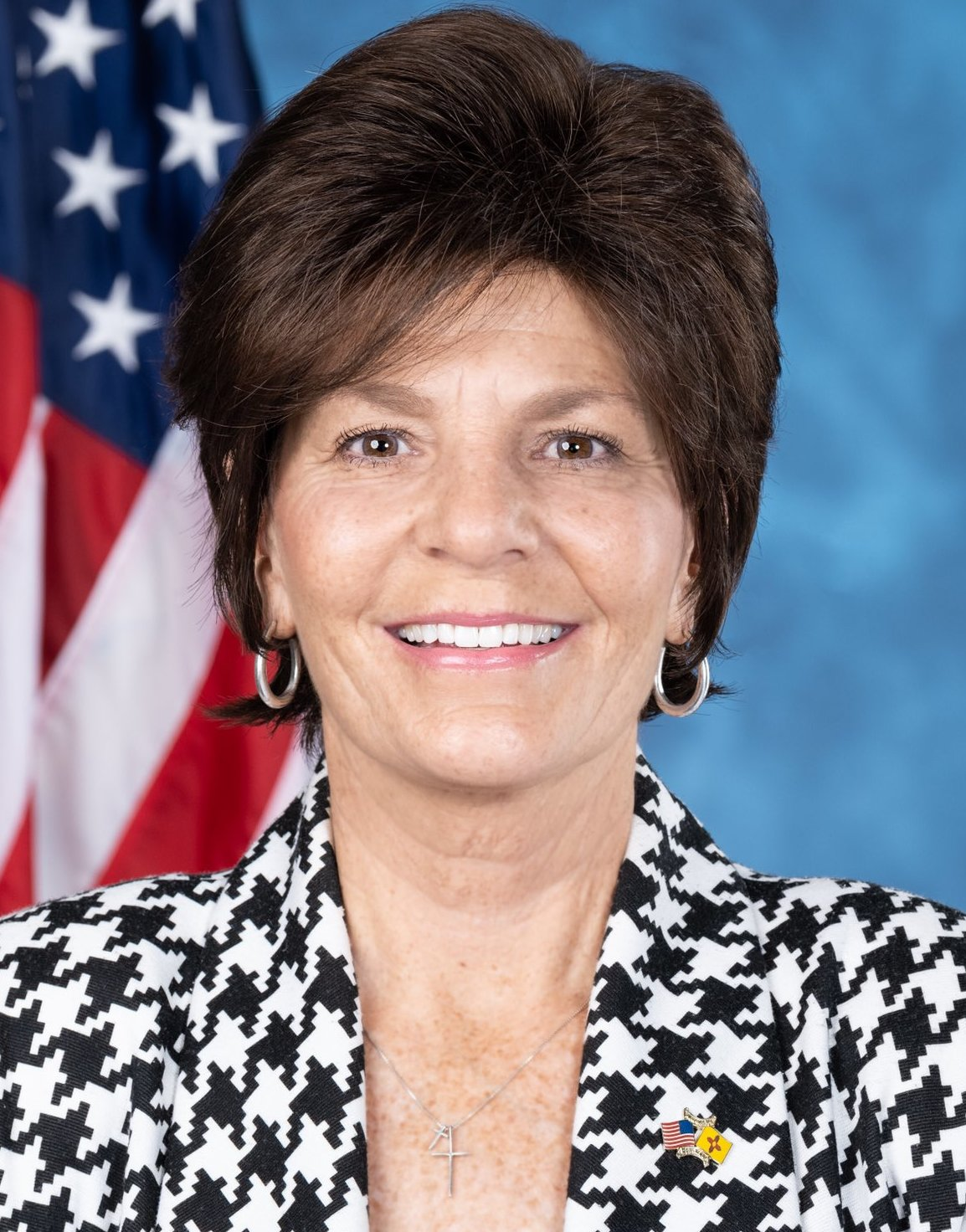
Nominee	Gabe Vasquez	Yvette Herrell
Party	Democratic	Republican
Popular vote	96,986	95,636
Percentage	50.3%	49.6%
- Vasquez: 50–60% 60–70% 70–80% 80–90% Herrell: 50–60% 60–70% 70–80% 80–90% >90% Tie 50%
U.S. Representative before election
Yvette Herrell
Republican
Elected U.S. Representative
Gabe Vasquez
Democratic

The 2nd district encapsulates southern and western New Mexico, including the cities of Las Cruces, Carlsbad, and Alamogordo, as well as the southwestern suburbs of Albuquerque. The incumbent was Republican Yvette Herrell, who had flipped back the district from Xochitl Torres Small (who had in turn narrowly defeated her for the seat in a race to replace a Republican incumbent in 2018) with 53.7% of the vote in 2020. The new 2022-2032 lines for the district made it more competitive for Democrats, with Vasquez defeating Herrell in a narrow race that was too close to call until the next afternoon.

=== Republican primary ===
==== Candidates ====
===== Nominee =====
- Yvette Herrell, incumbent U.S. representative

==== Results ====
Republican primary results
Party	Candidate	Votes	%
Republican	Yvette Herrell (incumbent)	28,623	100.00
Total votes		28,623	100.00

=== Democratic primary ===
==== Candidates ====
===== Nominee =====
- Gabe Vasquez, Las Cruces city councilor (2017–2021) and former aide to U.S. Senator Martin Heinrich

===== Eliminated in primary =====
- Darshan Patel, physician

===== Declined =====
- Joe Cervantes, state senator (2012–present)
- Siah Correa Hemphill, state senator (2020–present) (endorsed Vasquez)
- Howie Morales, lieutenant governor of New Mexico (2019–present) (running for re-election)
- Xochitl Torres Small, Under Secretary of Agriculture for Rural Development (2021–present) and former U.S. representative for New Mexico's 2nd congressional district (2019–2021)

==== Results ====
Democratic primary results
Party	Candidate	Votes	%
Democratic	Gabe Vasquez	24,010	76.1
Democratic	Darshan Patel	7,534	23.9
Total votes		31,544	100.0

=== General election ===
==== Debate ====
2022 New Mexico's 2nd congressional district debate
No.	Date	Host	Moderator	Link	Republican	Democratic
Key: P Participant A Absent N Not invited I Invited W Withdrawn						
Key: P Participant A Absent N Not invited I Invited W Withdrawn					Yvette Herrell	Gabe Vasquez
1	Oct. 21, 2022	KOB (TV)	Matt Grubs; Tessa Mentus		P	P

==== Predictions ====
Source	Ranking	As of
The Cook Political Report	Tossup	April 27, 2022
Inside Elections	Tossup	April 22, 2022
Sabato's Crystal Ball	Lean R	October 26, 2022
Politico	Tossup	April 18, 2022
RCP	Lean R	June 9, 2022
Fox News	Tossup	August 22, 2022
DDHQ	Likely R	November 1, 2022
538	Likely R	November 1, 2022
The Economist	Tossup	September 28, 2022

==== Endorsements ====
Yvette Herrell (R)

U.S. senators

- Ted Cruz, U.S. senator from Texas (2013–present)

State officials

- Ron DeSantis, governor of Florida (2019–present)

Organizations

- Council for Citizens Against Government Waste PAC
- Fraternal Order of Police (New Mexico chapter)
- FreedomWorks
- House Freedom Fund
- Maggie's List
- Republican Jewish Coalition PAC
- Tea Party Express (post-primary)
Gabe Vasquez (D)

U.S. executive branch officials

- Joe Biden, president of the United States (2021–present)

U.S. senators

- Martin Heinrich, U.S. senator from New Mexico (2013–present)

U.S. representatives

- Teresa Leger Fernandez, U.S. representative from NM-03 (2021–present)

Individuals

- George Lopez, actor and comedian

State legislators

- Siah Correa Hemphill, state senator (2020–present)

Organizations

- BOLD PAC
- League of Conservation Voters
- NARAL Pro-Choice America
- Sierra Club

Labor unions

- American Federation of Teachers New Mexico

Newspapers

- Albuquerque Journal

==== Polling ====
Aggregate polls

Source of poll aggregation	Dates administered	Dates updated	Yvette Herrell (R)	Gabe Vasquez (D)	Undecided (Note: Calculated by taking the difference of 100% and all other candidates combined.)	Margin
FiveThirtyEight	July 19 – October 28, 2022	October 31, 2022	49.4%	45.3%	5.3%	Herrell +4.1%

Poll source	Date(s) administered	Sample size	Margin of error	Yvette Herrell (R)	Gabe Vasquez (D)	Other	Undecided
Emerson College	October 25–28, 2022	302 (LV)	± 5.6%	54%	41%	1% (Note: "Someone else" with 1%)	4%
Emerson College	October 25–28, 2022	302 (LV)	± 5.6%	54%	44%	2% (Note: "Someone else" with 2%)	–
Research & Polling Inc.	October 20–27, 2022	410 (LV)	± 4.8%	45%	47%	–	8%
Siena College/New York Times	October 20–24, 2022	398 (LV)	± 5.5%	47%	48%	–	5%
Global Strategy Group (D) (Note: Poll sponsored by Vasquez's campaign)	September 20–26, 2022	500 (LV)	± 4.4%	43%	45%	–	12%
Global Strategy Group (D)	July 19–25, 2022	500 (LV)	± 4.9%	44%	45%	–	11%

Hypothetical polling

Generic Republican vs. generic Democrat

Poll source	Date(s) administered	Sample size	Margin of error	Generic Republican	Generic Democrat	Undecided
GBAO (D) (Note: This poll was sponsored by the House Majority PAC)	October 9, 2022	–	–	46%	49%	5%

==== Results ====
2022 New Mexico's 2nd congressional district election
Party	Candidate	Votes	%
Democratic	Gabe Vasquez	96,986	50.3
Republican	Yvette Herrell (incumbent)	95,636	49.6
Democratic	Eliseo Luna (write-in)	51	0.0
Total votes		192,673	100.0
Democratic gain from Republican			

==== By county ====
County	Yvette Herrell Republican		Gabe Vasquez Democratic		Eliseo Luna Democratic (write-in)		Margin		Total votes cast
County	#	%	#	%	#	%	#	%	Total votes cast
Bernalillo (part)	19,986	40.74%	29,058	59.24%	11	0.02%	9,072	18.49%	49,055
Catron	1,497	75.23%	493	24.77%	0	0.00%	-1,004	-50.45%	1,990
Chaves (part)	76	98.70%	1	1.30%	0	0.00%	-75	-97.40%	77
Cibola	3,200	47.64%	3,514	52.32%	3	0.04%	314	4.67%	6,717
Doña Ana	24,943	43.60%	32,248	56.37%	17	0.03%	7,305	12.77%	57,208
Eddy (part)	8,652	74.11%	3,021	25.88%	1	0.01%	-5,631	-48.24%	11,674
Grant	5,281	45.61%	6,290	54.33%	7	0.06%	1,009	8.71%	11,578
Hidalgo	931	59.07%	645	40.93%	0	0.00%	-286	-18.15%	1,576
Lea (part)	2,251	78.57%	612	21.36%	2	0.07%	-1,639	-57.21%	2,865
Luna	3,236	55.80%	2,563	44.20%	0	0.00%	-673	-11.61%	5,799
McKinley (part)	409	26.78%	1,118	73.22%	0	0.00%	709	46.43%	1,527
Otero (part)	11,312	65.51%	5,950	34.46%	5	0.03%	-5,362	-31.05%	17,267
Sierra	2,970	61.09%	1,891	38.89%	1	0.02%	-1,079	-22.19%	4,862
Socorro	2,905	48.44%	3,092	51.56%	0	0.00%	187	3.12%	5,997
Valencia (part)	7,987	55.16%	6,490	44.82%	4	0.03%	-1,497	-10.34%	14,481
Totals	95,636	49.64%	96,986	50.34%	51	0.03%	1,350	0.70%	192,673

== District 3 ==
2022 New Mexico's 3rd congressional district election
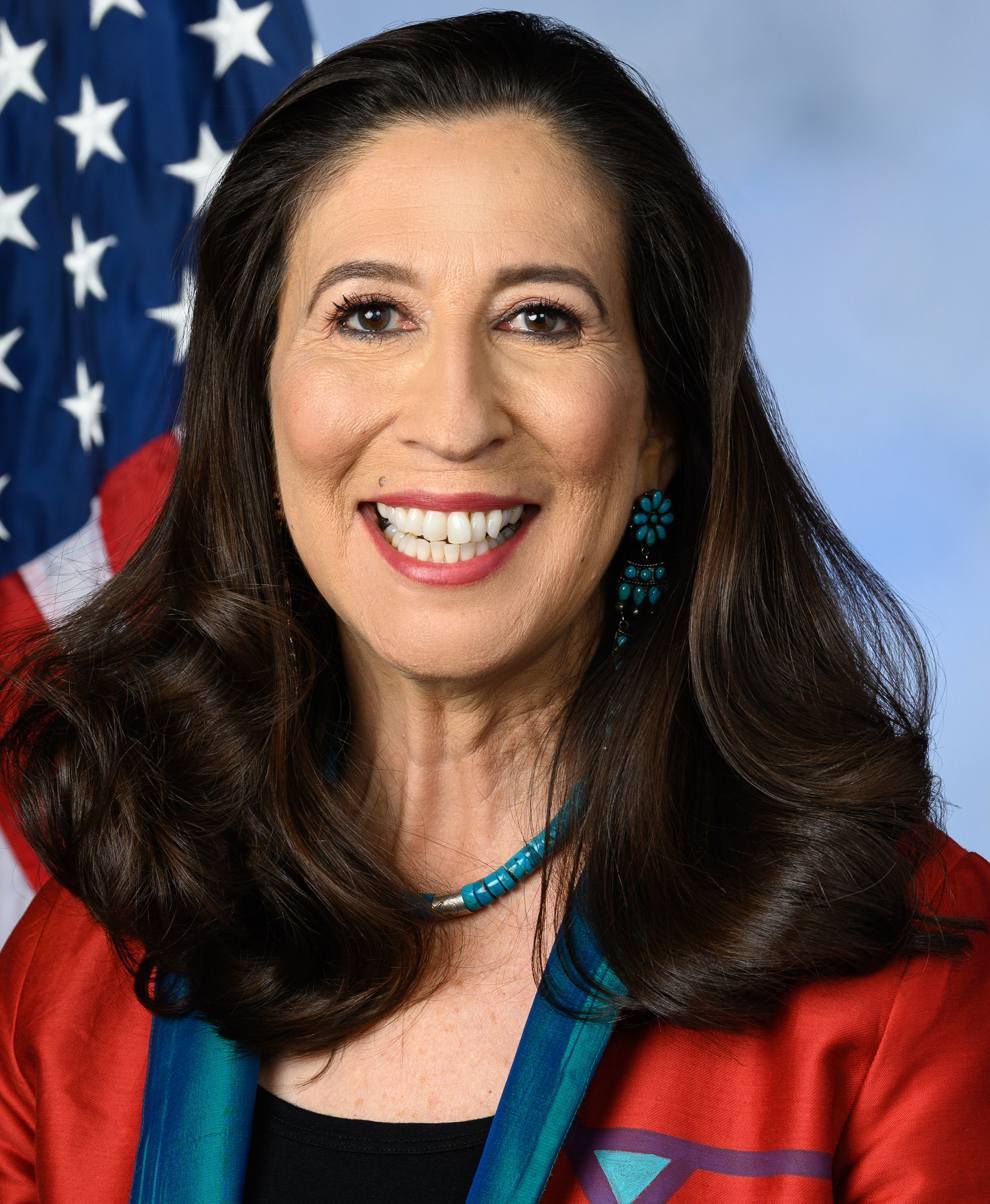

Nominee	Teresa Leger Fernández	Alexis Martinez Johnson
Party	Democratic	Republican
Popular vote	134,220	96,565
Percentage	58.2%	41.8%
- Leger Fernandez: 50–60% 60–70% 70–80% 80–90% >90% Martinez Johnson: 50–60% 60–70% 70–80% 80–90% >90% No votes
U.S. Representative before election
Teresa Leger Fernandez
Democratic
Elected U.S. Representative
Teresa Leger Fernandez
Democratic

The 3rd district covers the northern and eastern parts of the state, taking in the cities of Santa Fe, Roswell, Farmington, and Clovis, as well as parts of the Navajo Nation. The incumbent was Democrat Teresa Leger Fernandez, who was elected with 58.7% of the vote in 2020.

=== Democratic primary ===
==== Candidates ====
===== Nominee =====
- Teresa Leger Fernandez, incumbent U.S. representative (2021–present)

==== Results ====
Democratic primary results
Party	Candidate	Votes	%
Democratic	Teresa Leger Fernandez (incumbent)	46,940	100.0
Total votes		46,940	100.0

=== Republican primary ===
==== Candidates ====
===== Nominee =====
- Alexis Martinez Johnson, environmental engineer, rancher, and nominee for this district in 2020

===== Disqualified =====
- Jerald Steve McFall, farmer

==== Results ====
Republican primary results
Party	Candidate	Votes	%
Republican	Alexis Martinez Johnson	28,729	100.0
Total votes		28,729	100.0

=== General election ===
==== Predictions ====
Source	Ranking	As of
The Cook Political Report	Likely D	April 27, 2022
Inside Elections	Solid D	August 25, 2022
Sabato's Crystal Ball	Likely D	April 27, 2022
Politico	Lean D	April 18, 2022
RCP	Lean D	November 1, 2022
Fox News	Likely D	July 11, 2022
DDHQ	Likely D	July 20, 2022
538	Solid D	September 30, 2022
The Economist	Safe D	November 7, 2022

==== Endorsements ====
Teresa Leger Fernandez (D)

Organizations

- American Israel Public Affairs Committee
- CHC BOLD PAC
- End Citizens United
- Humane Society of the United States Legislative Fund
- Indivisible
- Latino Victory Fund
- League of Conservation Voters
- NARAL Pro-Choice America
- National Women's Political Caucus
- Natural Resources Defense Council
- Planned Parenthood Action Fund
- Sierra Club

Labor unions

- American Federation of Teachers New Mexico
- National Education Association

Newspapers

- Albuquerque Journal
Alexis Martinez Johnson (R)

Organizations

- Maggie's List

==== Polling ====
Poll source	Date(s) administered	Sample size	Margin of error	Teresa Leger Fernandez (D)	Alexis Martinez Johnson (R)	Other	Undecided
Emerson College	October 25–28, 2022	326 (LV)	± 5.4%	53%	40%	1% (Note: "Someone else" with 1%)	7%
Emerson College	October 25–28, 2022	326 (LV)	± 5.4%	58%	40%	1% (Note: "Someone else" with 1%)	–
Research & Polling Inc.	October 20–27, 2022	410 (LV)	± 4.8%	53%	35%	–	10%

==== Results ====
2022 New Mexico's 3rd congressional district election
Party	Candidate	Votes	%
Democratic	Teresa Leger Fernandez (incumbent)	134,217	58.2
Republican	Alexis Martinez Johnson	96,565	41.8
Total votes		230,782	100.0
Democratic hold			

==== By county ====
County	Teresa Leger Fernandez Democratic		Alexis Martinez Johnson Republican		Margin		Total votes cast
County	#	%	#	%	#	%	Total votes cast
Chaves (part)	4,442	30.88%	9,944	69.12%	-5,502	-38.25%	14,386
Colfax	2,406	49.39%	2,465	50.61%	-59	-1.21%	4,871
Curry	2,831	27.89%	7,320	72.11%	-4,489	-44.22%	10,151
Eddy (part)	809	16.65%	4,051	83.35%	-3,242	-66.71%	4,860
Harding	163	40.05%	244	59.95%	-81	-19.90%	407
Lea (part)	1,925	17.49%	9,083	82.51%	-7,158	-65.03%	11,008
Los Alamos	6,472	64.26%	3,600	35.74%	2,872	28.51%	10,072
McKinley (part)	12,095	69.32%	5,352	30.68%	6,743	38.65%	17,447
Mora	1,799	74.62%	612	25.38%	1,187	49.23%	2,411
Quay	939	31.45%	2,047	68.55%	-1,108	-37.11%	2,986
Rio Arriba	9,052	70.94%	3,708	29.06%	5,344	41.88%	12,760
Roosevelt	1,300	28.18%	3,313	71.82%	-2,013	-43.64%	4,613
San Juan	14,412	36.43%	25,150	63.57%	-10,738	-27.14%	39,562
San Miguel	7,318	77.78%	2,091	22.22%	5,227	55.55%	9,409
Sandoval (part)	4,601	70.90%	1,888	29.10%	2,713	41.81%	6,489
Santa Fe (part)	52,531	81.27%	12,110	18.73%	40,421	62.53%	64,641
Taos	10,741	81.08%	2,507	18.92%	8,234	62.15%	13,248
Union	381	26.08%	1,080	73.92%	-699	-47.84%	1,461
Totals	134,217	58.16%	96,565	41.84%	37,652	16.31%	230,782

== Notes ==
Partisan clients
