= 2026 United States House of Representatives elections in New Mexico =

2026 United House of Representatives elections in New Mexico
- November 3, 2026

All 3 New Mexico seats to the United States House of Representatives
	Majority party	Minority party
Party	Democratic	Republican
Last election	3	0
Seats won	3	0
Seat change	Steady	Steady
Popular vote	444,863	277,531
Percentage	61.58%	38.42%
Swing	▲6.51%	▼6.51%

Democratic
50–60%
60–70%
70–80%
80–90%
Republican
50–60%
60–70%
70–80%

The 2026 United States House of Representatives elections in New Mexico were held on November 3, 2026, to elect the three U.S. representatives from the state of New Mexico, one from each of the state's congressional districts. The elections coincided with other elections to the House of Representatives, elections to the United States Senate, and various state and local elections. The primary elections took place on June 2, 2026.

== District 1 ==
2026 New Mexico's 1st congressional district election
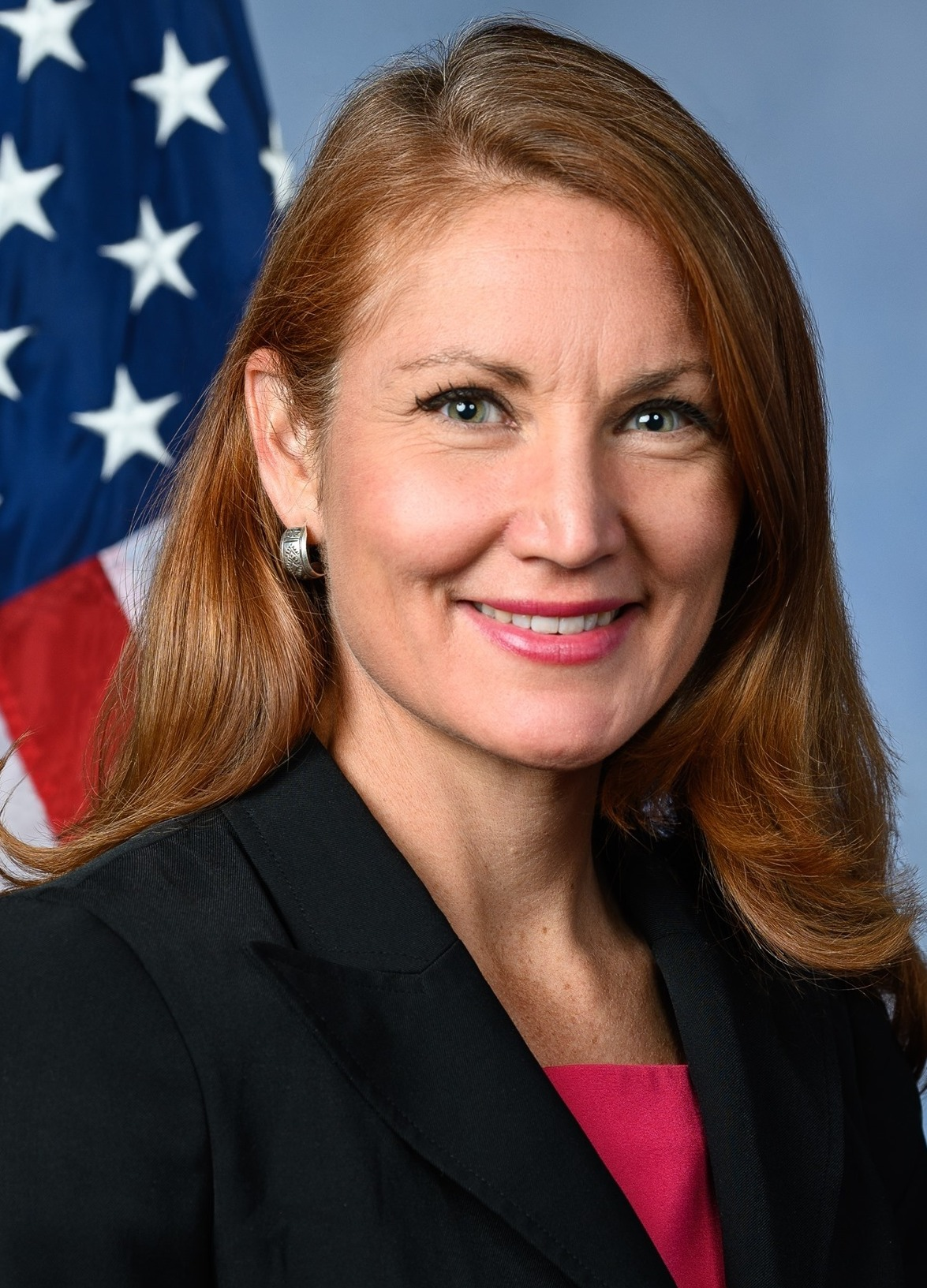

Nominee	Melanie Stansbury	Didi Okpareke
Party	Democratic	Republican
Popular vote	179,794	102,753
Percentage	63.63%	36.37%
- County results Stansbury: 50–60% 60–70% 80–90% Okpareke: 50–60% 60–70% 70–80%
U.S. Representative before election
Melanie Stansbury
Democratic
Elected U.S. Representative
Melanie Stansbury
Democratic

The 1st district covers the center of the state, taking in the counties of Torrance, Guadalupe, De Baca, and Lincoln, as well as eastern Bernalillo County and most of Albuquerque. The incumbent is Democrat Melanie Stansbury, who was re-elected with 56.4% of the vote in 2024.

=== Democratic primary ===
==== Candidates ====
===== Nominee =====
- Melanie Stansbury, incumbent U.S. representative

==== Endorsements ====
Melanie Stansbury

Labor unions

- American Federation of Government Employees

Organizations

- 314 Action
- Christopher Street Project
- J Street
- League of Conservation Voters
- Planned Parenthood Action Fund

==== Fundraising ====
Campaign finance reports as of May 13, 2026
Candidate	Raised	Spent	Cash on hand
Melanie Stansbury (D)	$1,164,453	$990,656	$319,506
Source: Federal Election Commission

==== Results ====
Democratic primary results
Party	Candidate	Votes	%
Democratic	Melanie Stansbury (incumbent)	79,823	100.0
Total votes		79,823	100.0

=== Republican primary ===
==== Candidates ====
===== Nominee =====
- Didi Okpareke, pharmacist

===== Disqualified =====
- Steve Jones, radio host and nominee for this district in 2024
- Carlton Pennington, Army veteran

==== Fundraising ====
Campaign finance reports as of May 13, 2026
Candidate	Raised	Spent	Cash on hand
Didi Okpareke (R)	$75,886	$39,611	$36,274
Source: Federal Election Commission

==== Results ====
Republican primary results
Party	Candidate	Votes	%
Republican	Didi Okpareke	31,809	100.0
Total votes		31,809	100.0

=== General election ===
==== Predictions ====
Source	Ranking	As of
Decision Desk HQ	Safe D	July 14, 2026
The Cook Political Report	Solid D	June 19, 2025
Inside Elections	Solid D	June 19, 2025
Sabato's Crystal Ball	Safe D	June 19, 2025

==== Post-primary endorsements ====
Melanie Stansbury (D)

Labor unions

- National Education Association

==== Fundraising ====
Campaign finance reports as of September 30, 2026
Candidate	Raised	Spent	Cash on hand
Melanie Stansbury (D)	$1,671,811	$1,413,721	$403,798
Didi Okpareke (R)	$100,340	$57,599	$42,741
Source: Federal Election Commission

==== Polling ====
Poll source	Date(s) administered	Sample size (Note: Key: A – all adults RV – registered voters LV – likely voters V – unclear)	Margin of error	Melanie Stansbury (D)	Didi Okapareke (R)	Undecided
Research & Polling (Note: Poll conducted for the Albuquerque Journal)	October 1–9, 2026	380 (LV)	± 5.0%	53%	35%	12%

==== Results ====
2026 New Mexico's 1st congressional district election
Party	Candidate	Votes	%	±%
Democratic	Melanie Stansbury (incumbent)			
Republican	Didi Okapareke			
Total votes				

== District 2 ==
2026 New Mexico's 2nd congressional district election
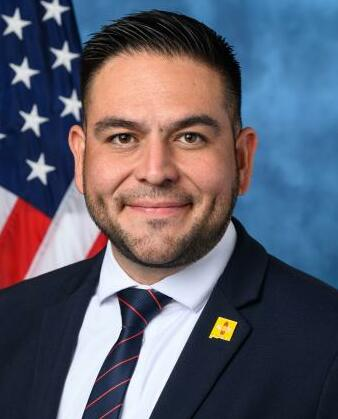

Nominee	Gabe Vasquez	Greg Cunningham
Party	Democratic	Republican
Popular vote	123,737	86,863
Percentage	58.75%	41.25%
- County results Vasquez: 50–60% 60–70% 80–90% Cunningham: 50–60% 60–70% 70–80% 90–100%
U.S. Representative before election
Gabe Vasquez
Democratic
Elected U.S. Representative
Gabe Vasquez
Democratic

The 2nd district encapsulates southern and western New Mexico, including the cities of Las Cruces, Carlsbad, and Alamogordo, as well as the southwestern suburbs of Albuquerque. The incumbent is Democrat Gabe Vasquez, who was re-elected with 52.1% of the vote in 2024.

=== Democratic primary ===
==== Candidates ====
===== Nominee =====
- Gabe Vasquez, incumbent U.S. representative

===== Disqualified =====
- Tom Wakely, Green Party candidate for U.S. Senate in 2024

==== Endorsements ====
Gabe Vasquez

Labor unions

- American Federation of Government Employees

Organizations

- Giffords
- Jewish Democratic Council of America
- Joint Action Committee for Political Affairs
- J Street
- Latino Victory

==== Fundraising ====
Campaign finance reports as of May 13, 2026
Candidate	Raised	Spent	Cash on hand
Gabe Vasquez (D)	$3,157,009	$1,239,654	$1,956,441
Source: Federal Election Commission

==== Results ====
Democratic primary results
Party	Candidate	Votes	%
Democratic	Gabe Vasquez (incumbent)	47,123	100.0
Total votes		47,123	100.0

=== Republican primary ===
==== Candidates ====
===== Nominee =====
- Greg Cunningham, retired police officer and nominee for New Mexico's 29th House district in 2022 and 2024

===== Withdrawn =====
- Jose Orozco, federal contractor and nominee for New Mexico's 13th House district in 2012 (endorsed Cunningham; will appear on ballot)

===== Declined =====
- Yvette Herrell, former U.S. representative (2021–2023) (endorsed Cunningham)

==== Endorsements ====
Greg Cunningham

Executive branch officials

- Donald Trump, president of the United States (2017–2021, 2025–present)

U.S. representatives

- Tom Emmer, House majority whip (2023–present) from MN-06 (2015–present)
- Yvette Herrell, former NM-02 (2021–2023)
- Richard Hudson, NC-09 (2013–present)
- Mike Johnson, speaker of the House (2023–present) from LA-04 (2017–present)
- Lisa McClain, MI-09 (2021–present)
- Steve Scalise, House majority leader (2023–present) from LA-01 (2008–present)

Individuals

- Jose Orozco, federal contractor and former candidate for this seat

Organizations

- NRCC MAGA Majority

==== Fundraising ====
Italics indicate withdrawn candidate.

Campaign finance reports as of May 13, 2026
Candidate	Raised	Spent	Cash on hand
Greg Cunningham (R)	$659,523	$310,324	$349,199
Jose Orozco (R)	$218,755	$215,937	$2,818
Source: Federal Election Commission

==== Results ====
Republican primary results
Party	Candidate	Votes	%
Republican	Greg Cunningham	26,836	84.5
Republican	Jose Orozco (withdrawn)	4,910	15.5
Total votes		31,746	100.0

=== General election ===
==== Predictions ====
Source	Ranking	As of
Decision Desk HQ	Likely D	August 12, 2026
The Cook Political Report	Lean D	January 15, 2026
Inside Elections	Tilt D	June 19, 2025
Sabato's Crystal Ball	Lean D	June 19, 2025

==== Post-primary endorsements ====
Gabe Vasquez (D)

Labor unions

- National Education Association

==== Fundraising ====
Campaign finance reports as of October 14, 2026
Candidate	Raised	Spent	Cash on hand
Gabe Vasquez (D)	$5,518,618	$5,060,722	$496,982
Gregg Cunningham (R)	$2,527,072	$2,183,325	$343,747
Source: Federal Election Commission

==== Polling ====
Poll source	Date(s) administered	Sample size	Margin of error	Gabe Vasquez (D)	Greg Cunningham (R)	Undecided
Research & Polling (Note: Poll conducted for the Albuquerque Journal)	October 1–9, 2026	383 (LV)	± 5.0%	48%	44%	8%
SurveyUSA	August 28 – September 2, 2026	554 (LV)	± 4.6%	46%	43%	11%
co/efficient (R) (Note: Poll commissioned by the National Republican Congressional Committee)	April 26–28, 2026	879 (LV)	± 3.3%	43%	41%	16%

Hypothetical polling

Generic Democrat vs. generic Republican

Poll source	Date(s) administered	Sample size	Margin of error	Generic Democrat	Generic Republican	Undecided
co/efficient (R)	April 26–28, 2026	879 (LV)	± 3.3%	45%	45%	10%

==== Results ====
2026 New Mexico's 2nd congressional district election
Party	Candidate	Votes	%	±%
Democratic	Gabe Vasquez (incumbent)			
Republican	Greg Cunningham			
Total votes				

== District 3 ==
2026 New Mexico's 3rd congressional district election
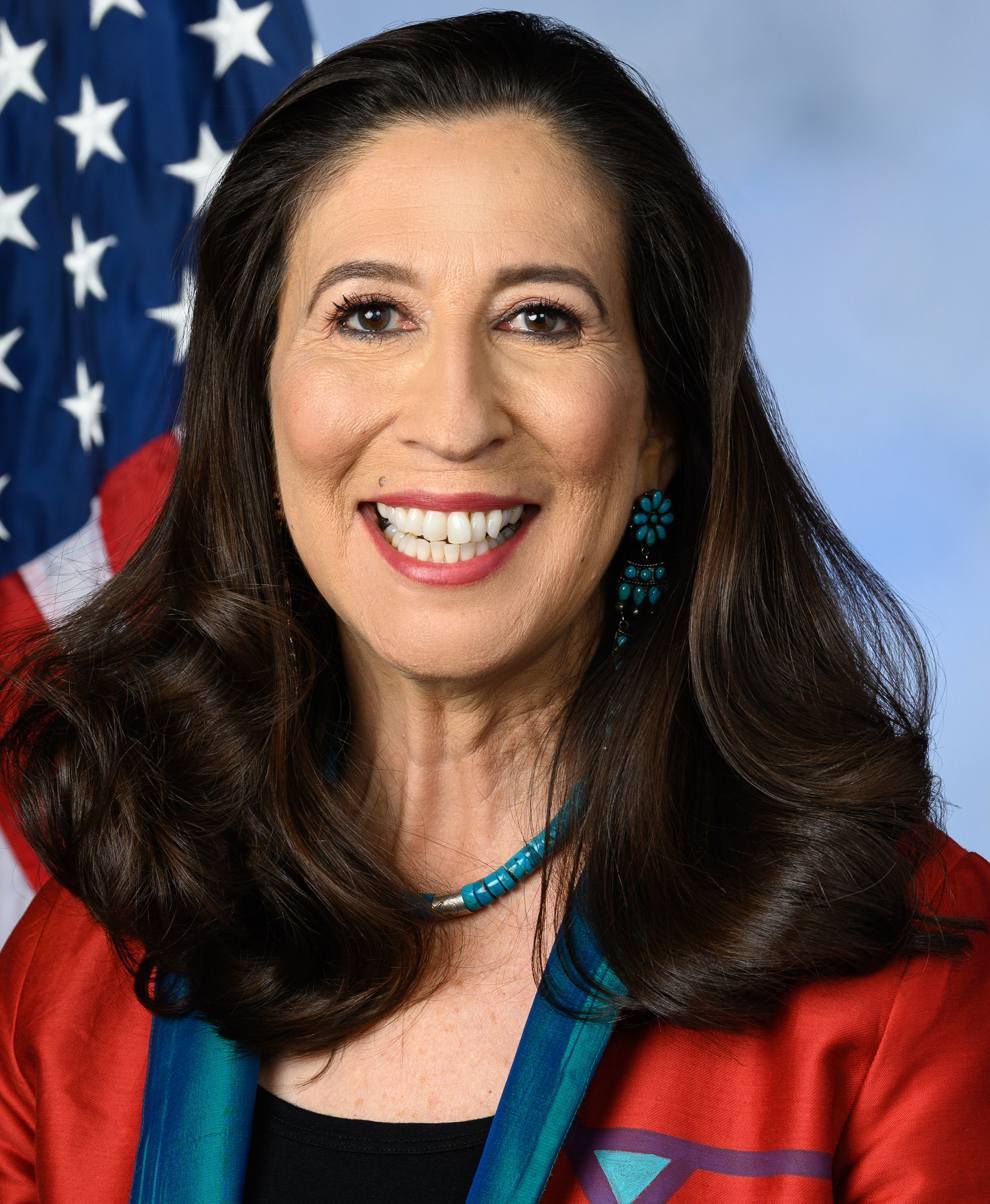

Nominee	Teresa Leger Fernández	Martin Zamora
Party	Democratic	Republican
Popular vote	141,332	87,915
Percentage	61.65%	38.35%
- County results Leger Fernandez: 60–70% 70–80% 80–90% Zamora: 50–60% 60–70% 70–80%
U.S. Representative before election
Teresa Leger Fernández
Democratic
Elected U.S. Representative
Teresa Leger Fernández
Democratic

The 3rd district covers the northern and eastern parts of the state, taking in the cities of Santa Fe, Roswell, Farmington, and Clovis, as well as parts of the Navajo Nation. The incumbent is Democrat Teresa Leger Fernández, who was re-elected with 56.3% of the vote in 2024.

=== Democratic primary ===
==== Candidates ====
===== Nominee =====
- Teresa Leger Fernández, incumbent U.S. representative

==== Endorsements ====
Teresa Leger Fernández

Labor unions

- American Federation of Government Employees

Organizations

- Council for a Livable World
- J Street
- Jewish Democratic Council of America
- Planned Parenthood Action Fund
- Reproductive Freedom for All

==== Fundraising ====
Campaign finance reports as of May 13, 2026
Candidate	Raised	Spent	Cash on hand
Teresa Leger Fernández (D)	$1,118,127	$880,957	$645,096
Source: Federal Election Commission

==== Results ====
Democratic primary results
Party	Candidate	Votes	%
Democratic	Teresa Leger Fernández (incumbent)	68,768	100.0
Total votes		68,768	100.0

=== Republican primary ===
==== Candidates ====
===== Nominee =====
- Martin Zamora, state representative from the 63rd district (2019–present)

==== Fundraising ====
Campaign finance reports as of May 13, 2026
Candidate	Raised	Spent	Cash on hand
Martin Zamora (R)	$433,495	$164,601	$268,894
Source: Federal Election Commission

==== Results ====
Republican primary results
Party	Candidate	Votes	%
Republican	Martin Zamora	32,901	100.0
Total votes		32,901	100.0

=== General election ===
==== Predictions ====
Source	Ranking	As of
Decision Desk HQ	Safe D	October 1, 2026
The Cook Political Report	Solid D	June 19, 2025
Inside Elections	Solid D	June 19, 2025
Sabato's Crystal Ball	Safe D	June 19, 2025

==== Post-primary endorsements ====
Teresa Leger Fernández (D)

Labor unions

- National Education Association

Organizations

- National Women's Political Caucus

==== Fundraising ====
Campaign finance reports as of September 30, 2026
Candidate	Raised	Spent	Cash on hand
Teresa Leger Fernández (D)	$1,554,253	$1,314,976	$647,202
Martin Zamora (R)	$598,684	$450,748	$147,936
Source: Federal Election Commission

==== Polling ====
Poll source	Date(s) administered	Sample size	Margin of error	Teresa Leger Fernández (D)	Martin Zamora (R)	Undecided
Research & Polling (Note: Poll conducted for the Albuquerque Journal)	October 1–9, 2026	362 (LV)	± 5.2%	53%	39%	8%

==== Results ====
2026 New Mexico's 3rd congressional district election
Party	Candidate	Votes	%	±%
Democratic	Teresa Leger Fernández (incumbent)			
Republican	Martin Zamora			
Total votes				

== See also ==
- 2026 New Mexico elections
- 2026 United States House of Representatives elections
- 2026 New Mexico House of Representatives election

== Notes ==
Partisan clients
