= Martin R. Zamora =

American politician

Martin Zamora

Member of the New Mexico House of Representatives from the 63rd district
- Incumbent
- Assumed office January 15, 2019
- Preceded by: George Dodge
- Succeeded by: Seth Martin (elect)

Personal details
- Born: Martin Ruben Zamora Clovis, New Mexico, U.S.
- Party: Republican

Martin Ruben Zamora is an American politician and farmer, currently serving as a member of the New Mexico House of Representatives. A Republican, Zamora represents the 63rd district, which includes Santa Rosa, New Mexico.

== Biography ==
Zamora was born and raised in Clovis, New Mexico.

Prior to his election to the New Mexico House of Representatives, Zamora owned and operated several agriculture businesses. He currently owns a farm in Clovis and a ranch in Torrance County. Zamora took office on January 15, 2019, succeeding incumbent Democrat George Dodge. Zamora was re-elected with 59% of the vote.

After Joe Biden defeated Donald Trump in the 2020 presidential election, Zamora cast doubt on the integrity of the election results. Zamora has declined to state whether he believes Biden won the election.

Zamora ran to unseat Democrat Teresa Leger Fernández in the 2026 election in New Mexico's 3rd congressional district. If he had been elected, he would be the first Republican to represent the district since the late 1990s. He lost by a wide margin. Leger Fernandez got 141,332 votes (61.7%) while only Zamona got 87,915 votes (38.3%).
