= 2020 United States House of Representatives elections in New Mexico =

- November 3, 2020

All 3 New Mexico seats to the United States House of Representatives
	Majority party	Minority party
Party	Democratic	Republican
Last election	3	0
Seats won	2	1
Seat change	▼1	▲1
Popular vote	495,781	407,786
Percentage	54.86%	45.12%
Swing	▼3.39%	▲6.92%

Democratic
50–60%
60–70%
70–80%
Republican
50–60%
60–70%
70–80%

The 2020 United States House of Representatives elections in New Mexico was held on November 3, 2020, to elect the three U.S. representatives from the state of New Mexico, one from each of the state's three congressional districts. The elections coincided with the 2020 U.S. presidential election, as well as other elections to the House of Representatives, elections to the United States Senate and various state and local elections.

From the election until Deb Haaland's resignation to become Secretary of the Interior, New Mexico had a house delegation composed entirely of women of color, the second US state (after Hawaii) to do so. New Mexico is also the first state to have a majority of its house representatives be Native Americans. (Note: Two of the three representatives elected from New Mexico are of Native American ancestry: Yvette Herrell is Cherokee and Deb Haaland is a member of the Laguna Pueblo.)

== Overview ==
Popular vote
Democratic	54.86%
Republican	45.12%
Other	0.01%

House seats
Democratic	66.67%
Republican	33.33%

Results of the 2020 United States House of Representatives elections in New Mexico by district:

District	Democratic		Republican		Others		Total		Result
District	Votes	%	Votes	%	Votes	%	Votes	%	Result
District 1	186,953	58.19%	134,337	41.81%	0	0.00%	321,290	100.0%	Democratic hold
District 2	122,546	45.40%	142,283	52.71%	117	0.04%	264,946	100.0%	Republican gain
District 3	186,282	58.68%	131,166	41.32%	0	0.00%	317,448	100.0%	Democratic hold
Total	495,781	54.86%	407,786	45.12%	117	0.01%	903,684	100.0%	

== District 1 ==
2020 New Mexico's 1st congressional district election
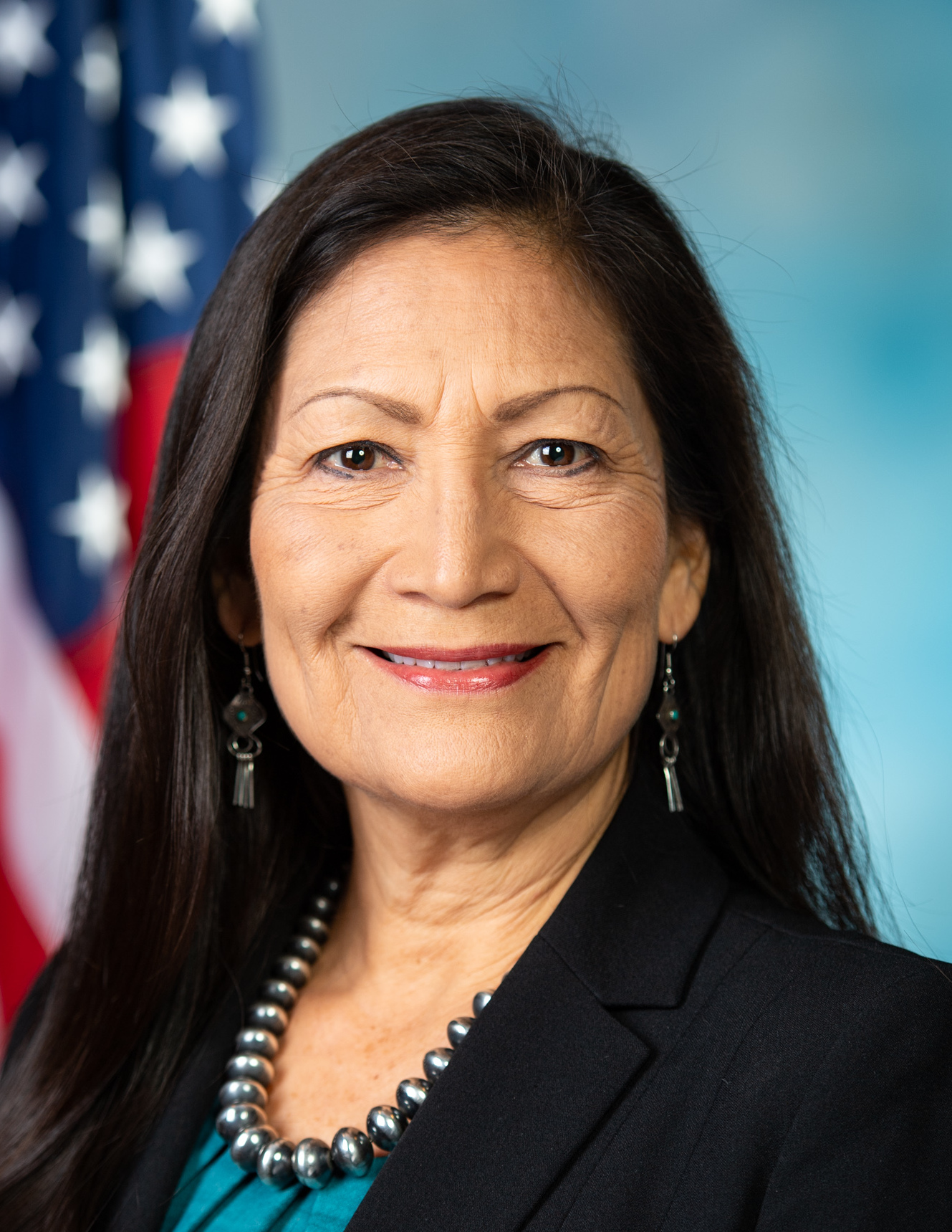

Nominee	Deb Haaland	Michelle Garcia Holmes
Party	Democratic	Republican
Popular vote	186,953	134,337
Percentage	58.2%	41.8%
- Haaland: 50–60% 60–70% 70–80% 80–90% >90% Holmes: 50–60% 60–70% 70–80% 80–90% Tie: 50% No votes
U.S. Representative before election
Deb Haaland
Democratic
Elected U.S. Representative
Deb Haaland
Democratic

The 1st district is centered around Albuquerque, taking in most of Bernalillo County, Torrance County, and parts of Sandoval County, Santa Fe County and Valencia County. The incumbent was Democrat Deb Haaland, who was elected with 59.1% of the vote in 2018.

=== Democratic primary ===
==== Candidates ====
===== Nominee =====
- Deb Haaland, incumbent U.S. representative

==== Results ====
Democratic primary results
Party	Candidate	Votes	%
Democratic	Deb Haaland (incumbent)	83,032	100.0
Total votes		83,032	100.0

=== Republican primary ===
==== Candidates ====
===== Nominee =====
- Michelle Garcia Holmes, retired police detective and nominee for lieutenant governor of New Mexico in 2018

===== Eliminated in primary =====
- Brett Kokinadis, founder of New Mexico Democrats for Democracy
- Jared Vanderdussen, attorney

==== Results ====
Republican primary results
Party	Candidate	Votes	%
Republican	Michelle Garcia Holmes	23,783	48.1
Republican	Jared Vanderdussen	19,847	40.2
Republican	Brett Kokinadis	5,798	11.7
Total votes		49,428	100.0

=== General election ===
==== Debate ====
2020 New Mexico's 1st congressional district debate
No.	Date	Host	Moderator	Link	Democratic	Republican
Key: P Participant A Absent N Not invited I Invited W Withdrawn						
Key: P Participant A Absent N Not invited I Invited W Withdrawn					Deb Haaland	Michelle Garica Holmes
1	Oct. 11, 2020	KOAT-TV; The Albuquerque Journal	Doug Fernandez; Shelby Cashman; Kent Walz		P	P

==== Predictions ====
Source	Ranking	As of
The Cook Political Report	Safe D	July 2, 2020
Inside Elections	Safe D	June 2, 2020
Sabato's Crystal Ball	Safe D	July 2, 2020
Politico	Safe D	April 19, 2020
Daily Kos	Safe D	June 3, 2020
RCP	Safe D	June 9, 2020
Niskanen	Safe D	June 7, 2020

==== Endorsements ====
Deb Haaland (D)

Organizations

- AFSCME
- Center for Biological Diversity
- Indivisible
- League of Conservation Voters Action Fund
- Sierra Club

==== Polling ====
Poll source	Date(s) administered	Sample size (Note: Key: A – all adults RV – registered voters LV – likely voters V – unclear)	Margin of error	Deb Haaland (D)	Michelle Garcia Holmes (R)	Undecided
Research & Polling Inc.	October 23–29, 2020	430 (LV)	± 4.7%	58%	37%	6%
Research & Polling Inc.	August 26 – September 2, 2020	404 (LV)	± 4.9%	58%	31%	11%

==== Results ====
New Mexico's 1st congressional district, 2020
Party	Candidate	Votes	%
Democratic	Deb Haaland (incumbent)	186,953	58.2
Republican	Michelle Garcia Holmes	134,337	41.8
Total votes		321,290	100.0
Democratic hold			

== District 2 ==
2020 New Mexico's 2nd congressional district election
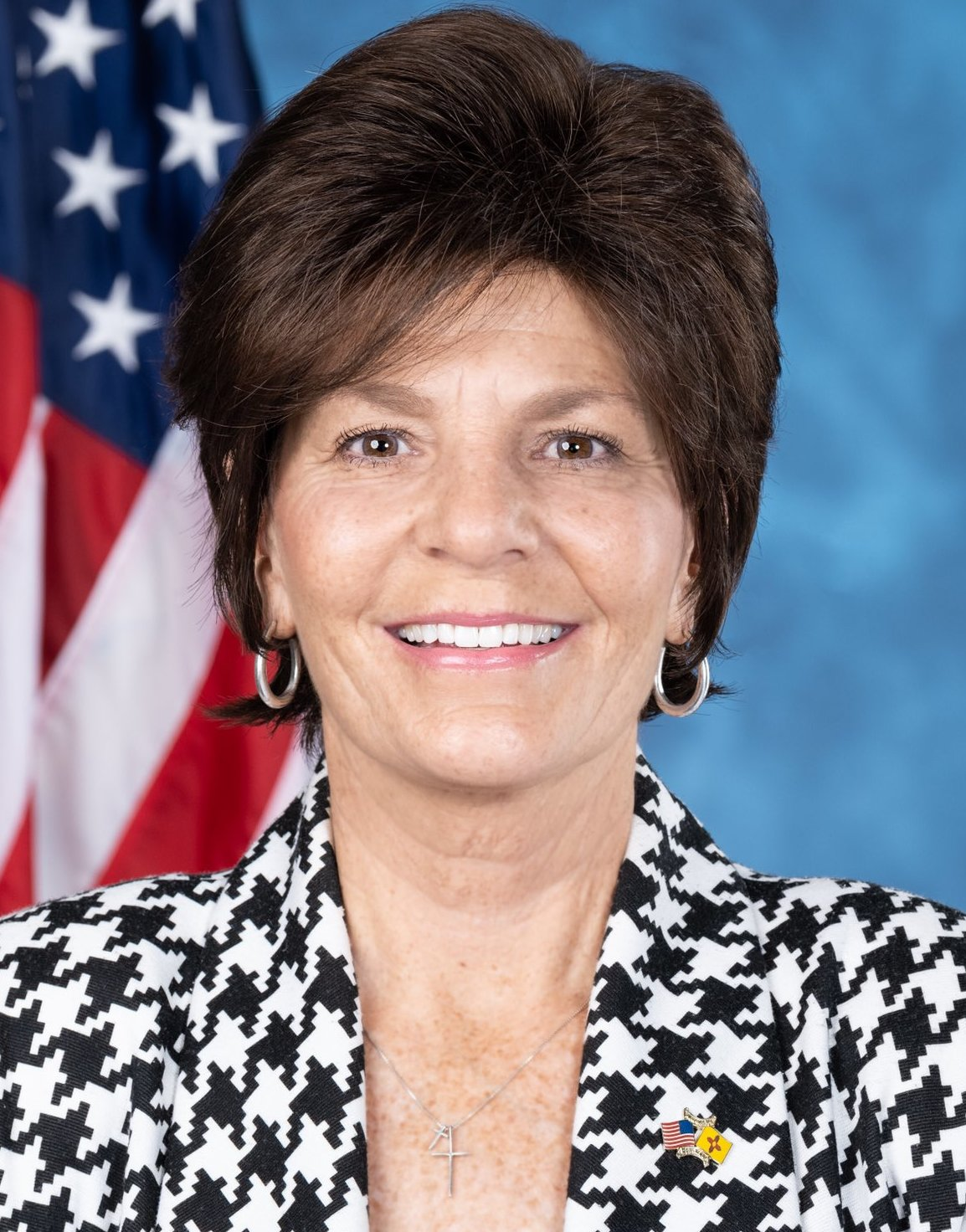

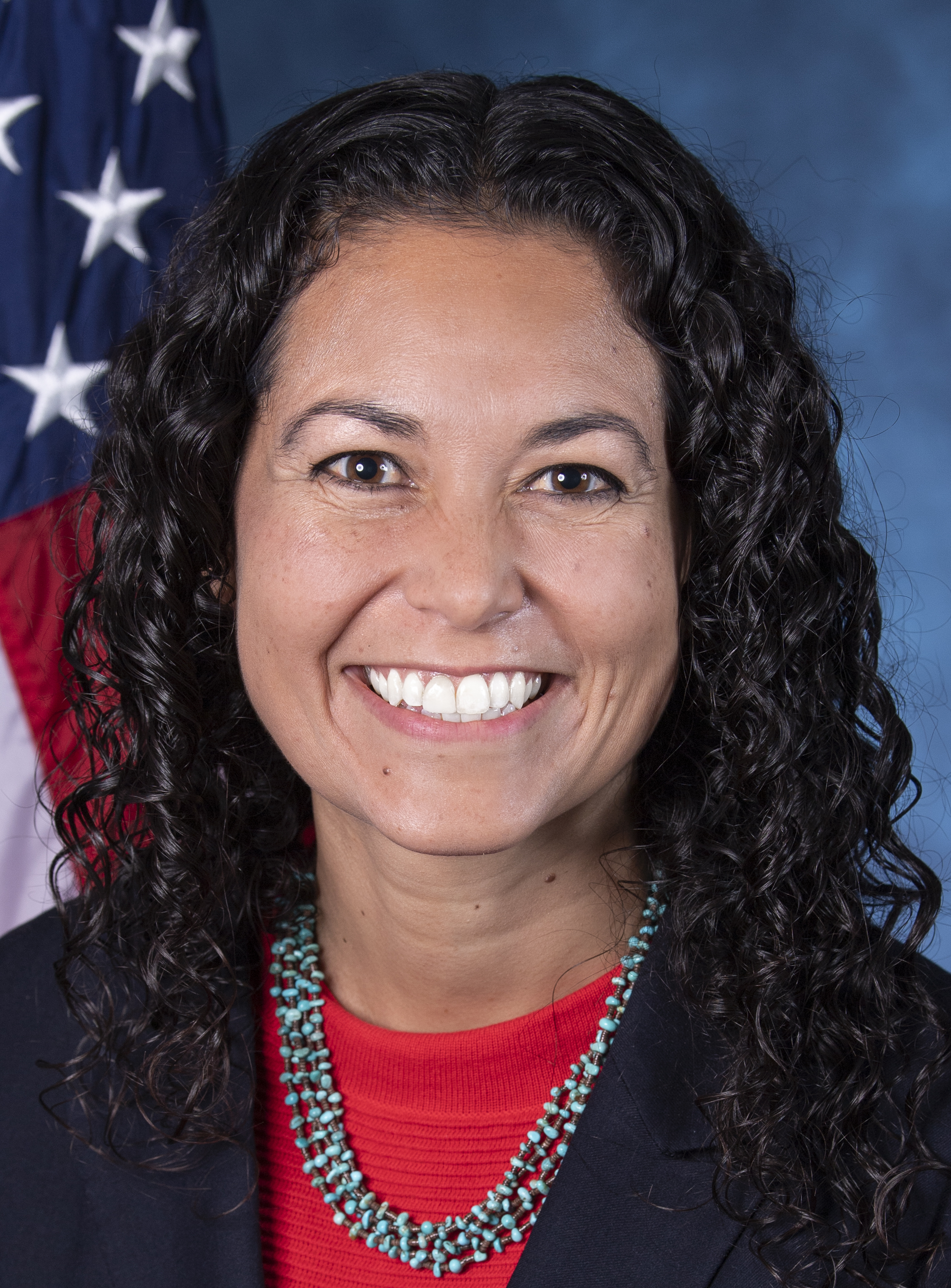
Candidate	Yvette Herrell	Xochitl Torres Small
Party	Republican	Democratic
Popular vote	142,283	122,546
Percentage	53.7%	46.3%
- Herrell: 50–60% 60–70% 70–80% 80–90% >90% Torres Small: 50–60% 60–70% 70–80% 80–90% >90% Tie: 50% No votes
U.S. Representative before election
Xochitl Torres Small
Democratic
Elected U.S. Representative
Yvette Herrell
Republican

The 2nd district covers southern New Mexico, including Las Cruces, Roswell, and the southern part of Albuquerque. The incumbent was Democrat Xochitl Torres Small, who flipped the district and was elected with 50.9% of the vote in 2018.

=== Democratic primary ===
==== Candidates ====
===== Nominee =====
- Xochitl Torres Small, incumbent U.S. representative

==== Results ====
Democratic primary results
Party	Candidate	Votes	%
Democratic	Xochitl Torres Small (incumbent)	48,095	100.0
Total votes		48,095	100.0

=== Republican primary ===
==== Candidates ====
===== Nominee =====
- Yvette Herrell, former state representative and nominee for New Mexico's 2nd congressional district in 2018

===== Eliminated in primary =====
- Claire Chase, oil company executive
- Chris Mathys, businessman, candidate for New Mexico Public Regulation Commission in 2018, and former Fresno city councilman

===== Declined =====
- Leland Gould, lobbyist
- Monty Newman, businessman, former chair of the New Mexico Republican Party, former mayor of Hobbs, and candidate for New Mexico's 2nd congressional district in 2018
- Steve Pearce, chair of the New Mexico Republican Party, former U.S. representative, and nominee for governor of New Mexico in 2018

==== Polling ====
Poll source	Date(s) administered	Sample size	Margin of error	Claire Chase	Gavin Clarkson	Yvette Herrell	Chris Mathys	Undecided
The Tarrance Group (R) (Note: Poll sponsored by the Yvette Herrell campaign)	December 2–3, 2019	450 (LV)	± 4.7%	13%	–	43%	12%	–
The Strategy Group Company (R)	January 23–27, 2019	537 (LV)	–	4%	7%	50%	2%	37%

==== Debate ====
2020 New Mexico's 2nd congressional district Republican primary debate
No.	Date	Host	Moderator	Link	Republican	Republican	Republican
Key: P Participant A Absent N Not invited I Invited W Withdrawn							
Key: P Participant A Absent N Not invited I Invited W Withdrawn					Claire Chase	Yvette Herrell	Chris Mathys
1		Lea County Federated Republican Women	Lindsay Chism McCarter	YouTube	I	P	P

==== Results ====
Republican primary results
Party	Candidate	Votes	%
Republican	Yvette Herrell	26,968	44.7
Republican	Claire Chase	19,017	31.5
Republican	Chris Mathys	14,378	23.8
Total votes		60,363	100.0

=== General election ===
==== Debates ====
2020 New Mexico's 2nd congressional district debates
No.	Date	Host	Moderator	Link	Democratic	Republican
Key: P Participant A Absent N Not invited I Invited W Withdrawn						
Key: P Participant A Absent N Not invited I Invited W Withdrawn					Xochitl Torres Small	Yvette Herrell
2	Sep. 27, 2020	KOAT-TV; The Albuquerque Journal	Doug Fernandez; Shelly Ribando; Kent Walz		P	P
2	Oct. 9, 2020	KOB (TV)	Tessa Mentus; Chris Ramirez		P	P
3	Oct. 11, 2020	KNME-TV	Gene Grant		P	P

==== Predictions ====
Source	Ranking	As of
The Cook Political Report	Tossup	July 2, 2020
Inside Elections	Tossup	October 16, 2020
Sabato's Crystal Ball	Lean D	November 2, 2020
Politico	Tossup	April 19, 2020
Daily Kos	Tossup	June 3, 2020
RCP	Tossup	June 9, 2020
Niskanen	Lean D	June 7, 2020

==== Endorsements ====
Xochitl Torres Small (D)

Federal officials

- Amy Klobuchar, U.S. senator (D-MN); former 2020 presidential candidate

Newspapers

- Albuquerque Journal

Organizations

- EMILY's List
- End Citizens United
- League of Conservation Voters Action Fund
- NARAL Pro-Choice America
- Sierra Club
Yvette Herrell (R)

Executive officials

- Donald Trump, 45th president of the United States

Federal officials

- Ted Cruz, U.S. senator (R-TX)
- Jim Jordan, U.S. representative (R-OH)
- Mark Meadows, White House Chief of Staff and former U.S. representative (R-NC) (2013–2020)

Organizations

- Citizens United Political Victory Fund
- FreedomWorks for America
- Gun Owners of America
- NRA Political Victory Fund
- Susan B. Anthony List

Individuals

- Jim DeMint, former president of The Heritage Foundation (2013–2017), U.S. senator (R-SC) (2005–2013), and U.S. representative (R-SC) (1999–2005)
- Mike Huckabee, 2008 and 2016 presidential candidate, former governor of Arkansas (1996–2007)
- Mark Levin, conservative talk radio host
- Harry Teague, former congressman (D-NM)
Claire Chase (R)

Organizations

- Republican Main Street Partnership PAC
- Winning for Women

==== Polling ====
View source data.

Poll source	Date(s) administered	Sample size	Margin of error	Xochitl Torres Small (D)	Yvette Herrell (R)	Undecided
Research & Polling Inc.	October 23–29, 2020	403 (LV)	± 4.9%	46%	48%	5%
Strategies 360 (D) (Note: Poll sponsored by Small's campaign)	October 16–20, 2020	406 (LV)	± 4.9%	47%	46%	–
The Tarrance Group (R) (Note: Poll sponsored by the NRCC.)	September 26–29, 2020	400 (LV)	± 4.9%	47%	48%	5%
Research & Polling Inc.	August 26 – September 2, 2020	418 (LV)	± 4.8%	47%	45%	9%
The Tarrance Group (R)	July 7–9, 2020	400 (LV)	± 4.9%	46%	46%	8%
Public Opinion Strategies (R) (Note: Poll sponsored by the Congressional Leadership Fund, which supports Republican candidates for Congress.)	December 18–19, 2019	400 (LV)	± 4.9%	46%	48%	–
The Strategy Group Company (R)	January 23–27, 2019	1,070 (LV)	–	38%	51%	11%

Hypothetical polling

Poll source	Date(s) administered	Sample size	Margin of error	Generic Democrat	Generic Republican
Strategies 360/Xochitl Torres Small	October 16–20, 2020	406 (LV)	± 4.9%	45%	50%
The Tarrance Group (R)	September 26–29, 2020	400 (LV)	± 4.9%	45%	49%

==== Results ====
New Mexico's 2nd congressional district, 2020
Party	Candidate	Votes	%
Republican	Yvette Herrell	142,283	53.7
Democratic	Xochitl Torres Small (incumbent)	122,546	46.3
Independent	Steve Jones (write-in)	117	0.0
Total votes		264,946	100.0
Republican gain from Democratic			

== District 3 ==
2020 New Mexico's 3rd congressional district election
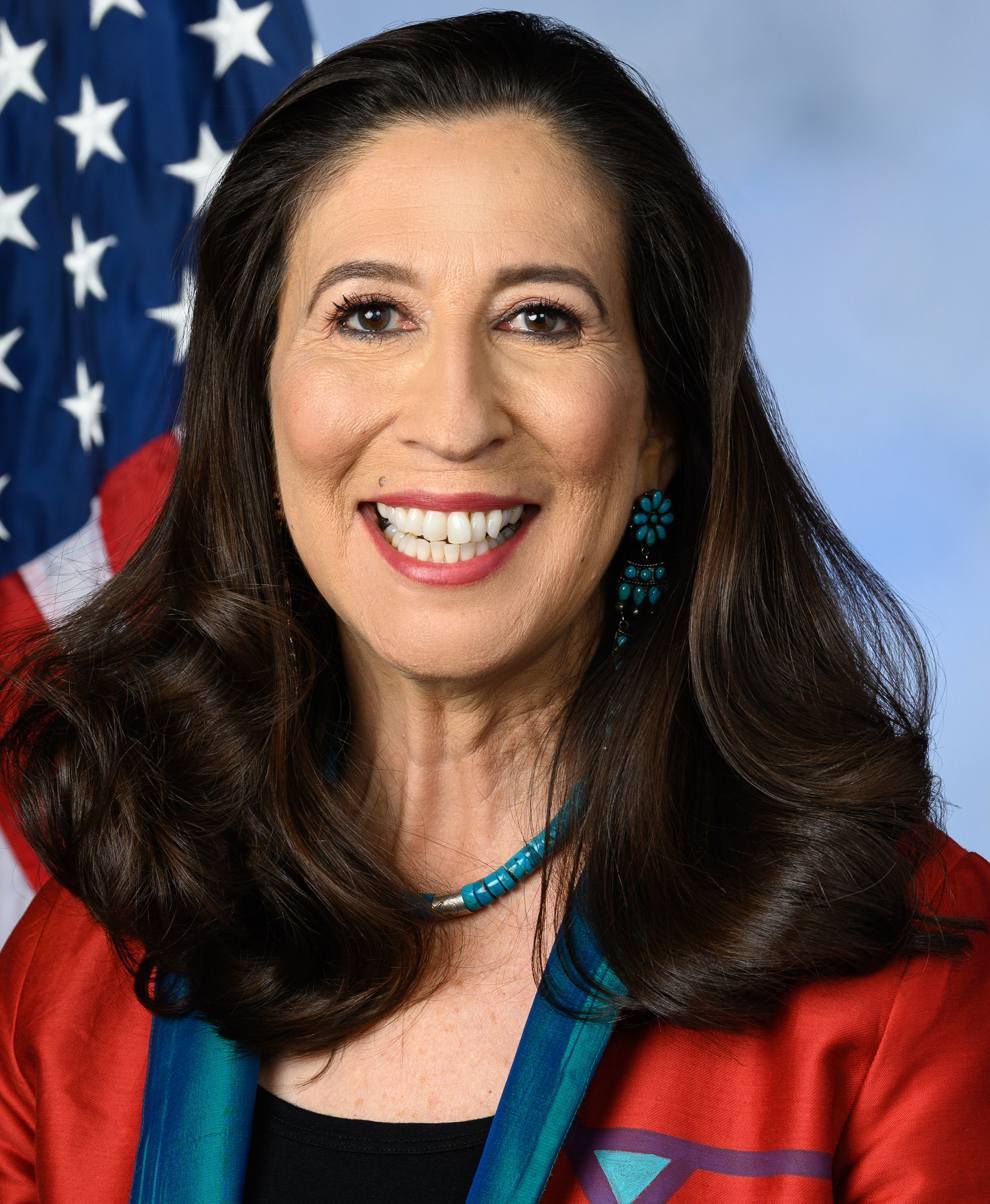

Nominee	Teresa Leger Fernández	Alexis Martinez Johnson
Party	Democratic	Republican
Popular vote	186,282	131,166
Percentage	58.7%	41.3%
- Leger Fernandez: 50–60% 60–70% 70–80% 80–90% >90% Martinez Johnson: 50–60% 60–70% 70–80% 80–90% >90% Tie: 50% No votes
U.S. Representative before election
Ben Ray Luján
Democratic
Elected U.S. Representative
Teresa Leger Fernandez
Democratic

The 3rd district encompasses all of northern New Mexico, including the city of Santa Fe, and includes most of the Navajo Nation and Puebloans within New Mexico. The incumbent was Democrat Ben Ray Luján, who was re-elected with 63.4% of the vote in 2018, and announced on April 1, 2019, that he would seek the Democratic nomination for U.S. Senate in 2020. Luján won the primary, and ultimately the general election.

=== Democratic primary ===
==== Candidates ====
===== Nominee =====
- Teresa Leger Fernandez, attorney and daughter of former state senator Ray Leger

===== Eliminated in primary =====
- John Blair, former New Mexico Deputy Secretary of State and former political aide to U.S. Senator Martin Heinrich
- Laura Montoya, Sandoval County treasurer
- Valerie Plame, former CIA operations officer
- Joseph L. Sanchez, state representative
- Marco Serna, Santa Fe County district attorney
- Kyle Tisdel, environmental attorney

===== Withdrawn =====
- Robert Apodaca, businessman and former United States Department of Agriculture regional official
- Mark McDonald, chair of the Colfax County Democratic Party (endorsed Serna)

===== Declined =====
- Hector Balderas, attorney general of New Mexico
- Brian Egolf, speaker of the New Mexico House of Representatives
- Valerie Espinoza, New Mexico Public Regulation Commissioner for the 3rd district and former Santa Fe County clerk
- Paula Garcia, executive director of the New Mexico Acequia Association
- Stephanie Garcia Richard, New Mexico Commissioner of Public Lands
- Ben Ray Luján, incumbent U.S. representative (running for U.S. Senate)
- Joseph Maestas, mayor of Española and former Santa Fe city councilman
- Andrea Romero, state representative
- John Sapien, state senator
- Victor Snover, mayor of Aztec
- Carl Trujillo, former state representative
- Linda Trujillo, state representative
- JoAnne Vigil Coppler, Santa Fe city councilwoman
- Renee Villarreal, Santa Fe city councilwoman
- Alan Webber, mayor of Santa Fe
- Peter Wirth, majority leader of the New Mexico Senate

==== Endorsements ====
John Blair

Organizations

- Congressional LGBTQ Equality Caucus
- LGBTQ Victory Fund
Teresa Leger Fernandez

U.S. representatives

- Deb Haaland, representative from New Mexico's 1st congressional district
- Alexandria Ocasio-Cortez, representative from New York's 14th congressional district

Organizations

- Center for Biological Diversity
- Courage to Change
- Emily's List
- End Citizens United
- Jicarilla Apache Nation
- League of Conservation Voters Action Fund
- NARAL Pro-Choice America
- Planned Parenthood Action Fund
- Sierra Club
- Taos Pueblo
- Working Families Party

Newspapers

- Santa Fe Reporter
Valerie Plame

Organizations

- VoteVets
Marco Serna

State and local politicians

- Gary King, former attorney general of New Mexico
- Mark McDonald, chair of the Colfax County Democratic Party

==== Polling ====
Poll source	Date(s) administered	Sample size	Margin of error	Teresa Fernandez	Valerie Plame	Joseph Sanchez	Marco Serna	Other	Undecided
Clarity Campaign Labs (Note: This poll's sponsor had endorsed Teresa Legar Fernandez prior to the sampling period)	May 20–21, 2020	661 (LV)	± 3.76%	33%	24%	7%	9%	9% (Note: John Blair 4%, Laura Montoya 3%, Kyle Tiesel 2%)	–
Anzalone Liszt Grove Research (Note: Poll was sponsored by Plame's campaign)	February 11–16, 2020	500 (LV)	–	11%	21%	–	7%	–	–

==== Pre-primary convention results ====
Candidates for the Democratic nomination needed to either receive the votes of 20% of the delegates at the pre-primary convention on March 7, or collect and submit signatures to the secretary of state to have made it to the June 2 primary.

Candidate	Delegates	
Candidate	Vote	%
John Blair	19	4.5%
Teresa Leger Fernandez	178	41.9%
Laura Montoya	87	20.5%
Valerie Plame	22	5.2%
Joseph Sanchez	52	12.2%
Marco Serna	57	13.4%
Kyle Tisdel	10	2.4%
Total	425	100.0%

==== Results ====
Democratic primary results
Party	Candidate	Votes	%
Democratic	Teresa Leger Fernandez	44,480	42.8
Democratic	Valerie Plame	25,775	24.8
Democratic	Joseph L. Sanchez	12,292	11.8
Democratic	Marco Serna	8,292	8.0
Democratic	Laura M. Montoya	6,380	6.1
Democratic	John Blair	4,533	4.4
Democratic	Kyle Tisdel	2,176	2.1
Total votes		103,928	100.0

=== Republican primary ===
==== Candidates ====
===== Nominee =====
- Alexis Johnson, environmental engineer and rancher

===== Eliminated in primary =====
- Karen Bedonie, member of the Navajo Nation and small business owner
- Harry Montoya, former Santa Fe County commissioner

===== Disqualified =====
- Audra Lee Brown, businesswoman
- Anastacia Golden Morper, real estate agent

===== Withdrawn =====
- Brett Kokinadis, founder of New Mexico Democrats for Democracy

===== Declined =====
- Jefferson Byrd, New Mexico Public Regulation Commissioner for the 2nd district and nominee for New Mexico's 3rd congressional district in 2014
- Gregg Hull, mayor of Rio Rancho
- Patrick H. Lyons, former New Mexico Public Regulation Commissioner for the 2nd district, former New Mexico Commissioner of Public Lands, and former state senator
- Thomas Mullins, businessman and nominee for New Mexico's 3rd congressional district in 2010

==== Results ====
Republican primary results
Party	Candidate	Votes	%
Republican	Alexis Johnson	16,512	36.7
Republican	Harry Montoya	15,919	35.4
Republican	Karen Bedonie	12,477	27.8
Republican	Angela Gale Morales (Write-in)	30	0.1
Total votes		44,938	100.0

=== Libertarian primary ===
==== Candidates ====
===== Nominee =====
- Michael Lucero, rancher and nominee for New Mexico Commissioner of Public Lands in 2018

=== Green primary ===
==== Candidates ====
===== Declined =====
- Carol Miller, activist and nominee for New Mexico's 3rd congressional district in 1997, 1998, and 2008

=== General election ===
==== Debate ====
2020 New Mexico's 3rd congressional district debate
No.	Date	Host	Moderator	Link	Democratic	Republican
Key: P Participant A Absent N Not invited I Invited W Withdrawn						
Key: P Participant A Absent N Not invited I Invited W Withdrawn					Teresa Leger Fernandez	Alexis Johnson
1	Oct. 7, 2020	KOAT-TV; The Albuquerque Journal	Doug Fernandez; Shelly Ribando; Kent Walz		P	P

==== Predictions ====
Source	Ranking	As of
The Cook Political Report	Safe D	July 2, 2020
Inside Elections	Safe D	June 2, 2020
Sabato's Crystal Ball	Safe D	July 2, 2020
Politico	Safe D	April 19, 2020
Daily Kos	Safe D	June 3, 2020
RCP	Safe D	June 9, 2020
Niskanen	Safe D	June 7, 2020

==== Polling ====
Poll source	Date(s) administered	Sample size	Margin of error	Teresa Leger Fernandez (D)	Alexis Johnson (R)	Undecided
Research & Polling Inc.	October 23–29, 2020	347 (LV)	± 5.3%	58%	35%	6%
Research & Polling Inc.	August 26 – September 2, 2020	301 (LV)	± 5.6%	50%	35%	15%

==== Results ====
New Mexico's 3rd congressional district, 2020
Party	Candidate	Votes	%
Democratic	Teresa Leger Fernandez	186,282	58.7
Republican	Alexis Johnson	131,166	41.3
Total votes		317,448	100.0
Democratic hold			

== See also ==
- 2020 New Mexico elections

== Notes ==
Partisan clients
