= Mela Leger =

Proponent of bilingual education in New Mexico

- Born: Manuelita de Atocha Romero Lucero; 1928
- Died: 2006 (aged 77–78)
- Education: Loretta Heights College; New Mexico Highlands University
- Occupations: Educator, school founder
- Known for: Advocate for bilingual education
- Spouse: Ray Leger
- Children: Teresa Leger Fernandez

Manuelita de Atocha Leger (née Romero Lucero; 1928–2006), known as Mela Leger, was an early proponent for bilingual education in New Mexico. With her husband Ray Leger, she helped write the 1973 Bilingual Multicultural Education Act, which provided for Spanish and Indigenous languages to be taught in New Mexico K12 schools.

== Early life ==
When Leger first attended school in New Mexico, she spoke only Spanish. During that time, children were punished for speaking Spanish in class. After graduating from Loretta Heights College in Denver, she married Ray Leger, another influential advocate for bilingual education in New Mexico who later became state senator.

== Career ==
After earning her master's degree and teaching certificate from New Mexico Highlands University, she was one of a small numbers of educators throughout the nation who participated in pilot testing, national discussion, and curriculum development for bilingual children. After teaching Spanish-speaking children how to read English in the national pilot program, she traveled to meet with educators, parents, and lawmakers throughout the state to advocate for the benefits of bilingual education.

Early in her career as a teacher, she founded one of the first bilingual multicultural elementary schools in the nation, which was visited by national and state policy makers and educators.

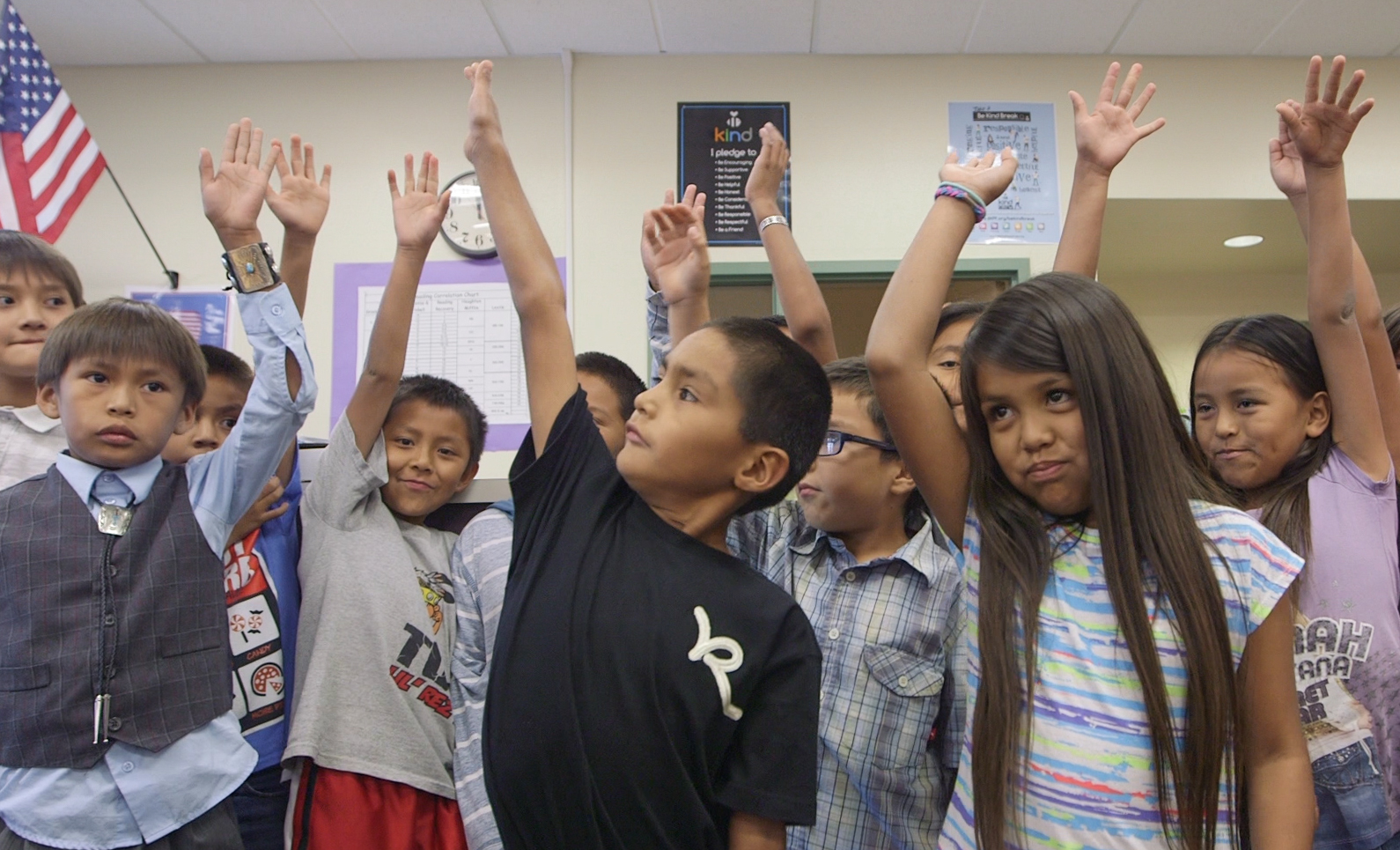
Third graders learning the Navajo language on their reservation in Arizona.

Along with her husband, Leger was a major contributor to New Mexico's 1973 Bilingual Multicultural Education Law, the first of its kind in the nation. In 1975, New Mexico created the first teaching endorsement for ESL (English for Speakers of Other Languages) in the nation.

Leger trained generations of bilingual teachers during her tenure at the Teacher Training Center in Las Vegas, New Mexico, as well as the University of New Mexico. As of 2016, Indigenous languages offered in New Mexico schools included Jicarilla, Apache, Keres, Navajo, Tewa, Tiwa, Towa, and Zuni.

== Legacy ==
During the implementation phase of the New Mexico Historic Women Marker Initiative from 2006-2010, Leger was selected to be honored with a historic marker for her contributions to education that is listed in the Historical Marker Database.

== Personal life ==
Her daughter, Teresa Leger Fernandez, currently serves New Mexico's 3rd congressional district as U.S. Representative.
