= Luna Community College =

Public college in Las Vegas, New Mexico, US

- Type: Public community college
- Established: 1969; 57 years ago
- President: Edward Martinez
- Location: Las Vegas, New Mexico, United States; 35.6159°N 105.2529°W
- Nickname: Rough Riders
- Website: www.luna.edu

Luna Community College is a public community college in Las Vegas, New Mexico. The college also has campuses in Mora, Springer and Santa Rosa.

== History ==
The college was founded in 1969 as the result of a 1967 act of authorization by the New Mexico Legislature. Legislation to establish the school was sponsored by State Senator Ray Leger. The school was named "Luna Area Vocational Technical School" after Captain Maximiliano Luna, who was a Speaker of the New Mexico House of Representatives and a member of the Rough Riders. The name was changed in 2000 to Luna Community College.

In 2017, LCC faced losing its accreditation after a series of governance problems and allegations of nepotism and financial wrongdoing surfaced by the Higher Learning Commission. LCC managed to maintain their accreditation. However, in November 2019, the Higher Learning Commission extended the college's probation, concluding that the institution remains out of compliance with two criteria for accreditation and meets five other criteria with concerns. In November 2020 the Commission reevaluated the college and removed its probationary status.
