= Roger Montoya =

American politician

Member of the New Mexico House of Representatives from the 40th district
- In office January 19, 2021 – December 31, 2022
- Preceded by: Joseph L. Sanchez
- Succeeded by: Joseph L. Sanchez

Personal details
- Born: February 3, 1961 (age 65) Denver, Colorado, U.S.
- Party: Democratic
- Domestic partner: Salvador Ruiz-Esquivel (2007–present)
- Education: Long Beach City College (AA)
- Occupation: Gymnast; dancer; painter
- Website: rogermontoyafornm.com

Roger Evan Montoya (born February 3, 1961) is an American humanitarian, painter, former professional dancer and gymnast, and a former politician who served as a member of the New Mexico House of Representatives from the 40th district. Elected in 2020, he assumed office on January 19, 2021, and served in office until December 31, 2022. He is the co-founder of several organizations, including Moving Arts Española, La Tierra Montessori School for the Arts and Sciences, and Española Pathways Shelter. On April 20, 2023, the New Mexico Public Education Commission voted to revoke La Tierra Montessori School for the Arts and Science's charter. He was nominated for the 2019 CNN Hero of the Year.

== Early life and education ==
Roger Evan Montoya was born to Jose Amado and Dorotea Montoya in Denver, Colorado, on February 3, 1961. He has three brothers and two sisters. At the age of seven, Montoya started formal training in gymnastics taking classes at the University of Denver. He attended Adams City High School before transferring to Westminster High School to join a gymnastics team. Though his parents struggled financially, they let Montoya be legally adopted by distant relatives who lived in the Westminster, Colorado area, in order to be able to enroll in the gymnastics program. He remained involved in competitive teams throughout his high school years and by the time he was 14, he went to the 1976 Summer Olympics training camp in Romania with Nadia Comăneci, using the money he had earned selling his paintings. Eventually, it landed him a scholarship at the California State University, Long Beach. After three years at the university, Montoya was injured during a gymnastics competition where he had a concussion. He then decided to study visual arts and dance. Around this time, he met choreographer Mary Jane Eisenberg who had just moved to the city after performing with the Louis Falco Dance Company in New York, and was a substitute teacher in one of his classes. Few months later, Montoya joined her dance company Shale in Los Angeles. Montoya earned an associate degree from Long Beach City College.

While still in college, Montoya appeared in two gay pornographic films, Spring Training (1985) and Hot Male Mechanics (1985) under the names Joe Savage and Eric Martinez. In 1984, he left Los Angeles with his boyfriend who was battling AIDS with the intention of building a house near his family home in New Mexico. After his boyfriend's death later that year, he moved to New York City, began taking classes at the Alvin Ailey American Dance Theater and joined the David Parsons Dance Company. Montoya also tested positive for HIV antibodies in 1986 but continued to dance and focus on his art. An injury to company member led to the substitution of Montoya joining Parsons program Friday in Royce Hall, UCLA. After five years in New York City, he made a decision to put his dance career on hold and primarily focus on his health.

== Career ==
In 1990, Montoya moved back to Velarde, New Mexico and began relearning painting by focusing on the New Mexico landscape. He got a grant from the University of New Mexico to teach gymnastics to local children. Between 1990 and 1995, more than 2,000 children enrolled in the program. Approached by Nora Naranjo Morse, who had seen his landscapes at a crafts festival, Montoya submitted some figurative paintings to illustrate a children's book she had written. Given a short deadline, he completed eleven paintings in sixteen days and his illustrations were used in the book A First Clay Gathering (1994).

In 1994, he decided to come out as HIV positive and in order to raise the topic with his neighbors, he invited his students and their parents to a special meeting. He spoke candidly about his condition and about how difficult it is to transmit HIV and assured his audience that he would not be teaching if he had any fear at all that he might be endangering his students. When Montoya was finished, the father of one student accused Montoya of infecting his family and took his child and stormed out. Several other students have dropped out of Montoya's class, but most have stayed. In 1996, he and his mother, a veteran health care provider, started Española HELPS (HIV, Education, Longevity, Prevention, and Support), an HIV awareness organization. Between 1998 and 2004, Montoya focused on painting, selling his paintings mostly at The Spanish Market, an annual market event held in Santa Fe, New Mexico. In 2002, he created an Arts in the Schools program bringing in local artists to public elementary schools, where he met his partner Salvador Ruiz-Esquivel.

=== 2008–present: Moving Arts Española and humanitarian work ===
With the help of his partner, Montoya opened Moving Arts Española, an after-school program for children of all ages, in 2008. When arts funding began to dry up during the advent of No Child Left Behind and the rise of standardized, statewide PARCC testing, he applied to begin a Montessori charter school, La Tierra, which would have a relationship with the Moving Arts after-school programs. With the donation of some buildings that sat unused after the Ohkay Owingeh casino expanded, Moving Arts built a theater seating 300, seven classroom studios, and a gallery. They began offering nutrition education, culinary training, and food, with the assistance of Help New Mexico, a USDA-funded program.

By the beginning of 2019, Montoya was approached by Ralph Martinez with the plan of establishing the first homeless shelter in Española, New Mexico. The Española Pathways Shelter opened on January 17, 2020. In November, Montoya was nominated for a CNN Hero for his humanitarian work.

=== 2020 New Mexico House of Representatives campaign ===
On January 27, 2020, Montoya announced his campaign for the New Mexico House of Representatives against Republican Justin Salazar-Torres. On June 2, he won the Democratic nomination over Matthew Elias Gonzales with 2,962 votes (56.18%) compared to Gonzales' 2,317 votes (43.95%). In September, his past in pornographic films was exposed in a conservative news organization Piñon Post article claiming that "the investigative report found that Montoya appears to have had unprotected sex in multiple gay films." The Republican Party of New Mexico immediately called on Montoya to withdraw from the political race calling his past work "irresponsible," reckless," and "unbecoming of any candidate or elected official."

On October 5, Montoya released an official statement on his campaign Facebook page, saying "Thirty-eight years ago, as a 22-year-old struggling college student, I was a modern dancer and performer living in Los Angeles. I worked hard to earn my own way, never relying on anyone else, including my parents. I was auditioning for commercials and doing my best to succeed. Among those choices were two adult films I acted in as an adult, with other adults, in a very different environment and time. I am not proud of that choice, as I was young and naïve, but those experiences helped me to understand the exploitation young people face. Those experiences do not reflect who I am, and they are insignificant in the scope of my life's work, yet they helped inspire my dedication to my community and the work I do to make sure that youth have opportunities, support and confidence." He also added that "the GOP dredging up this past amounted to a distraction from the real issues at stake in the November election." The state Democratic Party supported Montoya, calling out the GOP Chair Steve Pearce for launching "an unacceptable and hypocritical attack on Montoya in an attempt to shame a gay man for a choice made in the distant past, while ignoring Donald Trump's long record of illicit conduct."

In the November 2020 general election, Montoya defeated Salazar-Torres by 13 points.

== Personal life ==
Montoya is openly gay. He came out to his family when he was sixteen. In 1994, he disclosed that he is HIV-positive. He had tested positive for HIV antibodies eight years earlier after his boyfriend's death and began anti-retroviral treatment. While he remained asymptomatic, he lost three partners to AIDS and assumed his own death was imminent. "I felt a strong, deep calling to come home to family to prepare to die," he said. He has since discontinued the use of AZT and has moved to natural alternatives included his own organically grown produce, vitamins, massage, Chinese herbs, colonic therapy and acupuncture.

In 2007, Montoya met his long-time partner Salvador Ruiz-Esquivel while working on his Arts in the Schools program.

== Filmography ==
Year	Title	Role	Notes
1983	Nudes in Limbo	Athlete	Documentary
1984	Breakin' 2: Electric Boogaloo	Gymnast	
1985	Spring Training		Video
1985	Hot Male Mechanics	Car Customer	
