= Seth Martin (politician) =

American politician

Member-elect of the New Mexico House of Representatives from the 63rd district
- Assuming office January 2027
- Succeeding: Martin R. Zamora

Personal details
- Party: Republican

Seth Martin is an American politician. A member of the Republican Party, he is the member-elect for the 63rd district of the New Mexico House of Representatives.
