= Joseph L. Sanchez =

American politician

Joseph Sanchez

Member of the New Mexico House of Representatives from the 40th district
- Incumbent
- Assumed office January 17, 2023
- Preceded by: Roger Montoya
- In office January 17, 2019 – January 19, 2021
- Preceded by: Nick Salazar
- Succeeded by: Roger Montoya

Personal details
- Born: Joseph Louis Sanchez Alcalde, New Mexico, U.S.
- Party: Democratic
- Education: University of New Mexico (BS, MS); New Mexico State University (MBA)

Joseph Louis Sanchez is an American politician representing the 40th district in the New Mexico House of Representatives since January 1, 2023 and previously from January 17, 2019 to January 19, 2021. Prior to entering state politics, Sanchez was an electrical engineer. He is a member of the Democratic Party.

== Early life and education ==
Sanchez was born and raised in Alcalde, New Mexico, a small farming community in Northern New Mexico. Sanchez earned a Bachelor of Science in electrical engineering from the University of New Mexico and two master's degrees, one in electrical engineering from the University of New Mexico and one in business administration, from New Mexico State University.

== Career ==
Sanchez was elected to the New Mexico House of Representatives in the 2018 elections. He ran for the New Mexico's 3rd congressional district seat in the United States House of Representatives in the 2020 elections. Sanchez finished third in the June 2, Democratic primary. In 2022 he ran for election to his former house seat and defeated his successor Roger Montoya in the Democratic primary.

=== Results ===
Democratic primary results
Party	Candidate	Votes	%
Democratic	Teresa Leger Fernandez	44,480	42.8
Democratic	Valerie Plame	25,775	24.8
Democratic	Joseph L. Sanchez	12,292	11.8
Democratic	Marco Serna	8,292	8.0
Democratic	Laura M. Montoya	6,380	6.1
Democratic	John Blair	4,533	4.4
Democratic	Kyle Tisdel	2,176	2.1
Total votes		103,928	100.0

== Personal life ==
Sanchez lives in Alcalde, New Mexico.
