= Ray Leger =

American politician

Member of the New Mexico Senate from the 8th district
- In office 1973–1980

Personal details
- Born: January 6, 1925 Las Vegas, New Mexico, U.S.
- Died: October 14, 2009 (aged 84) Las Vegas, New Mexico, U.S.
- Party: Democratic
- Other political affiliations: Republican (pre-1960s)
- Spouse: Mela
- Children: 7, including Teresa
- Education: New Mexico Highlands University (BA, MEd)

Military service
- Allegiance: United States
- Branch/service: United States Army
- Battles/wars: World War II

Ray Leger (January 6, 1925 – October 14, 2009) was an American politician and educator who served as a member of the New Mexico Senate for the 8th district from 1973 to 1980.

== Early life and education ==
Leger was born on January 6, 1925, in Las Vegas, New Mexico, the 11th of 14 children. After graduating from Las Vegas High School, Leger served in the United States Army during the end of World War II. He later earned a Bachelor of Arts and Master of Education from New Mexico Highlands University.

== Career ==
After earning his master's degree, Leger began working as an educator in Northern New Mexico. He later served as Superintendent of West Las Vegas Schools. Through a partnership with the United States Department of State, Leger worked as an educational advisor to the Costa Rica Ministry of Public Education.

Initially a member of the Republican Party, Leger registered as a Democrat in the late-1960s. Leger was a delegate to the 1969 New Mexico Constitutional Convention. He served as a member of the New Mexico Senate for the 8th district from 1973 to 1980. During his tenure, Leger focused on public education and health services legislation. As a state senator, he supported a bill that provided funding for Luna Community College. He also worked to support the Bilingual Education Act. After leaving the Senate, Leger worked as a lobbyist until his retirement in 2003.

== Personal life ==
Leger met his wife, Mela, while attending New Mexico Highlands University. The couple had seven children, including U.S. Representative Teresa Leger Fernandez. Leger died on October 14, 2009, in Las Vegas, New Mexico.

Leger and his wife, Mela, are commemorated by a roadside plaque in Guadalupe County for their contributions to bilingual education.
