= New Mexico's congressional districts =

U.S. House districts in the State of New Mexico

Map of New Mexico's congressional districts since 2023 Interactive map version

New Mexico is divided into three congressional districts, each represented by a member of the United States House of Representatives.

The people of the state are currently represented in the 118th United States Congress by three Democrats: Melanie Stansbury, Gabe Vasquez, and Teresa Leger Fernandez.

== Current districts and representatives ==
This is a list of United States representatives from New Mexico, district boundaries, and the district political ratings, according to the CPVI. The delegation has a total of 3 members, all three Democrats.

Current U.S. representatives from New Mexico
District	Member (Residence)	Party	Incumbent since	CPVI (2025)	District map
1st	Melanie Stansbury (Albuquerque)	Democratic	June 14, 2021	D+7	
2nd	Gabe Vasquez (Las Cruces)	Democratic	January 3, 2023	EVEN	
3rd	Teresa Leger Fernandez (Santa Fe)	Democratic	January 3, 2021	D+3	

== Historical elections summary ==
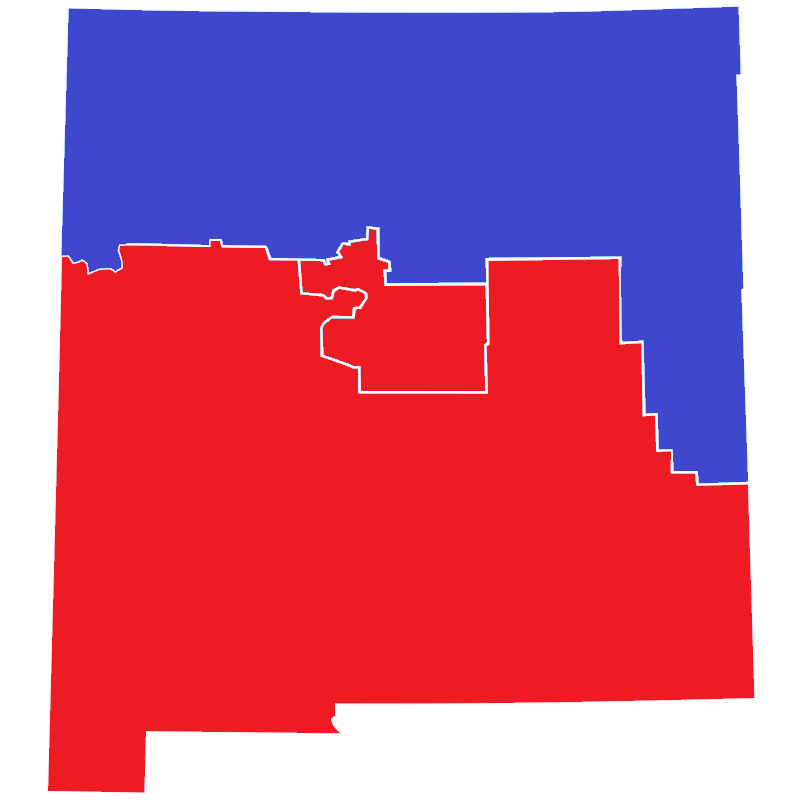
2002

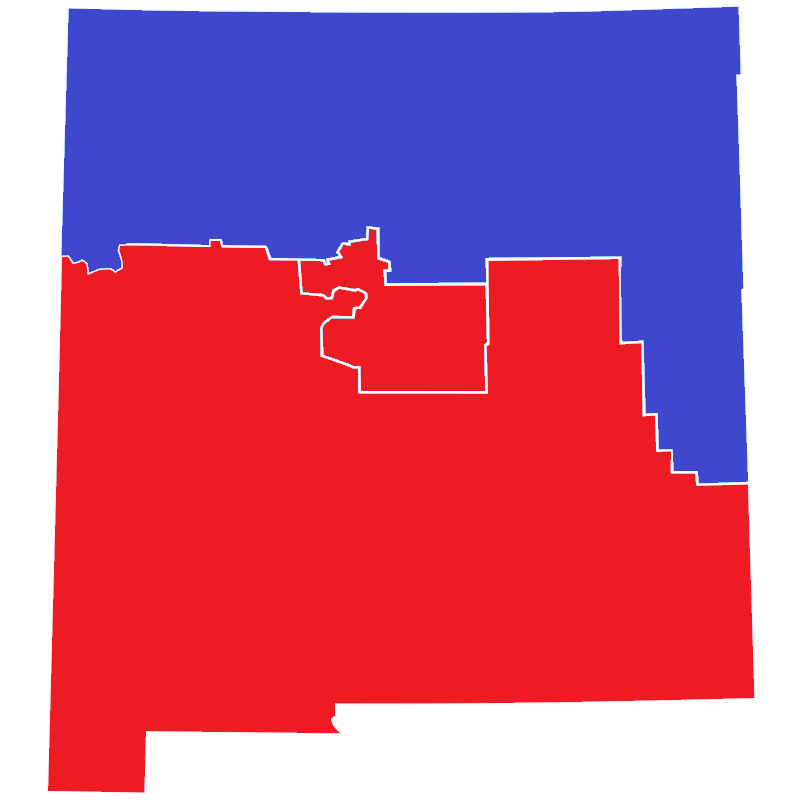
2004

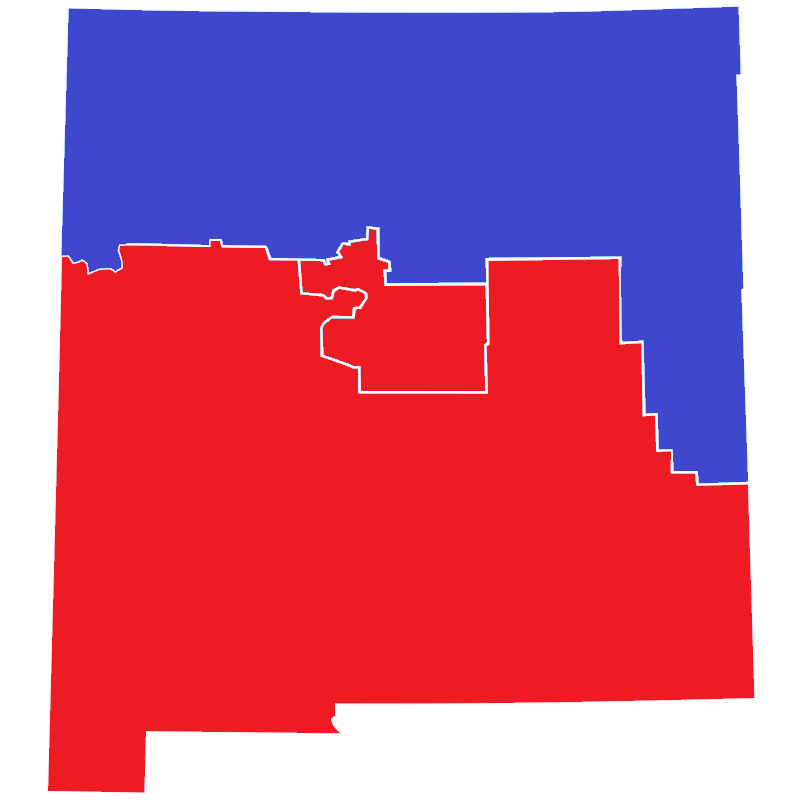
2006

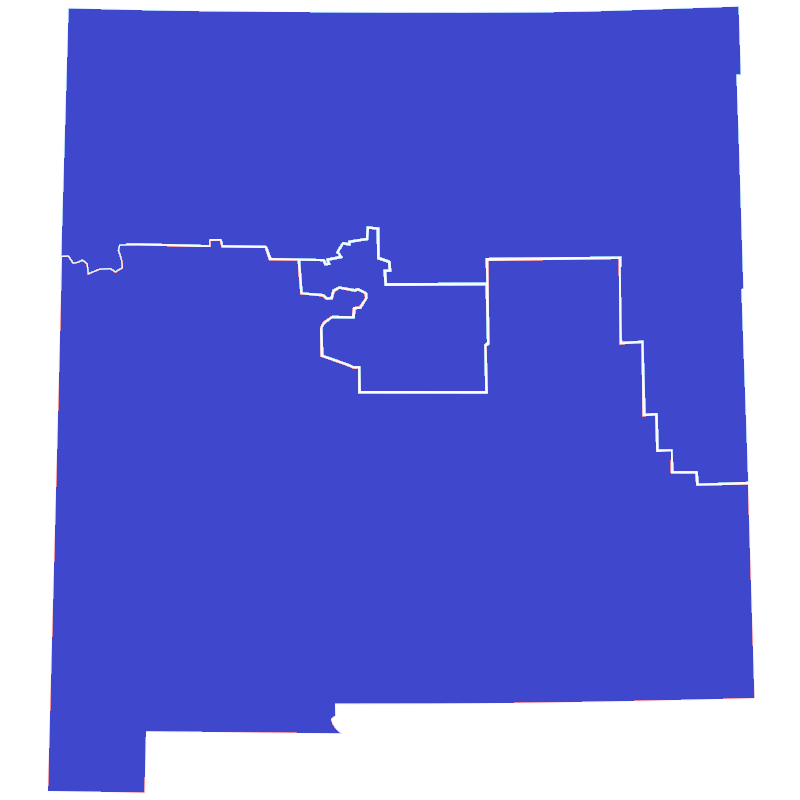
2008

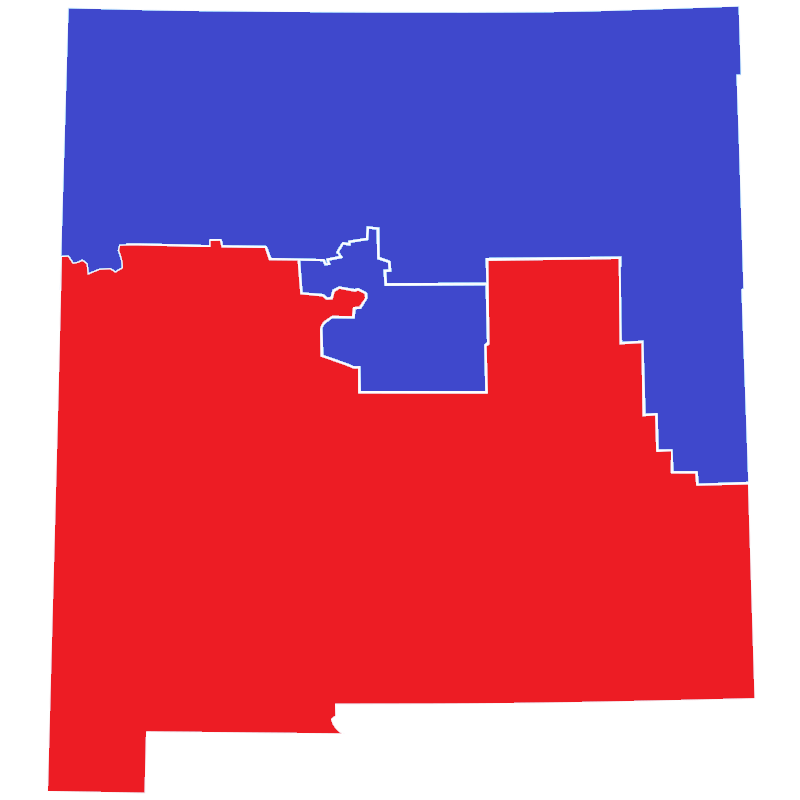
2010

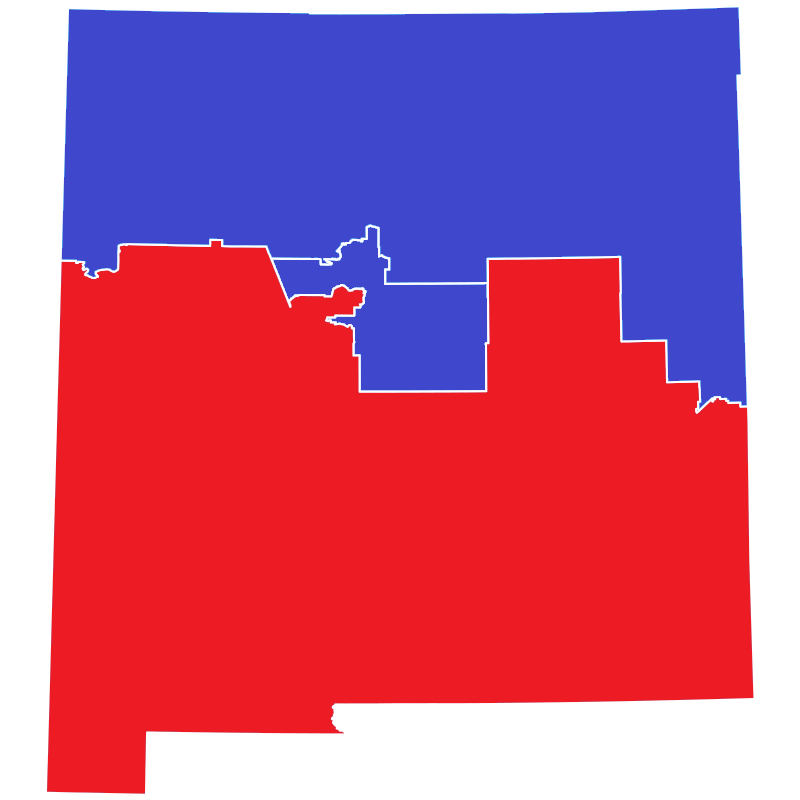
2012

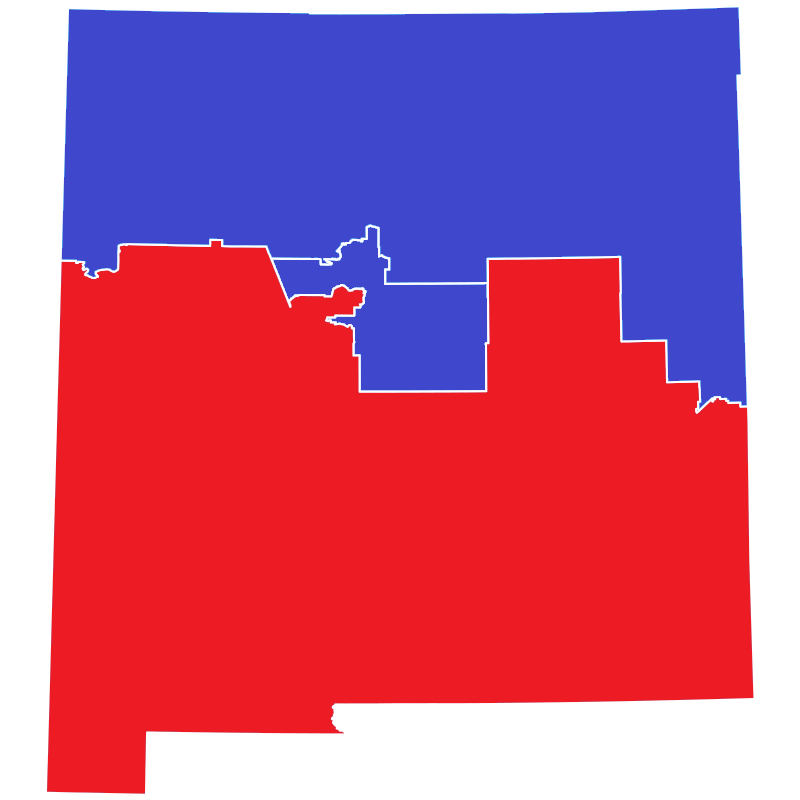
2014

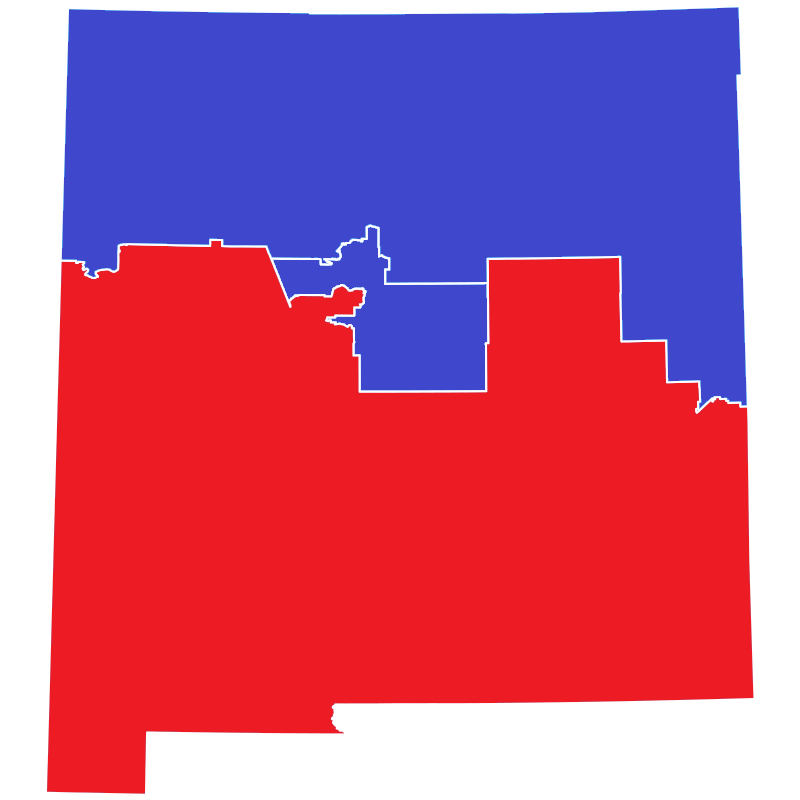
2016

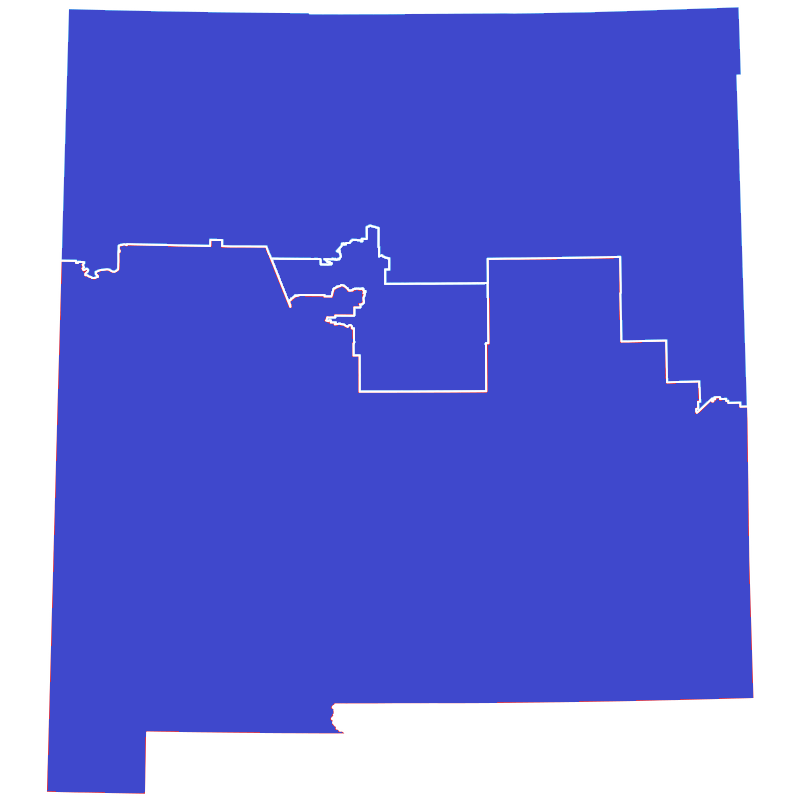
2018

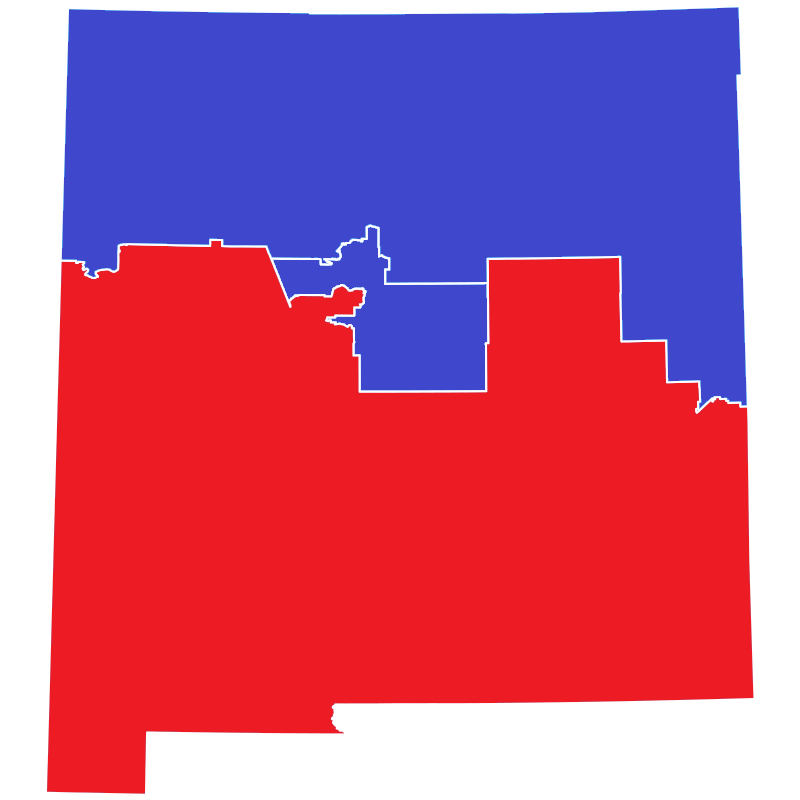
2020

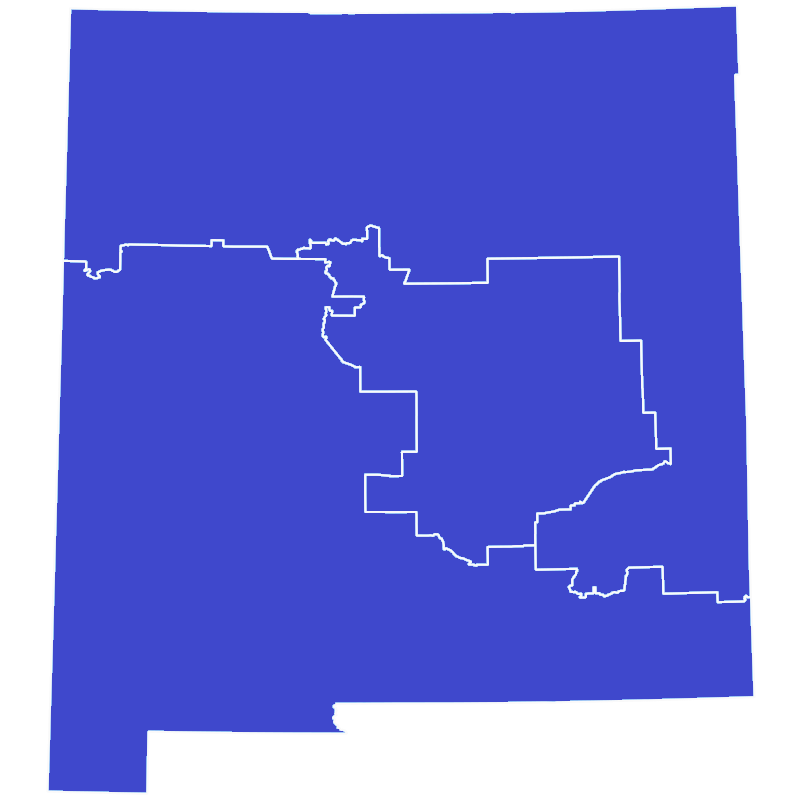
2022

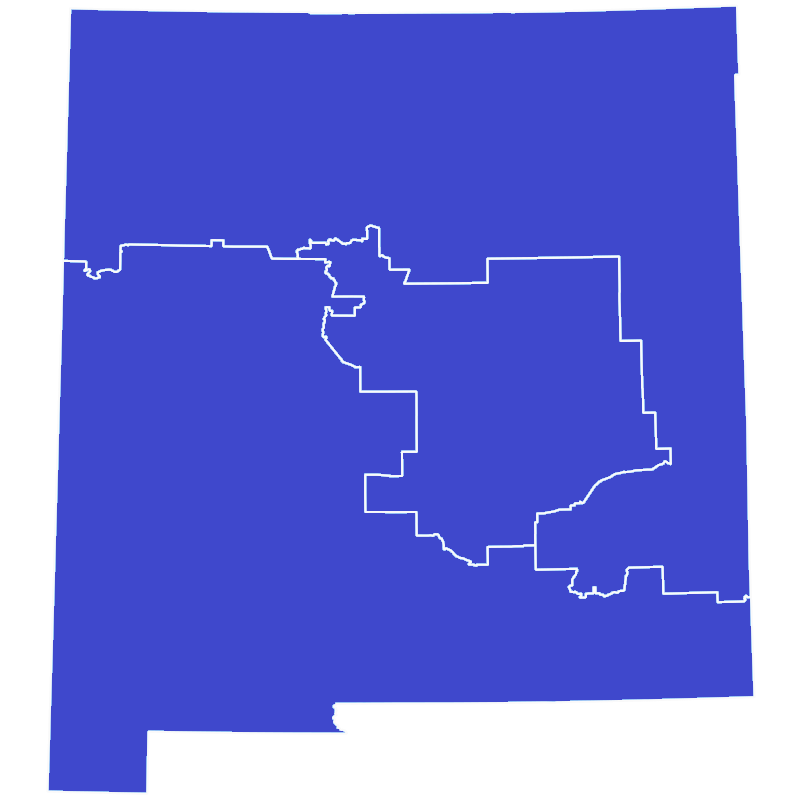
2024

In 2018, Ben Ray Luján was handily elected to a fifth term in the 3rd district and Deb Haaland was elected in the 1st district to fill the seat vacated by Michelle Lujan Grisham when she became governor. The sole Republican representative, from the 2nd District, Steve Pearce retired and was replaced in a highly competitive race by Xochitl Torres Small, a Democrat, leaving the entire state congressional delegation under Democratic control.

In 2020, Representative Xochitl Torres Small was defeated in her bid for re-election by Republican candidate Yvette Herrell, in a rematch of the 2018 election. Deb Haaland successfully defended her seat against a challenge from perennial Republican candidate Michelle Garcia Holmes. Additionally, Representative Ben Ray Luján stepped down from his seat in the 3rd district, in order to run for New Mexico's open Senate seat, which was made vacant by Senator Tom Udall's retirement. Representative Luján won Senator Udall's open senate seat, and Democratic candidate Teresa Leger Fernandez won Representative Luján's open seat over Republican challenger Alexis Martinez Johnson.

Following the 2020 election, New Mexico was the first state to send multiple Native American women as part of their congressional delegation, as Representative Herrell was a member of the Cherokee Nation, and Representative Haaland was a member of the Laguna Pueblo. This made New Mexico one of two states to have multiple Native American representatives, along with Oklahoma. Melanie Ann Stansbury was elected in a special election in 2021 when Deb Haaland resigned to become Secretary of the Interior.

In 2022, Democrats Melanie Ann Stansbury in the 1st and Teresa Leger Fernandez in the 3rd handily won re-election. In the competitive 2nd district Gabriel "Gabe" Vasquez eked out a win over Republican incumbent Yvette Herrell.

In 2024, all three Democrats were re-elected.

== Historical and present district boundaries ==
Until the 1968 elections, New Mexico's representatives were all elected at-large. Starting in 1968, they were elected by districts. For the first election, under the new system of congressional districts in 1968, there were only two, drawn on the basis of the census of 1960. They were not changed after the census of 1970, "because the deviation from the average population of 508,000 was only .62 % ."

Table of United States congressional district boundary maps in the State of New Mexico is presented chronologically. All redistricting events that took place in New Mexico between 1973 and 2013 are shown.

Year	Statewide map	Albuquerque highlight
1968–1983		All included in district 1.
1983–1993		
1993–2003		
2003–2013		
2013–2023		
Since 2023		

== See also ==
- List of United States congressional districts
