= Teresa Leger Fernández =

American politician and attorney (born 1959)

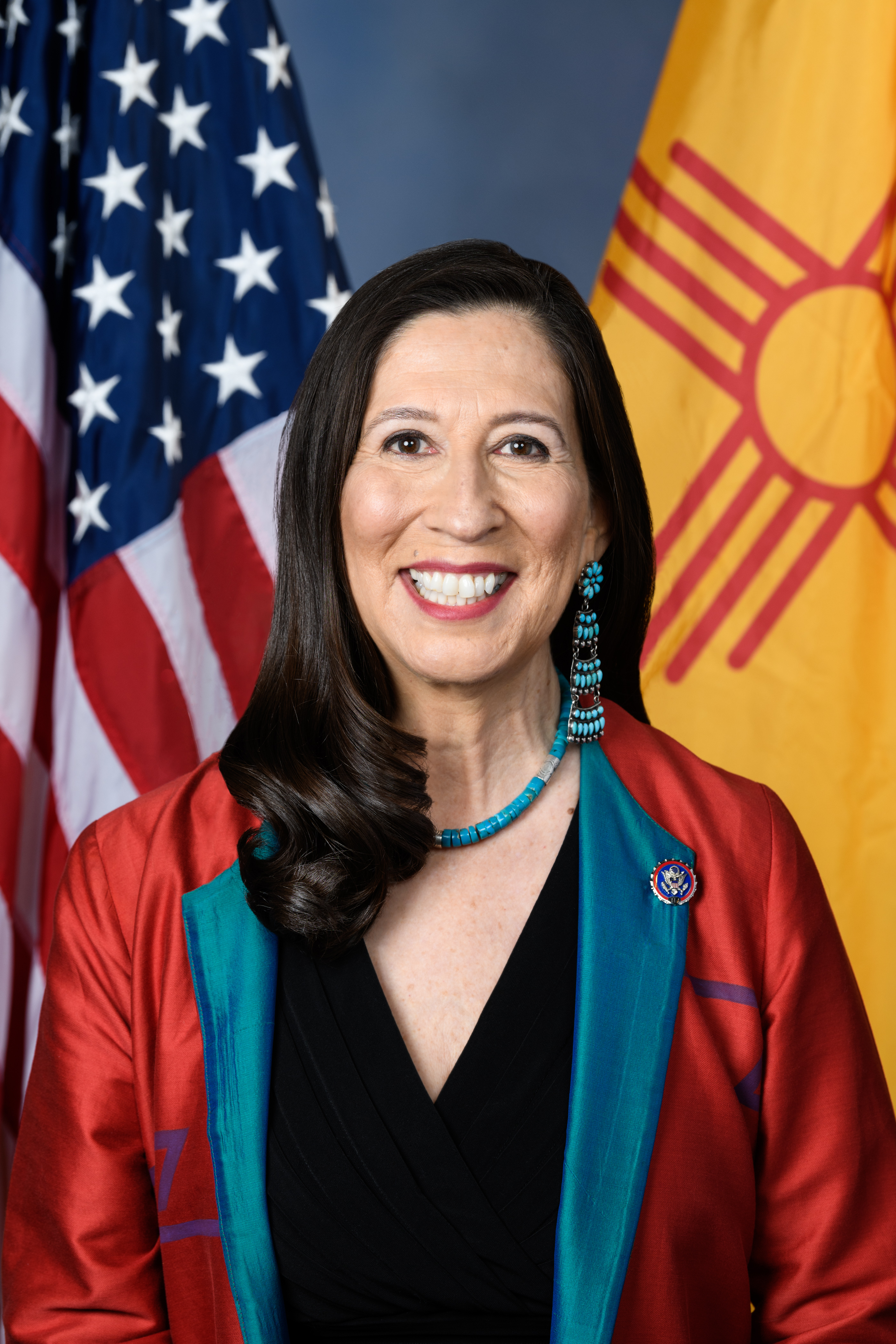
- Official portrait, 2021

Member of the U.S. House of Representatives from New Mexico's 3rd district
- Incumbent
- Assumed office January 3, 2021
- Preceded by: Ben Ray Luján

Personal details
- Born: Teresa Isabel Leger; July 1, 1959 (age 67) Las Vegas, New Mexico, U.S.
- Party: Democratic
- Spouse: Luis Fernández (divorced)
- Children: 3
- Parents: Ray Leger (father); Mela Leger (mother)
- Education: Yale University (BA); Stanford University (JD)
- Website: House website Campaign website
- Leger Fernández's voice Leger Fernández on alcohol and substance abuse. Recorded June 23, 2022

Teresa Isabel Leger Fernández (/ˈlɛdʒər fərˈnændɛz/ LEJ-ər fər-NAN-dez; born July 1, 1959) is an American attorney and politician representing New Mexico's 3rd congressional district in the United States House of Representatives since 2021.

== Early life and education ==
Teresa Leger was born in Las Vegas, New Mexico. Her mother, Mela Leger, was a bilingual educator and her father, Ray Leger, served as a member of the New Mexico Senate. After graduating from West Las Vegas High School, Leger Fernández earned a Bachelor of Arts degree from Yale University and a Juris Doctor from the Stanford Law School.

== Career ==
After graduating from law school, Leger Fernández returned to New Mexico to work as an attorney, specializing in community-building and tribal advocacy. She was a White House fellow during the Clinton administration and later served on the Advisory Council on Historic Preservation during the Obama administration. She also worked as a liaison between the White House Office and the Department of Housing and Urban Development. For 30 years, Leger Fernández operated Leger Law and Strategy, LLC in Santa Fe. The firm focuses on community development, tribal advocacy, civil rights, and social justice. In 2017, she led a successful effort to implement ranked-choice voting in Santa Fe's municipal elections.

== U.S. House of Representatives ==
=== Elections ===
==== 2020 ====
After incumbent representative Ben Ray Luján announced that he would not seek reelection in 2020 and instead run for the United States Senate seat being vacated by Tom Udall, Leger Fernández announced her candidacy to succeed Luján. In the Democratic primary, she faced six opponents, including New Mexico state representatives Joseph L. Sanchez and Valerie Plame, an author and former CIA officer. During the campaign, Leger Fernández was endorsed by Congresswoman Deb Haaland, EMILY's List, and The Santa Fe New Mexican.

A political progressive, Leger Fernández was also endorsed by the Working Families Party, Elizabeth Warren, and Alexandria Ocasio-Cortez. She placed first in the primary with over 42% of the vote.

In the November general election, Leger Fernández defeated Republican nominee Alexis Johnson. She assumed office on January 3, 2021.

=== Committee assignments ===
- Committee on Natural Resources
  - Subcommittee on Federal Lands
  - Subcommittee on Indian and Insular Affairs
- Committee on Rules
  - Subcommittee on Legislative and Budget Process (Ranking Member)

=== Caucus membership ===
- Congressional Hispanic Caucus, Vice Chair of Communications
- Democratic Women's Caucus, Chair
- National Labs Caucus, Co-chair
- Rural Broadband Caucus, Co-chair
- Congressional Progressive Caucus
- Diabetes Caucus
- Labor Caucus
- LGBTQ+ Equality Caucus
- Mental Health Caucus
- National Heritage Area Caucus
- Native American Caucus
- PFAS Caucus
- Pro-Choice Caucus
- Rural Caucus
- Rare Disease Caucus
- Ski Caucus

=== Political positions ===
Leger Fernández has advocated a "New Mexico Green New Deal", Medicare for All, a transition from fracking to green energy, and a ban on the sale of military-style semi-automatic rifles. She supported comprehensive immigration reform and the DREAM Act. During the 117th Congress, she voted with President Joe Biden's stated position 100% of the time, according to a FiveThirtyEight analysis. She also has called for a 'pause' on data center development in New Mexico.

== Personal life ==
Leger Fernández and her ex-husband Luis Fernández have three sons.

== Electoral history ==
2020 United States House of Representatives election in New Mexico, District 3
Party	Candidate	Votes	%
Democratic	Teresa Leger Fernández	186,282	58.68%
Republican	Alexis Johnson	131,166	41.32%
Total votes		317,448	100.0%
Democratic hold			

2022 United States House of Representatives election in New Mexico, District 3
Party	Candidate	Votes	%
Democratic	Teresa Leger Fernández (incumbent)	134,217	58.16%
Republican	Alexis Johnson	96,565	41.84%
Total votes		230,782	100.0%
Democratic hold			

2024 United States House of Representatives election in New Mexico, District 3
Party	Candidate	Votes	%
Democratic	Teresa Leger Fernández (incumbent)	162,342	56.29%
Republican	Sharon Clahchischilliage	126,085	43.71%
Total votes		288,427	100.0%
Democratic hold			

== See also ==
- List of Hispanic and Latino Americans in the United States Congress
- Women in the United States House of Representatives

U.S. House of Representatives
Preceded by Ben Ray Luján	Member of the U.S. House of Representatives from New Mexico's 3rd congressional district 2021–present	Incumbent
Party political offices
Preceded by Lois Frankel	Chair of the Democratic Women's Caucus; 2025–present	Incumbent
U.S. order of precedence (ceremonial)
Preceded by Young Kim	United States representatives by seniority 259th	Succeeded by Nancy Mace
