= Government of New Mexico =

Overview of the government of the U.S. state of New Mexico

- Great Seal of the State of New Mexico
- Polity type: Presidential republic Federated state
- Constitution: Constitution of New Mexico

Legislative branch
- Name: Legislature
- Type: Bicameral
- Meeting place: New Mexico State Capitol
- Upper house
- Name: Senate
- Presiding officer: Howie Morales, President
- Lower house
- Name: House of Representatives
- Presiding officer: Javier Martínez, Speaker

Executive branch
- Head of state and government
- Title: Governor
- Currently: Michelle Lujan Grisham
- Appointer: Election
- Cabinet
- Name: Cabinet
- Leader: Governor
- Deputy leader: Lieutenant Governor
- Headquarters: New Mexico State Capitol

Judicial branch
- Name: Judiciary of New Mexico
- Courts: Courts of New Mexico
- Supreme Court
- Chief judge: David K. Thomson
- Seat: New Mexico Supreme Court Building, Santa Fe

The government of New Mexico is the governmental structure of the state of New Mexico as established by the Constitution of New Mexico. The executive is composed of the governor, several other statewide elected officials and the governor's cabinet. The New Mexico Legislature consists of the House of Representatives and Senate. The judiciary is composed of the New Mexico Supreme Court and lower courts. There is also local government, consisting of county administrations, city governments, and special districts.

== Executive ==
The state elected officials are:

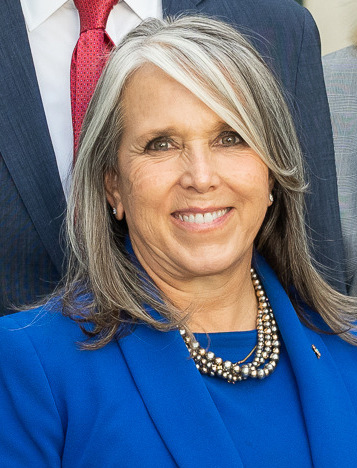
Michelle Lujan Grisham (D)
Governor

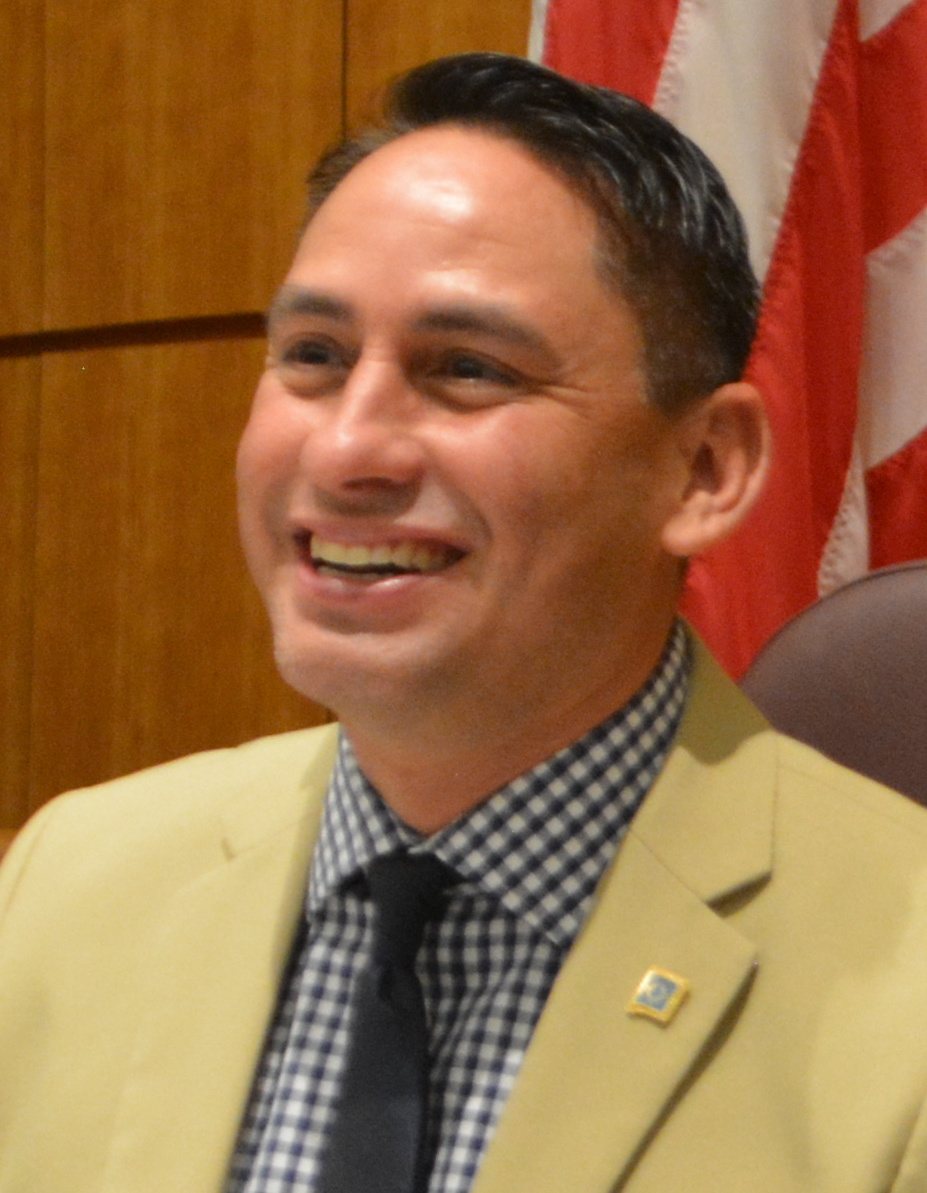
Howie Morales (D)
Lieutenant governor

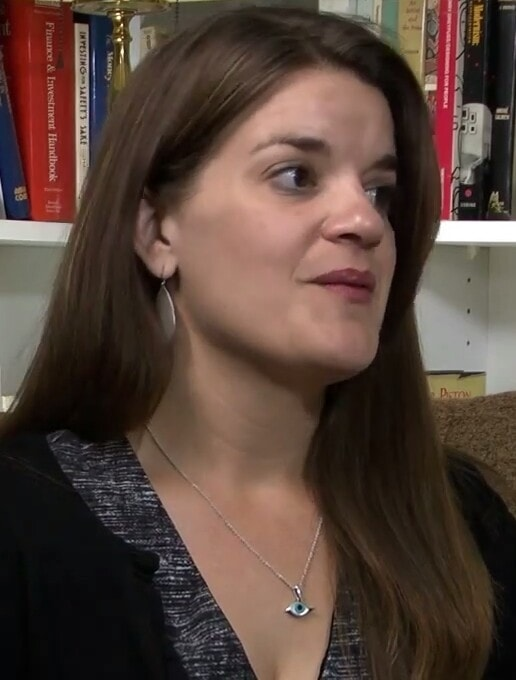
Maggie Toulouse Oliver (D)
Secretary of State

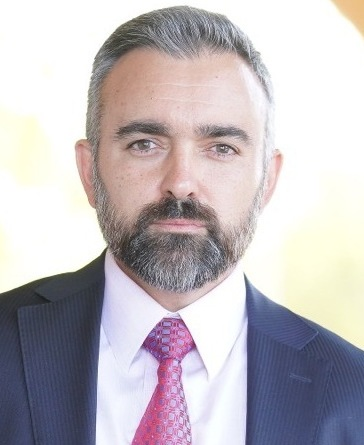
Raúl Torrez (D)
Attorney General

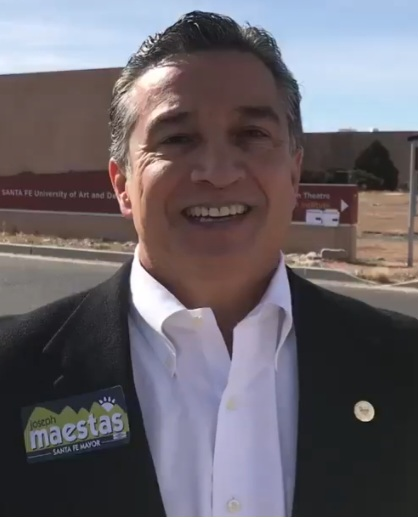
Joseph Maestas (D)
State Auditor

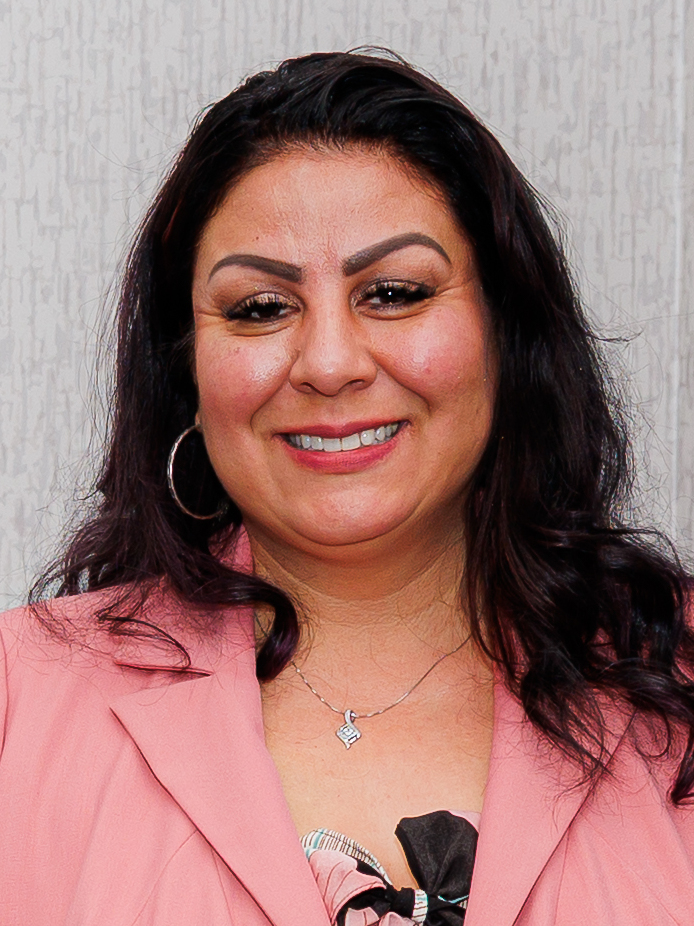
Laura Montoya (D)
State Treasurer

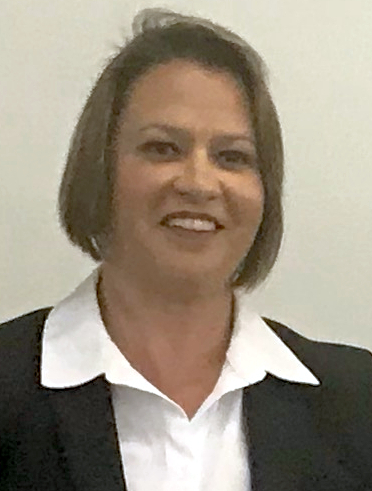
Stephanie Garcia Richard (D)
Commissioner of Public Lands

The New Mexico Governor's Cabinet includes:

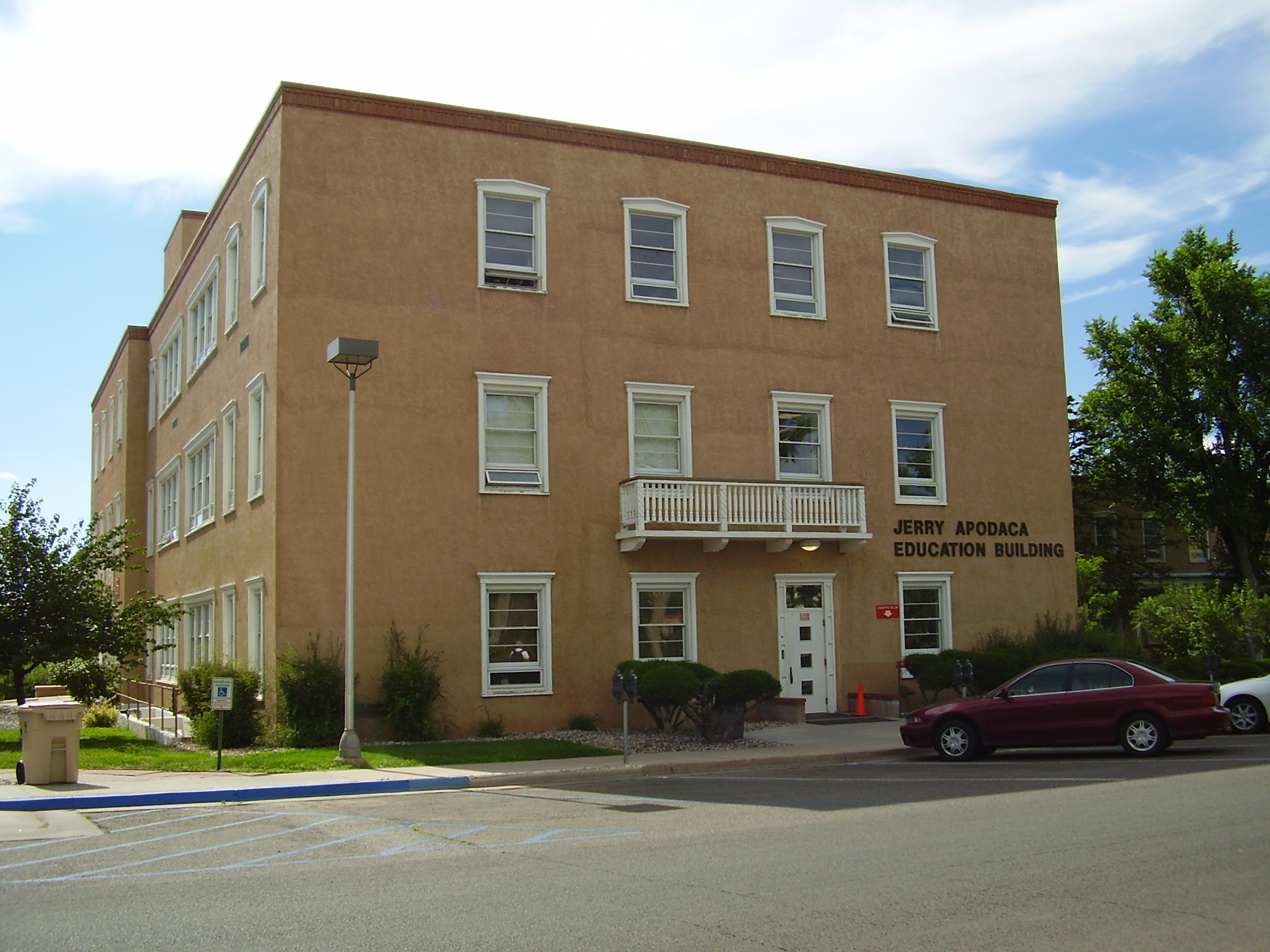
The Jerry Apodaca Education Building of the New Mexico Public Education Department

- Office of African American Affairs
- Department of Aging and Long-Term Services
- Department of Agriculture
- Department of Children, Youth, and Families
- Department of Corrections
- Department of Cultural Affairs
- Department of Economic Development
- Department of Energy, Minerals, and Natural Resources
- Office of the State Engineer
- Department of Environment
- Department of Finance and Administration
- Department of General Services
- Department of Health
- Department of Higher Education
- Department of Homeland Security and Emergency Management
- Department of Human Services
- Department of Indian Affairs
- Department of Information Technology
- Office of State Personnel
- Department of Public Education
- Department of Public Safety
- Department of Regulation and Licensing
- Department of Taxation and Revenue
- Department of Tourism
- Department of Transportation
- Department of Veteran Services
- Department of Worker's Compensation
- Department of Workforce Solutions

== Legislature ==
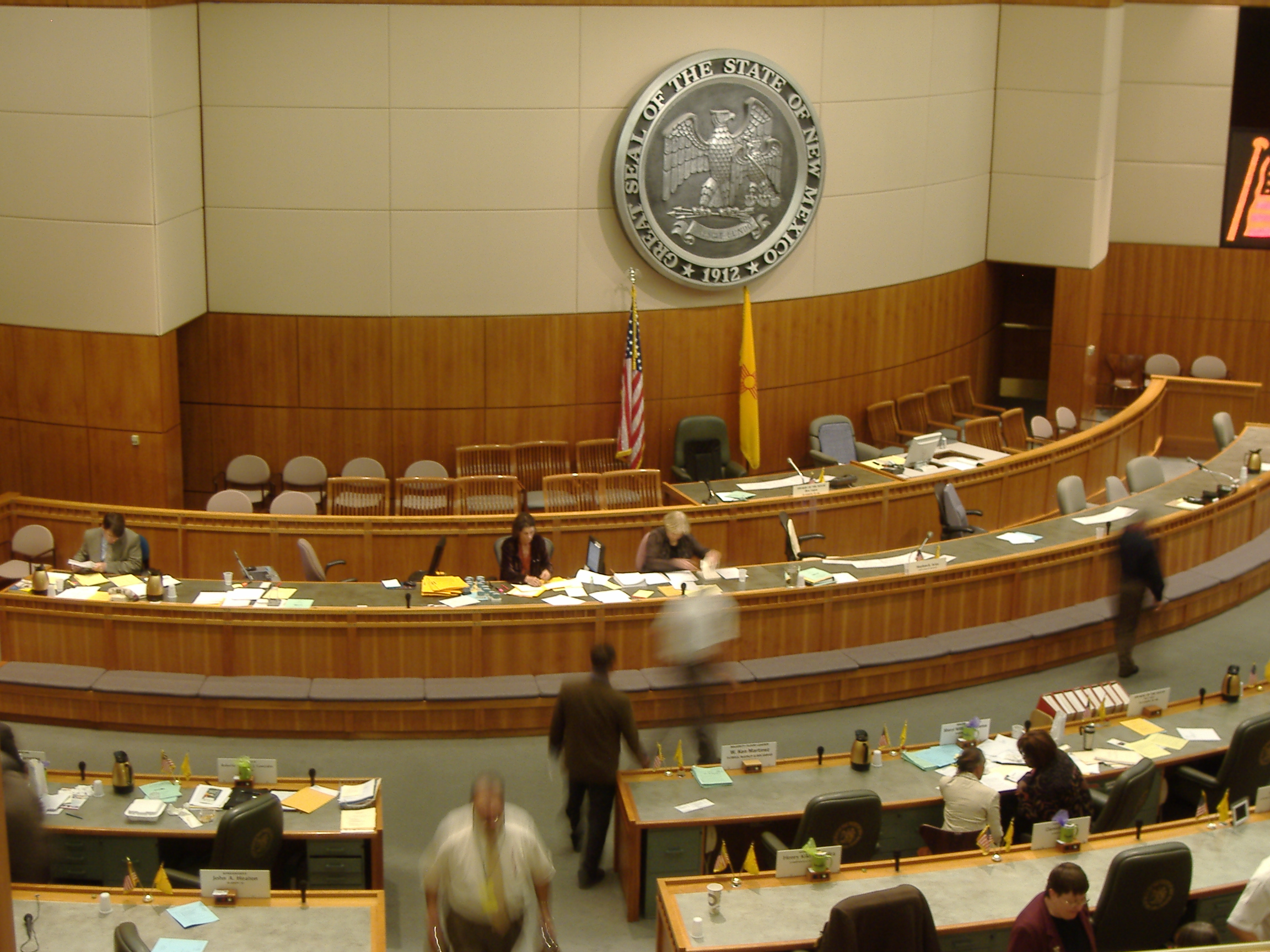
The Senate Chamber of the New Mexico State Capitol

The New Mexico Legislature is a bicameral body made up of the 70-member New Mexico House of Representatives and the 42-member New Mexico Senate. The New Mexico Constitution limits the regular session to sixty calendar days, and every other year it is thirty days. The lieutenant governor presides over the Senate, while the speaker of the House is elected from that body in a closed door majority member caucus. Both have wide latitude in choosing committee membership in their respective houses and have a large impact on lawmaking in the state.

== Judiciary ==
The New Mexico Supreme Court is the highest court. It is primarily an appellate court, only having original jurisdiction in a limited number of actions; criminal cases in which the death penalty or life imprisonment is sought, appeals from the New Mexico Public Regulation Commission, and cases involving the writ of habeas corpus are reviewed directly by the Supreme Court. The court's five justices are chosen by statewide election, or appointed by the governor if to fill a seat that has become vacant mid-term.

The New Mexico Court of Appeals is the intermediate-level appellate court. The court has general appellate jurisdiction over the district courts and certain state agencies. Ten judges preside, sitting in panels of three.

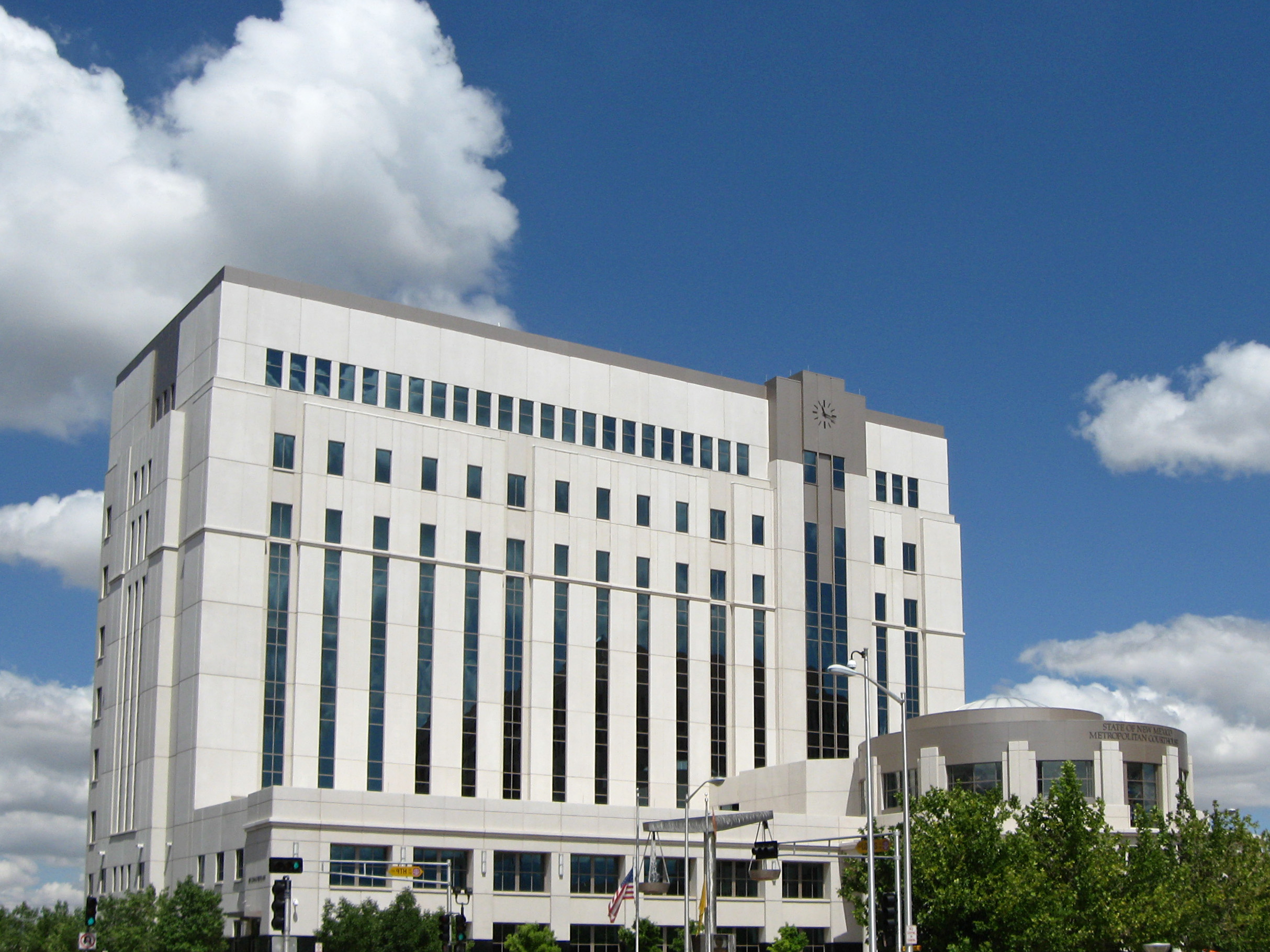
The Albuquerque Metropolitan Courthouse of the Bernalillo County Metropolitan Court

The New Mexico district courts are courts of general jurisdiction. They hear cases involving: tort, contract, real property rights, estate; exclusive domestic relations, mental health, appeals for administrative agencies and lower courts, miscellaneous civil jurisdiction; misdemeanor; exclusive criminal appeals jurisdiction; and exclusive juvenile jurisdiction. There are thirteen judicial districts.

The New Mexico magistrate courts are courts of limited jurisdiction. They hear cases involving: tort, contract, landlord/tenant rights ($0–10,000); felony preliminary hearings; and misdemeanor, DWI/DUI and other traffic violations. There are fifty-four magistrate courts.

The New Mexico probate courts are courts of limited jurisdiction and do not hold jury trials. There is one for each of New Mexico's thirty-three counties.

The New Mexico municipal courts are courts of limited jurisdiction and do not hold jury trials. They hear cases involving: petty misdemeanors, DWI/DUI, traffic violations and other municipal ordinance violations.

The Bernalillo County Metropolitan Court is a court of limited jurisdiction of Bernalillo County. It hears cases involving: tort, contract, landlord and tenant rights ($0–10,000); felony first appearances; misdemeanor, DWI/DUI, domestic violence, and other traffic violations.

== Local government ==
Local government in New Mexico consists of counties and municipalities. There are thirty-three counties, of which Bernalillo County, containing the state's largest city Albuquerque, is the most populous. Counties are usually governed by an elected five-member county commission, sheriff, assessor, clerk and treasurer. A municipality may call itself a village, town, or city, and there is no distinction in law and no correlation to any particular form (Mayor-Council, Commission-Manager, etc.). Municipal elections are non-partisan. In addition, limited local authority can be vested in special districts and landowners' associations.
