= New Mexico Governor's Cabinet =

The Cabinet of the Governor of New Mexico is a body of the most senior appointed officials of the executive branch of the government of New Mexico.

The executive leaders of the agencies below are subject to confirmation by the New Mexico Senate.

== Cabinet departments ==
Department	Title	Incumbent
Office of African American Affairs	Acting Executive Director	Charles Reado
Aging and Long Term Services Department	Cabinet Secretary Designate	Jen Paul Schroer
Children, Youth, and Families Department	Acting Cabinet Secretary	Valerie Scandoval
New Mexico Corrections Department	Cabinet Secretary	Alisha Tafoya Lucero
Department of Agriculture	Director	Jeff Witte
Department of Cultural Affairs	Cabinet Secretary Designate	Debra Garcia y Griego
Department of Finance and Administration	Cabinet Secretary	Wayne Propst
Department of Game and Fish	Director	Michael Sloan
Department of Health	Cabinet Secretary	Gina DeBlassie
Department of Homeland Security and Emergency Management	Cabinet Secretary	David Dye
Indian Affairs Department	Cabinet Secretary	Vacant
Department of Information Technology	Cabinet Secretary Designate	Manny Barreras
Department of Military Affairs	Adjutant General	Major General Miquel Aguilar
Department of Public Safety	Cabinet Secretary	Jason R. Bowie
Department of Transportation	Cabinet Secretary	Ricky Serna
Department of Veterans Services	Cabinet Secretary Designate	Brigadier General Jamison Herrera
Department of Workforce Solutions	Cabinet Secretary	Sarita Nair
Economic Development Department	Acting Cabinet Secretary	Jon Clark
Energy, Minerals, and Natural Resources Department	Acting Cabinet Secretary	Erin Taylors
Environment Department	Cabinet Secretary	James Kenney
General Services Department	Cabinet Secretary	Robert E. Doucette, Jr.
Higher Education Department	Cabinet Secretary	Stephanie Rodriguez
Health Care Authority	Cabinet Secretary	Kari Armijo
Office of the State Engineer	State Engineer	Mike A. Hamman, P.E.
Public Education Department	Cabinet Secretary	Dr. Arsenio Romero
Regulation and Licensing Department	Superintendent	Clayton Bailey
State Personnel Office	Director	Dylan Lange
Taxation and Revenue Department	Cabinet Secretary	Stephanie Schardin Clarke
Tourism Department	Acting Cabinet Secretary	Lancing Adams
Workers' Compensation Administration	Acting Director	Leigh Martinez
Office of the Superintendent of Insurance	Superintendent	Russell Toal

== See also ==
- Government of New Mexico
