= NMMP =

NMMP may refer to:

- United States Navy Marine Mammal Program
- New Mexico Mounted Patrol
