= List of law enforcement agencies in New Mexico =

This is a list of law enforcement agencies in the state of New Mexico.

According to the US Bureau of Justice Statistics' 2008 Census of State and Local Law Enforcement Agencies, the state had 146 law enforcement agencies employing 5,010 sworn police officers, about 252 for each 100,000 residents. This is almost exactly the national average of policemen to residents in the United States.

== State agencies ==
- New Mexico Department of Public Safety
  - New Mexico State Police
- New Mexico Mounted Patrol
- New Mexico Attorney General's Office
- New Mexico Board of Pharmacy
- New Mexico Corrections Department
- New Mexico Department of Game and Fish
- New Mexico Energy, Minerals and Natural Resources Department
  - New Mexico State Forestry Division
    - Special Agents
  - New Mexico State Parks Division
    - Park Rangers
- New Mexico Livestock Board
- New Mexico Taxation and Revenue Department
  - Office of the Inspector General
  - Tax Fraud Investigations Division

== County agencies ==
- Bernalillo County Sheriff's Department
- Catron County Sheriff's Department
- Chaves County Sheriff’s Office
- Cibola County Sheriff's Office
- Colfax County Sheriff's Office
- Curry County Sheriff's Office
- De Baca County Sheriff's Office
- Doña Ana County Sheriff's Office
- Eddy County Sheriff's Office
- Grant County Sheriff's Department
- Guadalupe County Sheriff's Office
- Harding County Sheriff's Department
- Hidalgo County Sheriff's Department
- Lea County Sheriff's Department
- Lincoln County Sheriff's Office
- Los Alamos County Police Department
- Luna County Sheriff's Office
- McKinley County Sheriff's Office
- Mora County Sheriff's Office
- Otero County Sheriff's Department
- Quay County Sheriff's Office
- Rio Arriba County Sheriff's Office
- Roosevelt County Sheriff's Office
- San Juan County Sheriff's Office
- San Miguel County Sheriff's Office
- Sandoval County Sheriff's Office
- Santa Fe County Sheriff's Office
- Sierra County Sheriff's Office
- Socorro County Sheriff's Department
- Taos County Sheriff's Department
- Torrance County Sheriff's Department
- Union County Sheriff's Office
- Valencia County Sheriff's Office

== City agencies ==
- Alamogordo Police Department
- Albuquerque Police Department
- Angel Fire Police Department
- Anthony Police Department
- Artesia Police Department
- Aztec Police Department
- Bayard Police Department
- Belen Police Department
- Bernalillo Police Department
- Bloomfield Police Department
- Bosque Farms Police Department
- Buena Vista Police Department
- Capitan Police Department
- Carlsbad Police Department
- Carrizozo Police Department
- Cerrillos Police Department
- Chama Police Department
- Clayton Police Department
- Cloudcroft Police Department
- Clovis Police Department
- Corrales Police Department
- Cuba Police Department
- Deming Police Department
- Edgewood Police Department
- Española Police Department
- Estancia Police Department
- Farmington Police Department
- Gallup Police Department
- Grants Police Department
- Hatch Police Department
- Hobbs Police Department
- Hurley Police Department
- Jemez Springs Police Department
- Las Cruces Police Department
- Las Vegas Police Department
- Lordsburg Police Department
- Los Alamos Police Department
- Los Lunas Police Department
- Loving Police Department
- Lovington Police Department
- Magdalena Police Department
- Mesilla Marshal's Department
- Mora Police Department
- Moriarty Police Department
- Mountainair Police Department
- Placitas Police Department
- Portales Police Department
- Raton Police Department
- Red River Marshal's Office
- Rio Rancho Police Department
- Roswell Police Department
- Ruidoso Police Department
- San Ysidro Marshal's Office
- Sandia Park Police Department
- Santa Fe Police Department
- Santa Clara Police Department
- Silver City Police Department
- Socorro Police Department
- Sunland Park Police Department
- Taos Police Department
- Tijeras Police Department
- Truth Or Consequences Police Department
- Tucumcari Police Department
- Vaughn Police Department

== Tribal agencies ==
- Acoma Pueblo Police Department
- Cochiti Pueblo Police Department
- Isleta Pueblo Police Department
- Jemez Pueblo Police Department
- Jicarilla Apache Police Department
- Laguna Pueblo Police Department
- Mescalero Apache Police Department
- Nambe Pueblo Police Department
- Navajo Nation Department of Law Enforcement
  - Chinle Police District
  - Crownpoint Police District
  - Dilcon Police District
  - Kayenta Police District
  - Shiprock Police District
  - Tuba City Police District
- Picuris Pueblo Police Department
- Pojoaque Pueblo Police Department
- Ramah Navaho Chapter Police Department
- Sandia Tribal Police
- San Felipe Pueblo Police Department
- San Ildefonso Pueblo Police Department
- San Juan Pueblo Police Department
- Santa Ana Pueblo Police Department
- Santa Clara Pueblo Police Department
- Santo Domingo Pueblo Police Department
- Taos Pueblo Police Department
- Tesuque Pueblo Police Department
- Zia Pueblo Police Department
- Zuni Pueblo Police Department

== College and university agencies ==
- Eastern New Mexico University Police Department
- New Mexico Highlands University Police Department
- New Mexico Institute of Mining and Technology Police Department
- New Mexico Military Institute Police Department
- New Mexico State University Police Department
- University of New Mexico Police Department
- Western New Mexico University Police Department

== Other agencies ==
- Burlington Northern Santa Fe Railway Police
- Bureau of Indian Affairs Police
- Albuquerque Public Schools Police
- Office of the United States Marshal for the District of New Mexico
