= Bill McCamley =

American politician (born 1978)

Secretary of the New Mexico Department of Workforce Solutions
- In office January 2019 – April 2021
- Governor: Michelle Lujan Grisham

Member of the New Mexico House of Representatives from the 33rd district
- In office 2013–2019
- Preceded by: Joni Gutierrez
- Succeeded by: Micaela Lara Cadena

Personal details
- Born: April 1, 1978 (age 48) Pusan, South Korea
- Party: Democratic
- Education: New Mexico State University (BA); Harvard University (MPP)

Bill McCamley is an American politician who served as the secretary of the New Mexico Department of Workforce Solutions from 2019 to 2021. Previously, he served as a Democratic member of the New Mexico House of Representatives from 2013 to 2018.

== Early life and education ==
McCamley was born in Pusan, South Korea while his father was serving in the United States Army. He earned a Bachelor of Arts in government from New Mexico State University and a Master of Public Policy from the Harvard Kennedy School.

== Career ==
Before serving in the New Mexico House of Representatives, McCamley was a Doña Ana County commissioner from 2005 to 2008.

McCamley was a candidate for the Democratic nomination for New Mexico State Auditor in the 2018 election. He lost the Democratic primary election to Brian Colón. McCamley has been an outspoken advocate of legalizing recreational marijuana in the state of New Mexico.
