= New Mexico State Police =

- Patch of New Mexico State Police
- Abbreviation: NMSP

Agency overview
- Formed: February 15, 1905; 121 years ago
- Preceding agencies: New Mexico Mounted Police (1905-1921); New Mexico Motor Patrol (1933-1935)

Jurisdictional structure
- Operations jurisdiction: New Mexico, United States
- Area: 121,665 square miles (315,110 km^{2})
- Population: 2,130,256 (2024 est.)
- Legal jurisdiction: New Mexico
- General nature: Civilian police

Operational structure
- Headquarters: Santa Fe, New Mexico
- State Police Officers: 671 State Police Officers (authorised, as of 2021)
- Civilian Members: 141 Civilian Members (as of 2014)
- Agency executive: Troy Weisler, Chief
- Parent agency: New Mexico Department of Public Safety

Website
- sp.nm.gov

The New Mexico State Police (NMSP) is the law enforcement agency under the New Mexico Department of Public Safety in the U.S. state of New Mexico. It has jurisdiction anywhere in the state, often working in tandem with local and federal law enforcement. Founded in 1905, NMSP's official mission is to protect the lives, property and constitutional rights of the people of New Mexico.

== History ==
=== World War I ===
During World War I, national security became a great concern, particularly in border states like New Mexico. The mounted police were reactivated and kept the border with Mexico secure, as well as provided general law enforcement services. For the next several years, the mounted police gained quite a reputation as an effective and professional police force, much to the disdain of the state's lawbreakers, who often had strong political ties in Santa Fe. Finally, on February 15, 1921, almost sixteen years after its inception, the New Mexico Mounted Police was abolished. In 1937, it was resurrected once again as a volunteer police organization. In 1941, the New Mexico Legislature made the volunteer police organization an official state law enforcement agency as it stands today called the New Mexico Mounted Patrol.

=== New Mexico Motor Patrol ===
The advent of the automobile again highlighted the need for a statewide law enforcement agency. No other police force had jurisdictional authority to enforce laws throughout the state. In 1933, the New Mexico Motor Patrol was established, primarily to enforce traffic laws. The patrol had a civilian oversight board consisting of Governor Arthur Seligman, Attorney General E.K. Neumann, and Highway Engineer Glenn D. Macy. The state of Texas had recently created their own motor patrol, and they detailed Captain Homer Garrison to conduct the first New Mexico Motor Patrol recruit school at St. Michael's College in Santa Fe. 135 men applied for the school, eighteen were selected to attend, and ten were finally chosen and commissioned as the first motor patrol officers. Each officer was issued a Harley Davidson motorcycle with siren, red light, and other accessories. One of the ten graduates, Earl Irish, was appointed as the Chief and was given a monthly salary of $150; Patrolmen made $125 monthly. Officers were allowed $10 per month to maintain their uniforms.

The Motor Patrol proved to be a great success and within a few months of its existence, had generated more than enough revenue to fund itself. A radio broadcasting system was set up that depended on a commercial radio station, KOB, in Albuquerque. Every week, officers would wire law enforcement matters to be disseminated to the chief in Santa Fe, who would see that KOB broadcast the information twice each day, except Sunday. In this way, motor patrol officers communicated information to each other such as descriptions of wanted suspects and stolen goods.

=== New Mexico State Police ===
By 1935, the need to expand the authority and responsibility of the motor patrol was widely recognized. The Twelfth State Legislature changed the name of the organization to the New Mexico State Police and gave its officers full police powers to enforce all laws of the state and complete statewide jurisdiction. The authorized strength was raised to 30 officers; the ranks of sergeant, lieutenant, and captain were added; and salaries were increased. The uniform adopted in 1936 is still in use today, with the exception of the riding breeches and boots favored by motorcycle officers.

== Equipment ==
The NMSP issues the Smith & Wesson M&P in 9mm. The agency previously issued Smith & Wesson .357, S&W 45, Glock 22 in .40 caliber, Glock 31 in .357 SIG.

The New Mexico State Police also operated the Eurocopter AS350B Écureuil medical helicopter, which crashed on October 19, 2001 during training, killing officers Damon Talbott and Ramon Robert Solis.

Currently the NMSP Aircraft Section operates an Airbus H145 (Registered N607SP) which in early 2020 replaced an AgustaWestland AW109E - (Registered N606SP) that was also involved in an incident on June 9th, 2009 during a Search and Rescue operation, the pilot and Sergeant Andrew Francis Tingwall were killed.

== Organization ==
The New Mexico State Police is under the command of the Chief of the State Police. The Chief is appointed by the Cabinet Secretary of the New Mexico Department of Public Safety, with the approval of the New Mexico State Senate. The Chief is assisted by two Deputy Chiefs. The Chief and Deputy Chiefs supervise a command staff of five Police Majors who serve as the Bureau Commanders of the State Police.

The Chief serves as the Deputy Secretary of Operations for the New Mexico Department of Public Safety, the Department's third highest-ranking member.

== Rank structure ==
Title	Insignia
Police Chief	
Deputy Police Chief	
Major	
Captain	
Lieutenant	
Sergeant	
Senior Patrolman	NM SP
Patrolman	NM SP

== Headquarters ==
NMSP is headquartered with the New Mexico Department of Public Safety at 4491 Cerrillos Road in Santa Fe, NM; this location also hosts the New Mexico Law Enforcement Academy.

=== Districts ===
For operational purposes, the State Police divide New Mexico into 12 distinct Districts. Each district has a main office with a commanding officer who oversees day-to-day operations.

- District 1, Santa Fe
- District 2, Las Vegas
- District 3, Roswell
- District 4, Las Cruces
- District 5, Albuquerque
- District 6, Gallup
- District 7, Española
- District 8, Alamogordo
- District 9, Clovis
- District 10, Farmington
- District 11, Socorro
- District 12, Deming

=== Senate Bill 95 DPS Reorganization Bill ===
On July 1, 2015, the Motor Transportation Police Division (MTD) and the Special Investigation Division (SID) were merged within the State Police Division per the legislative action. Officers and Agents are now commissioned as New Mexico State Police officers and were removed from the state's employee classified system into the exempt system. The State Police is currently in the process to figure the most efficient and fiscally responsible way to implement uniform, vehicle and policy changes for all commissioned officers. As of November 2015, the decision to change all DPS vehicles and uniforms to match the current State Police identity was issued by the chief. Larger districts such as Albuquerque and Las Cruces will see cars, uniforms and badges issued out to the field first.

As of early 2017 all uniforms, badges and most vehicles (older higher mileage units being phased out) have been replaced with the traditional New Mexico State Police identity.

== Duties ==
All commissioned New Mexico State Police Officers are vested with full statewide criminal, traffic and other duties as delegated by New Mexico Statutes. The most common State Police officers that the public observe on a day-to-day basis are officers from the Uniform Bureau. NMSP has three distinct Bureaus each responsible for the overall NMSP mission but serve different capacities in the carrying out of the goals of the department. The Uniform Bureau is responsible for patrol related activities such as answering calls for service, traffic enforcement and many other field related duties.

The Investigations Bureau serves as the department's investigative body and can bring specialized resources and experience to more complex and felonious level crimes.

The Special Operations Bureau is responsible for tactical level type of resources and managing of internal processes to include Fleet and Special Projects. Many of the members of the different specialized teams are part time members that are activated for that particular type of mission. Some specialized teams such as TACT, EOD and K-9 have full time members that are assigned to the team.

Specialized Divisions/Bureaus of the New Mexico State Police include:

- Tactical Team (Special Weapons and Tactics)
- Explosive Ordnance Disposal (EOD)
- Criminal Interdiction Unit (K-9 Narcotics and EOD/Patrol Working Dogs)
- Investigations Bureau (Narcotics, Impact, Cold Case, Fugitive Apprehension Response Team)
- Crime Scene
- Pistol Team
- Drone Team
- Crash Reconstruction Unit
- Commercial Vehicle Enforcement
- Crisis Negotiation Team
- Motors Team
- Bicycle Team
- Governors Protection Detail
- NMSP Aviation Unit (Helicopter)
- DUI and Traffic Units
- Research and Development
- Internal Affairs
- Special Projects
- Community Engagement Unit
- Fleet
- Honor Guard
- Search and Recovery Team (Dive Team)
- Emergency Response Team (Riots, Public Order disturbances)
- Emergency Response Officers (Hazardous Materials)
- Homeland Security

== Fallen officers ==
Twenty-nine officers have died in the line of duty.

Officer	Date of death	Details
Walter G. Taber	September 28, 1937	Motorcycle crash
Leslie Delbert Bugg	August 21, 1946	Motorcycle crash
William T. Speight	February 24, 1949	Heart attack
Nash Phillip Garcia	April 11, 1952	Gunfire
Sgt John Carl "Jake" Ramsey	August 5, 1953	Automobile crash
Joe Taylor Aven, Jr	August 6, 1953	Automobile crash
Robert E. Lee	August 16, 1960	Automobile crash
Captain James Edward Clark	September 19, 1960	Struck by train
Bennie D. Williams	July 9, 1963	Automobile crash
Antonio Jaramillo	February 2, 1965	Struck by vehicle
Agent Robert Romero	September 30, 1967	Automobile crash
Robert Rosenbloom	November 8, 1971	Gunfire
David L. Coker	November 18, 1979	Gunfire
Richard Gomez	April 17, 1980	Gunfire
David M. Smith	August 6, 1984	Aircraft accident
Lowell D. Howard	August 6, 1984	Aircraft accident
Manuel Olivas	February 1, 1985	Vehicular assault
Sherman L. Toler, Jr	March 5, 1986	Gunfire
Wayne G. Allison	February 13, 1988	Aircraft accident
Glen Michael Huber	January 26, 1991	Gunfire
Lloyd R Aragon, Sr	August 1, 2001	Vehicular Assault
Ramon Robert Solis	October 19, 2001	Aircraft accident
Damon Talbot	October 19, 2001	Aircraft accident
James Andres Archuleta	June 4, 2006	Automobile crash
Christopher Mirabal	June 13, 2007	Motorcycle accident
Lt. Michael C. Avilucea	May 30, 2008	Automobile crash
Sgt. Andrew Francis Tingwall	June 11, 2009	Aircraft accident
Darian Rey Jarrott	February 4, 2021	Gunfire-Murder
Justin Christopher Hare	March 15, 2024	Gunfire-Murder

== See also ==
- List of law enforcement agencies in New Mexico
- New Mexico Mounted Patrol
- State police
- State patrol
- Highway patrol
