= Micaela Lara Cadena =

American politician

Member of the New Mexico House of Representatives from the 33rd district
- Incumbent
- Assumed office January 15, 2019
- Preceded by: Bill McCamley

Personal details
- Born: Mesilla, New Mexico, U.S.
- Party: Democratic
- Education: Trinity College (BA); University of New Mexico (MA)

Micaela Lara Cadena is an American politician serving as a member of the New Mexico House of Representatives from the 33rd district, which includes part of Doña Ana County.

== Early life and education ==
Cadena was born and raised in Mesilla, New Mexico. After graduating from Las Cruces High School, she earned a Bachelor of Arts in International/Global Studies from Trinity College and a Master of Arts in Community and Regional Planning from the University of New Mexico.

== Career ==
Cadena previously worked at the New Mexico Corrections Department as the Bureau Chief of Recidivism Reduction. While serving in the House, Cadena continues to work as the Research Director of Young Women United, a non-profit aimed at policy change and research. Cadena assumed office on January 15, 2019, succeeding Bill McCamley, who left the House to become the Secretary for the Department of Workforce Solutions.
