= Galisteo, New Mexico =

- CDP
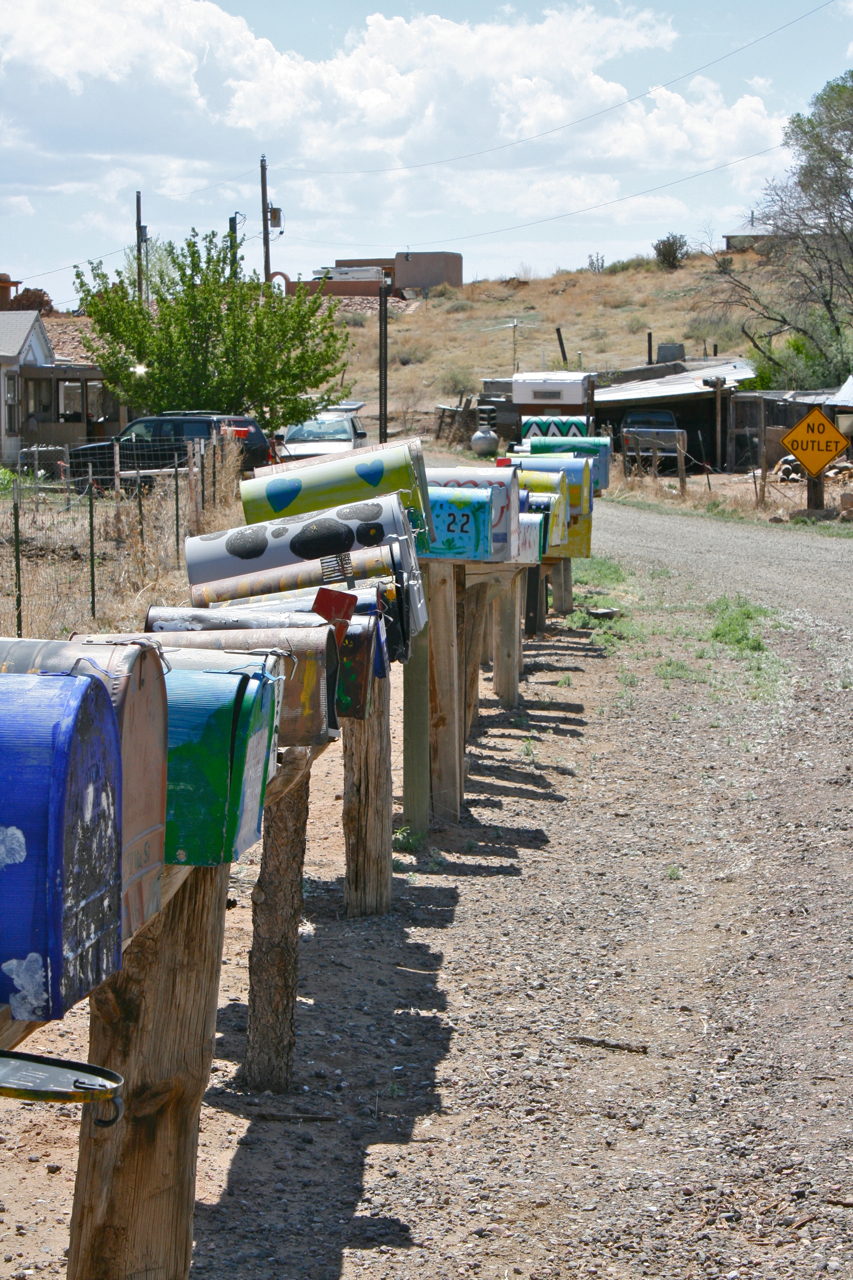
- Mailboxes in Galisteo

- Location of Galisteo, New Mexico

- Location in the United States
- Coordinates: 35°23′54″N 105°57′26″W
- Country: United States
- State: New Mexico
- County: Santa Fe

Area
  - Total: 3.37 sq mi (8.73 km^{2})
  - Land: 3.37 sq mi (8.73 km^{2})
  - Water: 0 sq mi (0.00 km^{2})
- Elevation: 6,119 ft (1,865 m)

Population (2020)
  - Total: 253
  - Density: 75.0/sq mi (28.97/km^{2})
- Time zone: UTC-7 (Mountain (MST))
  - Summer (DST): UTC-6 (MDT)
- ZIP code: 87540
- Area code: 505
- FIPS code: 35-27970
- GNIS feature ID: 2408272

Galisteo is a census-designated place (CDP) in Santa Fe County, New Mexico, United States. It is part of the Santa Fe, New Mexico Metropolitan Statistical Area. The population was 253 at the 2020 census.

== Name ==
The name refers to Galicians, perhaps via a family with ancestry from that region.

== Geography ==
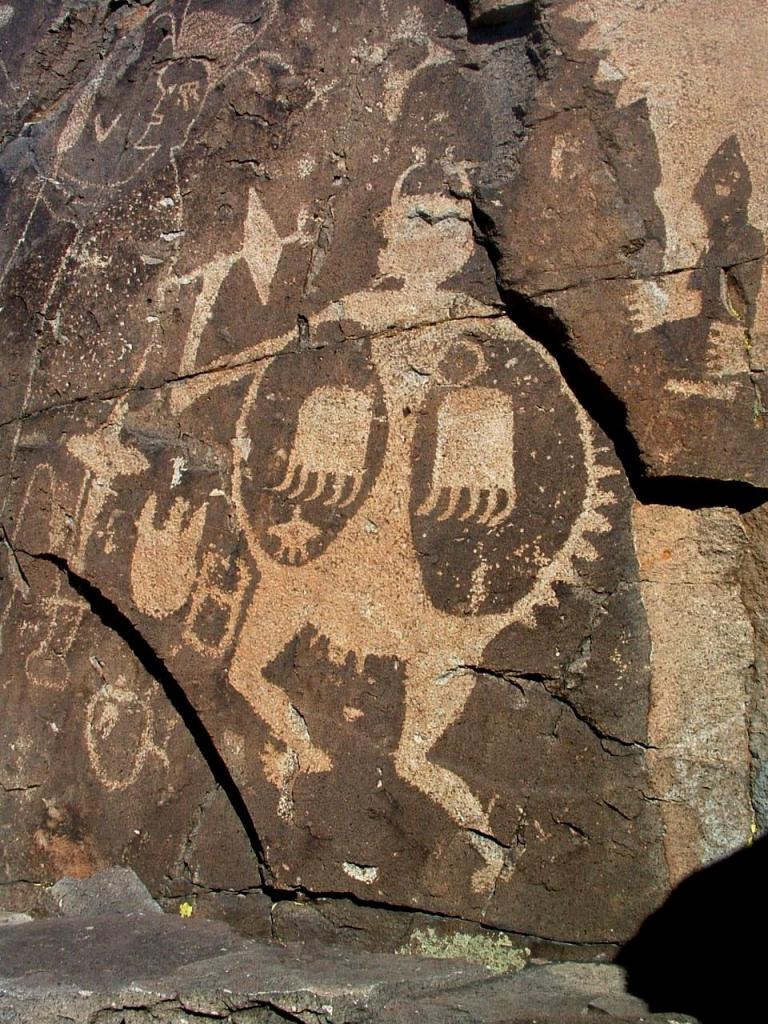
Tewa warrior with shield petroglyph at Comanche Gap, on private property south of Galisteo.

The present settlement is located along the Galisteo Creek in the Galisteo Basin. All of these are named for Galisteo Pueblo (Tewa: Thanugeh Ówîngeh Kayyee), one of several abandoned and ruined Tanoan villages in the basin, sited near the settlement.

According to the United States Census Bureau, the CDP has a total area of 2.5 square miles (6.5 km^{2}), all land.

== Demographics ==
Historical population
| Census | Pop. | Note | %± |
|---|---|---|---|
| 2020 | 253 | | — |
U.S. Decennial Census

As of the census of 2000, there were 265 people, 119 households, and 71 families residing in the CDP. The population density was 101.4 inhabitants per square mile (39.2/km^{2}). There were 136 housing units at an average density of 52.0 per square mile (20.1/km^{2}). The racial makeup of the CDP was 80.38% White, 0.38% Native American, 18.87% from other races, and 0.38% from two or more races. Hispanic or Latino of any race were 35.47% of the population.

There were 119 households, out of which 19.3% had children under the age of 18 living with them, 49.6% were married couples living together, 6.7% had a female householder with no husband present, and 40.3% were non-families. 29.4% of all households were made up of individuals, and 3.4% had someone living alone who was 65 years of age or older. The average household size was 2.23 and the average family size was 2.79.

In the CDP, the population was spread out, with 18.5% under the age of 18, 4.2% from 18 to 24, 24.5% from 25 to 44, 39.6% from 45 to 64, and 13.2% who were 65 years of age or older. The median age was 47 years. For every 100 females, there were 92.0 males. For every 100 females age 18 and over, there were 84.6 males.

The median income for a household in the CDP was $45,324, and the median income for a family was $45,735. Males had a median income of $18,625 versus $31,875 for females. The per capita income for the CDP was $27,719. None of the families and 3.6% of the population were living below the poverty line.

== Education ==
Galisteo is within Santa Fe Public Schools. It is zoned to El Dorado Community School (K-8) in El Dorado. Its high school is Santa Fe High School.

== Village Culture ==
Galisteo has served as a filming location for a number of motion pictures. Nearly all have been westerns, including The Cowboys, Silverado, The Hi-Lo Country, There Will Be Blood, Young Guns, Crazy Heart, 3:10 to Yuma and In a Valley of Violence. The town also served as backdrop for fantasy blockbusters Legion and Thor. It also appeared in the Netflix series Godless.

Site of the annual Rodeo de Galisteo, the village also hosts one of New Mexico's oldest art studio tours. La Sala, a former 19th century adobe dance hall, is now an art gallery. Galisteo is the subject of two history books, Down Country: The Tano of the Galisteo Basin and Pueblo Chico: Land and Lives in Galisteo since 1814, by Lucy Lippard.

== Notable residents ==
- Tom Ford - American fashion designer
- Woody Gwyn - American artist
- Harmony Hammond - American artist
- Nancy Holt - American artist
- Burl Ives - American folk singer and actor; recorded a song about the town
- David T. Killion - U.S. Government official and diplomat
- Lucy R. Lippard - American writer, activist, curator
- Deborah Madison - American chef and writer
- Agnes Martin - American artist
- Matthew McQueen - U.S. politician
- Bruce Nauman - American artist
- Concha Ortiz y Pino - American politician; born in Galisteo
- Bernard Pomerance - American playwright
- Susan Rothenberg - American artist
- Fritz Scholder - Native American artist
- Margaret Wrinkle - American writer and filmmaker
