= New Mexico Department of Agriculture =

Agency overview
- Formed: January 1911
- Jurisdiction: New Mexico
- Headquarters: 1050 Stewart St, Las Cruces, NM 88001, United States
- Agency executive: Jeff Witte, Director
- Website: nmdeptag.nmsu.edu

The New Mexico Department of Agriculture (Spanish: Departamento de Agricultura de Nuevo México) is a state-owned agency in New Mexico. The department is responsible for promoting New Mexico agriculture, ensuring food safety, and regulating the use of natural resources for agriculture.

The NMDA is led by a director who also serves on the New Mexico Governor's Cabinet. The current director, Jeff Witte, was appointed in May 2011.

The headquarters is on the property of New Mexico State University in University Park and has a Las Cruces post office address.

== History ==
Established in 1911 with the ratification of the New Mexico Constitution, the NMDA was originally set to be governed by the New Mexico State University's board of regents. Over the years, its scope has broadened to account for increased interest in agriculture. In 1955, numerous agricultural services were consolidated under the department, and since 1978 the NMDA director has served concurrently in the state's Cabinet.

== Divisions ==
The NMDA is organized into several divisions, each with their own subdivisions and areas of focus:

- Agricultural and Environmental Services Division
  - Entomology and Nursery Industries
  - Pesticide Compliance
  - Hemp
- Agricultural Production Services
  - Biosecurity
  - Dairy
  - Feed, Seed & Fertilizer
  - Southwest Border Food Protection and Emergency Preparedness Center
- Agricultural Programs and Resources
  - Acequia & Community Ditch Fund
  - Agricultural Workforce Development Program
  - Healthy Soil Program
  - Noxious Weed Information
  - Soil & Water Conservation Programs
- Laboratory Division
  - Metrology Lab
  - Petroleum Lab
  - Seed Lab
  - State Chemist Lab
- Marketing and Development
- Standards and Consumer Services
  - Chile Advertising
  - Egg Grading
  - Open Date Labeling for Dairy Products
  - Petroleum Standards
  - Weights & Measures
- Veterinary Diagnostic Services
