= University Park, New Mexico =

- Census-designated place
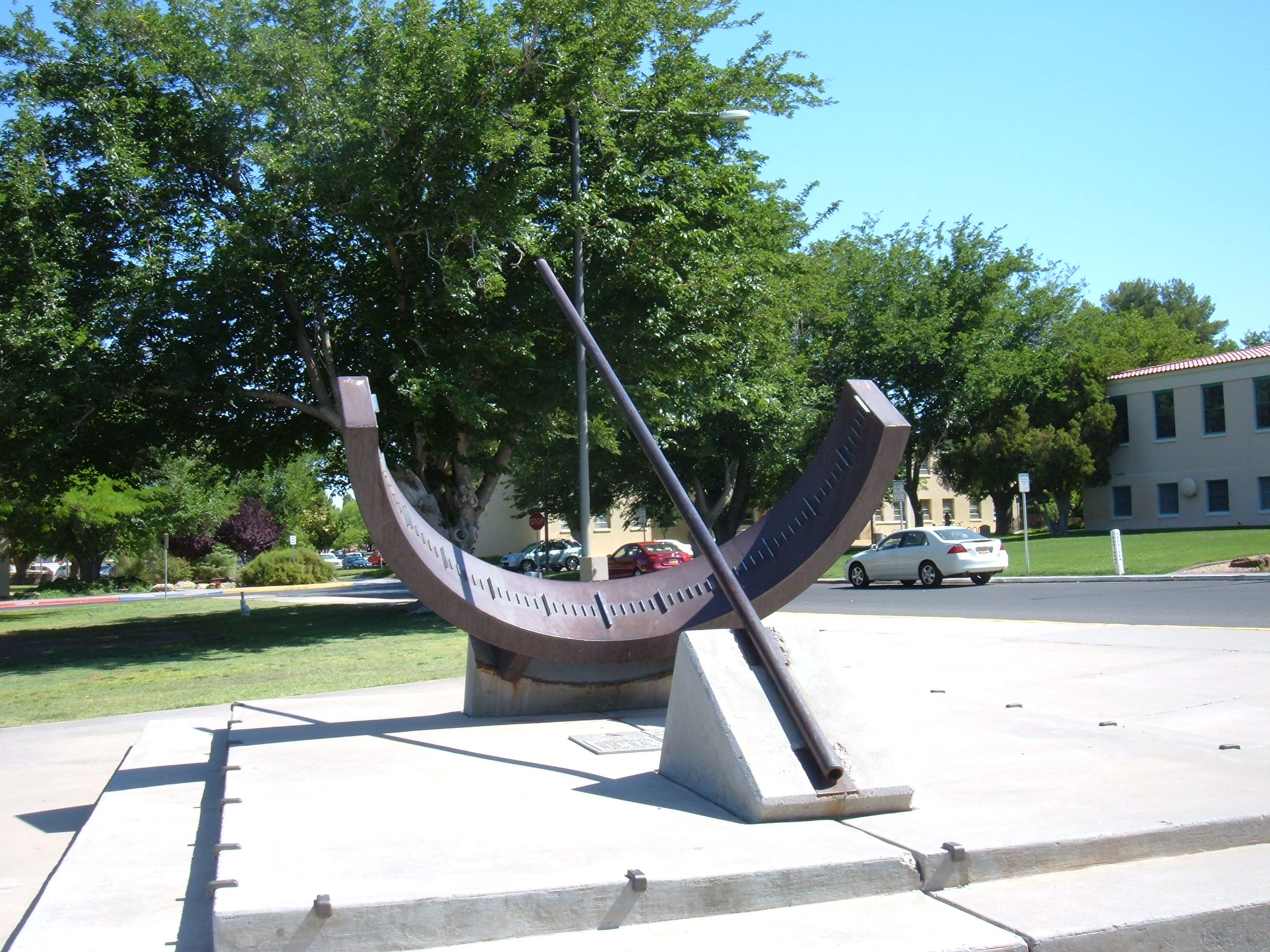
- Sundial in front of Hadley Hall

- Location of University Park, New Mexico
- Coordinates: 32°16′41″N 106°45′06″W
- Country: United States
- State: New Mexico
- County: Dona Ana

Area
  - Total: 1.53 sq mi (3.97 km^{2})
  - Land: 1.53 sq mi (3.97 km^{2})
  - Water: 0 sq mi (0.00 km^{2})
- Elevation: 3,963 ft (1,208 m)

Population (2020)
  - Total: 3,007
  - Density: 1,959.6/sq mi (756.59/km^{2})
- Time zone: UTC-7 (Mountain (MST))
  - Summer (DST): UTC-6 (MDT)
- ZIP code: 88003
- Area code: 575
- FIPS code: 35-81030
- GNIS feature ID: 2409380

University Park is a census-designated place (CDP) in Doña Ana County, New Mexico, United States. As of the 2020 census, University Park had a population of 3,007. It is part of the Las Cruces Metropolitan Statistical Area.

The CDP is almost all of the area bounded by University Avenue, Interstate 10 and Interstate 25 and is thus very nearly coextensive with the Las Cruces campus of New Mexico State University.

== Geography ==
University Park is surrounded by the city limits of Las Cruces, with the city center located to the north.

According to the United States Census Bureau, the CDP has a total area of 1.5 square miles (4.0 km^{2}), all land.

== Demographics ==
Historical population
Census	Pop.	Note	%±
2010	4,192		—
2020	3,007		−28.3%
U.S. Decennial Census

=== 2020 census ===
As of the 2020 census, University Park had a population of 3,007. The median age was 20.8 years. 6.0% of residents were under the age of 18 and 0.2% of residents were 65 years of age or older. For every 100 females there were 161.9 males, and for every 100 females age 18 and over there were 165.1 males age 18 and over.

100.0% of residents lived in urban areas, while 0.0% lived in rural areas.

There were 269 households in University Park, of which 30.9% had children under the age of 18 living in them. Of all households, 27.1% were married-couple households, 32.3% were households with a male householder and no spouse or partner present, and 35.7% were households with a female householder and no spouse or partner present. About 46.1% of all households were made up of individuals and 4.1% had someone living alone who was 65 years of age or older.

There were 742 housing units, of which 63.7% were vacant. The homeowner vacancy rate was 27.3% and the rental vacancy rate was 44.7%.

Racial composition as of the 2020 census
Race	Number	Percent
White	1,826	60.7%
Black or African American	116	3.9%
American Indian and Alaska Native	69	2.3%
Asian	119	4.0%
Native Hawaiian and Other Pacific Islander	0	0.0%
Some other race	635	21.1%
Two or more races	242	8.0%
Hispanic or Latino (of any race)	899	29.9%

=== 2000 census ===
As of the 2000 census, there were 2,732 people, 417 households, and 351 families residing in the CDP. The population density was 1,741.2 inhabitants per square mile (672.3/km^{2}). There were 615 housing units at an average density of 392.0 per square mile (151.4/km^{2}). The racial makeup of the CDP was 66.69% White, 4.98% African American, 5.60% Native American, 5.67% Asian, 0.18% Pacific Islander, 12.48% from other races, and 4.39% from two or more races. Hispanic or Latino of any race were 37.15% of the population.

There were 417 households, out of which 64.3% had children under the age of 18 living with them, 56.8% were married couples living together, 24.0% had a female householder with no husband present, and 15.8% were non-families. 12.9% of all households were made up of individuals, and none had someone living alone who was 65 years of age or older. The average household size was 2.82 and the average family size was 3.08.

In the CDP, the population was spread out, with 16.5% under the age of 18, 63.2% from 18 to 24, 17.9% from 25 to 44, 2.3% from 45 to 64, and 0.1% who were 65 years of age or older. The median age was 20 years. For every 100 females, there were 89.6 males. For every 100 females age 18 and over, there were 86.3 males.

The median income for a household in the CDP was $13,045, and the median income for a family was $13,365. Males had a median income of $16,500 versus $18,750 for females. The per capita income for the CDP was $4,152. About 56.4% of families and 53.1% of the population were below the poverty line, including 56.5% of those under age 18 and 100.0% of those age 65 or over.

=== Demographic estimates ===
In 2010, University Park had the fourth-lowest median household income of all places in the United States with a population over 1,000.

== Education ==
It is located in Las Cruces Public Schools.

New Mexico State University is in the CDP.

== Government ==
The New Mexico Department of Agriculture headquarters is on the property of the university and in University Park.
