= Woody Gwyn =

American artist

Woody Gwyn (born 1944, San Antonio, Texas) is an American artist. He studied at the Pennsylvania Academy of Fine Arts. His work is in the New Mexico Museum of Art, Albuquerque Museum, Eiteljorg Museum, and Phoenix Art Museum. He was a 2010 recipient of the New Mexico Governor's Awards for Excellence in the Arts.

He has a studio in Galisteo, New Mexico.

== Exhibitions ==
- Luther W. Brady Art Gallery, George Washington University, 2010.

== Sources ==
- Woody Gwyn, Texas Tech University Press, January 15, 1994, ISBN 978-0-89672-344-3
