= New Mexico Department of Health =

- Great Seal of the State of New Mexico

Department overview
- Jurisdiction: State of New Mexico
- Headquarters: 1190 S. St. Francis Dr. Santa Fe, NM 87502; 35.140574°N 104.701538°W
- Employees: 3,250
- Annual budget: $540 million
- Department executive: Gina DiBlassie, Secretary
- Website: nmhealth.org

The New Mexico Department of Health (NMDOH) is the state agency charged with handling all medical and health related fields within the state of New Mexico in the United States.

== History ==
In 1919, the first meeting of the State Board of Health of New Mexico was held during the administration of Governor Octaviano Ambrosio Larrazolo and the Division of Public Health Nursing was created. The Board’s budget for fiscal year 1921 was $16,700.16. From the very beginning, public health nursing with its emphasis on providing health care and health education was seen as the most effective means of lowering the state’s high infant mortality rate, improving hygiene, and preventing the spread of communicable diseases.

== Overview ==
New Mexico’s health system consists of many components across multiple organizations. All of them contribute to assessing, maintaining and improving health in New Mexico. Those components include state agencies such as NMDOH, New Mexico Environment Department, New Mexico Human Services Department, New Mexico Children, Youth, and Families Department, and Aging and Long-Term Services Department, as well as tribal entities. These state agencies worked together annually to produce the New Mexico Children’s Cabinet Report Card and Budget Report.

The New Mexico Department of Health (NMDOH) is a centralized system of health services. It is managed by a governor-appointed cabinet secretary along with two deputy cabinet secretaries. There are 33 counties and 22 sovereign tribes in New Mexico, all of which are organized into five public health regions. Governance for these regions is provided by New Mexico Department of Health. Local public health offices are not governed by local boards of health or county officials. "Public Health Regions" have staff resources in all counties to locally assess and address public health needs. Recently, Public Health regions were realigned to better correspond geographically with patterns of public health services and to promote collaboration among local resources and other state agencies.

NMDOH is the lead entity in New Mexico providing core public health functions and essential services. The NMDOH main campus is located in Santa Fe and the agency employs approximately 3,250 people in more than 60 locations around the state and administers an annual budget in excess of $540 million. The NMDOH is divided into seven divisions (Public Health, Epidemiology and Response, Scientific Laboratory, Developmental Disabilities Support, Health Improvement, Facilities Management, and Administrative Services).

In addition, there are several offices which engage in cross-departmental efforts and supports (Office of General Counsel, Public Information Office, Office of Internal Audit, and the Office of Policy and Accountability, which includes the Office of Health Equity and the Office of Border Health). The NMDOH also operates seven facilities providing behavioral health, long term care and rehabilitative services overseen by the Office of Facility Management. New Mexico also has legalized medical cannabis and the Medical Cannabis Program was created as an independent self-supporting entity in 2012.

Although the NMDOH has many duties, three divisions perform most of the core public health essential services: the Public Health, the Emergency and Response and the Scientific Laboratory Divisions. However, other offices provide coordination, oversight and enabling services that make the delivery of these services possible and ensure adherence to policy compliance, as well as to quality and performance improvement practices.
