= New Mexico Department of Public Safety =

- Great Seal of the State of New Mexico

Agency overview
- Formed: 1986
- Headquarters: 4491 Cerrillos Rd. Santa Fe, New Mexico
- Employees: 1346 FTE (FY2011)
- Annual budget: $169.6 million (FY2014)
- Agency executives: Jason Bowie, Cabinet Secretary Designate of Public Safety; Tim Johnson, Deputy Cabinet Secretary of Law Enforcement Operations & Chief of the New Mexico State Police (NMSP)
- Child agency: New Mexico State Police (NMSP)
- Website: dps.nm.gov

The New Mexico Department of Public Safety (NMDPS) is the government department for public safety and security within the New Mexico Governor's Cabinet. NMDPS is responsible for statewide law enforcement services, training, disaster and emergency response. NMDPS also provides technical communications and forensics support to the public and other law enforcement agencies. NMDPS has the duty to provide for the protection and security of the governor and lieutenant governor.

The department is led by the Secretary of Public Safety. The cabinet secretary is appointed by the governor with the approval of the New Mexico Senate, to serve at his or her pleasure.

== History ==
NMDPS was created by the enactment of the Department of Public Safety Act in 1986. The department brought together the formerly independent New Mexico State Police, the Governor's Organized Crime Commission, the Motor Transportation Division of the Taxation and Revenue Department, the enforcement division of the Department of Alcoholic Beverage Control, and the New Mexico law enforcement academy into a single unified entity.

== Overview ==
The Department of Public Safety has two main missions: Program Support Services, Law Enforcement Programs.

=== Program support ===
Program Support Services consists of the Technical Support Division, the Office of the Secretary, the Office of Legal Affairs, the Information Technology Division, and the Administrative Services Division. These divisions support the operations of the department and other law enforcement agencies across the State.

Technical Support provides forensic science services through northern and southern laboratories. The Division also provides criminal records history information, mission person's clearinghouse, sex offender registration tracking, and uniform crime reporting. The Information Technology Division operates the New Mexico Law Enforcement Telecommunications System and provides connectivity to 180 criminal justice agencies across the State.

=== Law enforcement ===
Law Enforcement Program provides statewide law enforcement services. The Program area consists of the State Police Division which includes the Investigations Bureau (SIU), the Uniform Bureau and the Motor Transportation Bureau, and the Training and Recruitment Bureau. The New Mexico State Police enforces the criminal, civil and administrative laws of the State, in particular in smaller communities, rural areas, and the highways of the State. The Training and Recruitment Division operates the state Law Enforcement Academy which provides training to all law enforcement personnel in the State.

== Organization ==
The head of NMDPS is the Cabinet Secretary of Public Safety. The cabinet secretary is appointed by the governor of New Mexico, with the approval of the New Mexico Senate, and serves as a member of the Governor's Cabinet.

The cabinet secretary is assisted by a deputy secretary and seven division directors. Each of the division directors is appointed by the cabinet secretary with the approval of the governor. The sole exception is the Chief of the State Police, who is appointed by the cabinet secretary with the approval of the State Senate. The state police chief also serves as the DPS Deputy Secretary for Operations, the department's third highest-ranking official behind the cabinet secretary and deputy secretary.

NMDPS is composed of eight divisions:

- State Police Division
- Motor Transportation Police Division (merged on July 1, 2015, with State Police as the Motor Transportation Bureau.)
- Special Investigations Division (merged on July 1, 2015, with State Police as the Special Investigations Unit within the Investigations Bureau.)
- Training and Recruitment Division
- Communications Division
- Technical Support Division
- Administrative Services
- Information Technology Division

Overseen by NMDPS

- New Mexico Mounted Patrol
- New Mexico Search and Rescue
- Civilian volunteers

== Budget and Personnel ==
Division	Number of Employees	Budget (in millions)
Program Support Administrative Services Division Technical Support Division Information Technology Division Office of the Secretary Office of Legal Affairs	209	$23.9
Law Enforcement State Police Division Special Investigations Division Training and Recruitment Division	860	$79.3
Motor Transportation Police Division	277	$23.3
TOTAL	1346	$126.6

== See also ==
- Department of Public Safety
