= New Mexico Office of the State Engineer =

Agency overview
- Headquarters: 130 S Capitol Pl. Santa Fe, New Mexico 87501
- Agency executive: Elizabeth Anderson, State Engineer
- Website: https://ose.state.nm.us

The New Mexico Office of the State Engineer is a state agency in New Mexico, located in the Concha Ortiz y Pino Building in Santa Fe. The agency is responsible for managing New Mexico water resources, including the supervision, measurement, appropriation, and distribution of surface and groundwater. The State Engineer, appointed by the Governor of New Mexico, serves as the agency's director, who concurrently acts as secretary of the New Mexico Interstate Stream Commission.
