= Concha Ortiz y Pino =

American politician

Member of the New Mexico House of Representatives
- In office 1936–1941

Personal details
- Born: Maria Concepcion Ortiz y Pino; May 23, 1910 Galisteo, New Mexico, U.S.
- Died: September 30, 2006 (aged 96) Santa Fe, New Mexico, U.S.
- Party: Democratic
- Spouse: Victor Kleven
- Education: University of New Mexico

Maria Concepcion "Concha" Ortiz y Pino de Kleven (May 23, 1910 – September 30, 2006) was an American politician from New Mexico. In 1936, she became the sixth generation of her family to serve in the New Mexico legislature. Her father, Jose Ortiz y Pino, spent 10 years in the state House of Representatives. In 1941, at age 30, she became Democratic majority whip, the first woman to hold such a position in state government. President Kennedy appointed her to the National Council of Upward Bound. Ortiz y Pino founded the state's first educational program dedicated to traditional Hispano crafts, the Colonial Hispanic Crafts School, in Galisteo in 1929. She advocated for bilingual education, disabled and women's rights.

In 2004, Governor Bill Richardson named the building for the Office of the State Engineer after her.

== Early life and education ==
Born May 23, 1910, to Jose Ortiz y Pino and Paula Ortiz an elite land-owning family in Galisteo, New Mexico. She graduated from Loretto Academy in 1928.

After taking college classes at the University of New Mexico, she received her bachelor's degree in 1942 as the first degreed recipient in Inter-American Affairs.

== Career ==
At the age of 26, Ortiz y Pino Kleven became the sixth generation of her family to serve in the New Mexico Legislature, the youngest American woman elected to state office, and the third Hispanic woman legislator in the United States. In her first term she earned the respect of her colleagues with her determination, leadership and intelligence as she was assigned to five committees; corporations and banks, educational intuitions, judiciary, livestock and roads.

The Great Depression allowed for Kleven to be known and voiced her concerns of allowing child labor to be a constitutional proposition, voted against the state regulation of hours of working women, and called out the hypocrisy of how the relief agencies did not provide enough recourses for the women during the Great Depression. Her work as a state legislator she did help push for a civil service system that would help women be protected from sexual misconduct. Kleven's notable work was when she pushed for a bill to allow women to be able to serve as juries in the court room, though she wasn't there when the bill was passed she did introduce the bill. Kleven most notable work as a state legislator which she introduced a bill in New Mexico that would allow schools to teach the Spanish language as a requirement.

== Early work ==
In her early life when Concha family moved into New Mexico, her father, Jose, was greatly involved in politics of New Mexico. Her father at the age of 10 would have Concho with her at the court house which exposed her to politics. At age eighteen she was able to organize a local villager at Galisteo into a vocational school for the promotion of traditional Hispanic craft, such as blankets, leather goods, and furniture.

After her upbringing of politics by her family she was quick to take on a state and federal political position. The Great Depression allowed for Kleven to be known and voiced her concerns of allowing child labor to be a constitutional proposition, voted against the state regulation of hours of working women, and called out the hypocrisy of how the relief agencies did not provide enough resources for women during the Great Depression. Her work as a state legislator she did help push for a civil service system that would help women be protected from sexual misconduct. Kleven most notable work as a state legislator which she introduced a bill in New Mexico that would allow schools to teach the Spanish language as a requirement.

=== Presidential appointments ===
John F. Kennedy appointed her to the Nation Council of Upward Bound, which provides high school students access to mentors, after-school tutoring, academic advising and opportunities for career and leadership development. Lyndon B. Johnson later asked her to serve on the national commission on Architectural Barriers, which created the 1968 standards issued under the Americans with Disabilities Act. Similar standards apply to building and sites funded by the Federal government under Architectural Barriers Act of 1968. She also served on the National Humanities Council as an appointee of Gerald Ford. After leaving politics, she served on several community boards until her death on September 30, 2006.

== Personal life ==
In 1943, she married Victor Kleven, her former professor. They operated a family ranch for several years in Agua Verde until 1956 when her husband died. She died in Santa Fe, New Mexico on September 30, 2006.
