= New Mexico Department of Information Technology =

The New Mexico Department of Information Technology (DOIT) is a state government organization which oversees many of the state of New Mexico's technical assets and infrastructure in state government.

NM DoIT was created in 2007 to provide state government a strong technical foundation to serve citizens and to create accountability and efficiency in the information technology arena.

The Department is organized into three program areas: Enterprise Services, Compliance and Project Management and Program Support. The Department's central office and the State Data Center are located in the John F. Simms Jr. Building in Santa Fe. Additional administrative and technical support offices are located in Santa Fe, Albuquerque, Las Vegas, Las Cruces and Roswell.
