= New Mexico Office of African American Affairs =

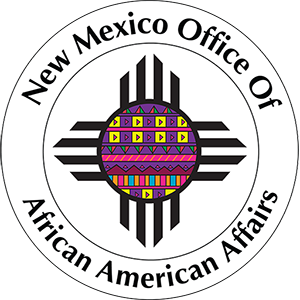

Agency overview
- Headquarters: 310 San Pedro Drive Northeast, Suite 230 Albuquerque, New Mexico 87108
- Motto: Crescit eundo it grows as it goes
- Agency executive: Gene Grant, Executive
- Website: oaaa.state.nm.us

The New Mexico Office of African American Affairs (OAAA) is a state agency in New Mexico tasked with advising education, community and economic development, and healthcare for African Americans in New Mexico. The office was established in 1999 by the New Mexico Legislature through House Bill 909. Then-Governor Gary Johnson later created an executive advisory committee through executive order.

== Leadership ==
The agency is managed by the Director of the Office of African American Affairs, a position appointed by the Governor of New Mexico. Sylvester ‘Butch’ Brown was the first Director. In 2002, Bill Richardson appointed Alice Faye Kent Hoppes as Director, a position she held in 2004 when she died in office. Harold Bailey was her replacement, also appointed by Richardson. In February 2012, Susana Martinez appointed Yvette Kaufman-Bell as Director.

In June 2020, Director William Scott Carreathers resigned from his position. According to Sheryl Williams Stapleton, this was due to a miscommunication between Carreathers and the governor who appointed him the previous year, Michelle Lujan Grisham, regarding Lujan Grisham's announcement of a 'Council for Racial Justice' in response to issues raised by the George Floyd protests.

After Carreathers' resignation, Amy Whitfield was appointed (she previously headed the New Mexico Black Leadership Council). Then Whitfield took another role elsewhere in state government and Charles Reado became the acting executive director. Reado is now the deputy director: As of October 2025 Gene Grant is the newest appointed director.
