= New Mexico Children, Youth, and Families Department =

State government organization in Santa Fe, US

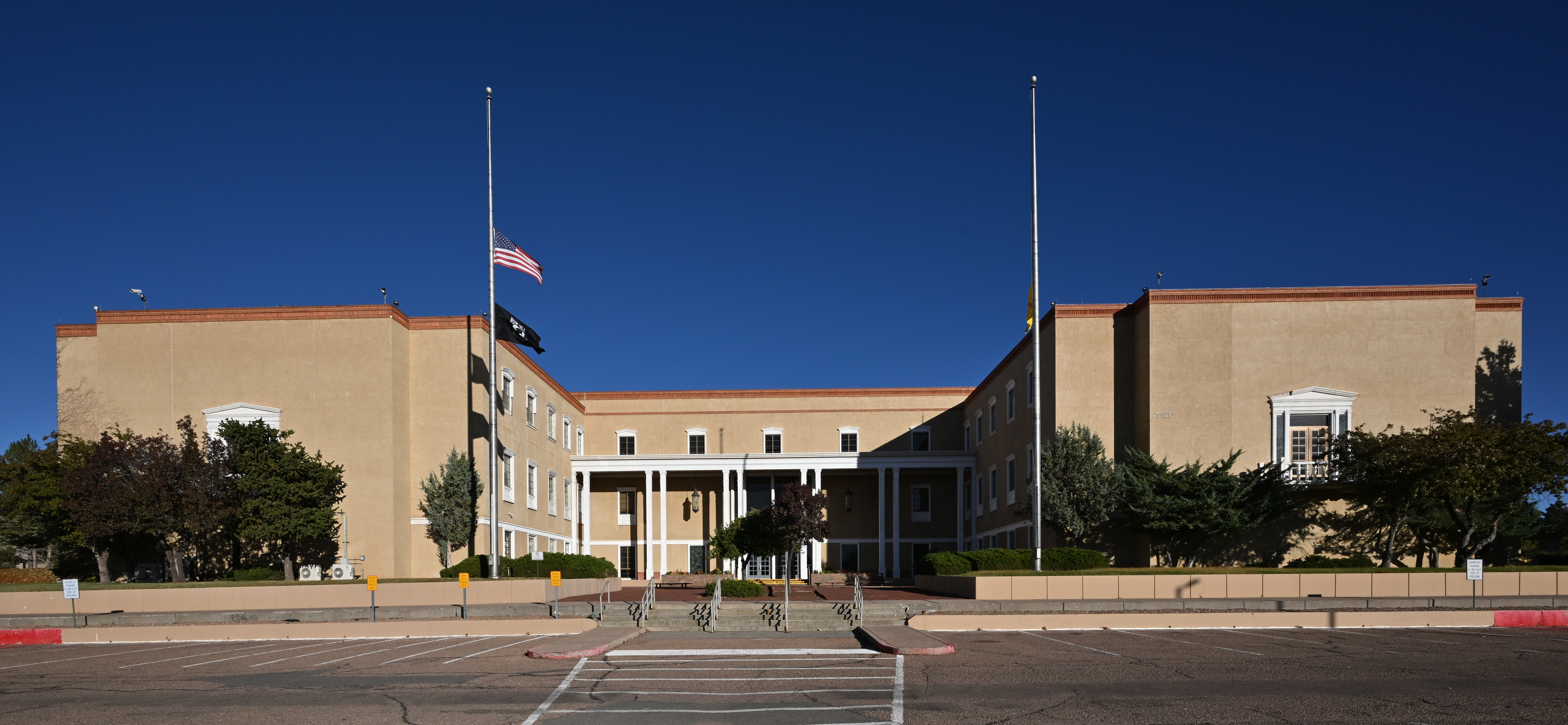
- The PERA Building has the department's headquarters

Agency overview
- Jurisdiction: New Mexico
- Website: cyfd.nm.gov

The New Mexico Children, Youth, and Families Department is a state agency of New Mexico, headquartered in the PERA Building in Santa Fe. It is the state agency responsible for child protective services and juvenile justice services. It was created as a cabinet department by statute in 1992 under Ch. 9, art. 2A NMSA 1978.

== Leadership ==
The department is led by a secretary, appointed by the Governor of New Mexico and subject to confirmation by the New Mexico Senate. The secretary is also a member of the New Mexico Governor's Cabinet. Cabinet secretaries in the administration of Michelle Lujan Grisham have include Brian Blalock, Barbara Vigil, and current Secretary Teresa Casados.

== Facilities ==
Juvenile Justice Services/Facilities (JJS) is the division that operates juvenile correctional facilities.

Facilities include:

- Area 1
- Albuquerque Boys Center
- Albuquerque Girls Reintegration Center
- Camino Nuevo Youth Center (houses female inmates)
- Carlsbad Community Reintegration Center
- Eagle Nest Reintegration Center
- J. Paul Taylor Center
- YDDC (NMGS)

The former New Mexico Boys School opened on October 1, 1909. CYFD closed it in 2005 and was transferred to the New Mexico Corrections Department, now serving as the Springer Correctional Facility.
