= New Mexico Department of Workforce Solutions =

Agency overview
- Headquarters: 401 Broadway Blvd NE, Albuquerque, New Mexico 87102
- Agency executive: vacant, Secretary
- Website: dws.state.nm.us

The New Mexico Department of Workforce Solutions (DWS) is a state government agency in the state of New Mexico. The agency is responsible for economic development, education initiatives, labor relations, unemployment, workforce technology, volunteerism, and workforce development.

== Structure ==
The agency is managed by a cabinet secretary appointed by the Governor of New Mexico. The most recent Secretary of the Department of Workforce Solutions was Bill McCamley, a former member of the New Mexico House of Representatives, served as Secretary from January, 2019 to April, 2021.
