= New Mexico Mounted Patrol =

Law enforcement agency in New Mexico

- Shoulder patch of the New Mexico Mounted Patrol

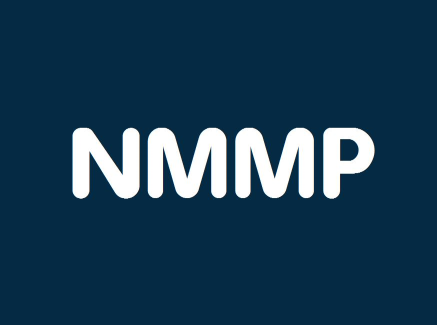
- NMMP Logo

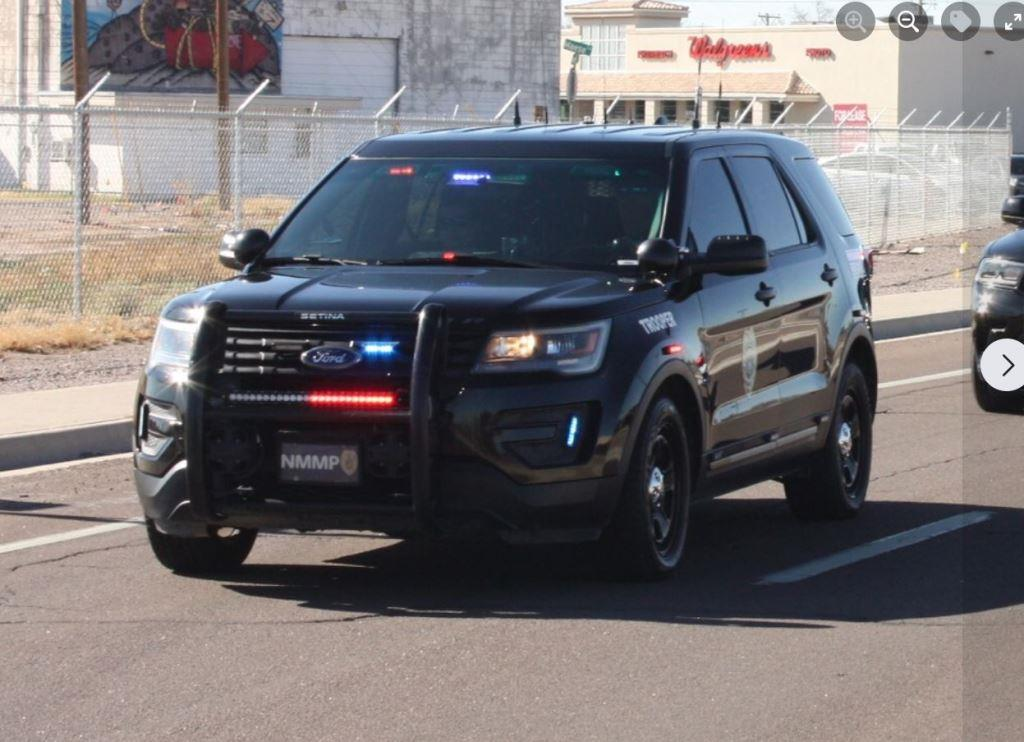
- New Mexico Mounted Patrol Unit
- Abbreviation: NMMP

Agency overview
- Formed: April 16, 1941
- Preceding agencies: New Mexico Mounted Patrol (Territorial); New Mexico Mounted Patrol (unofficial; 1937–1941)
- Volunteers: 98
- Annual budget: Unfunded

Jurisdictional structure
- Operations jurisdiction: New Mexico, United States
- Area: 121,665 square miles (315,110 km^{2})
- Population: 1,969,915 (2007 est.)
- Legal jurisdiction: New Mexico when working under the authority of any state law enforcement or regulatory agency.

Operational structure
- Headquarters: Roswell, NM
- Agency executive: Jason Holloway

Website
- NMMP Website

The New Mexico Mounted Patrol is an all-volunteer state law enforcement agency. Mounted Patrol Troopers complete an intensive night/weekend academy and must meet the same strict requirements as any peace officer in New Mexico. State statutes dictate that the governor may call the Mounted Patrol to duty in case of emergency. Unless called out by the governor, troopers assist state, county and municipal law enforcement agencies and assume the same authority as peace officers in that agency.

== History ==
In New Mexico Territory, the Mounted Patrol was the only form of non-federal law enforcement. As police needs increased, the Mounted Patrol was renamed the New Mexico Mounted Police in 1905 and became the state's first law enforcement agency when New Mexico achieved statehood in 1912.

Criminal elements of the state government repeatedly attempted to get rid of the Mounted Police and even succeeded in defunding the agency from 1913 to 1917. The Mounted Police gained a reputation as a very effective law enforcement agency following the attack on Columbus, New Mexico by Pancho Villa and his men. Criminal elements in the legislature again focused on abolishing the agency and finally succeeded on February 15, 1921.

In 1933 the state created the New Mexico Motor Patrol, which became the New Mexico State Police in 1935.

A group of citizens realized that the newly formed State Police was poorly equipped and often outnumbered, and decided to resurrect the Mounted Patrol as a volunteer organization in 1937. The organization grew in the following years and Governor John Miles took an interest in the organization. He pushed to make the Mounted Patrol an official state law enforcement agency and on April 16, 1941 the organization in its present form was created.

== Organization ==
Headquarters: Mounted Patrol Board - The internal control, management, supervision and power of the organization is vested in a board of directors composed of not less than one member from each troop of the NMMP elected by the members of the organization.

The chief of the mounted patrol is elected by the members of the NMMP, with the deputy chiefs appointed by the board of directors and the district captains and state staff appointed by the chief.

North Zone

- Northwest District - Metro - Albuquerque / Rio Rancho / Moriarty / Española / Grants / Gallup
- Northeast District - Las Vegas, Raton, Roy, Santa Fe

South Zone

- Southeast District - Clovis, Lovington, Roswell, Artesia
- Southwest District - Las Cruces, Truth or Consequences, Silver City, Alamogordo, Deming.

== See also ==
- List of law enforcement agencies in New Mexico
- Colorado Rangers
- Arizona Rangers
