= New Mexico Environment Department =

New Mexico state government agency

Department overview
- Headquarters: Santa Fe, New Mexico
- Employees: 650
- Department executives: James Kenney, Cabinet Secretary Designate; Jennifer Prewitt, Deputy Cabinet Secretary Marlena Cordoba, ASD Director/Chief Financial Officer
- Website: www.env.nm.gov

The New Mexico Environment Department (NMED) is a state government agency responsible for "protecting and restoring the environment of the state of New Mexico to foster a healthy and prosperous New Mexico for present and future generations," according to its mission statement. This organization believes that New Mexicans must have fair treatment and meaningful opportunities for involvement in the development, implementation and enforcement in several laws. These include but are not limited to environmental laws and regulations regardless of race, creed, color, national origin, gender, disability, religious or political affiliation, income or educational level. This department is also commitment to equity in the communities they serve guided by the non-discrimination and environmental justice programs. It was established in the Department of the Environment Act (40th Legislature), enacted July 1, 1991, and is a cabinet-level department to oversee the state's environmental laws. Before its creation, these environmental duties were shared by the New Mexico Health Department’s Environmental Protection Division and other government agencies. The department has around 650 employees, and covers such areas as environmental health and protection, air quality, occupational health and safety, radiation control, water management and petroleum storage tank management. New Mexico is committed to the protection of public health.

== History ==
Upon the creation of the Department, during Bruce King’s administration (1991–1995), Judith Espinosa (1991–1994) was selected as Cabinet Secretary and Ron Curry as Deputy Cabinet Secretary.

During Governor Gary Johnson’s two terms (1995–2003), NMED had three Cabinet Secretaries. Mark E. Weidler (1995–1998) was the first. His Deputy Cabinet Secretary was Edgar T. Thornton, III. Weidler died in a car accident on July 18, 1998. Johnson's choice to replace Weidler was Peter Maggiore (1998–2002), the Director of the Environmental Protection Division. Maggiore chose Paul Ritzma as his Deputy Secretary. Towards the end of the Johnson administration, Maggiore left the department, whereupon John D’Antonio (2002) was selected to carry out the responsibilities of Cabinet Secretary for the remaining six months of the Johnson administration.

During the administration of Bill Richardson (2003–2011), the Cabinet Secretary was Ron Curry (2003–2010). Curry had three separate Deputy Secretaries. The first was Derrith Watchman-Moore, who moved on to be Cabinet Secretary for the Department of Indian Affairs. Cindy Padilla, a Division Director at NMED, was chosen to replace Watchman-Moore. Padilla served until she was appointed by the administration to Cabinet Secretary for the newly created Aging and Long Term Services Department. When this happened, Division Director Jon Goldstein became Deputy Secretary. Goldstein was thereafter appointed Cabinet Secretary of the Energy, Minerals and Natural Resources Department. Upon his departure from the NMED, Sarah Cottrell was chosen as Deputy Cabinet Secretary.

Under the administration of Susana Martinez (2011–present), F. David Martin is the Cabinet Secretary. At the onset of the administration, the Deputy Cabinet Secretary was Dhiraj Solomon. Solomon left NMED and was replaced by Butch Tongate, a staff member since 1993.

F. David Martin left the agency in 2012 to become the Cabinet Secretary for the Energy, Minerals & Natural Resources Department. He was replaced with Ryan Flynn the General Counsel for the agency. in 2015 Flynn left the agency and was replaced by Butch Tongate.

=== COVID-19 ===
In January 2022, The New Mexico Environment Department updated COVID-19 rules in the workplace after an overturn by the US Supreme court ruling. The agency urged encouraging businesses to implement their own vaccinations and testing program. In March 2022, New Mexico Environment Department was announced to receive modest bumps to their budgets from the state's general fund. The agency has 550 employees throughout our main offices in Santa Fe and 22 district offices state-wide.

== Organization ==
Offices and divisions reporting to the Deputy Secretary in 2012 included Administrative Services, Information Technology, Public Information, Resource Protection, Field Operations and Infrastructure and Environmental Protection.

- Administrative services included bureaus for human resources and financial services.
- Resources Protection included bureaus for groundwater quality, surface water quality, DOE oversight, petroleum storage tank and hazardous waste.
- Field Operations and Infrastructure included bureaus for construction programs, drinking water, environmental health and mining the tribal liaison.
- Environmental Protection included bureaus for air quality, occupational health and safety, solid waste and radiation control.
- The organization utilizes inventive engineering and technology-based approaches to tackle environmental difficulties.

=== Petroleum Storage Tank Bureau ===
The Petroleum Storage Tank Bureau (PSTB) of the New Mexico Environment Department has the mandate of reducing, mitigating and eliminating threats to the environment posed by the release of petroleum products from storage tanks. Groundwater in parts of New Mexico, such as the Albuquerque Basin, may lie in thin aquifers that are very close to the surface and therefore very susceptible to contamination.

Petroleum leaks are not infrequent. Of the three hundred storage tanks in the Española Basin, including tanks no longer in service, 137 releases were reported from the early 1990s until 2007, of which 96 had been closed. The PSTB has a Corrective Action Fund that may be used to clean up tank leaks and protect groundwater.

In July 2012, it was reported that the remediation system at the Arroyo Honda petroleum storage tank outside Santa Fe, New Mexico was being upgraded under review of the PSTB, funded by the Corrective Action Fund. The site had a history of problems dating back to the 1960s, and wells for domestic water supply down gradient from the site had been contaminated.

In January 2007, the petroleum storage tank bureau reported that there were sixty government-owned or -operated facilities with a total of 126 underground storage tanks. All of these had been inspected in the last three years, and there were no records of non-compliance with the guidelines.

Starting in 2010 for larger storage tank owners, and by 2012 for all owners, the PSTB required that all petroleum storage tank operators had to have received approved training.

In March 2012, the New Mexico Environment Department announced that they were going to implement stricter rules for storage of petroleum fuel in an effort to prevent leaks that could contaminate groundwater. If a storage facility is found to have problems, and does not correct them in a timely manner, the tank would be red-tagged and further fuel deliveries prohibited. The new rules eliminated the exemption for emergency generator tanks.

=== Solid Waste Bureau ===
The Solid Waste Bureau promotes solid waste management practices. These methods improve New Mexico's environment as well as its public health.
