= New Mexico Association of Student Councils =

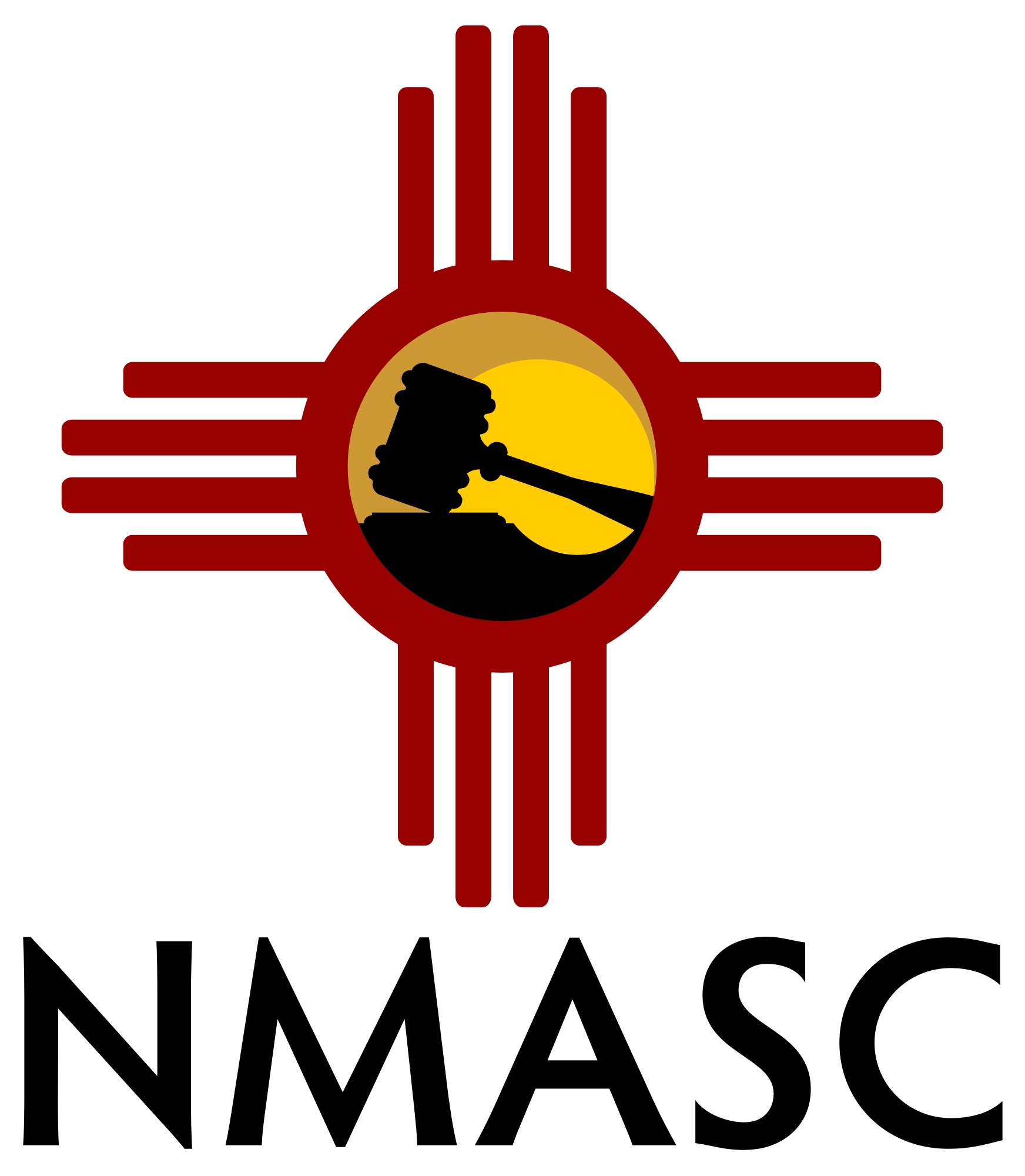
- Abbreviation: NMASC
- Founded: 1950
- Legal status: 501c(4)
- Purpose: Student Legislative
- Location: Albuquerque
- Region served: State of New Mexico
- Members: middle level, junior high, mid-high and senior high schools in the public, private, and parochial schools of New Mexico
- Governing Body: NMASC Executive Board
- Parent organization: New Mexico Association of Secondary Principals; New Mexico Activities Association
- Affiliations: National Association of Student Councils
- Website: NMASC Online

New Mexico Association of Student Councils (NMASC) is a student leadership organization in the state of New Mexico. It offers leadership training experiences, resources and networking opportunities for students and advisers all across the Land of Enchantment. The NMASC is sponsored by the New Mexico Association of Secondary School Principals as well as the New Mexico Activities Association.

== General information ==
The New Mexico Association of Student Councils is composed of five districts across the state of New Mexico. The five districts are Central District; Northeast District; Northwest District; Southeast District; and Southwest District. The NMASC sponsors a variety of activities that are available to all member schools. Activities include an annual conference held at a chosen member school, summer workshops that are held at the New Mexico Tech, fall district workshops, and additional activities.

== Executive Board ==
The NMASC's governing body is composed of an executive board consisting of an Executive Director (Mary Hahn), an Advisor to the President (Joshua Blondin), an Advisor to the 1st Vice-President (Matthew Paine), an Advisor to the 2nd Vice-President (Leslie Coe), and an Advisor to the Secretary (Christopher Salas), as well as four state officers.

- There is an appointed Executive Director who is hired by the New Mexico Association of Secondary Principals with recommendation from the NMASC Executive Board
- State officers are student leaders elected by member schools to serve as the NMASC's State President (Ilynne Gutierrez - Volcano Vista High School), 1st Vice President (Gauge Perez - Del Norte High School), 2nd Vice President (Trey Hill - Volcano Vista High School), and Secretary (Karli Horner - Artesia High School). All state officers serve for a term of one year beginning with their installation at the State Conference.

== State Conference ==
The NMASC State Conference is held each February at a selected member school. Each year, member schools send delegates to the conference to enhance their leadership skills, hear motivational speakers and network with other student leaders from throughout the state.

=== State conference locations and themes ===
State Conference Host Schools
School	Year	City	Theme
Rio Rancho High School	2027	Rio Rancho	"Bet on Leadership: Welcome to the Fabulous Rio Rancho”
Los Lunas High School	2026	Los Lunas	“Groove Into Leadership: The Spirit of ’76”
Cibola High School	2025	Albuquerque	“The Leadership Force Awakens”
Rio Grande High School	2024	Albuquerque	“Familia Leadership Fiesta”
Volcano Vista High School	2023	Albuquerque	“Let Your Leadership Soar”
Highland High School	2022	Albuquerque	“Leadership Story”
Mayfield High School	2021	Las Cruces	“Voyage to Leadership – Strive to Serve”
Eldorado High School	2020	Albuquerque	“Leadership True: Excellence, Honor, Spirit”
Farmington High School	2019	Farmington	“Explore Your Leadership: Serve. Guide. Lead.”
Bernalillo High School	2018	Bernalillo	“AMPlify Your Leadership: Born to Rock It”
Centennial High School	2017	Las Cruces	"Lights, Camera, Leadership!"
Los Alamos High School	2016	Los Alamos	""Radioactive Leaders: Take Charge! Be Positive!"
Cibola High School	2015	Albuquerque	"A Leader's Journey to Rome!"
Española Valley High School	2014	Española	"All Aboard to the Valley of Leadership!"
Atrisco Heritage Academy	2013	Albuquerque	"Oceans of Leaders, Waves of Success"
West Mesa High School	2012	Albuquerque	"Leadership Through the Decades: A Centennial Celebration"
Taos High School	2011	Taos	"Discover Courage, Knowledge, and Heart in the Land of Leadership."
Albuquerque High School	2010	Albuquerque	"Passport to Leadership"
Rio Rancho High School	2009	Rio Rancho	"The Wonderful World of Leadership."
Manzano High School	2008	Albuquerque	"Leaders of the Pack."
Taos High School	2007	Taos	"¡Qué Viva Leadership! Spice Up The Fiesta!"
Santa Rosa High School	2006	Santa Rosa	"Roll Out the Leadership Carpet."
La Cueva High School	2005	Albuquerque	"All Aboard the Leader-Ship."
Hobbs High School	2004	Hobbs	"Unmask the Leader in You"
Raton High School	2003	Raton	"Surf the Waves of Life...Create Your Own Paradise"
Rio Rancho High School	2002	Rio Rancho	"At the Heart of Leadership... Lead a Life to Lead Others"
Farmington High School	2001	Farmington	"Rise to the Challenge"
Eldorado High School	2000	Albuquerque	"Oh, The Dreams You Can Dream"
Alamogordo High School	1999	Alamogordo	
Gallup High School	1998	Gallup	
Sandia High School	1997	Albuquerque	
Lordsburg High School	1996	Lordsburg	
Oñate High School	1995	Las Cruces	
Deming High School	1990	Deming	

== Summer Leadership Workshop ==
Summer Workshop Host Locations
Location	Years Held There
NM Institute of Mining and Technology	2012 – present
Univ. of New Mexico Main Campus	1956 – 2011

Each Summer, the NMASC hosts a Summer Leadership Workshop that occurs usually the last week in July at the UNM Campus in Albuquerque. Attendees here, learn the values of leadership, responsibility, and effective roles of being great leaders in their schools. Since 2012, the annual Summer Leadership Workshop has been held at New Mexico Tech in Socorro.
