= West Mesa =

Elevated landmass lying west of the Rio Grande, New Mexico, US

Coordinates: 35°07′00″N 106°48′00″W

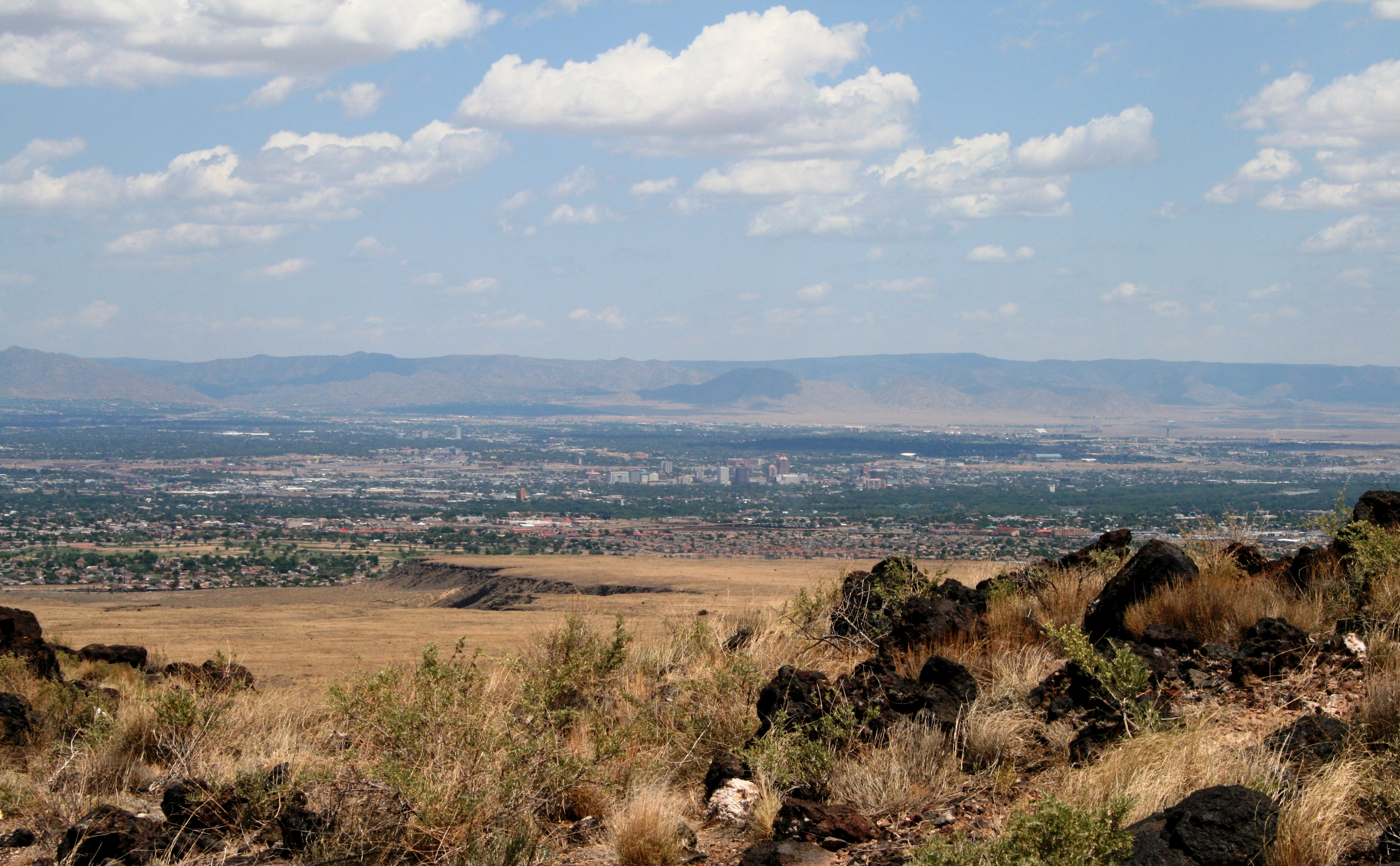
View of downtown Albuquerque and the Manzano Mountains from the West Mesa

The West Mesa (New Mexican Spanish: Atrisco) is an elevated landmass lying west of the Rio Grande, and the westside of Albuquerque, stretching from the South Valley northward to Bernalillo and Rio Rancho in the U.S. state of New Mexico.

The eastern edge of the West Mesa is defined by an escarpment that borders the Rio Grande floodplain. The West Mesa also serves as the easternmost extent of the Colorado Plateau in this region. The western edge of the mesa is the Rio Puerco near the Laguna Pueblo about 20 miles (32 km) west of Albuquerque. A large portion of the West Mesa is part of Petroglyph National Monument. It is bisected by Interstate 40 and Historic Route 66. Atrisco Vista (previously named Paseo del Volcan) (NM 347) runs north-south on the West Mesa, connecting I-40/US-66 to Double Eagle II Airport.

There are numerous subdivisions with new homes being built on the lower portion of the West Mesa as the City of Albuquerque continues to expand further to the west. Further west on the mesa are the mobile home communities of Pajarito, located to the south of I-40, and Lost Horizon, located about 1/2 mile north of I-40 and 3 miles west of the Paseo del Volcan interchange.

The Bernalillo County Correctional Facility, Cerro Colorado Landfill, and the Sandia Motor Speedway are located on the West Mesa, several miles south of Interstate 40. The National Weather Service operates a WSR-88D NEXRAD radar site on the West Mesa near Double Eagle II Airport.

== Geography ==
The West Mesa of Albuquerque is a broad, expansive region situated west of the Rio Grande River, where there is acequia-fed farmland and ranches, rising from the river's floodplain toward the edge of the volcanic escarpment of mesas and arroyos that forms the Mesa itself. This region offers commanding views of the Sandia Mountains to the east, the Jemez Mountains to the north, and the Manzano Mountains to the south, creating a dramatic backdrop for the city.

The westside of the Rio Grande features numerous riverside trails, and acequias for farms and ranches. This river area is the location of a New Mexico Department of Game and Fish local governance office, near Paseo del Norte and the Coors Bosque Trail. More westward, the region is also home to the Volcanoes—a collection of volcanic cones and lava flows that formed from ancient eruptions, which further distinguish the area. From the valley bottom these volcanos are the highest points visible on the westside of the valley in Albuquerque, and they top out at 6,033 feet (1,839 m) on Vulcan Volcano. These volcanic features are most notable at Petroglyph National Monument, which stretches across the mesa and is a key cultural and historical site. One of the high points of the West Mesa is "la ceja" at about 6,700 feet (2,042 m) in the far northwest corner of the metro near a shooting club. The region is divided by numerous arroyos, providing natural boundaries for neighborhoods and creating a distinctive grid of developments. This area has experienced rapid urban growth, especially in recent decades, transforming from open spaces to suburban neighborhoods, shopping centers, and parks.

== History ==
The West Mesa was home to Tiwa Pueblo peoples, who lived in pueblos near the Rio Grande. The area was known for its agricultural potential, taking advantage of the river's water. In 1540, the famed Spanish explorer Francisco Vásquez de Coronado passed through the region while seeking the fabled Seven Cities of Gold. However, the Spanish did not establish permanent settlements here immediately, though they did introduce livestock and crops to the area.

In the 1690s, as part of Santa Fe de Nuevo México during the Atrisco Land Grant. This grant covered a vast area in what is now west Albuquerque. The grant was an important piece of land for farming and livestock grazing. For centuries, the Atrisco Land Grant was passed down to local Puebloan and Hispano families, and the region became a mix of ranching and farming. This area would retain its connection to the Atrisco Land Grant, even as it grew into the modern urbanized neighborhoods we see today. Though this heritage was initially disturbed after the Mexican-American War and the signing of the Treaty of Guadalupe Hidalgo in 1848. The land rights of the Atrisco Land Grant were challenged, and legal disputes over the ownership of the land continued for many years. The U.S. recognized the Atrisco Land Grant as legal precedent, which set the stage for the rapid expansion and development of Albuquerque in the late 19th and early 20th centuries.

Before Albuquerque became the bustling city it is today, the West Mesa was already an integral part of the landscape due to its proximity to Historic Route 66, which ran through Albuquerque starting in the 1920s. This famed highway brought visitors, travelers, and businesses to the area, shaping the Westside’s early identity as a place of both local culture and transitory life.

Along Route 66—also known as Central Avenue—many businesses flourished during the mid-20th century, making the Westside a commercial hub. By the 1950s and 1960s, the highway spurred the growth of motels, diners, and iconic fast food chains like KFC and Long John Silver's that catered to Albuqeurque's westside. Other restaurants like Mac's La Sierra became a favorite on the Westside for both locals and tourists serving New Mexican cuisine.

The West Mesa began its transformation into a more urbanized area after World War II, as Albuquerque’s population grew rapidly. The suburban sprawl on the Westside of the Rio Grande River exploded in the 1950s and 1960s, driven by industrial growth and increased automobile accessibility. Many of the businesses on Route 66 helped solidify the Westside's commercial identity. As Albuquerque's downtown grew increasingly congested, many families and businesses moved westward, looking for more affordable land and homes. The construction of major highways like Interstate 40 and Interstate 25 also facilitated this westward migration.

West Mesa High School holds a unique place in the development of Albuquerque's Westside. Located near Central Avenue, the high school was one of the first major educational institutions to serve the growing Westside neighborhoods. Established in the 1950s, the school’s location near the first wave of suburban developments, including areas like Rolling Hills and West Gate. It attracted military families from Kirtland Air Force Base and those who had settled on the Westside.

With the increasing suburbanization of the West Mesa in the late 20th and early 21st centuries, the region saw the rise of major housing developments like Ventana Ranch, Taylor Ranch, and Paradise Hills.

== Neighborhoods ==
Year	Population
1980	39,602
1990	69,700
2000	114,552
2010	184,996
^{Includes West Mesa region only}

- Anderson Heights
- Cottonwood Height
- Desert Spring Flower
- Eagle Ranch
- El Rancho Grande
- Grande Heights
- La Luz
- Ladera West
- Laurelwood
- Los Volcanes
- Montecito Estates
- Paradise Greens
- Paradise Hills
- Rancho Sereno
- Rolling Hills
- Saltillo
- Santa Fe Village
- Seville
- Skies West
- Stonebridge Pointe
- Stormcloud
- Sunrise
- Taylor Ranch
- The Trails
- Ventana Ranch
- Ventana Ranch West
- Vista Sandia
- Volcano Cliffs
- West Gate (ADDTN 1-12)
- West Gate Heights
- West Gate Vecinos

There are four high schools in the region: Atrisco Heritage High School, Cibola High School, Volcano Vista High School, and West Mesa High School.

== Other geographic features located at the West Mesa ==
- Double Eagle II Airport
- West Mesa Airport (now defunct)
- Nine Mile Hill
- Village of Lost Horizon (part of the former West Mesa Air Force Station)
- Petroglyph National Monument
- Shooting Range Park – a public shooting range owned and operated by the City of Albuquerque
- Bernalillo County Correctional Facility
- Sandia Motor Speedway

== See also ==
- West Mesa Murders
