= La Cueva High School =

High School in New Mexico

Coordinates: 35.183°N 106.555°W

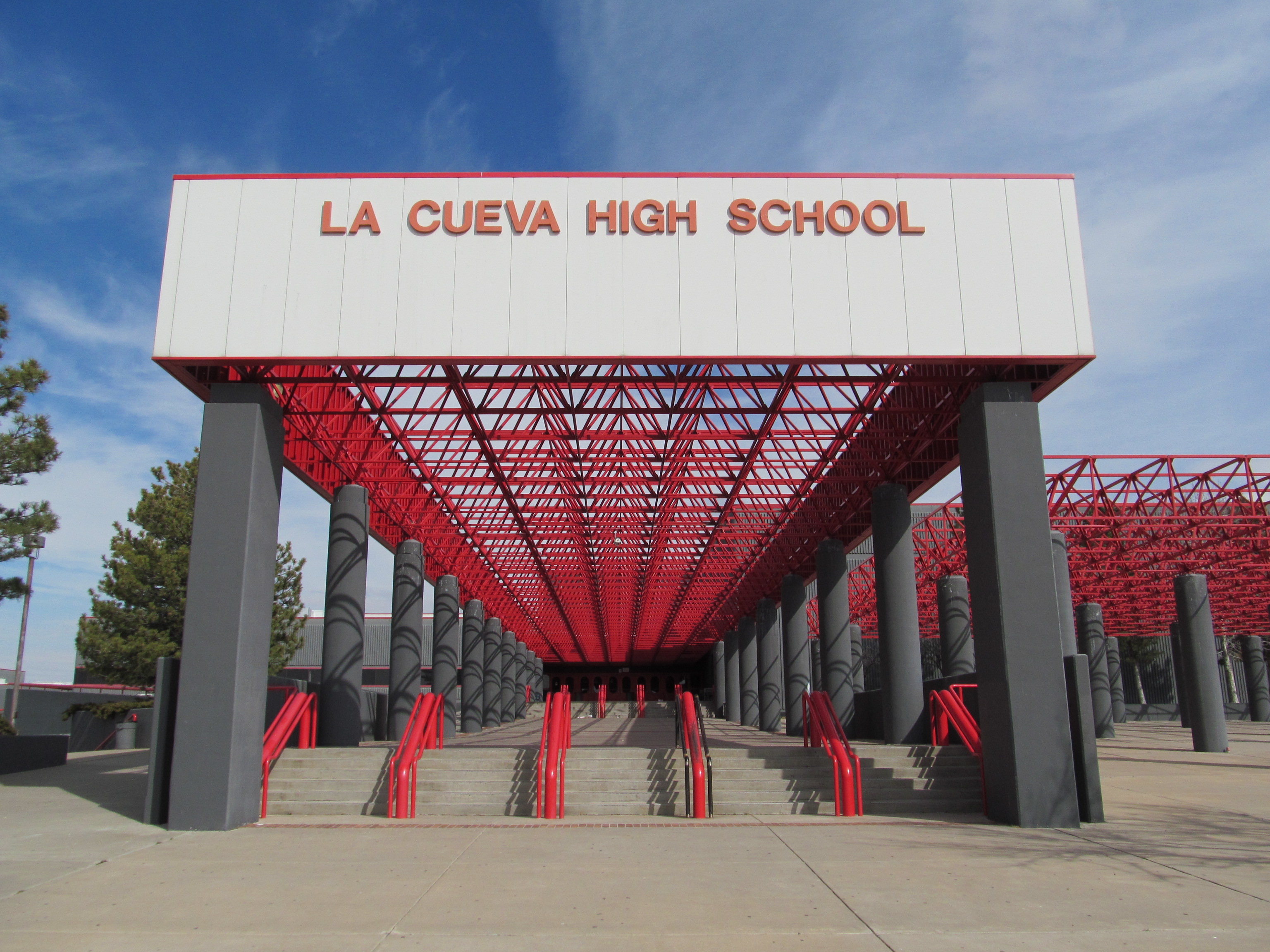
- La Cueva High School

Location
- 7801 Wilshire Ave. NE; Albuquerque, New Mexico 87122; United States

Information
- Type: Public high school
- Established: 1986
- Principal: Darrell Garcia
- Teaching staff: 98.25 (on an FTE basis)
- Enrollment: 1,832 (2023–2024)
- Student to teacher ratio: 18.64
- Campus: Suburban
- Colors: Navy blue Silver; White
- Athletics conference: NMAA, 6A Dist. 2
- Mascot: Bear
- Rival: Eldorado High School
- Website: lacueva.aps.edu

La Cueva High School is a public high school located in northeast Albuquerque, New Mexico, United States, within the Albuquerque Public Schools District. Its mascot is the Bears. The La Cueva feeder schools include Desert Ridge, Madison, and Eisenhower middle schools; and Dennis Chavez, Double Eagle, E. G. Ross, Hubert Humphrey, and North Star elementary schools. La Cueva opened in 1986 with 1200 students.

== School Grade ==
The NMPED (New Mexico Public Education department) replaced the No Child Left Behind Act and AYP testing with a new school grading formula, which took effect for the 2010–11 school year. The grade is calculated using many forms of testing and includes graduation rates.

School year	Grade from NMPED
2010–11	A

== Academics ==
Pat Graff, an English and Journalism teacher, was selected as New Mexico Teacher of the Year and was awarded the Milken Educator Award in 1993. Graff was also named the National Journalism Teacher of the Year (1995) and Disney National English Teacher of the Year (1998), and she was honored with the National Distinguished Service Award by the National Council of Teachers of English (2001). In 2006, she was inducted to the National Teacher Hall of Fame. Graff is now retired.

Frances Gruette, a teacher of AP Calculus AB, was awarded one of the Siemens Awards for Advanced Placement.

In 2018, La Cueva was named as a Top 100 Best Public High School in the U.S. by TheBestSchools.org

== Athletics ==
LCHS competes in the New Mexico Activities Association (NMAA), as a class 6A school in District 2. In addition to La Cueva High School, the schools in District 2-5A include Farmington High School, Piedra Vista High School, Sandia High School, Eldorado High School and West Mesa High School.

LCHS competes in 18 NMAA sport-activity events.

Former Bears include Olympians Lance Ringnald (88) and Nate DiPalma (93). Collegiate All-Americans include Amy Warner (01), Kristen Graczyk (02), Jamie MacArthur (04), Randy Wells (07), Richie Hansen (95), Jennifer Hommert (95), Anna Tuttle (95), Doug Zembiec (91), Jeff Rowland (02), Lauren Goldfarb (09). AJ Bramlett (basketball) (95) played on the University of Arizona's national championship team and Nick Speegle (2000) was drafted and plays football for the Cleveland Browns. Sports Illustrated ranked the Bears as the 24th best overall sports high school in the country.

== Notable alumni ==
- Bryce Alford (class of 2013), professional basketball player
- Zach Arnett (class of 2005), Head Football Coach at Mississippi State University
- Shadrack Kiptoo Biwott, long-distance runner
- A.J. Bramlett (class of 1995), professional basketball player
- Terri Conn (class of 1993), actress
- Marty Crandall, musician
- Jamie Dick (class of 2007), racing driver
- Matthew L. Garcia (class of 1992), United States District Court Judge
- Mitch Garver (class of 2009), MLB catcher for the Seattle Mariners
- Neil Patrick Harris (class of 1991), actor, Emmy and Tony Award winner, star of television's How I Met Your Mother
- Shadrack Kiptoo-biwott, long-distance runner
- Colin O'Malley (class of 1992), composer
- Connor O'Toole, NFL linebacker
- Jordan Pacheco, Major League Baseball player
- James Parr (class of 2004), retired Major League Baseball player
- Tammy Pearman (class of 1991), soccer player for the United States women's national team
- Mason Posa, football linebacker
- Jillion Potter, rugby union player
- Freddie Prinze, Jr. (class of 1994), actor
- Pascual Romero, musician and filmmaker
- Jeff Rowland, soccer player and coach
- Jesse Sandoval, musician
- Caitlin Shaw (class of 2008), stock car racing driver
- Jarrin Solomon, Olympic bronze medalist
- Nick Speegle (class of 2000), NFL linebacker
- Tony Vincent (class of 1991), actor
- Douglas A. Zembiec (class of 1991), U.S. Marine Corps officer
