= Manzano High School =

High School in New Mexico

Coordinates: 35°05′08″N 106°30′39″W

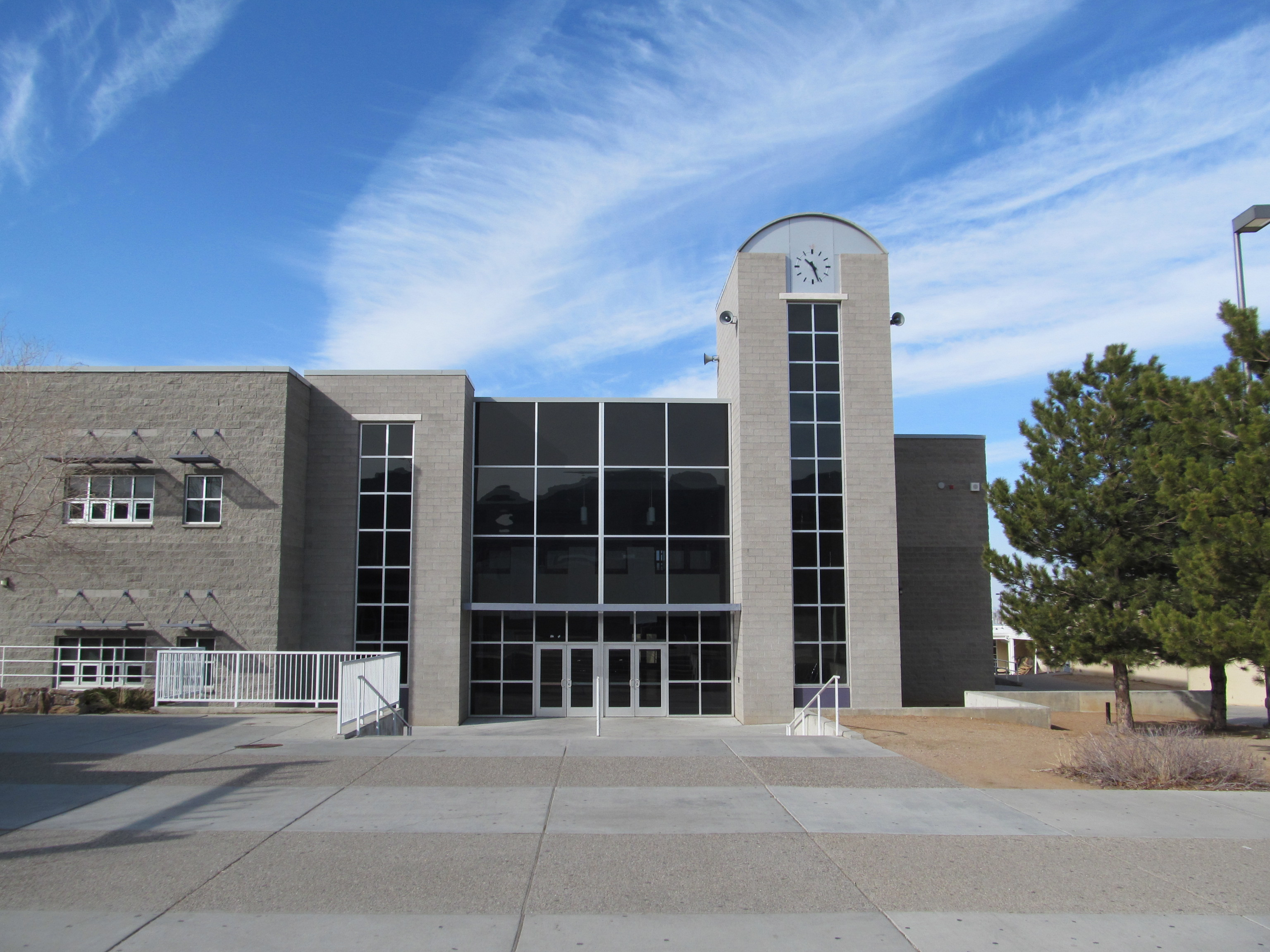

Location
- 12200 Lomas Blvd. NE; Albuquerque, New Mexico 87112; United States

Information
- Type: Public high school
- Motto: "Through relationships, rigor and relevance, we strive: To create self-sufficient, contributing members of the community To promote student achievement in academic, artistic and applied disciplines To develop the skills necessary to enhance each student's future"
- Established: 1961
- Principal: Rachel Vigil
- Teaching staff: 90.35 (FTE)
- Enrollment: 1,157 (2024–2025)
- Student to teacher ratio: 12.81
- Color
- Athletics conference: NMAA, 6A Dist. 2
- Rival: Eldorado High
- Mascot: Monarch
- Website: http://manzano.aps.edu

Manzano High School is a public high school located in northeast Albuquerque, New Mexico. It is part of the Albuquerque Public Schools system.

== History ==
While still sophomores, Manzano's first senior class attended classes at Sandia High School (1959–1960), sharing the facility. The next school year (1960–1961), the Manzano students, now juniors, along with the new sophomore class, started the year at Sandia, and, when the new school was ready, moved into Manzano High on December 19, 1960. Seniors who lived in the new Manzano boundaries that year remained at Sandia, regardless of which district they lived in, so the new school opened with only sophomores and juniors attending. The first senior class was graduated on June 6, 1962. The school has now been in operation at its original location for over sixty years.

== Athletics ==
MHS competes in the New Mexico Activities Association (NMAA), as a class 6A school in District 2. In 2014, NMAA realigned the state's schools into six classifications and adjusted district boundaries.

In 1988, Manzano High School hosted the National Association of Student Councils National Conference which was led in effort by Activities Director/Student Council Adviser Libby Tilley, who served as executive director of the New Mexico Association of Student Councils for roughly 18 years from 1993 to 2011.

In March 2006, the Monarch varsity boys' basketball team defeated Alamogordo to win the Class 5A championship. It was Manzano's first state title in boys' basketball since 1974.

On December 2, 2017, Manzano defeated their cross-town rival La Cueva High School to complete an undefeated season (13–0) and win the New Mexico Class 6-A football championship under head coach Chad Adcox.

== Notable alumni ==
- Janelle Anyanonu, member of the New Mexico House of Representatives
- Jordan Byrd, American football wide receiver
- Martin Chávez, Mayor of Albuquerque
- Kent Cravens, businessman and former member of the New Mexico Senate
- Gerell Elliott, MLS soccer player
- Rodney Ferguson, NFL running back
- Holly Holm (2000), professional mixed martial arts fighter; former Women's UFC bantamweight division champion
- Michael Holyfield, basketball player
- T. J. Holyfield, professional basketball player
- Sondra Isaminger, singer
- Mitchell Parker, pitcher for the Washington Nationals
- C. Shane Reese, 14th president of Brigham Young University
- Lynne Russell, former CNN reporter
- Ricky Siglar, NFL offensive tackle
- Billy Smith, former MLB player (California Angels, Baltimore Orioles, San Francisco Giants)
