= Valley High School (New Mexico) =

Coordinates: 35°07′30″N 106°39′39″W

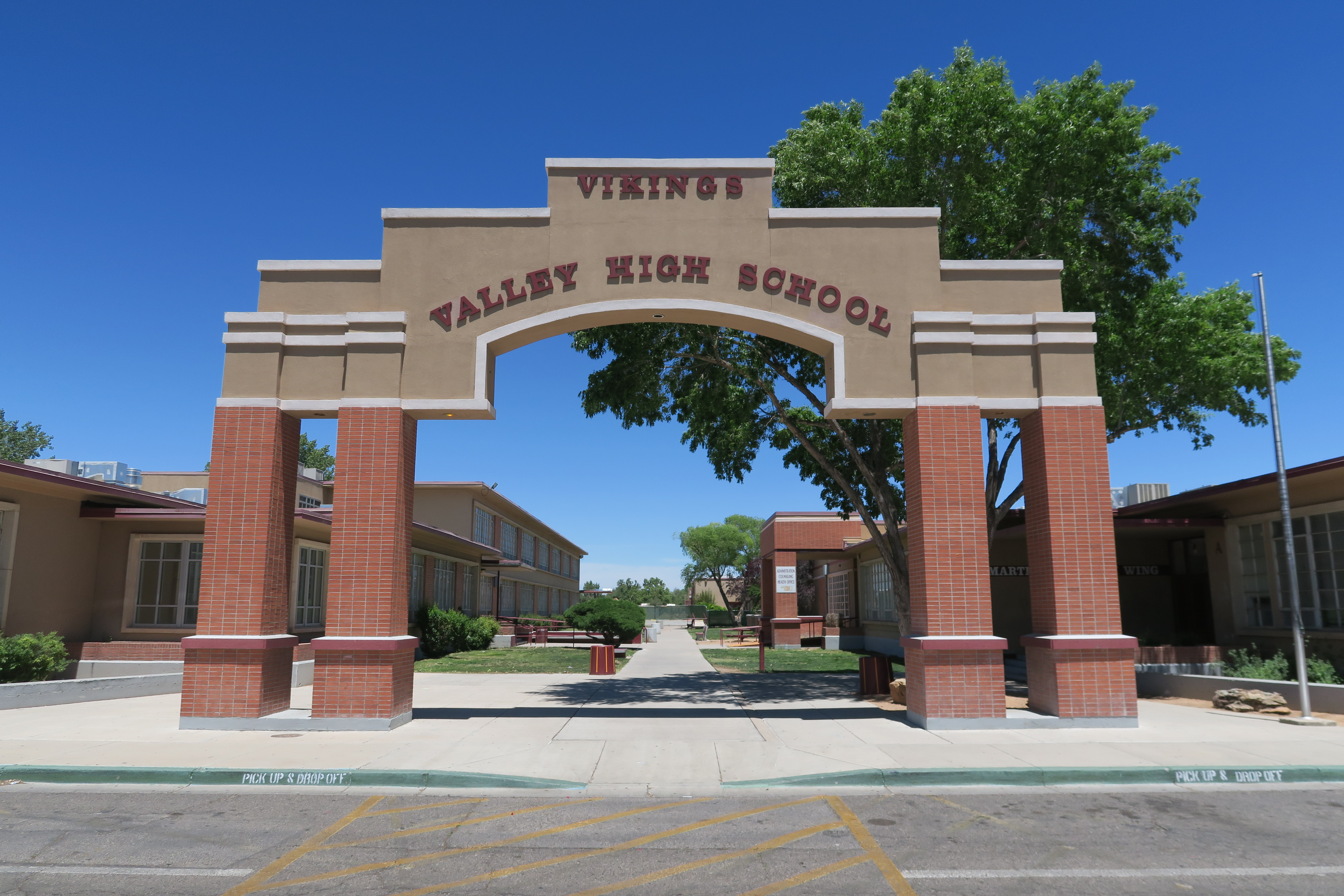
- Valley High School

Location
- 1505 Candelaria Rd. NW; Albuquerque, New Mexico 87107; United States

Information
- Type: Public high school
- Established: 1954
- Principal: Anthony Griego
- Staff: 70.95 (FTE)
- Enrollment: 1,012 (2023-2024)
- Student to teacher ratio: 14.26
- Campus: Suburban
- Colors: Maroon and Gold
- Athletics conference: NMAA, 6A Dist. 5
- Mascot: Vikings
- Rival: Rio Grande; Albuquerque High; West Mesa High; Atrisco Heritage High
- Website: Official website

Valley High School is a public high school in the city of Albuquerque, New Mexico, United States. It is part of the Albuquerque Public Schools district. The school opened in 1954 and enrolls around 1,800 students.

== Athletics ==
VHS competes in the New Mexico Activities Association (NMAA), as a class 6A school in District 5. In 2014, the NMAA realigned the state's schools in to six classifications and adjusted district boundaries. In addition to Valley High School, the schools in District 5-6A include West Mesa High School, Rio Grande High School, Albuquerque High School and Atrisco Heritage Academy High School.

== Notable alumni ==
- Brittney Barreras, former member of the New Mexico House of Representatives
- Patti Cohenour, actress
- Charles Duhigg, Pulitzer Prize-winning reporter and best-selling author
- Arian Foster, former running back for the Houston Texans and Miami Dolphins
- F. Chris Garcia, 17th president of the University of New Mexico
- Sid Gutierrez, astronaut
- Shammara Henderson, judge of the New Mexico Court of Appeals
- Minka Kelly, actress
- Michael Larson, investment manager
- Moe Maestas, member of the New Mexico Senate
- Teton Saltes, former NFL player
- Bobby Shew, jazz trumpeter
- Kenneth Tolon II, football running back
- Gregory Zanetti, military officer and politician
- Teresa Zanetti, former member of the New Mexico House of Representatives
