= Speegle =

Speegle is a surname. Notable people with this surname include:

- Cliff Speegle (1917–1994), American football player;
- Jean Speegle Howard (1927–2000), American actress;
- Nick Speegle (born 1981), American American football player.
