= Atrisco Heritage Academy High School =

High School in New Mexico

Coordinates: 35°01′21″N 106°44′58″W

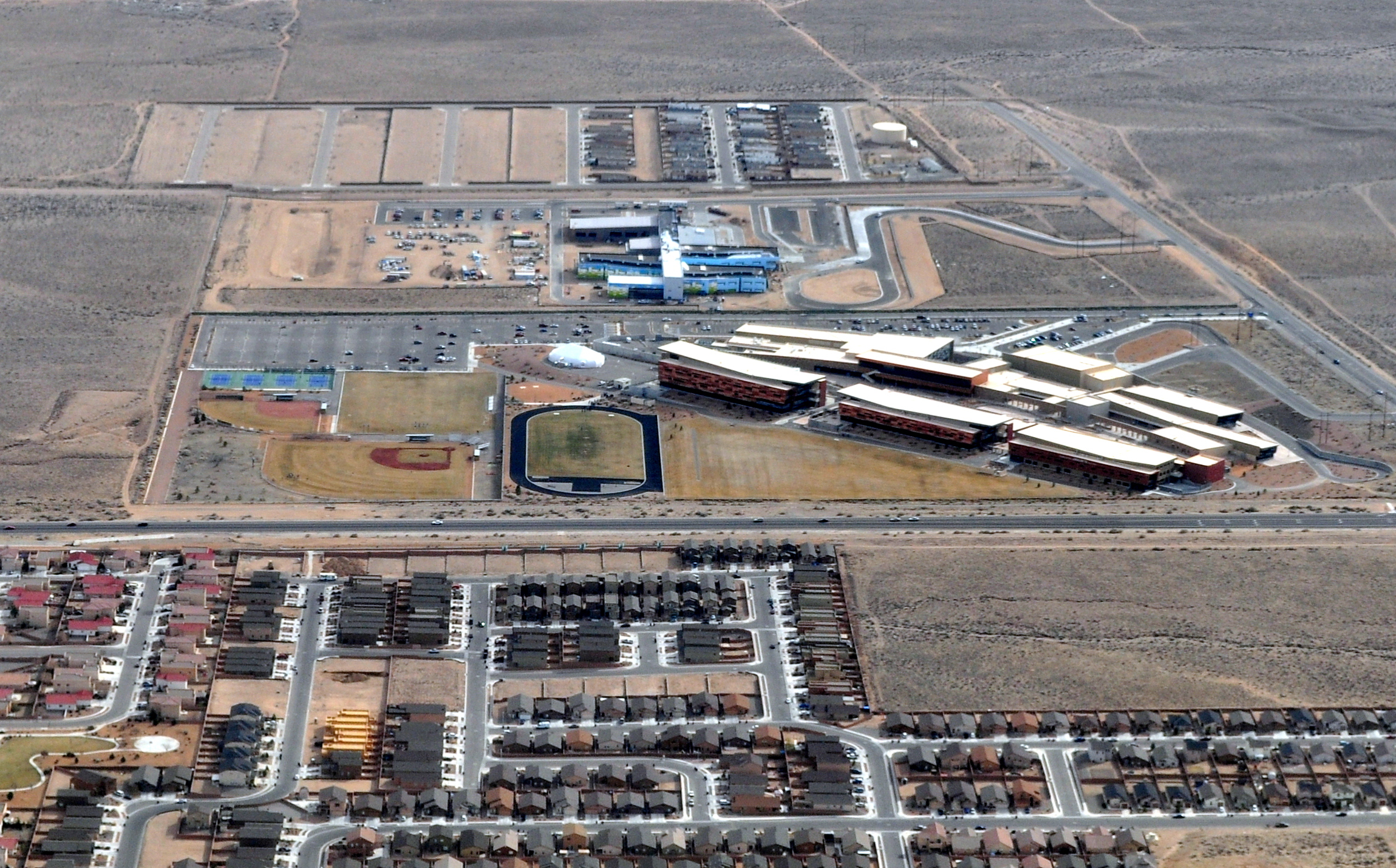
- Aerial view, looking roughly south (2015)

Location
- 10800 Dennis Chavez Blvd. SW; Albuquerque postal address, New Mexico 87121; United States

Information
- Type: Public high school
- Established: 2008
- Principal: Anthony Lovato
- Staff: 128.40 (FTE)
- Enrollment: 2,114 (2022-2023)
- Student to teacher ratio: 16.46
- Campus: Suburban
- Colors: Vegas gold Navy blue Forest green
- Athletics conference: NMAA, 6A Dist. 5
- Mascot: Jaguar
- Rival: Rio Grande; West Mesa; Volcano Vista
- Website: aha.aps.edu

Atrisco Heritage Academy High School (AHAHS), better known as Atrisco Heritage, is a public high school in Albuquerque, New Mexico, United States. It is located on the city’s West Mesa. It is a part of the Albuquerque Public Schools. The school is named after the Atrisco Land Grant. Enrollment at AHAHS was expected to be 2,200 in the fall of 2011.

The mascot of AHAHS is a Jaguar, chosen by the first freshman class.

== History ==
=== Drag show controversy ===
On April 20, 2024, administrators at Atrisco Heritage Academy High School held a prom event at a local convention center featuring a drag performer. The incident prompted Albuquerque Public Schools to dismiss several employees at the school, including principal Irene Cisneros, naming Anthony Lovato as the school's acting principal.

== Academics ==
=== School grade ===
The NMPED (New Mexico Public Education Department) replaced the No Child Left Behind Act and AYP testing with a new school grading formula, which took effect in the 2010–11 school year. The grade is calculated using many forms of testing, and includes graduation rates.

School year	Grade from NMPED
2010–11	C

=== Student body statistics ===
Ethnicity	This school	State average
White (not Hispanic)	10%	29%
Hispanic (of any race)	85%	56%
American Indian/Alaskan Native	3%	11%
African American	1%	3%
Pacific Islander	<1%	1%

== Athletics ==
AHAHS competes in the New Mexico Activities Association (NMAA) as a class 6A school in District 5. In 2014, the NMAA realigned the state's schools in to six classifications and adjusted district boundaries. AHAHS Won the 2019 NMAA Class 5A State Basketball state championship In addition to Atrisco Heritage Academy High School, the schools in District 5-6A include West Mesa High School, Rio Grande High School, Valley High School and Albuquerque High School.

== Location for filming ==
The 2012 movie The Avengers was partly filmed at Atrisco High, and the school was featured 30 seconds into the trailer.

The 2011 movie Lemonade Mouth was partially filmed here as well.

The location was used as the corporate headquarters for Madrigal, a fictional German conglomerate in the 2008 drama series Breaking Bad.
