= Las Cruces Catholic School =

Location
- 1331 North Miranda Street; Las Cruces, New Mexico 88005; United States; 32°19′14″N 106°47′23″W

Information
- Type: Private, PreK, Elementary, middle school
- Religious affiliation: Roman Catholic
- Established: 1927
- Principal: Windy Drake
- Grades: K-8
- Enrollment: 350 (2017)
- Colors: Navy Blue, Green,
- Athletics conference: NMAA
- Team name: Knights
- Accreditation: Western Catholic Education Association
- Website: School Website

Las Cruces Catholic School is a private, Roman Catholic PreK, Elementary, and middle school in Las Cruces, New Mexico. It was established in 1927. It is located within the Roman Catholic Diocese of Las Cruces. It is an affiliate member of the NMAA.
