= Sondra Isaminger =

American singer (1956–2008)

Sondra Isaminger (1956–2008) was a singer and community leader based in Albuquerque, New Mexico.

== Early years ==
Isaminger was born the youngest of four daughters near Swindon, county Wiltshire, England (UK) on December 27, 1956. Her father was Clarence "Sonny" Bracken and her mother was "Bobbie" Bracken. Sonny was serving in the US Air Force and was a notable welterweight boxer in his day. By age 12, Isaminger and family had relocated briefly to Lincoln, Nebraska and then on to Albuquerque, New Mexico, the place she would eventually call home. Growing up in Albuquerque, Isaminger attended Manzano High School where she appeared in plays and sang publicly. By age 16, she was performing professionally with various local bands and worked as a part-time fashion model for local retailers. Isaminger's started singing professionally, touring the west coast with various show bands.

== Career ==
In 1979-1980, Sondra sang lead and was the front person in the pop dance group Mikado. This group traveled throughout the west coast, touring in Oregon, Washington, California, Wyoming and New Mexico. The band consisted of Brett Von Volkenburg (her husband) and lead guitarist, Sondra Von Volkenburg, John Abraham, drums, Steve Lewis, rhythm guitarist and vocalist, Carl Falls, bassist and vocalist and Anne Baisch, Keyboardist and vocalist.

In 1982, while still traveling and singing professionally, Isaminger met guitarist John Isaminger. For a brief period, the two became rock-and-roll artists and spent time on the road. On April 27, 1984, they were married at the Bernalillo County Court House.

In 1985 their daughter Victoria was born, followed by Michelle in 1988. Isaminger became executive director for the John Robert Powers Modeling Agency. In 1995, at the age of seven, their daughter Michelle was diagnosed with adrenal cortical carcinoma, a condition traced to a genetic tendency called Li-Fraumeni syndrome; after painful and intensive treatment she died in December 1996. Five months later Sondra herself was also diagnosed with a genetic form of cancer, also linked to Li-Fraumeni syndrome. She underwent treatment that sent her disease into remission. This spurred Isaminger to join the musical group "Under the Influence" and to carry out much community service, including for those affected by cancer.

With her cancer in remission, Isaminger launched into a campaign of community service and positive activism. The popular Christian band “Under the Influence" was formed with her husband John in 1997 and performed original music and cover songs. With Calvary Chapel of Albuquerque as a home base and Pastor Skip Heitzig as a friend and mentor, "Under the Influence" organized fundraising and other events aimed at assisting individuals and families in need within the Albuquerque community, including help for the homeless, education of New Mexican prison inmates, Native American outreach and other similar causes. Sondra herself founded the program "My New Attitude" aimed at empowering women from all situations and walks of life to fight depression and self-esteem issues.

In 2003 Isaminger's cancer returned, requiring surgery and aggressive treatments; she died on January 8, 2008. The funeral at Calvary Chapel of Albuquerque was attended by numerous families, friends, those she had helped. and local news media.

== Sondra Isaminger Cancer Foundation ==
Founded in 2009 by husband John, the Sondra Isaminger Cancer Foundation is a non-profit entity (501(c) organization) commemorating Sondra which seeks to assist cancer victims and their families with non-medical needs while they receive treatment in Albuquerque, NM. The foundation held a large fund-raising event on August 22, 2009, at the National Hispanic Cultural Center; many New Mexico bands donated their time and talent.
