= Teton Saltes =

American football player (born 1998)

No. 50
- Position: Offensive tackle

Personal information
- Born: May 4, 1998 (age 28); Pine Ridge Indian Reservation, South Dakota, U.S.
- Listed height: 6 ft 5 in (1.96 m)
- Listed weight: 300 lb (136 kg)

Career information
- High school: Valley (Albuquerque, New Mexico)
- College: New Mexico
- NFL draft: 2021: undrafted

Career history
- New York Jets (2021); Michigan Panthers (2022); Arlington Renegades (2023); St. Louis Battlehawks (2024–2025); Orlando Storm (2026)*
- * Offseason or practice squad member only

Awards and highlights
- XFL champion (2023); Wuerffel Trophy (2020)
- Stats at Pro Football Reference

Teton Saltes (born May 4, 1998) is an American former professional football offensive tackle. He played college football at the University of New Mexico, where he was the 2020 recipient of the Wuerffel Trophy, awarded to the player who "best combines exemplary community service with athletic and academic achievement."

== Early life ==
Saltes initially focused on playing basketball and did not play football until his junior year of high school. After starting football, he received offers from schools such as San Diego State, Texas Tech, and Iowa State. Ultimately, he committed to playing college football at New Mexico in 2016.

== College career ==
After redshirting his true freshman season, Saltes transitioned from the defensive line to the offensive line and earned the starting right tackle job. He was named an honorable mention to the All-Mountain West team in 2019 as a redshirt junior, and was selected to the All-Mountain West third-team by Pro Football Focus.

In his redshirt senior season, Saltes was recognized for his community service work, receiving the Wuerffel Trophy, and serving as team captain of the Allstate AFCA Good Works Team.

== Professional career ==
=== New York Jets ===
Saltes went undrafted in the 2021 NFL draft, but signed with the New York Jets as an undrafted free agent. He was waived/injured on August 9, 2021, and placed on injured reserve. Saltes was released by the Jets on October 25.

=== Michigan Panthers ===
Saltes was selected with the fourth pick of the sixth round by the Michigan Panthers on February 22, 2022, during the 2022 USFL draft. He was added to the inactive roster on May 5, with an illness. Saltes was moved to the active roster on May 11.

=== Arlington Renegades ===
The Arlington Renegades selected Saltes in the first round of the 2023 XFL Supplemental Draft on January 1, 2023. He was placed on the reserve list by the team on February 24, and activated on April 25.

Saltes re-signed with the team on January 29, 2024. He was released by the Renegades on March 10.

=== St. Louis Battlehawks ===
On March 18, 2024, Saltes signed with the St. Louis Battlehawks of the United Football League (UFL). He re-signed with the Battlehawks on August 5. Saltes was released on March 20, 2025. Saltes was re-signed on May 9.

=== Orlando Storm ===
On January 13, 2026, Saltes was selected by the Orlando Storm in the 2026 UFL Draft.

== Personal life ==
Saltes lived on the Pine Ridge Indian Reservation in South Dakota before leaving the reservation with his mother when she got into medical school, eventually settling in New Mexico. He still returns to Pine Ridge every summer to mentor children on the reservation, as well as bring awareness to suicides among Native Americans in the United States.
