= Kim Jew =

American photographer and entrepreneur

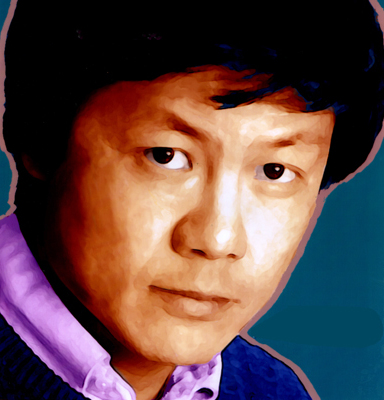
- Born: Melvin Kim Jew; July 18, 1952
- Education: Photography Institute of America
- Occupation: Photographer
- Website: kimjew.org

Melvin Kim Jew (born July 18, 1952) is an American photographer and entrepreneur, and the founder and owner of Kim Jew Portrait Art in Albuquerque, New Mexico.

== Biography ==
Jew grew up in Albuquerque, New Mexico and attended Highland High School. He began dabbling in photography in high school when he got his first camera, a Pentax Spotmatic 35mm. Eventually, Jew went on to earn an Associates of Art in Photography from the Photography Institute of America in Atlanta, a division of the Art Institute of America, in 1974. After attending school in Georgia, Jew became a part-time photographer for the Tamarind Institute at the University of New Mexico where he photographed famous artists, such as Louise Nevelson, Fritz Scholder, Robert De Niro Sr. and Francoise Gilot. From there, Jew began his own business, Kim Jew Photography.

Jew has photographed dozens of politicians, presidents and world leaders, as well as numerous celebrities; he is an honorary commander at Kirtland Air Force Base and has been taking professional photographs for over 35 years.

== Kim Jew Portrait Art ==
In 1976, Jew started his own company, Kim Jew Portrait Art, based in Nob Hill, Albuquerque. It has grown into a million dollar enterprise that includes two portrait studios with over 24 employees, including 5 staff photographers. Kim Jew Portrait Art was one of the first portrait studios in the United States to use digital, pioneering the Phase One digital backs.

According to Jew, "I've learned that people's self-image comes from that last picture taken of them. It really does have an influence on the psyche and translates into self-esteem."

Jew shares his love of photography in the Albuquerque community by mentoring high school students interested in photography.

=== Notability ===
Jew has received recognition by members of the Albuquerque community, as well as the larger art community, for his work. Some of his awards include honors from the Weems International Art Fest and the Judges’ Choice Award at the National Senior Portrait Artists Portfolio Competition in 2005. In Albuquerque he co-sponsored the 2010 Albuquerque International Balloon Fiesta Photo Contest.

Some of the notable subjects of Jew's work include former U.S. Presidents George W. Bush, Bill Clinton, George H. W. Bush, and Barack Obama, along with Sir Richard Branson, Steve Jobs, Bryan Cranston, Aaron Paul, Jay Leno, Dana Carvey, Sophia Loren, Tony Bennett, Don Rickles, Miss USA Mai Shanley, Jesse Tyler Ferguson, and the late Tim Russert. Jew's work has also been featured in many national publications, including American Profile, Parade, Women's Wear Daily, Harper's Bazaar, American Photographer, Studio magazine, Photo District News, Scientific American, GQ, Cuisine, New Mexico Magazine, and Tiger Beat.

The company was named 2013 Small Business of the Year by the Greater Albuquerque Chamber of Commerce.

Jew was elected to serve on the board of directors of the Albuquerque Museum Foundation commencing July 1, 2015.

Kim Jew Portrait Art also received Albuquerque Journal's Readers' Choice Award 5 years in a row from 2019 to 2023. Jew is also featured in the book "Legendary Locals of Albuquerque" by an award-winning author from the University of New Mexico, history professor Richard Melzer.
