= Chase Silseth =

American baseball player (born 2000)

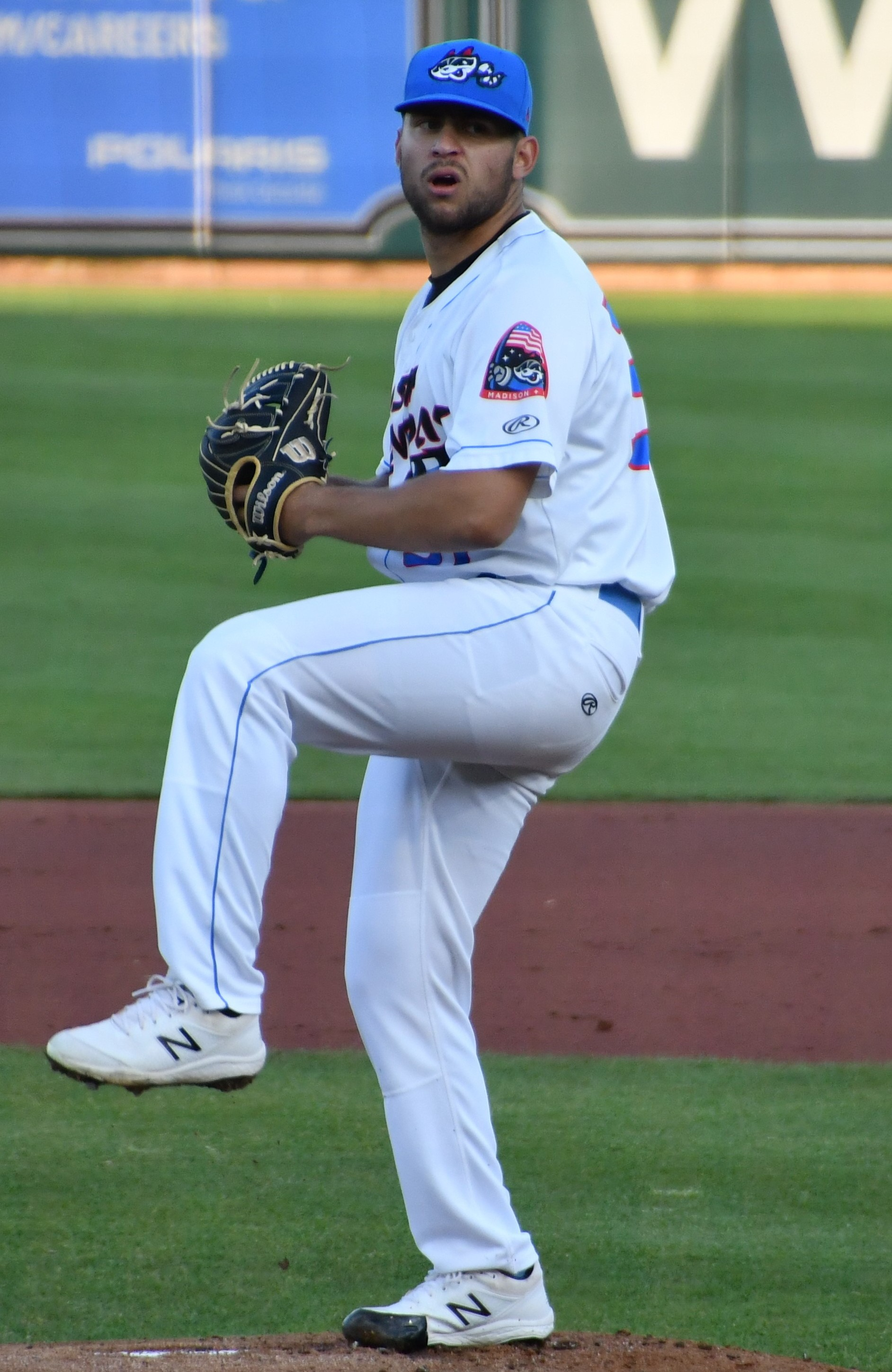
- Silseth with the Rocket City Trash Pandas

Texas Rangers – No. 63
- Pitcher
- Born: May 18, 2000 (age 26); Farmington, New Mexico, U.S.
- Bats: Right Throws: Right

MLB debut
- May 13, 2022, for the Los Angeles Angels

MLB statistics (through 2026 season)
- Win–loss record: 8–9
- Earned run average: 4.28
- Strikeouts: 179
- Stats at Baseball Reference

Teams
- Los Angeles Angels (2022–2026); Texas Rangers (2026–present)

Chase Robert Silseth (born May 18, 2000) is an American professional baseball pitcher for the Texas Rangers of Major League Baseball (MLB). He has previously played in MLB for the Los Angeles Angels.

Silseth was born and raised in Farmington, New Mexico, where he played baseball for Piedra Vista High School. He played college baseball at the University of Tennessee, College of Southern Nevada, and the University of Arizona. Silseth was selected in the 11th round of the 2021 Major League Baseball draft by the Angels and signed with the team, forgoing his senior year of college. He made his MLB debut on May 13, 2022, becoming the first player in the 2021 draft class to reach the major leagues. The Angels traded him to the Rangers at the 2026 trade deadline.

== Amateur career ==
Silseth grew up in Farmington, New Mexico and attended Piedra Vista High School. As a junior, he pitched to an 8–2 win–loss record with a 0.56 earned run average (ERA) and 116 strikeouts. Silseth committed to play college baseball at the University of Tennessee in November of his senior year. He was named the New Mexico Gatorade Player of the Year in his senior season after he went 7–3 with a 1.25 ERA and 53 strikeouts in 56 innings pitched and also batted .328.

As a freshman with the Tennessee Volunteers, Silseth went 1–1 with a 4.35 ERA in 18 appearances. Silseth transferred to the College of Southern Nevada after his freshman year and played one season before transferring to the University of Arizona to play for the Arizona Wildcats. In his lone season with the Wildcats, he posted an 8–1 record with a 5.55 ERA and 105 strikeouts in 18 starts.

== Professional career ==
=== Los Angeles Angels ===
Silseth was selected in the 11th round by the Los Angeles Angels in the 2021 Major League Baseball draft. After signing with the team he was assigned to the Arizona Complex League Angels before being promoted to the Double-A Rocket City Trash Pandas. Silseth returned to the Trash Pandas to start the 2022 season and was named the Southern League Pitcher of the Month for April. After the season, he was chosen for the Southern League Pitcher of the Year Award.

On May 13, 2022, the Angels selected Silseth's contract and promoted him to the active roster. He made his major league debut that night against the Oakland Athletics, pitching six scoreless innings while striking out four batters. Silseth became the first player from the 2021 MLB draft to debut in MLB. Silseth made seven starts for the Angels in his rookie campaign, posting a 1–3 record and 6.59 earned run average (ERA) with 24 strikeouts in 28.2 innings pitched.

Silseth began incorporating a cutter the next year during spring training in 2023, but struggled and was optioned to the Triple-A Salt Lake Bees to begin the 2023 season. He was promoted to the active roster on April 26, 2023. He made his first appearance of the season that night against the Oakland Athletics, pitching 2 scoreless innings in relief. On August 26, Silseth was struck in the head by a thrown ball from Trey Cabbage while running to back up third base in the fourth inning of a game against the New York Mets. He was assisted off the field and taken to a hospital for tests. Silseth was alert and able to speak en route, and was released from the hospital the same night. However, the Angels placed him on the 7-day injured list with a concussion on August 29. After making two rehab starts with Salt Lake, Silseth returned to the Angels and made one last major league start before the end of the season, in which he pitched four innings and allowed one run. He finished the season with a 3.96 ERA and 56 strikeouts in 52.1 innings pitched. Silseth began the 2024 season out of the Angels' rotation, logging a 6.75 ERA with 12 strikeouts across 2 starts. He was placed on the injured list with right elbow inflammation on April 8, 2024, and was later transferred to the 60–day injured list on April 30. On June 25, Silseth was activated from the injured list and optioned to Triple–A Salt Lake. On August 6, it was announced that Silseth would miss the remainder of the season after undergoing elbow surgery.

Silseth was optioned to Triple-A Salt Lake to begin the 2025 season. He made the Angels Opening Day roster in 2026.

=== Texas Rangers ===
On July 29, 2026, the Angels traded Silseth to the Texas Rangers, along with Logan O'Hoppe, in exchange for Angel Arredondo.
