= Ryan McGarvey =

American singer & guitarist (born 1986)

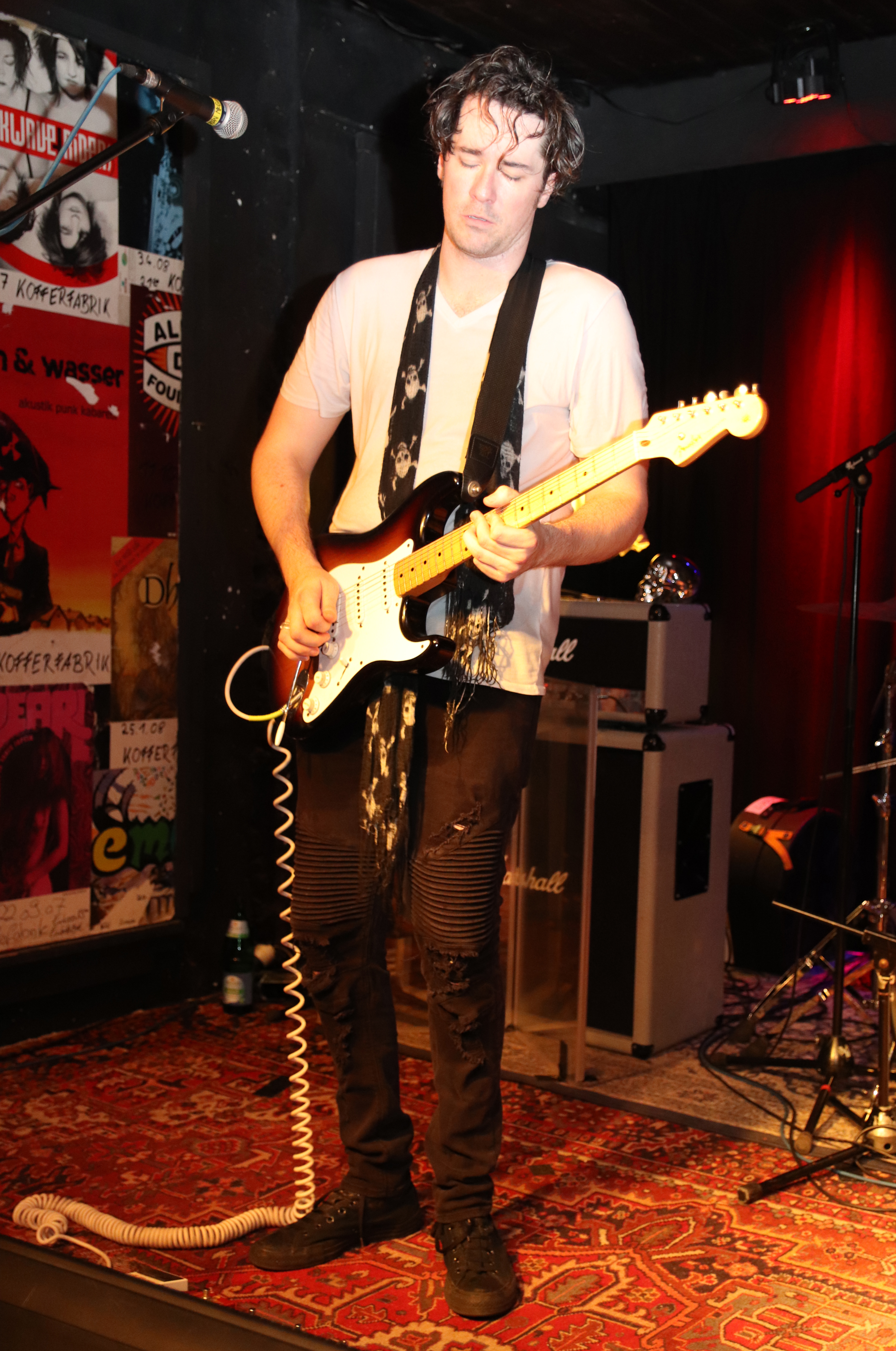
- Ryan McGarvey in 2018 in Fürth, Germany

Background information
- Born: October 30, 1986 (age 39); Albuquerque, New Mexico, United States
- Genre: Blues rock
- Occupations: Singer, guitarist, songwriter
- Instruments: Vocals, guitar
- Years active: 2000s–present

Ryan McGarvey (born October 30, 1986) is an American blues rock singer, guitarist, and songwriter. Starting in 2007 with Forward in Reverse, McGarvey has released five albums to date. Throughout his career, he shared the stage with Eric Clapton, Jeff Beck, B.B. King, Joe Bonamassa, Gov't Mule, the Fabulous Thunderbirds, John Mayer, Sheryl Crow, Buddy Guy, Vince Gill and ZZ Top. He was influenced by Joe Bonamassa, Jimi Hendrix and Stevie Ray Vaughan.

== Life and career ==
McGarvey was born in Albuquerque, New Mexico, United States. He was educated at the Eldorado High School. In 2006, he was named Guitar Center's 'Guitarmaggeddon: Next King Of The Blues' champion of New Mexico. The same year, Joe Bonamassa stated "I met Ryan in 2006 and was very impressed at the depth of his influence and his ability to put said influences together in his own way..." In 2007, McGarvey released his debut album, Forward in Reverse. This led to him being granted a New Mexico Music Award for 'Blues Song of the Year' for his self-penned album track, "Cryin' Over You." In 2007 and 2008, McGarvey was named 'Blues Act Of The Year', in the Weekly Alibi's Annual Readers Poll. McGarvey was voted 'Best Musician' by Albuquerque the Magazine 's annual 'Best Of The City' readers poll in 2008, 2010, and 2012 (also bagging 'Best Vocalist' in 2009). In 2010, McGarvey was chosen by Eric Clapton to perform at Clapton's Crossroads Guitar Festival, held that year in Toyota Park in Bridgeview, Illinois. In advance of a planned New Year's Eve show in December 2011 in his hometown, McGarvey spoke to the Albuquerque Journal. He said "Being picked by Eric Clapton and being able to perform at his festival in Chicago has to take the cake for me." He and his band had just finished a tour in Europe prior to the interview and he noted, "We had amazing tour playing in Germany, Belgium, the Netherlands and Austria. We were there the entire month of November. We had a total of maybe two nights off, which one of those was driving around 13 hours from our Thanksgiving gig in Vienna to where we were headed next, in the Netherlands to do two shows".

His sophomore album, Redefined, was released in 2012. On May 14, 2013, McGarvey was undertaking a UK tour, and was supported by Planet Graffitti at his gig at the Beaverwood Club in Chislehurst, London, England. That year McGarvey received the award of 'Best New Talent' from Guitar Player magazine. Over this period McGarvey and his Band undertook on three European tours. His next release, The Road Chosen was issued in 2014. McGarvey spent much of the next two years touring in promotion of the album. He commented on his success in Europe compared to this homeland and noted "... in Europe, it is completely a different world. The kind of promotion we get in Europe is different and bigger. It's different for an artist or a band in terms of fans appreciation too".

In October 2016, Sage Gateshead's Hall 2 saw a concert given by McGarvey and his ensemble, again promoting The Road Chosen. In 2018, McGarvey released two albums. One was a live album, Live at Swinghouse, and the second was a studio recording, Heavy Hearted. Heavy Hearted was McGarvey's fifth album in eleven years, and on the recording his singing and guitar work was augmented by drummer Logan Nix and bassist Carmine Rojas.

== Discography ==
=== Albums ===
Year	Title	Record label
2007	Forward in Reverse	Forward In Reverse Music
2012	Redefined	Forward In Reverse Music
2014	The Road Chosen	Forward In Reverse Music
2018	Live at Swinghouse	Forward In Reverse Music
2018	Heavy Hearted	Forward In Reverse Music
