= Highland High School (Albuquerque) =

Coordinates: 35°4′28.46″N 106°35′30.90″W

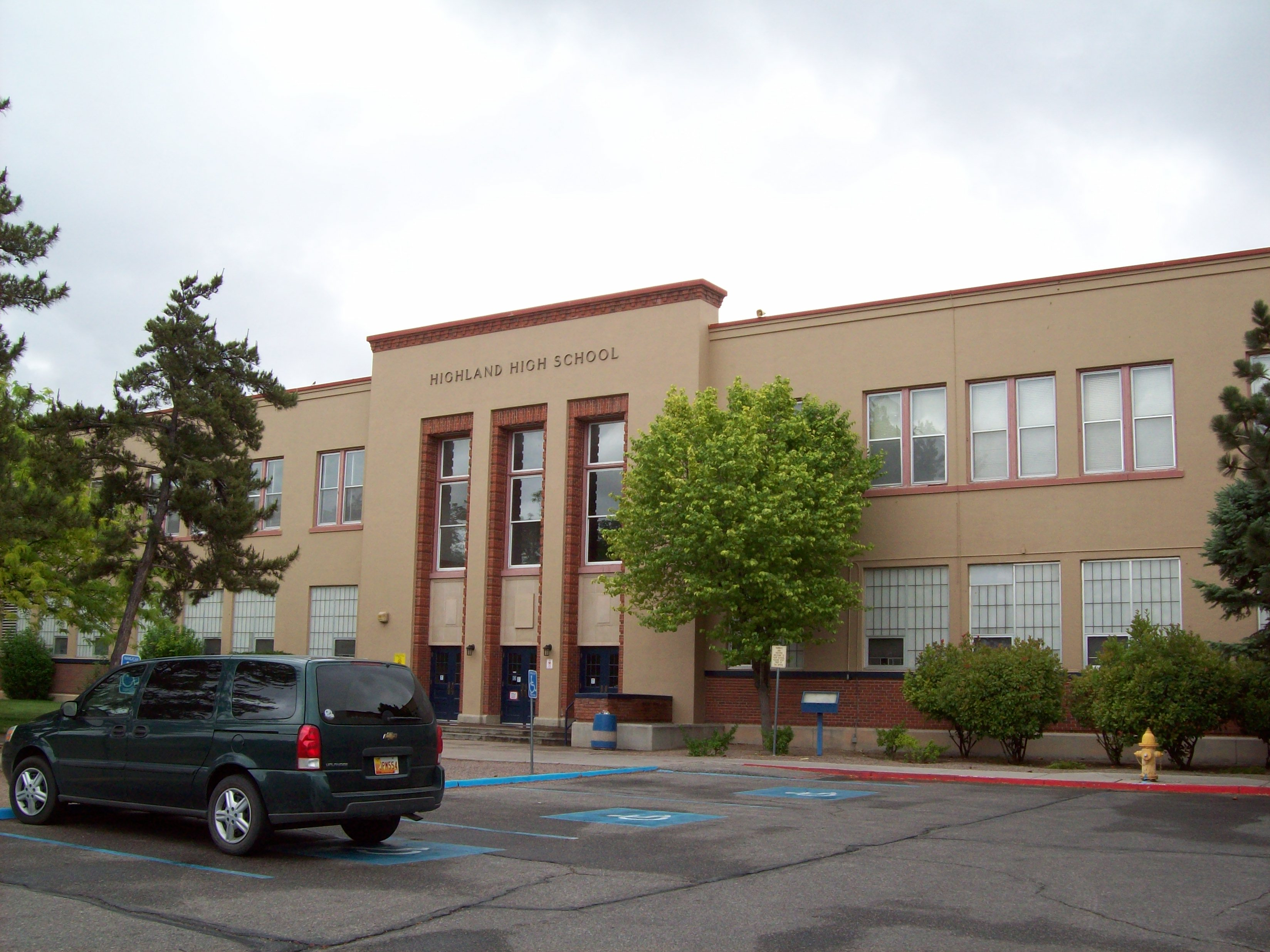
- 4700 Coal Avenue SE; Albuquerque, New Mexico, 87108; United States

Information
- Type: Public high school
- Motto: Motivate. Educate. Graduate.
- Established: Fall 1949
- Principal: Alfonso Otero
- Staff: 81.40 (FTE)
- Enrollment: 1,169 (2023-2024)
- Student to teacher ratio: 14.36
- Colors: Navy Blue, Gold, and White
- Athletics conference: NMAA, 4A Dist. 6
- Mascot: "Herbie" the Hornet
- Nickname: Hornets
- Rivals: Albuquerque High; Manzano High
- Website: highland.aps.edu

Highland High School is a public high school located in southeast Albuquerque, New Mexico, United States. It is part of the Albuquerque Public Schools District.

The school's mascot is Herbie the Hornet, named after a naval ship, the aircraft carrier USS Hornet. This led to the school colors of navy blue and gold. The United States Navy also conducts a Junior Reserve Officer Training Corps as an elective in the curriculum.

== Extracurricular activities ==
=== Clubs and organizations at Highland ===
Highland's We The People (Competition) team has won the state championship since 2000 (with the exception of 2006). The team is coached by Steve Seth and Bob Coffey. On December 9, 2004, the team claimed its fifth state championship. When they went on to Nationals, they came in 4th place in the nation in 2005. In April, 2007 the We The People team received the Mountain Plains Regional Championship in the National Finals. In December 2007, the team clinched yet another state championship, and went on to compete in Washington D.C., where their Unit 2 was awarded a unit award. In April 2014 the team placed 10th in the nation in Washington DC.

Highland High school has a very diverse population, with students from many cultures and socio-economic backgrounds. Many foreign exchange students attend the school each year. The school has a strong International Students Club that produces an annual Multicultural Assembly that showcases performance arts from the various cultures represented at Highland and is performed by both students and staff members.

=== Athletics ===
Football was ranked #2 in the 2006 state tournament. Highland football earned an additional bid in the 2008 state playoffs. The boys' soccer team was ranked second and the girls' soccer team finished third in the 2007 5A State Tournament. The #3-ranked boys' basketball team finished as runner-up in the 2009 state championship. Also, in 2009, boys' basketball set a school record with a 26-win season. Highland Track held the state title in 2005. The cross-country team was ranked #2 in the state in 2005 and 2006. The boys' track-and-field team won the 2009 5A state championship. The girls' track-and-field team won the 2010 5A state championship. The Hornets have a total of 22 boys' track-and-field state championships.

HHS competes in the New Mexico Activities Association (NMAA) as a class 4A school in District 6. In 2018 NMAA realigned the state's schools into five classifications and adjusted district boundaries.

== In popular culture ==
A number of scenes in movies and TV shows have been filmed at Highland, including Spy School, the 2009 movie Carriers, ‘’ The Space Between Us’’ the pilot episode for Terminator: The Sarah Connor Chronicles. Highland is popular among producers due to the architecture of its main building, and due to the tax credits that the state of New Mexico has recently begun offering to movie producers.

For season three of the AMC series Breaking Bad, a scene was filmed inside the Highland gymnasium. A scene in the 2017 film Logan was also filmed there.

Daybreak was filmed through the 2018–2019 school year.

Highland High School is a common location in Beavis and Butt-head, being the school which Beavis and Butt-head attend, sometimes, as they often skip school. Series creator Mike Judge lived in Albuquerque, New Mexico during his high school years. Although he attended a private school, he lived in an area which would require him to go to Highland High School should he have attended public school in Albuquerque.

== Notable alumni ==
- Lorenzo Antonio – Latin pop singer
- Jarrod Baxter – football player for the Houston Texans and Arizona Cardinals
- Dewey Bohling – professional football halfback
- Cathy Carr – Olympic champion and former world record-holder in two events, including the long-course 100-meter breaststroke
- William T. Cooley (born 1966), Class of 1984 – major general in the United States Air Force
- Diane Dimond – television journalist and reporter
- James G. Ellis – dean of the Marshall School of Business
- Deb Haaland – Secretary of Interior under Joe Biden and former U.S. Representative; second Native American woman elected to the House
- Kim Jew – photographer and entrepreneur
- Tito Landrum – baseball player who played in MLB primarily as an outfielder from 1980 to 1988
- Doug Lawrence (jazz) - jazz saxophonist who has worked and recorded with Tony Bennett, Dizzy Gillespie, Aretha Franklin, Ray Charles, The Count Basie Orchestra, Billie Eilish and many others, including appearing on numerous Grammy winning and nominated recordings
- Gavin Maloof – businessman, owner of the Palms Hotel and Casino in Las Vegas
- Phillip Maloof – businessman, owner of the Palms Hotel and Casino in Las Vegas
- Marc Maron – stand-up comedian, actor
- Tommy McDonald – high school All-American, played football at Oklahoma University, Philadelphia Eagles wide receiver, National Football League Hall of Fame Inductee
- Bobby Newcombe – football player, formerly played for the Nebraska Cornhuskers, NFL's Arizona Cardinals and CFL's Montreal Alouettes
- Anicka Newell – pole vaulter
- Rod Nichols – baseball player who played in MLB with the Cleveland Indians, Los Angeles Dodgers, and Atlanta Braves
- Solomon Peña - Failed 2022 Republican candidate for the 14th district of the New Mexico House of Representatives who was arrested in 2023 for his alleged role in the shootings of several homes belonging to Democratic politicians in response to his loss
- Bart Prince – architect
- William F. Riordan – chief justice of the New Mexico Supreme Court
- Maggie Toulouse Oliver – Secretary of State of New Mexico
- Nick Wechsler – actor

== Gallery ==
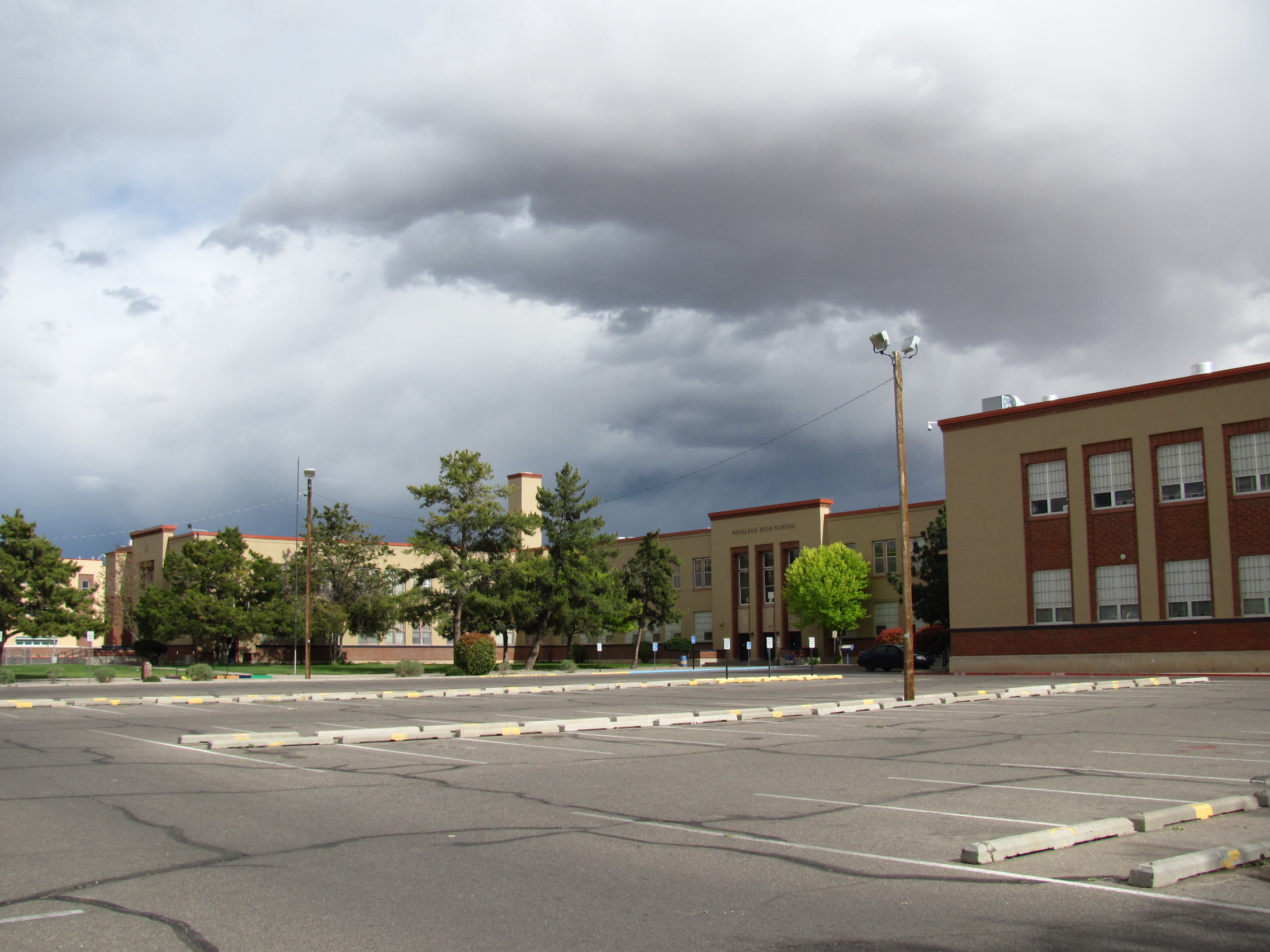
Main building

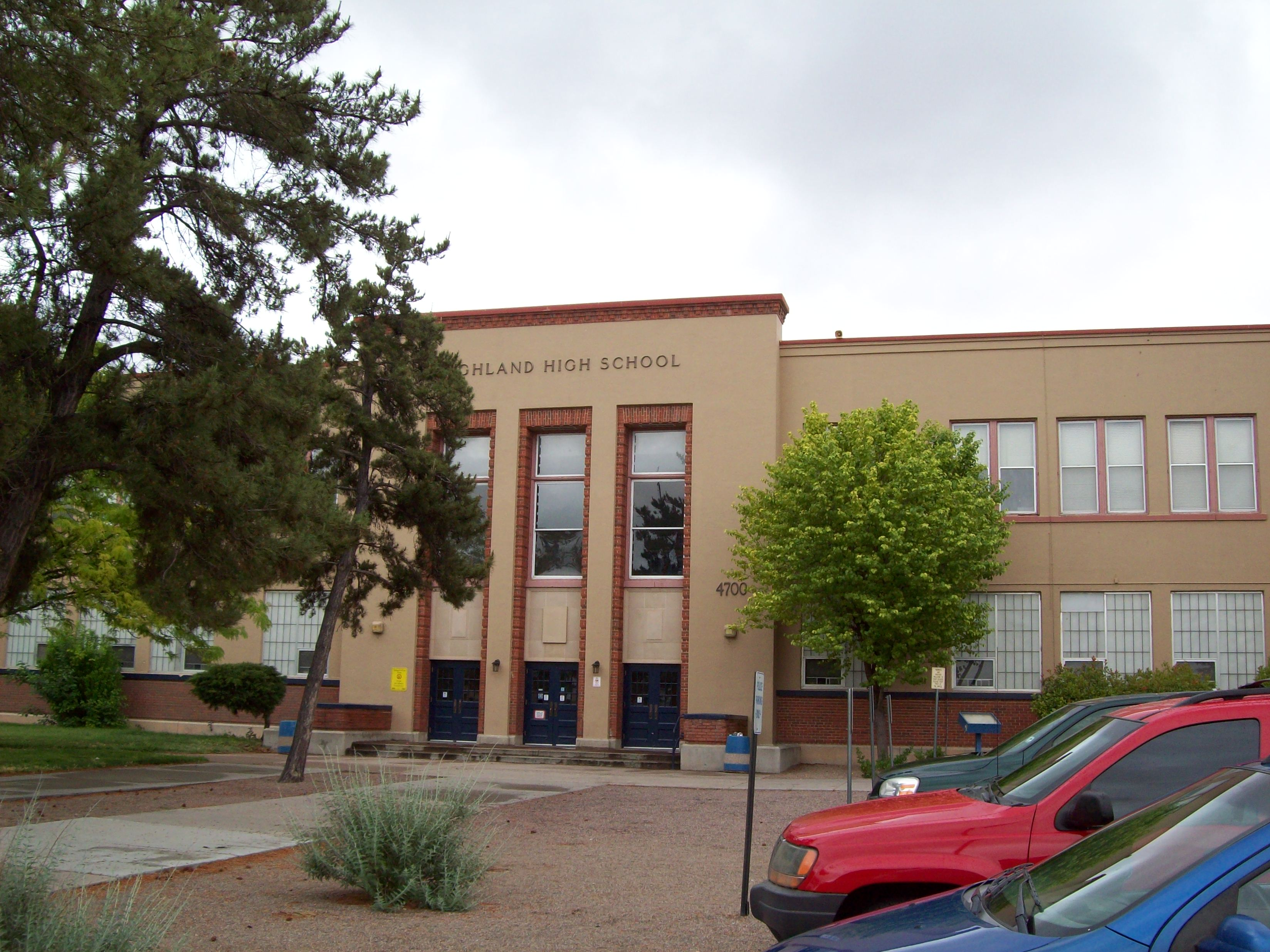
Main entrance
