= Kenneth Tolon II =

American football player (born 1981)

No. 26
- Position: Running back

Personal information
- Born: December 16, 1981 (age 44); Albuquerque, New Mexico, U.S.
- Listed height: 6 ft 1 in (1.85 m)
- Listed weight: 210 lb (95 kg)

Career information
- High school: Valley (Albuquerque, New Mexico)
- College: Stanford Cardinal (2001–2004)

Kenneth Tolon II (born December 16, 1981) is a former running back for the Stanford Cardinal. He played for Stanford from 2000 to 2004.

== Valley High School ==
While playing for Valley High School of Albuquerque, Tolon received first team all state honors. He was also an academic all-state honoree.
