= West Mesa murders =

Remains of women discovered near Albuquerque, New Mexico, US

- Location: Albuquerque to Rio Rancho, New Mexico, U.S.
- Date: 2003–2004 (possible 2001-2006)
- Target: Women and children
- Attack type: Serial killing
- Deaths: 11+
- Perpetrator: Unknown

The West Mesa Murders are the killings of eleven women whose remains were found buried in 2009 in the desert on the West Mesa of Albuquerque, New Mexico. Several suspects have been named, but none were arrested or charged. While the killings are believed to be the work of a serial killer, the involvement of a sex trafficking ring has also been suspected.

An anonymous tip to authorities at the Albuquerque Police Department and FBI linked the murders to a suspect from El Salvador. Police have also suspected the involvement of a sex trafficking ring operating through neighboring Texas that targets prostitutes during events throughout the Southwestern, Southern, and Western United States, especially regularly scheduled events, such as the New Mexico State Fair in this case, to take advantage of reliably heavier traffic. This trafficking ring is believed to operate in and around Las Vegas, El Paso, Killeen, and Denver.

== Background and discovery ==
Between 2001 and 2005, eleven women were buried by an unknown assailant dubbed the "Bone Collector" in an arroyo bank on Albuquerque's West Mesa, in an undeveloped area within city limits. Satellite imagery taken between 2003 and 2005 shows tire marks and patches of disturbed soil in the area where the remains were recovered. According to satellite photos, the last victim was buried in 2005. By 2006, development had encroached on the area, and soon after, the site was disturbed, buried, and platted for residential development.

Due to the 2008 housing bubble collapse, development on the West Side halted before housing could be built at the burial site. After neighbors complained of flooding at the platted site (due to the burial of the natural arroyo), the developer built a retaining wall to channel storm water to a retention pond built in the approximate area of the burial site, inadvertently exposing bones to the surface.

On February 2, 2009, a woman walking a dog found a human bone on the West Mesa and reported it to police. As a result of the subsequent police investigation, authorities discovered the remains of eleven women and girls, one woman being pregnant, buried in the area. They were between 15 and 32 years of age, most were Hispanic, and they were involved with drugs and sex work. Syllania Edwards, a 15-year-old runaway from Lawton, Oklahoma, was the only African American and the only victim from out of state. Michelle Valdez was four months pregnant at the time of her death.

=== Confirmed victims ===
The remains discovered in 2009 were identified as those of the following women and girls, all of whom disappeared between May 2003 and September 2004:

- Monica Diana Candelaria, 22, disappeared on May 15, 2003.
- Victoria Ann Chavez, 26, disappeared on June 5, 2003.
- Syllannia Terene Edwards, 15, disappeared on August 17, 2003.
- Doreen Marquez, 24, disappeared on October 10, 2003.
- Veronica Romero, 28, disappeared on February 14, 2004.
- Cousins Jamie Caterina Barela, 15, and Evelyn Jesus Maria Salazar, 27, both disappeared on March 26, 2004.
- Virginia Cloven, 24, disappeared on April 13, 2004.
- Julie Cyndie Nieto, 24, disappeared on July 15, 2004.
- Cinnamon Elks, 32, disappeared on August 20, 2004.
- Michelle Gina Valdez, 22, disappeared on September 22, 2004.

=== Possible victims ===
Prior to 2009, Detective Ida Lopez constructed a list of missing Albuquerque women with ties to prostitution and drug addiction who had gone missing between 2001 and 2006; ten were later found buried at West Mesa, although nine women with similar backgrounds remain missing, raising concern that there might be more victims:

- Darlene Marie Trujillo, 20, last seen on July 4, 2001.
- Martha Jo Lucher, 32, last seen on September 3, 2003.
- Anna Love Vigil, 20, last seen on January 21, 2005.
- Felipa Victoria Gonzales, 22, last seen on April 27, 2005.
- Nina Brenda Herron, 21, last seen on May 14, 2005.
- Jillian Elizabeth Henderson-Ortiz, 19, last seen on January 16, 2006.
- Shawntell Monique Waites, 29, last seen on March 15, 2006.
- Leah Rachelle Peebles, 23, last seen on May 5, 2006.
- Vanessa Reed, 24, last seen on June 13, 2006.

== Investigation ==
On December 9, 2010, Albuquerque police released six photos of seven other unidentified women who may also be linked to West Mesa. Police would not say how or where they had obtained the photos. Some of the women appeared to be unconscious, and many shared the same physical characteristics as the original eleven victims. The following day the police released an additional photograph of another woman; this woman was subsequently identified by family members, who reported that she had died of natural causes several years earlier. On December 13, 2010, police reported that two of the women in the photos had been identified as alive and could have valuable information if they could be located. In June 2018, more bones were found near the site of the burials, but these were later determined to be ancient and not related to the West Mesa murders.

== Suspects ==
West Mesa Bone Collector
- Penalty: Never sentenced

Details
- Victims: 11+
- Span of crimes: 2001–2005
- Country: United States
- State: New Mexico
- Date apprehended: Unapprehended

Police suspect that the bodies were all buried by the same person or persons and may be the work of a serial killer, who has since come to be referred to as the West Mesa Bone Collector. No official suspects have ever been named in connection with the murders. In 2010, a reward of up to $100,000 was being offered for information leading to the arrest and conviction of the person or persons responsible. Over time, a number of men have attracted police attention, though not named as full suspects, in connection with the murders. Fred Reynolds was a pimp who knew one of the missing women and reportedly had photos of missing sex workers; he died of natural causes in January 2009.

Lorenzo Montoya, a pressman at a local printer, lived less than three miles from the burial site. In 2006 there were reportedly dirt trails leading from his trailer park to the site. He had twice been arrested for violent attacks on sex workers and had threatened to kill his girlfriend and "bury her in lime". Co-workers said he had talked about killing women and burying them on the West Mesa. In December 2006, Montoya strangled 19-year-old sex worker Shericka Hill at his trailer and then was shot to death by the teen's boyfriend, Frederick Williams, as Montoya was trying to put her lifeless body into the trunk of his car. At the time, law enforcement said they did not believe this was the first time Montoya had killed someone, because the crime was "too brutal". It would appear the West Mesa killings stopped after his death.

While searching Montoya's home, detectives came across a home recording found on Montoya's camera; only a section of the video has been released to the public. According to police, the first part of the video shows Montoya having sex with an unidentified and possibly dead woman before fading to black and transitioning to show a wall and bed in the foreground. During this section of the video, noises can be heard that sound like Montoya tearing duct tape from a roll and opening a garbage bag. It has been theorized that this was Montoya preparing a body for disposal; screenshots of the unidentified woman have also been released in the hope she can be identified.

In August 2010, police searched several properties in Joplin, Missouri, associated with local photographer and businessman Ron Erwin in connection with the West Mesa cases. They confiscated "tens of thousands" of photos from the man, who reportedly used to visit the state fair in Albuquerque. Police confirmed that they had cleared Erwin as a suspect. In December 2010, convicted Colorado serial killer Scott Lee Kimball stated that he was being investigated for the West Mesa murders, but he denied killing the women.

In 2014, a breakthrough on a decades-old case caused Albuquerque police to become interested in Joseph Blea as a suspect for the murders. Blea has been dubbed the "Mid-School Rapist" for his activities in the 1980s; police say he would often break into the homes of 13- to 15-year-old girls who lived near McKinley Middle School in Albuquerque and rape them. In one case, there was a DNA sample but the rape test kit was not re-tested until 2010, eventually linking Blea to the rape. In 2015, Blea was also suspected by police of killing a sex worker; his DNA sample was located on the inner waistband and belt of a sex worker found dead on Central Ave, a notorious street for sex work in the eastern part of the city. In addition, a tree tag from a nursery was found in the area where the West Mesa victims' bodies were buried; it was tracked to a nursery Blea once frequented. Blea had women's underwear and jewellery not belonging to his wife or daughter in his home and allegedly told a cellmate that he had hired the West Mesa victims, who he called "trashy". Blea was sentenced to 90 years in 2015 for the Mid-School rape case.

In 2026, his granddaughter was convicted of first-degree kidnapping and involuntary manslaughter in Las Vegas. When questioned about posts in which she said she wanted to kill prostitutes and bury them in the desert, she dismissed them as a joke and referred to her grandfather, saying he "had killed several women" and "was actually a serial killer."

== Legacy ==
On June 27, 2020, a one-acre park named 'Women's Memorial Park' was opened by state officials on the site where the bodies were found to honor the women and their families.

== See also ==
- List of fugitives from justice who disappeared
- List of serial killers in the United States
- List of solved missing person cases (2000s)
