= Connor O'Toole (American football) =

American football player (born 2002)

No. 57 – Seattle Seahawks
- Position: Outside linebacker
- Roster status: Active

Personal information
- Born: August 27, 2002 (age 24); Albuquerque, New Mexico, U.S.
- Listed height: 6 ft 3 in (1.91 m)
- Listed weight: 248 lb (112 kg)

Career information
- High school: La Cueva (Albuquerque, New Mexico)
- College: Utah (2020–2024)
- NFL draft: 2025: undrafted

Career history
- Seattle Seahawks (2025–present)

Awards and highlights
- Super Bowl champion (LX)

Career NFL statistics as of 2025
- Total tackles: 5
- Fumble recoveries: 1
- Stats at Pro Football Reference

Connor O'Toole (born August 27, 2002) is an American professional football outside linebacker for the Seattle Seahawks of the National Football League (NFL). He played college football for the Utah Utes and was signed by the Seahawks as an undrafted free agent in 2025.

== Early life ==
O'Toole was born on August 27, 2002, in Albuquerque, New Mexico. He attended La Cueva High School where he competed in football and track and field. In football, he was a two-time first-team all-state selection at wide receiver, posting 867 receiving yards and eight touchdowns as a junior and then 683 receiving yards and eight touchdowns as a senior. He was the state champion in the 300 metres hurdles and was named the Metro Male Athlete of the Year by the Albuquerque Journal in 2018–19. A three-star recruit and the top prospect in the state, he committed to play college football for the Utah Utes.

== College career ==
O'Toole began his collegiate career as a wide receiver, redshirting at Utah in 2020. In 2021, he recorded one catch and posted 10 tackles on special teams. O'Toole changed his position to defensive end prior to the 2022 season. In his first season on defense, he posted 41 tackles, four tackles-for-loss (TFLs) and 1.5 sacks. O'Toole was hindered by injuries in his final two years at Utah. He recorded 31 tackles and 4.5 sacks in eight games in 2023 and then had 22 tackles and 2.5 sacks in eight games in 2024.

== Professional career ==
Pre-draft measurables
Height	Weight	Arm length	Hand span	Wingspan	40-yard dash	10-yard split	20-yard split	20-yard shuttle	Three-cone drill	Vertical jump	Broad jump
6 ft 3 3/8 in (1.91 m)	248 lb (112 kg)	32 1/2 in (0.83 m)	9 in (0.23 m)	6 ft 7 5/8 in (2.02 m)	4.66 s	1.63 s	2.70 s	4.30 s	7.06 s	37.5 in (0.95 m)	10 ft 1 in (3.07 m)
All values from Pro Day

After going unselected in the 2025 NFL draft, O'Toole signed with the Seattle Seahawks as an undrafted free agent. He recorded a sack and a team-leading nine pressures during preseason. Afterwards, it was announced he had made the team's 53-man roster for the 2025 season. The Seahawks went on to win Super Bowl LX in O'Toole's rookie season.
