= Vince Warren =

American football player (born 1963)

No. 83
- Position: Wide receiver

Personal information
- Born: February 18, 1963 (age 63); Little Rock, Arkansas, U.S.
- Listed height: 6 ft 0 in (1.83 m)
- Listed weight: 180 lb (82 kg)

Career information
- High school: Eldorado (Albuquerque, New Mexico)
- College: San Diego State (1981–1985)
- NFL draft: 1986: 5th round, 130th overall pick

Career history
- New York Giants (1986); Miami Dolphins (1988)*
- * Offseason or practice squad member only

Awards and highlights
- Second-team All-WAC (1984)
- Stats at Pro Football Reference

Vincent Leo Warren (born February 18, 1963) is an American former professional football wide receiver who played one season with the New York Giants of the National Football League (NFL). He was selected by the Giants in the fifth round of the 1986 NFL draft after playing college football at San Diego State University.

== Early life and college ==
Vincent Leo Warren was born on February 18, 1963, in Little Rock, Arkansas. He attended Eldorado High School in Albuquerque, New Mexico.

Warren played college football for the San Diego State Aztecs of San Diego State University from 1981 to 1985. He was a four-year letterman from 1982 to 1985. He caught two passes for 46 yards in 1981. eight passes for 120 yards and one touchdown in 1982, 28 passes for 594 yards and five touchdowns in 1983, 29 passes for 616 yards and three touchdowns in 1984, and 38 passes for 788 yards and five touchdowns in 1985.

== Professional career ==
Warren was selected by the New York Giants in the fifth round, with the 130th overall pick, of the 1986 NFL draft. He officially signed with the team on July 19. He was placed on injured reserve on September 2. Warren was activated on October 18 and played in four games for the Giants, before being released on November 15. On November 17, 1986, he signed a futures contract with the Giants for the 1987 season. Despite not being on the team's roster, Warren was awarded a Super Bowl ring when the Giants won Super Bowl XXI against the Denver Broncos. He was released by the Giants the next year on August 19, 1987.

Warren signed with the Miami Dolphins on January 6, 1988. He was released on August 15, 1988.

== Personal life ==
Warren was later a paramedic.
