= Charly Martin =

American football player (born 1984)

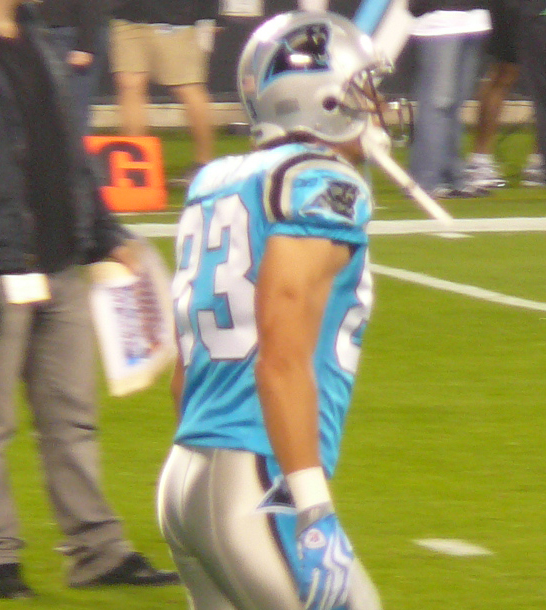
- Martin with the Carolina Panthers in 2009

No. 83, 14
- Position: Wide receiver

Personal information
- Born: March 20, 1984 (age 42); Walla Walla, Washington, U.S.
- Listed height: 6 ft 1 in (1.85 m)
- Listed weight: 212 lb (96 kg)

Career information
- High school: Farmington (NM) Piedra Vista
- College: West Texas A&M
- NFL draft: 2009: undrafted

Career history
- San Diego Chargers (2009)*; Carolina Panthers (2009−2010); Jacksonville Jaguars (2011)*; Seattle Seahawks (2012); San Francisco 49ers (2013)*; Jacksonville Jaguars (2013)*
- * Offseason or practice squad member only

Awards and highlights
- 3× First-team All-LSC (2006–2008); First-team Little All-American (2008); Second-team Little All-American (2006)

Career NFL statistics
- Receptions: 5
- Receiving yards: 48
- Stats at Pro Football Reference

Charly Martin (born March 20, 1984) is an American former professional football player who was a wide receiver in the National Football League (NFL). He was signed by the San Diego Chargers as an undrafted free agent in 2009. He played college football for the West Texas A&M Buffaloes.

Martin also played for the Carolina Panthers, Seattle Seahawks, San Francisco 49ers, and Jacksonville Jaguars.

== Professional career ==
=== San Diego Chargers (2009) ===
After going undrafted in the 2009 NFL draft, Martin signed with the San Diego Chargers as an undrafted free agent. He appeared in all four preseason games with the team in 2009, catching seven passes for 88 yards. The Chargers waived Martin during final cuts on September 5.

=== Carolina Panthers (2009−2010) ===
Martin was signed to the practice squad of the Carolina Panthers on September 9, 2009. He remained there during the first 10 weeks of the regular season before being promoted to the active roster on November 17 after offensive tackle Jordan Gross was placed on season-ending injured reserve.

=== Jacksonville Jaguars (2011) ===
He was signed to the Jacksonville Jaguars practice squad on December 2, 2011.

=== Seattle Seahawks (2012) ===
Martin was signed by the Seattle Seahawks on January 5, 2012. Martin appeared in each preseason game for the Seahawks in 2012, catching one pass for a touchdown on August 23 versus the Kansas City Chiefs. Martin was waived by the Seahawks on November 6, 2012 and re-signed to the practice squad on November 7, 2012. He was released on July 11, 2013 to make room for Kyle Nelson, who was picked up from waivers from the San Francisco 49ers.

=== San Francisco 49ers (2013) ===
On July 11, 2013, Martin was claimed off waivers by the San Francisco 49ers after being released by the Seattle Seahawks. He was waived on August 6, 2013, to make room for punter Colton Schmidt.

=== Jacksonville Jaguars (2013) ===
On August 7, 2013, Martin was claimed off waivers by the Jaguars. He was released by the Jaguars on August 30, 2013.
