= Eldorado High School (New Mexico) =

Public high school in Albuquerque, New Mexico

Coordinates: 35°07′44″N 106°30′46″W

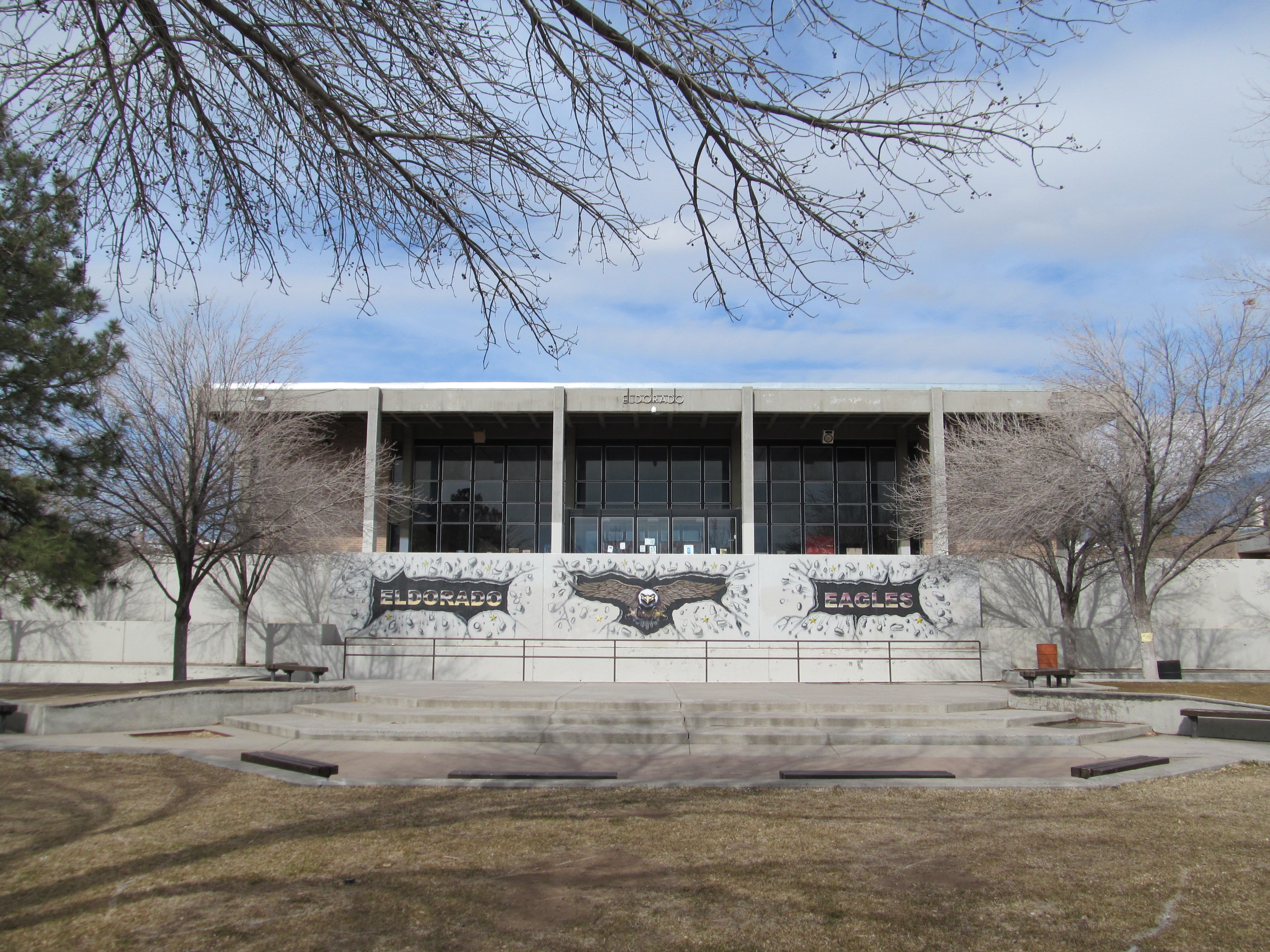
- 11300 Montgomery Blvd. NE; Albuquerque, New Mexico 87111; United States

Information
- Type: Public high school
- Established: 1973
- Principal: Juan Dominguez Torres
- Staff: 98.85 (FTE)
- Enrollment: 1,608 (2023–24)
- Student to teacher ratio: 16.27
- Colors: Texas Orange, Gold, White
- Athletics conference: NMAA, 5A Dist. 2
- Mascot: Golden Eagle
- Rival: La Cueva High School
- Website: eldorado.aps.edu

Eldorado High School is a public 9–12 high school located in northeast Albuquerque, New Mexico, in the Albuquerque Public Schools district.

== School grade ==
The NMPED (New Mexico Public Education department) replaced the No Child Left Behind Act and AYP testing with a new school grading formula, which took effect for the 2010–11 school years. The grade is calculated using many forms of testing, and includes graduation rates.

| School year | Grade from NMPED |
|---|---|
| 2010–11 | A |

== Athletics ==
Eldorado competes in the New Mexico Activities Association 5A-District 2, along with Farmington High School, La Cueva High School, Piedra Vista High School and West Mesa High School. Eldorado's mascot is the Golden Eagle and has nineteen teams participating in fourteen boys and girls sports; Eldorado's main rival is La Cueva High School.

== Band program ==
The Eldorado Highschool band program has been very notable for the marching arts in New Mexico. The program is composed of around 150 students with directors Stephen Snowden Jr and Jordan M. Sayre.

== Notable alumni ==
- Beth Coats, Olympic biathlete
- Daniel Crothers, Justice, North Dakota Supreme Court
- Trent Dimas, Olympic gold medalist
- Jim Everett, professional football player
- Daniel Faris, professional basketball player
- Zach Gentry, professional football player
- Brian Jay Jones, president of Biographers International Organization
- Ryan McGarvey, guitarist, singer, and songwriter
- James Mercer, musician and front man of The Shins
- Christian Parker (class of 1994), professional baseball player
- Jay Roach, film director
- Yvonne Sanchez, college basketball coach
- Devon Sandoval, professional soccer player
- Jorge Valenzuela, professional soccer player
- Vince Warren, Super Bowl champion
- Kyle Weiland, professional baseball player

== Popular culture ==
In 2007, the Albuquerque Journal revealed that the high school had been used for the filming of the first season of Breaking Bad.

The high school has been used by Netflix for the filming of Stranger Things season four. The first mention is in Episode 1, "The Hellfire club" as Lenora Hills High School.

The school was featured briefly in Better Call Saul during the season 6 episode “Breaking Bad.”
