= Ricky Siglar =

American football player (born 1966)

No. 63, 66, 71, 75, 72
- Position: Offensive tackle

Personal information
- Born: June 14, 1966 (age 60); Albuquerque, New Mexico, U.S.
- Listed height: 6 ft 7 in (2.01 m)
- Listed weight: 308 lb (140 kg)

Career information
- High school: Manzano (Albuquerque)
- College: San Jose State
- NFL draft: 1989: undrafted

Career history
- Dallas Cowboys (1989)*; San Francisco 49ers (1989–1990); Kansas City Chiefs (1993–1996); New Orleans Saints (1997); Carolina Panthers (1998); New Orleans Saints (1998); Kansas City Chiefs (1998)
- * Offseason or practice squad member only

Awards and highlights
- Super Bowl champion (XXIV)

Career NFL statistics
- Games played: 100
- Games started: 51
- Stats at Pro Football Reference

Ricky Allan Siglar (born June 14, 1966) is an American former professional football player who was an offensive tackle for four teams in the NFL. He played college football for the San Jose State Spartans and junior college football at Arizona Western College.
