= Nick Speegle =

American football player (born 1981)

No. 59, 56
- Position: Linebacker

Personal information
- Born: November 29, 1981 (age 44); Albuquerque, New Mexico, U.S.
- Listed height: 6 ft 6 in (1.98 m)
- Listed weight: 250 lb (113 kg)

Career information
- High school: La Cueva (Albuquerque)
- College: New Mexico
- NFL draft: 2005: 6th round, 176th overall pick

Career history
- Cleveland Browns (2005); San Diego Chargers (2006); Cleveland Browns (2006)

Awards and highlights
- First-team All-MW (2004)

Career NFL statistics
- Tackles: 10
- Fumble recoveries: 1
- Stats at Pro Football Reference

Nicholas David Speegle (born November 29, 1981) is an American former professional football player who was a linebacker for the Cleveland Browns of the National Football League (NFL) from 2005 to 2006. He played college football for the New Mexico Lobos.

== Early life ==
Speegle attended La Cueva High School in Albuquerque, New Mexico, and was a good student and a letterman in both football and track and field. As a senior, he was a first-team All-State defensive end and a second-team state tight end in football. In track and field, he won state and set school records in the 110-meter hurdles.

== College career ==
Speegle was a four-year starter at outside linebacker. He was a consistent defensive force after working his way into the starting lineup as a redshirt freshman. He was the 2004 team captain...never flashy but was a quiet playmaker throughout his career and the veteran leader of the Lobo defense in 2004. He was an incredibly tough player who never missed a game, battling through a number of painful injuries over the years. Fellow New Mexico linebackers described him as an old-school, classic type of LB in the mold of NFL Hall of Famers Ray Nitchke, Jack Lambert and Dick Butkus. Speegle was two-time Honorable-Mention All MWC selection before breaking through with First Team Honors his final season. He was named Third-team Freshman All-American by The Sporting News in 2001. He finished his career ranked No. 14 at UNM with 317 career tackles for loss and made 43 starts (including 42 straight to close his career). He was the total package of size, speed, strength, and attitude. He had good instincts and was an incredibly sure tackler. He added over 30 pounds after entering New Mexico at 207. He graduated in May 2004, with a degree in General Management and a 3.97 cumulative GPA. He played his senior year as a graduate student, pursuing his master's degree in Sports Administration. He was a two-time First-team Academic All-District selection, two-time MWC Scholar-Athlete Award winner, an Academic All-MWC Honoree all four years, and was awarded for his community service by being named to the 2004 American Football Coaches Association National Good Works Team. (clevelandbrowns.com, 2005)

== Professional career ==
NFL Combine

- Height: 6 feet, 6 inches
- Weight: 242 pounds
- Bench press: 390 pounds
- Squat: 465 pounds

Speegle was selected by the Cleveland Browns in the sixth round of the 2005 NFL draft as the 176th pick overall. He played two seasons as a linebacker and on special teams with the Browns and San Diego Chargers before suffering a career-ending back injury.
