= Piedra Vista High School =

Coordinates: 36°46′44″N 108°09′32″W

Location
- 5700 College Blvd. Farmington, New Mexico 87402; United States

Information
- School type: Public, high school
- Founded: 1998
- Principal: Kevin Beckner
- Teaching staff: 82.35 (FTE)
- Enrollment: 1,591 (2023–2024)
  - Grade 9: 426
  - Grade 10: 432
  - Grade 11: 374
  - Grade 12: 359
- Student to teacher ratio: 19.32
- Campus: Suburban
- Colors: Navy, silver, and black
- Athletics conference: NMAA; AAAAAA District 1
- Mascot: Panther
- Yearbook: The Rock
- Website: pvhs.farmingtonschools.us

Piedra Vista High School (PVHS) is a public high school in Farmington, New Mexico, founded in 1998. It is part of the Farmington Municipal School District.

PVHS is one of four high schools in Farmington and is located on the city's northeast side. The other high schools are Farmington High School, San Juan College High School, and Rocinante High School. PVHS' mascot is the Black Panther and its colors are navy blue, silver, and black. The two schools share Hutchison Stadium, located at Farmington High School, for home football games. Piedra Vista varsity baseball games are played at Ricketts Park in Farmington.

== Athletics and arts ==
Piedra Vista High School is part of NMAA AAAA District 1. It has 16 athletic teams, in accordance with Title IX.

Fall	Boys' soccer, girls' soccer, volleyball, football, cross country, golf
Winter	Girls' basketball, boys' basketball, bowling, wrestling, swimming/diving
Spring	Baseball, softball, track, golf, tennis

State championships	Class	Year
Baseball	4A	2010, 2011, 2012, 2014
Softball	4A	2006, 2007, 2008, 2009, 2010, 2011, 2012, 2013, 2014
Boys' track & field	4A	2013
Bowling	4A	2009, 2013
Bowling	5A	2015
Choir	4A	2008, 2009, 2010, 2011, 2012, 2013, 2014,2016,2018,2019
Band	3A	2011
Girls' golf	4A	2004, 2008
Drama	4A	2002, 2003, 2021
Girls' track and field	5A	2016
Wrestling	4A	2011, 2012, 2013, 2014
Wrestling	5A	2015, 2020

== Notable alumni ==
- Charly Martin, NFL wide receiver
- Chase Silseth, MLB pitcher
