= West Mesa High School =

High School in Albuquerque, New Mexico

Coordinates: 35°05′45″N 106°42′55″W

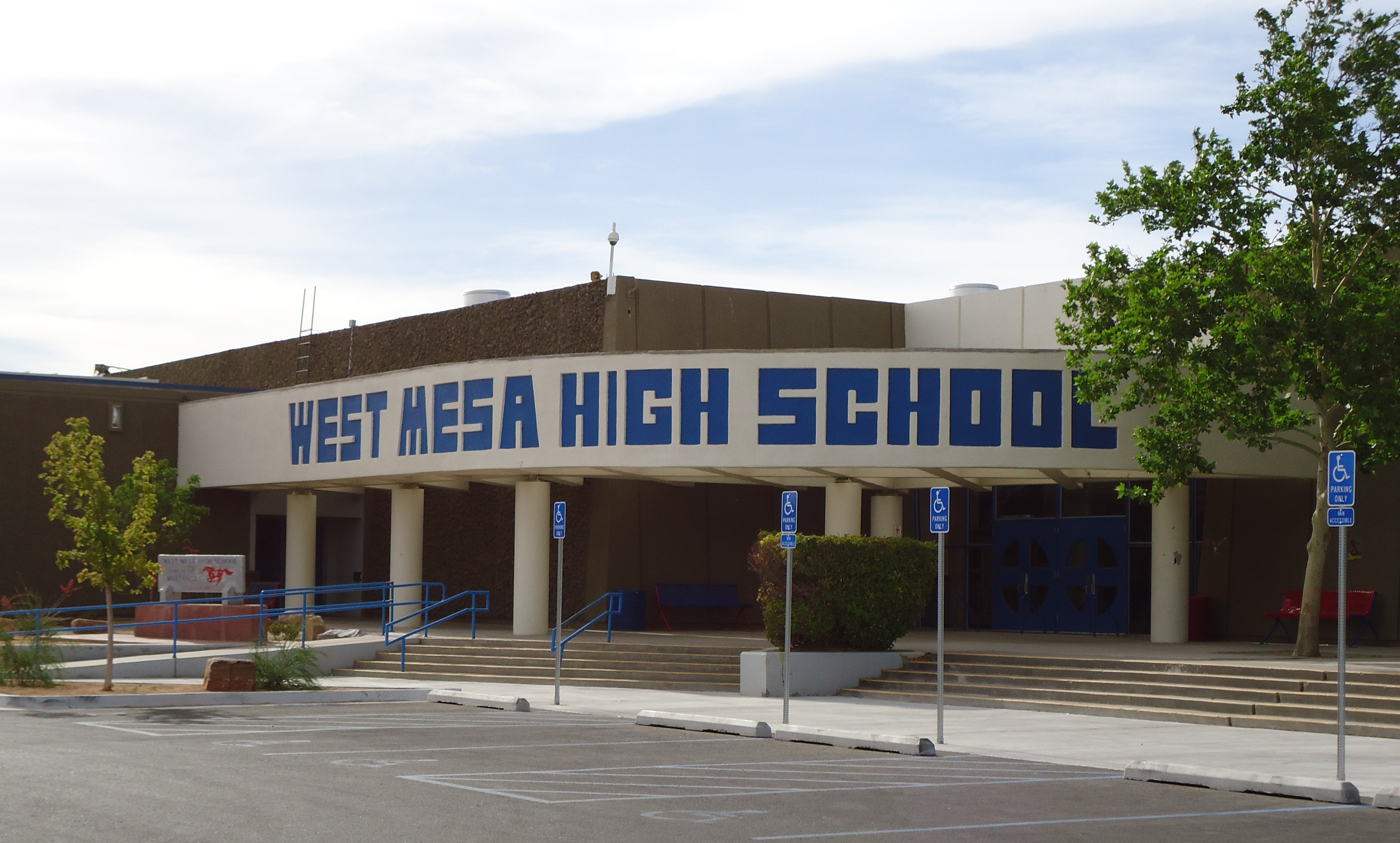
- Main entrance

Location
- 6701 Fortuna Rd. NW; Albuquerque, New Mexico 87121; United States

Information
- Type: Public high school
- Motto: Knowledge Today, Success Tomorrow!
- Established: 1966
- Principal: Michele Torres
- Staff: 105.65 (FTE)
- Enrollment: 1,612 (2023-2024)
- Student to teacher ratio: 15.26
- Campus: Suburban
- Colors: Scarlet; Royal Blue; White
- Athletics conference: NMAA, 6A Dist. 5
- Mascot: Mustang
- Rival: Rio Grande High; Atrisco Heritage High; Valley High; Albuquerque High
- Yearbook: El Espiritu
- Website: https://westmesa.aps.edu

West Mesa High School (WMHS) is a Public School in Albuquerque, New Mexico, located on the west side of the city (West Mesa). It is a part of Albuquerque Public Schools. The school colors are scarlet, royal blue and white, and their mascot is the Mustang.

== Academics ==
=== Student body statistics ===
Ethnicity	This school	State average
White (not Hispanic)	19%	29%
Hispanic (of any race)	69%	56%
American Indian/Alaskan Native	7%	11%
African American	4%	3%
Pacific Islander	1%	1%

== Films shot on Campus ==
- The 1971 drama Making It was filmed in the summer of 1970.
- The 2008 comedy Hamlet 2 was filmed from September through October 2007.
- The 2011 musical drama Lemonade Mouth was filmed in the spring of 2010.

== Athletics ==
WMHS competes in the New Mexico Activities Association (NMAA), as a class 6A school in District 5. In 2014, the NMAA realigned the state's schools into six classifications and adjusted district boundaries. In addition to West Mesa High School, the schools in District 5-6A include: Albuquerque High School, Rio Grande High School, Valley High School and Atrisco Heritage Academy High School.

WMHS has captured 12 State Championships, most in AAAA.

State Championships
Season	Sport	Number of Championships	Year
Fall	Volleyball	6	1992, 1990, 1989, 1988, 1985, 1984
Winter	Wrestling	4	1999, 1994, 1991, 1990
Spring	Softball	1	2004
Spring	Boys Track and Field	1	1986
Total		12	

== Notable alumni ==
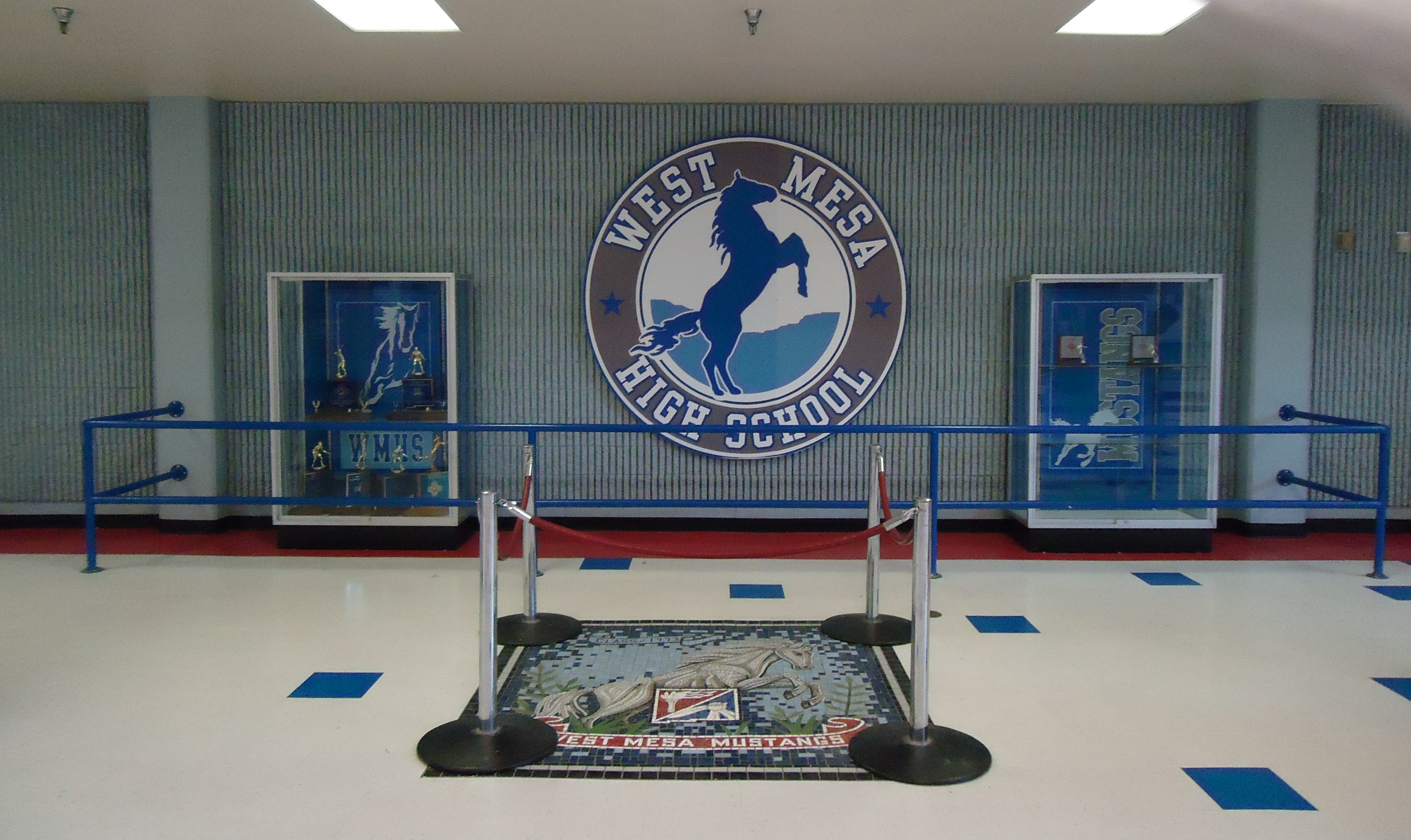
The entryway to the gymnasium at West Mesa

- Randy Castillo (1968), rock drummer
- Jordan Espinosa, mixed martial artist
- Mary Herrera, New Mexico Secretary of State
- Sandy R. Jones, former member of the New Mexico Public Regulation Commission
- Damacio Page, mixed martial artist
- Steven Michael Quezada (1981), actor, writer, producer, comedian, and politician
- Al Unser Jr. (1980), race car driver
- Joey Villasenor (attended) mixed martial artist
