= Atrisco Land Grant =

1692 Spanish land grant in New Mexico

The Atrisco Land Grant (merced) of 1692 is one among many Spanish land grants in New Mexico. It is in the Atrisco Valley (Valle de Atrisco) south of Albuquerque, New Mexico. The grant was established during the New World expansion of the Spanish Empire, as part of the Viceroyalty of New Spain (Nueva España).

The Atrisco land was given to individuals who intended to found a settlement. Other grants were made to individuals, or to communal groups establishing settlements, or to Pueblo peoples for communal lands that they already occupied, such as the Pueblos of Sandia to the north of Atrisco, and Isleta to the south. Other nearby land grants included the Elena Gallegos to the east, created in 1694 for Diego Montoya, it has developed as northern Albuquerque. The Alameda was granted in 1710 to Francisco Montes Vigil to the north and extends west of the Rio Grande; the Carnuel was granted to the residents of Cañon de Carnué (Tijeras Canyon) to the east; and the Pajarito to people in the south. In the 18th century, the Crown granted land to genízaros, at the request of missionaries.

Many land grants were also made by Mexico following its independence from Spain in 1821 following the Mexican War of Independence. Many land grant claims were challenged after the United States took over the territory in 1846 and grantees in New Mexico eventually lost 98 percent of their land, mostly to Anglo speculators. Some achieved legal ownership of their land under US authority. In the late 20th century, heirs to grantees of the Atrisco Grant voted to set up a company to manage their land grants together as stockholders. It is one of the few areas of metropolitan Albuquerque that has the potential for development, as the city in other directions is limited by natural features.

== History through 19th century ==
In 1598 under order of King Philip II of Spain, Don Juan de Oñate traveled northward on El Camino Real de Tierra Adentro (based on a Native American trail used by various cultures from the earliest of times) fording the Rio Grande, or Río del Norte, at the present-day El Paso. He claimed all of the northern frontier beyond the river for colonization by Spain. By the early 1600s, Spanish agricultural units dotted the 27 miles of previously unsettled Rio Grande Valley between the Sandia and Isleta pueblos. In 1632 a Spanish settlement had developed at the site of present-day Old Town in Albuquerque. In 1706 the Villa de Albuquerque was established, to include a presidio (military garrison).

The Pueblo Revolt of 1680 resulted in the expulsion of Spanish settlers from the area south to El Paso. In 1688 Diego de Vargas was appointed Spanish Governor of the New Spain territory of Santa Fe de Nuevo México and arrived to assume his duties in 1691. With a converted Zia war captain, Bartolomé de Ojeda, one hundred Indian auxiliaries, sixty soldiers, seven cannons, and a Franciscan priest, he recaptured Santa Fe in 1692; he convinced the Native Americans to accept clemency and protection in exchange for sworn allegiance. He had taken 12 other towns in a similar manner and proclaimed a formal act of repossession to complete the "bloodless" Reconquest (Reconquista). Although two more major uprisings occurred, including the Second Pueblo Revolt attempt of 1696, the Spanish had regained control of their settlements.

Fernando Duran y Chaves II was one of the New Mexicans of the volunteer army in this successful campaign. In 1692 he was granted land in the Albuquerque area by de Vargas, on the condition that he personally settle it, as well as developing it with other settlers. The grant totaled 41,533 acres extending west of the Rio Grande, in the area where Fernando's father Don Pedro had lived prior to the Pueblo Revolt. Having met the conditions of the grant, Durán y Chaves gained formal possession of the land in 1703. In 1768, the land grant was expanded by 25,958 acres further west and over the escarpment to the Rio Puerco, in order to accommodate the increasing Atrisco population, now greater than 200.

Due to Apache and Navajo attacks, the settlers were limited in land they could use for grazing. The Atrisqueños were forced to stay near the Río Grande valley until the later nineteenth century. With the United States, defeat of the Navajo at Armijo Lake in 1864, the security of the expanded pasture lands was finally achieved.

At the close of the Mexican–American War in 1848, the Treaty of Guadalupe Hidalgo was signed, and New Mexico officially became a territory of the United States. Article VIII of the Treaty honored existing land grants, ensuring the property rights of Mexican citizens living in the transferred territories. However, despite these assurances, through interpretation and modifications of the Treaty, United States officials often failed to honor the property rights of Mexican citizens. In 1854 the U.S. Congress established the office of the Surveyor General of New Mexico to ascertain "the origin, nature, character, and extent to all claims to lands under the laws, usages, and customs of Spain and Mexico." In 1886 surveyor general George Washington Julian recommended approval of the Atrisco grant claims submitted by lawyers representing 150 Atrisco residents. But in 1887, the Commissioner of the United States General Land Office of the Department of the Interior rejected the request, citing an incomplete listing of legal heirs, lack of evidence for both the original grant and for the continued occupation of the lands, and insufficiency of boundary details.

Congress had tried to deal with each New Mexico land grant by special bill, and the House had formed a Committee on Private Land Claims, seats on which were sought as a way of dispensing patronage. By 1880 the corruption inherent in determining these claims by politics rather than on a legal basis forced an end to this practice.

The United States Court of Private Land Claims was created in 1891 to adjudicate the land claims under the Treaty of Guadalupe Hidalgo. In its 13 years of adjudication, the court confirmed the land claimants in only 82 of 282 New Mexico cases; 90% of the land claimed in 300 total cases was taken away by the courts from claimants. But, some of the Atrisqueños did gain permanent possession of their land under this process. They formed a community land grant corporation in 1892, known as the Town of Atrisco, made up of the 225 heirs. Both Atrisco land grants were confirmed in 1894 by the United States Court of Private Land Claims.

== 20th century to present ==
In 1935 James M. Hubbell filed suit to determine all legal heirs for respective benefits and entitled shares of the land grant corporation. As assigned, the court-appointed referee J. G. Whitehouse compiled a list of present heirs and respective fractional "shares" based upon the corrected list of the original incorporators for the Town of Atrisco. His report was filed in 1936 and approved by the district court judge. Later, other petitions were made, which required supplementary reports and amendments. The last petition under James M. Hubbell v. Town of Atrisco was settled in 1952.

In 1967 Westland Development Co. Inc. was formed to represent the interests of the land grant heirs as stockholders. It submitted the articles of incorporation and bylaws to a mass meeting of the heirs, who voted 583 to 528 in its favor. The Board of Trustees of the Town of Atrisco refused to transfer title to grant lands to the company until overruled in 1969 by the Supreme Court of New Mexico.

The company foresees that the land will be very profitable for its stockholders in the future since it is one of the few areas that can be developed. Albuquerque is restricted from growth to the north and south by Pueblo lands, and by mountains to the east. In 1990, Barbara Page (Gallegos), president and chief executive officer of Westland, stated that, "We're going to be a very aggressive developer in the west end of the city."
