= New Mexico Activities Association =

- Abbreviation: NMAA
- Formation: 1921
- Type: Volunteer; NPO
- Legal status: Association
- Purpose: Athletic/educational
- Headquarters: 6600 Palomas NE; Albuquerque, NM 87109
- Region served: New Mexico
- Members: 150+ high schools
- Executive director: Dusty Young
- Affiliations: National Federation of State High School Associations
- Staff: 13
- Website: nmact.org
- Remarks: (505) 923-3110

The New Mexico Activities Association (NMAA) is a nonprofit organization that regulates interscholastic programs for junior and senior high schools in the U.S. state of New Mexico. It hosts the statewide sports championship games each year.

...one governing body remains consistently powerful and controversial. That body is a relatively unknown source of school policy in New Mexico—the New Mexico Activities Association.

— David L. Colton and Luciano Baca (2006)

== History ==
NMAA was organized in 1921 by John Milne, James Bickley, F. H. Lynn, and J. D. Shinkle as the New Mexico High School Athletic Association. In 1953 it began adding non-athletic activities and changed its name to New Mexico High School Activities Association. It continued to broaden its coverage and in 1961 changed its name to the present New Mexico Activities Association. The Hall of Pride and Honor was opened in 1992.

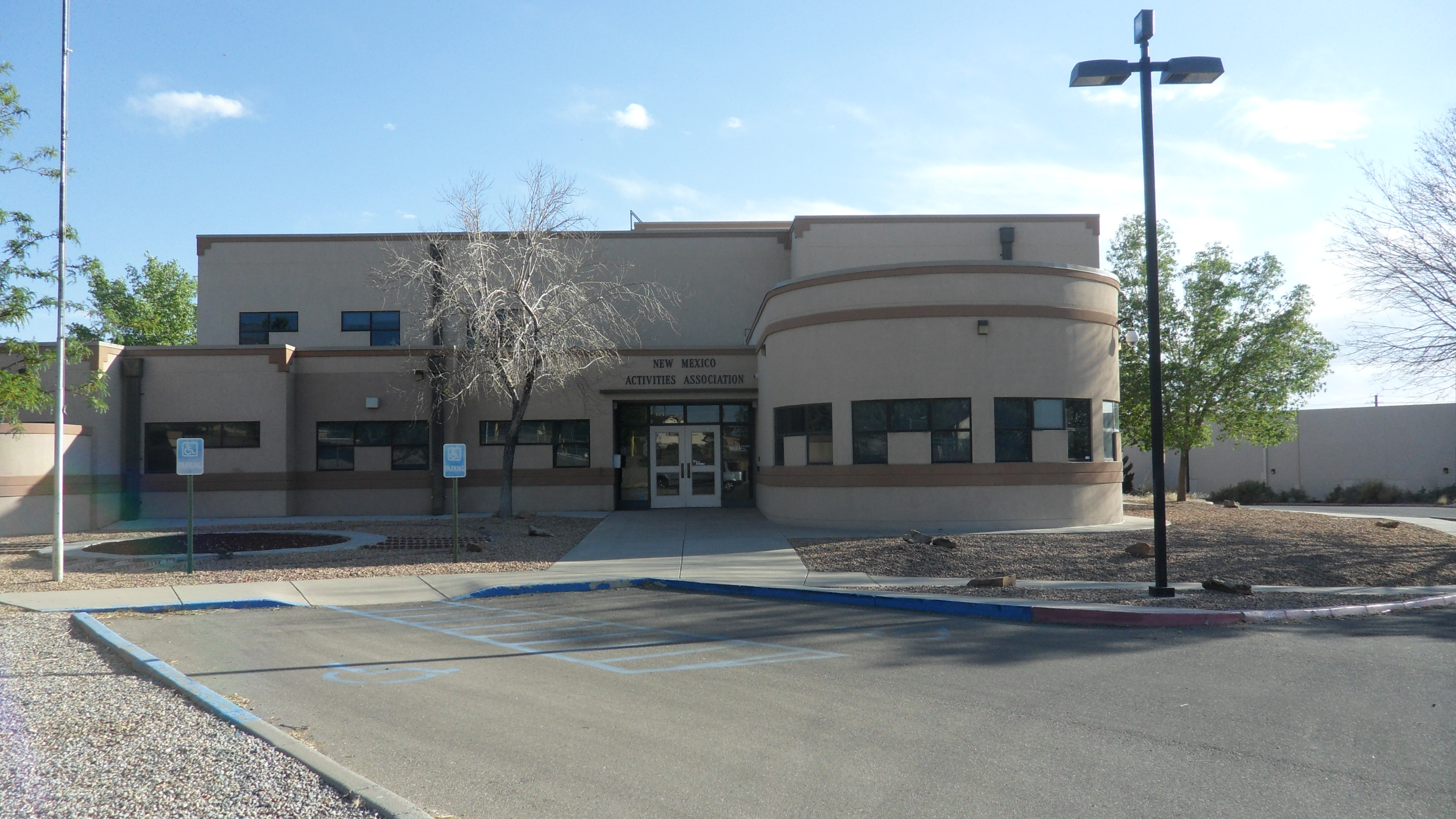
Offices of the NMAA

== Scope, membership, and governance ==
NMAA was incorporated as a New Mexico nonprofit corporation in 1964. In 1997 there was a major restructuring, with the Board of Directors replacing the executive committee as the governing body. The present executive director, Sally Marquez, took office in 2012.

Even though NMAA is a private organization, it is regulated to some extent by the State of New Mexico. New Mexico law (NMSA 1978 22-2-2L) gives the Public Education Department authority over "an association or organization attempting to regulate a public school activity", giving it authority to approve or disapprove rules and to require performance and financial audits, and requiring the organizations to comply with New Mexico's Open Meetings Act and its Public Records Act.

Membership in NMAA is open to public, private and parochial middle/junior high and senior high schools in New Mexico. As of late 2008, NMAA had 187 member middle schools and junior high schools and 163 member high schools. A list of member high schools is available.

NMAA is a member of the National Federation of State High School Associations.

Total revenue for the year ending June 30, 2007 was $3,961,100. NMAA claims to be a national leader in corporate development (that is, attracting sponsorships). In 1998 NMAA was reported to have multi-year sponsorship agreements with 50 firms, bringing in $100 to $35,000 per firm. In 2007, NMAA was reported to have increased its sponsorship revenue from $27,000 to $700,000 over the previous four years. As of late 2008, the NMAA web site listed 31 corporate sponsors.

=== Sanctioned activities ===
NMAA-sanctioned athletics are baseball, basketball, cross country, football, golf, powerlifting, soccer, softball, swimming & diving, tennis, track and field, volleyball, wrestling, spirit (cheerleading and drill team),

NMAA-sanctioned non-athletic activities are Athletic Training Challenge, bowling, Business Professionals of America, chess, choir, Concert Band, Marching Band, DECA Marketing Education, drama / one act play, English Expo, Family, Career, and Community Leaders of America, FFA Agriculture Education, Health Occupations Students of America, Junior Reserve Officers' Training Corps, mock trial, Rodeo, scholastic publications, science fair, Science Olympiad, SkillsUSA, speech and debate, student council, Technology Student Association. Not all of these are competitive.

=== Athletic alignment and classification ===
The NMAA divides school sports into classes by geographic location ("District") and by enrollment ("Class"). An example is 5-3A, meaning District 5 and Class AAA. The number of districts varies by sport. A school may choose to compete in a higher class than its enrollment would indicate. Thus, a particular school may be in different districts and classes in different sports. For example, in 2008 Albuquerque Academy is in District 5-4A for most sports, but is in District 4-3A for football. Menaul School is in District 6-1A in most sports, District 1-8M (an eight-man division) in football, and District 1-1A/3A in golf (which combines the 1A, 2A and 3A classes). A complete listing of alignment and classification is available. In December 2008 NMAA issued a proposed revised schedule of alignment and classification.

== Awards and honors ==
The NMAA Hall of Pride and Honor is located in the NMAA building in Albuquerque. It includes the NMAA Hall of Fame, the New Mexico High School Coaches Association Hall of Honor, the New Mexico Officials Association Hall of Fame, and a hall of the persons from New Mexico who have been inducted in the National Federation of State High School Associations Hall of Fame.

The NMAA Foundation was founded in 2007. It raises funds and awards scholarships to individuals and grants to school programs in the activities sanctioned by NMAA.

== State championships ==
NMAA hosts the tournaments that determine the statewide champions in 13 different sports.

=== Schools with most team titles ===
Rank	No. of titles	School	City	No. of boys' titles	No. of girls' titles	First	Last
1	187	Albuquerque Academy	Albuquerque	124	63	1968	2021
2	109	La Cueva High School	Albuquerque	63	46	1987	2016
3	99	Los Alamos High School	Los Alamos	39	60	1965	2015
4	82	Eldorado High School	Albuquerque	29	53	1975	2015
5	68	Carlsbad High School	Carlsbad	44	24	1930	2012
6	65	St. Michael's High School	Santa Fe	30	35	1940	2016
7	64	Hope Christian School	Albuquerque	27	37	1981	2016
7	64	Highland High School	Albuquerque	59	5	1951	2010
9	62	Albuquerque High School	Albuquerque	55	7	1921	2016
10	61	Lovington High School	Lovington	46	15	1949	2013
11	59	St. Pius X High School	Albuquerque	39	20	1963	2015
12	58	Artesia High School	Artesia	45	13	1957	2015
13	56	Fort Sumner High School	Fort Sumner	28	28	1955	2016
14	54	Farmington High School	Farmington	30	24	1952	2015
15	53	Goddard High School	Roswell	25	28	1967	2013
16	47	Hobbs High School	Hobbs	39	8	1938	2015
17	46	Jal High School	Jal	33	13	1959	2011
18	45	Las Cruces High School	Las Cruces	30	15	1941	2016
18	45	Sandia High School	Albuquerque	24	21	1960	2013
20	42	Eunice High School	Eunice	40	2	1954	2016
20	42	Roswell High School	Roswell	21	21	1926	2016
20	42	Texico High School	Texico	15	27	1973	2016
23	40	Gallup High School	Gallup	19	21	1953	2011
