= Wool Warehouse (Albuquerque, New Mexico) =

- New Mexico–Arizona Wool Warehouse
- U.S. National Register of Historic Places
- NM State Register of Cultural Properties
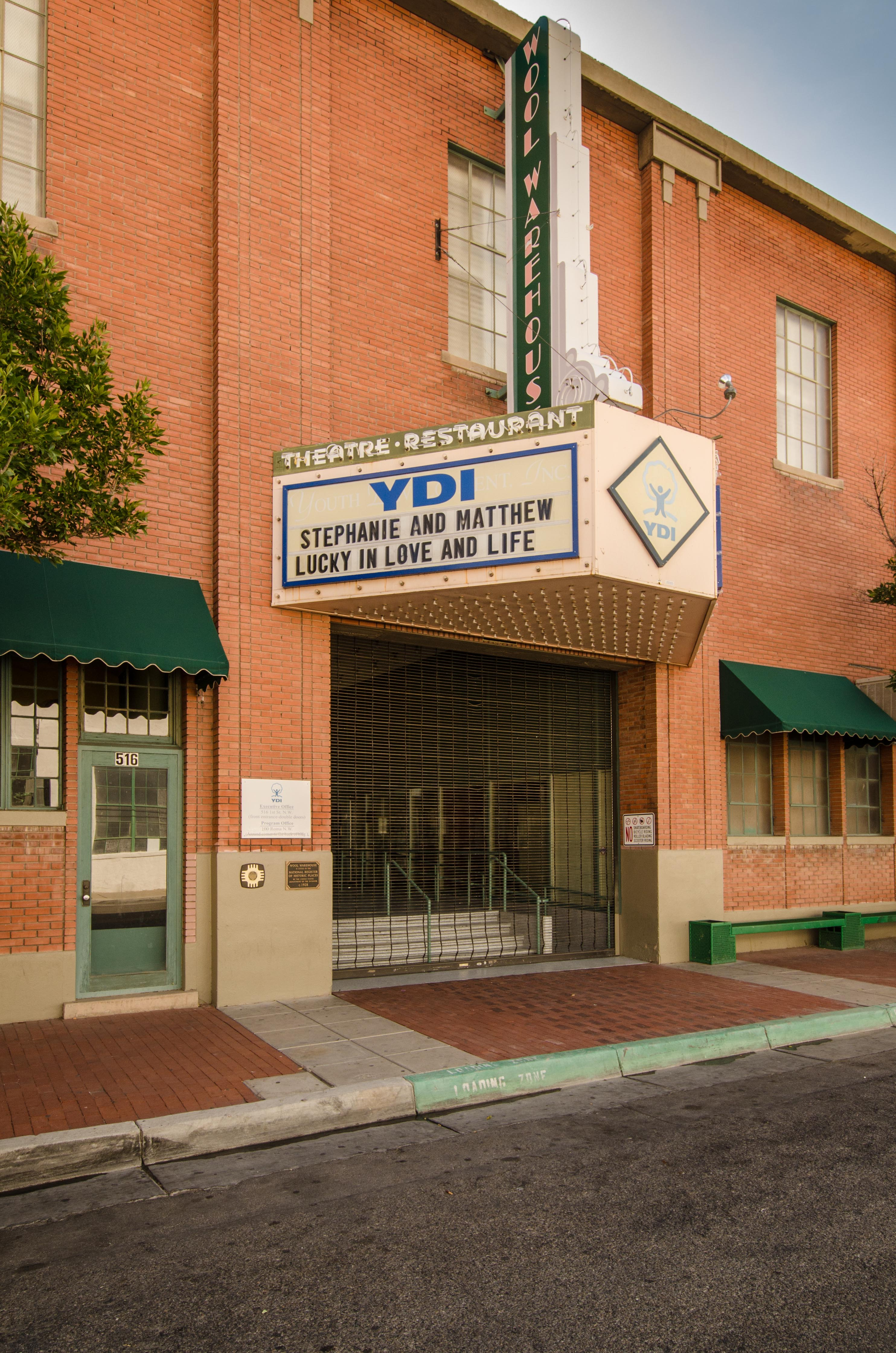
- Location: 520 1st St. NW, Albuquerque, New Mexico
- Coordinates: 35°5′19″N 106°38′48″W
- Built: 1929
- Architect: T. Charles Gaastra
- NRHP reference No.: 81000400
- NMSRCP No.: 787

Significant dates
- Added to NRHP: July 23, 1981
- Designated NMSRCP: October 31, 1980

The Wool Warehouse (originally known as the New Mexico–Arizona Wool Warehouse) is a historic building in the Warehouse District of downtown Albuquerque, New Mexico. Built in 1928–29 by wool merchant Frank Bond, the warehouse is significant for its role in New Mexico's wool industry in the mid-20th century. It was added to the New Mexico State Register of Cultural Properties in 1980 and the National Register of Historic Places in 1981.

== History ==
Albuquerque's central location and convenient access to the AT&SF Railway made it the hub of the New Mexico wool trade, which flourished as American demand for wool increased rapidly after World War I. The growing prominence of this industry was reflected in the Wool Warehouse, which was completed in 1929. Capable of storing five million pounds of wool and hides, the building also housed the offices of the Bond-McRae wool trading company, the Wool Warehouse Company, and the New Mexico Cooperative Wool Marketing Association. Bond was the president of the former two companies, both of which were taken over by his son in 1936.

Beginning in the 1940s, wool production in New Mexico began to decline. This was due to a variety of factors including limited availability of land for grazing and the rapidly growing popularity of synthetic fabrics. Faced with dwindling sales, the Wool Marketing Association shut down in 1959 and the warehouse itself eventually followed suit in 1972. In 1985, the building was remodeled at a cost of $2.5 million to house a theater and restaurant. Since 1994 it has been owned by Youth Development, Inc., a local nonprofit, and has been used sporadically for concerts, dances, and other events.

== Architecture ==
The Wool Warehouse was designed by Albuquerque architect T. Charles Gaastra, who also designed the Monte Vista School and the Hendren Building, among others. The warehouse is a two-story red brick structure with 40,000 square feet (3,700 m^{2}) of total space. The interior of the building shows an Egyptian influence, most notably in the design of the 36 supporting columns.
