= Martineztown-Santa Barbara =

- Neighborhood of Albuquerque
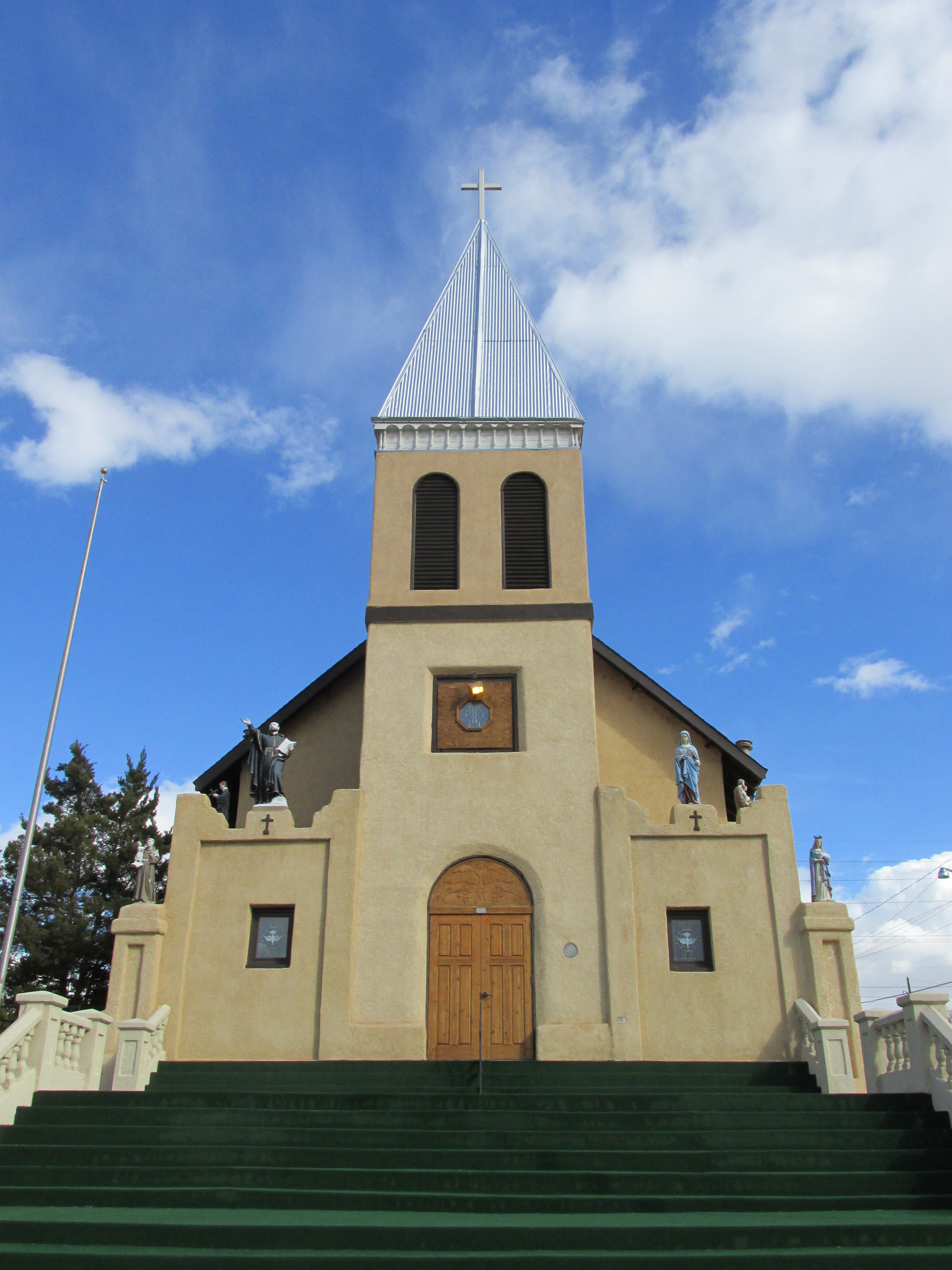
- San Ignacio Church
- Interactive map of Martineztown-Santa Barbara
- Coordinates: 35°5′55″N 106°38′20″W

Government
  - City Council: Isaac Benton
  - State House: Gail Chasey (D); Javier Martínez (D)
  - State Senate: Bill O'Neill (D); Jerry Ortiz y Pino (D)
  - U.S. House: Melanie Stansbury (D)

Area
  - Total: 1.06 sq mi (2.7 km^{2})

Population (2010)
  - Total: 2,716
  - Density: 2,565/sq mi (990/km^{2})
- ZIP Code: 87102
- Area code: 505

Martineztown-Santa Barbara is a neighborhood in central Albuquerque, New Mexico, immediately northeast of Downtown. Originating as a small farming village in the 1850s, it is one of the city's oldest neighborhoods and retains a distinct character, with winding streets, irregular lots, and adobe vernacular buildings reminiscent of other old Hispanic communities in northern New Mexico.

== Name ==
Historically, Martineztown and Santa Barbara were separate communities, though today they are generally considered to form a single neighborhood. Martineztown is named for its founding settlers, the Martín family, possibly via an Anglicization of Los Martines. Prior to becoming known by its present name, the area was usually referred to as "Dog Town". Santa Barbara is named for the Santa Barbara Cemetery, which still exists as part of Mount Calvary Cemetery.

== Geography ==
Santa Barbara-Martineztown is bounded by Dr. Martin Luther King Jr. Avenue, the Burlington Northern Santa Fe railroad tracks, Menaul Boulevard, and Interstate 25. Interstate 40 runs through the northern part of the neighborhood on an elevated viaduct, intersecting I-25 at the Big I. Historically, the neighborhood's main axis was Edith Boulevard; Broadway Boulevard is the other major north-south route and separates the residential part of the neighborhood from the warehouse district adjacent to the railroad tracks. The main east-west arterials are Lomas Boulevard, Mountain Road, and Odelia Road. The northeastern part of the neighborhood includes two large cemeteries as well as Albuquerque High School, while several blocks in the southeast corner are occupied by Lovelace Medical Center. The neighborhood's terrain consists of rolling sandhills leading up to the East Mesa.

== Demographics ==
As of the 2010 Census, Martineztown-Santa Barbara had a total population of 2,716 and 65% of the population was Hispanic or Latino.

== History ==
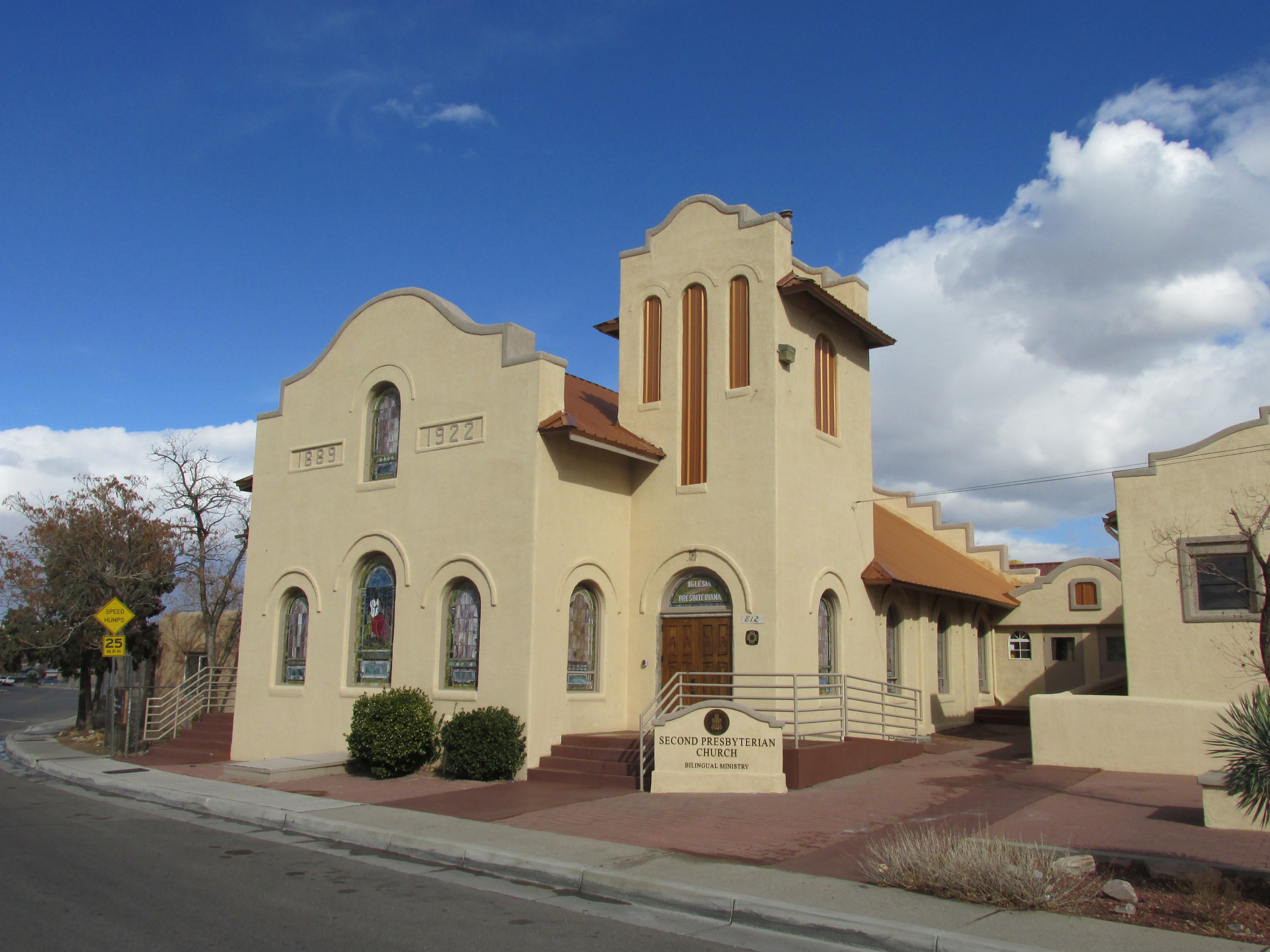
Second United Presbyterian Church, built in 1922

In the 1700s, the sandhills that make up Martineztown were a common area used by residents of Old Town to graze their sheep. Separated from Old Town by marshlands, the area was accessible via the Old Carnuel Trail (now Mountain Road) and a section of the Camino Real de Tierra Adentro called El Camino del Lado (Side Road) which skirted the Rio Grande valley floor. This later became the old Bernalillo Road and then Edith Boulevard. A small agricultural community developed after Manuel Martín and his family moved to the area around 1850. Irrigation for farming was provided by the Acequia Madre de los Barelas, which also brought water to the downstream community of Barelas. The land was divided into narrow lots fronting on the acequia as in other farming communities in the region.

The development of Martineztown accelerated after the Atchison, Topeka and Santa Fe Railway reached Albuquerque in 1880, and much of the present neighborhood dates from this period. In the early 1900s, the adjacent community of Santa Barbara began to develop as well. The communities centered on Edith Boulevard, which was lined with stores, dance halls, and other small businesses. Area residents built a Presbyterian church, Second United Presbyterian Church, in 1889, and a Catholic church, San Ignacio Church, in 1916. Martineztown was annexed by the city of Albuquerque in 1898, followed by Santa Barbara in 1948.

Starting in the 1940s, the neighborhood's physical condition began to deteriorate. City leaders viewed the low-income, mostly Hispanic area as blighted and believed the land could be better used as an extension of Downtown. Zoning regulations enacted in 1959 designated most of Martineztown for commercial and industrial use, eroding the neighborhood's low-density residential character and discouraging new home construction in favor of industrial and storage facilities. In 1971, neighborhood residents successfully organized to fight a large-scale urban renewal project that would have razed the southern end of the neighborhood to build a new campus for Albuquerque High School. Instead, the school was built on vacant land near Interstate 25. Still, tensions with the city government have continued to simmer. In 2018, neighborhood activists launched a new lawsuit against the city alleging discriminatory zoning regulations.

== Points of interest ==
Martineztown-Santa Barbara has four properties which are listed on the National Register of Historic Places:

- Old St. Joseph Hospital
- San Ignacio Church
- Santa Barbara School
- Second United Presbyterian Church

One other property, the F.M. Mercantile, is listed on the New Mexico State Register of Cultural Properties.

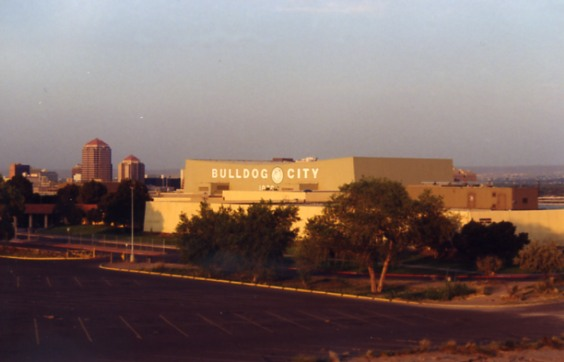
Albuquerque High School

== Education ==
Albuquerque Public Schools operates two schools in Martineztown-Santa Barbara: Longfellow Elementary School and Albuquerque High School. Longfellow serves students who live south of Interstate 40, while those to the north attend Cochiti Elementary. Older students in the neighborhood are assigned to Jefferson Middle School and Albuquerque High. Albuquerque Charter Academy is also located in the neighborhood.

== Transportation ==
ABQ Ride operates public transit in the neighborhood, including the 5 Montgomery-Carlisle, 6 Indian School Commuter, 8 Menaul, 11 Lomas, 12 Constitution Commuter, 16 Broadway-University-Gibson, 50 Airport-Downtown, and 92 Taylor Ranch Express city bus routes.
