= West San Jose School =

- U.S. National Register of Historic Places
- NM State Register of Cultural Properties
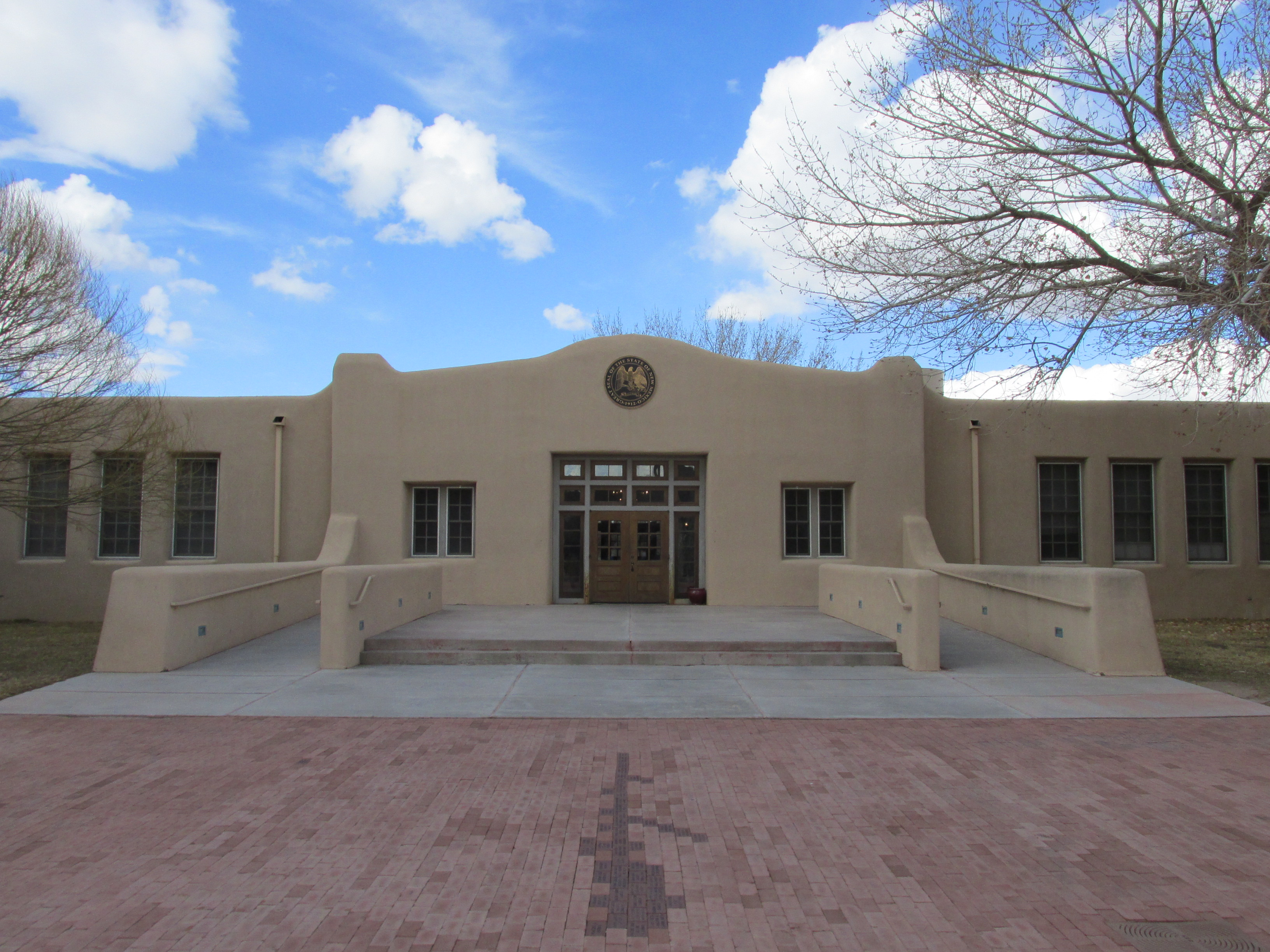
- West San Jose School, February 2013

- Location within New Mexico Location within the United States
- Location: 1701 4th St. SW, Albuquerque, New Mexico
- Coordinates: 35°04′06″N 106°39′19″W
- Built: 1937
- Architect: Louis G. Hesselden
- Architectural style: Pueblo Revival
- NRHP reference No.: 96001385
- NMSRCP No.: 1645

Significant dates
- Added to NRHP: November 22, 1996
- Designated NMSRCP: September 27, 1996

West San Jose School, also known as Riverview School, is a historic former elementary school in the Barelas neighborhood of Albuquerque, New Mexico. It was built in 1936–37 as a Works Progress Administration project and operated as a school until 1975. It is now part of the National Hispanic Cultural Center. The building was added to the New Mexico State Register of Cultural Properties and the National Register of Historic Places in 1996.

== History ==
West San Jose School was built in 1936–7 by the now-defunct Bernalillo County school district. The existing school in the area, South Second Street, was a converted church with only three classrooms and was in a bad location adjacent to the railyard. Due to the inadequacy of this facility, many of the neighborhood students had been forced to attend the similarly crowded Barelas School, or the East San Jose School (the latter requiring a dangerous railroad crossing). The county superintendent, Margaret Easterday, wanted to replace the Barelas and South Second Street schools with a large new facility, but had only $2,500 available for the project. Nevertheless, the district purchased land for a new school in February 1936.

Easterday initially planned to build a small two-room school as a stopgap measure, expanding it when funds allowed. However, this turned out to be unnecessary thanks to the unprecedented public works funding available from President Franklin D. Roosevelt's New Deal programs. With assistance from Governor Clyde Tingley, the school district was able to secure a grant of $53,000 from the Works Progress Administration to build the school. The construction project, using adobe bricks and traditional building methods, lasted ten months and employed 70 workers. The school opened to students in the fall of 1937, after which the South Second Street and Barelas schools were closed.

In 1949, West San Jose was absorbed into Albuquerque Public Schools along with the rest of the county system. In the late 1950s the name was changed to Riverview Elementary. Both Riverview and the nearby Coronado Elementary were closed in 1975 when a new school, Dolores Gonzales, was built. In 1977 the unused school was converted into a job skills center under the control of the Technical Vocational Institute (now Central New Mexico Community College). The school was renovated in the early 2000s and now houses the library and archives of the National Hispanic Cultural Center.

== Architecture ==
West San Jose School is a one-story adobe building designed in the Pueblo Revival style by local architect Louis G. Hesselden. The floorplan is H-shaped with projecting wings on either side of a central block. The roofline is stepped, with a curved parapet above the projecting main entry, and the walls are stuccoed and buttressed at the corners. The classrooms are illuminated by large 9/9 sash windows, with smaller 4/4 and 2/2 windows elsewhere. The entrances to the building have double doors with transoms and sidelights.
