= ECADEMY High School =

Coordinates: 35°6′15.3″N 106°35′4.2″W

eCADEMY Alternative School
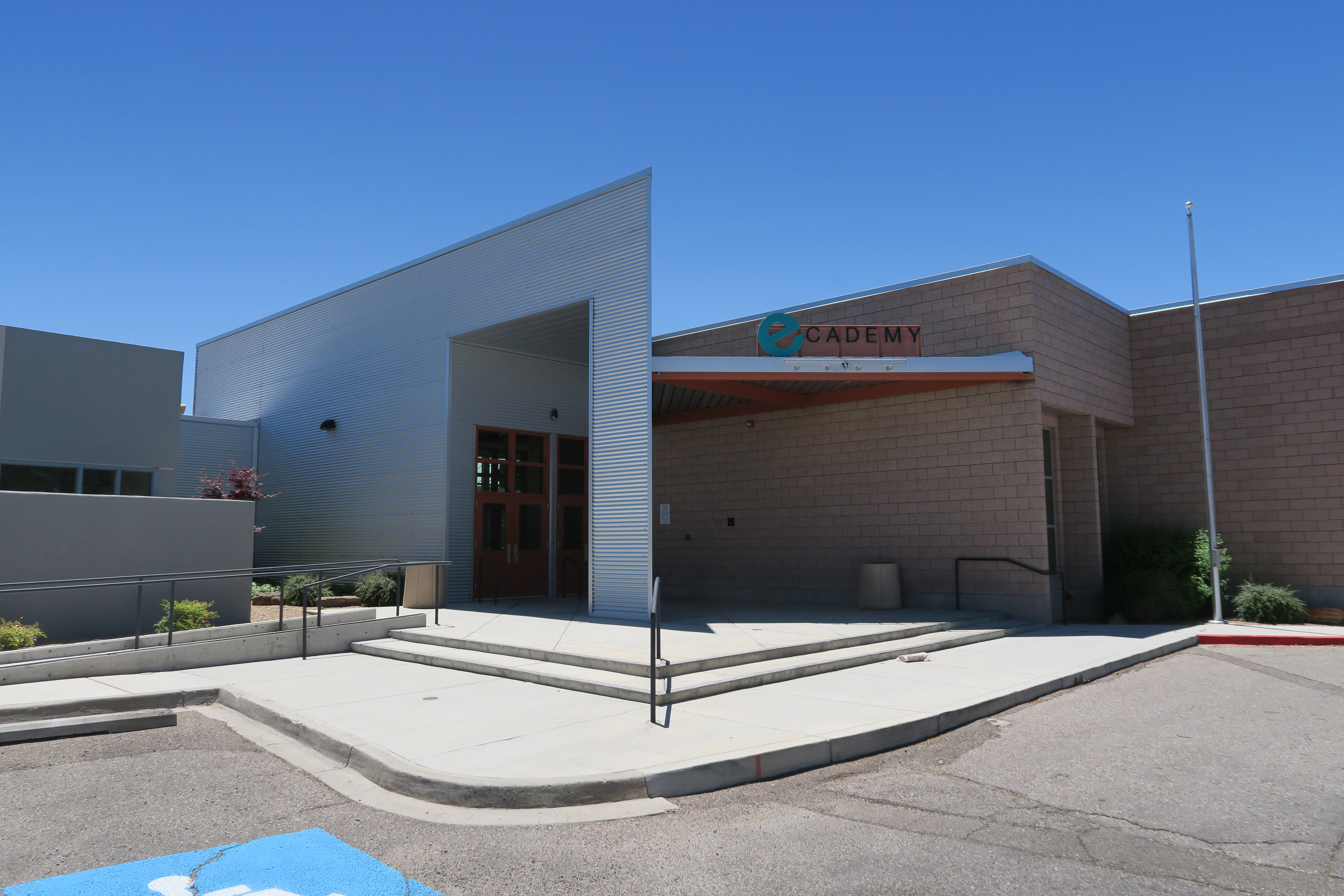
- eCADEMY
- 5300 Cutler NE; Albuquerque, NM 87110

Information
- Type: Public high school
- Established: 2010
- Principal: Dave Wells
- Enrollment: 1,035 (2023–2024)
- Colors Mascot: Navy, orange and turquoise Owl
- Website: ecademy.aps.edu

eCADEMY High School (formerly Albuquerque Evening High School) is located in Albuquerque, New Mexico, USA and is managed by Albuquerque Public Schools. Albuquerque Evening High was started in 1913 as part of Albuquerque High School. Although it still shared space with AHS, in 1977 Albuquerque Evening High became an independent school, with its own administration and staff. The school is an alternative to summer school for students who need to earn credits to graduate and for those who wish to graduate early.

In May 2007, Albuquerque Public Schools announced plans to move the school to a new alternative school complex. Construction for the facility began in the spring of 2008 and should be completed for the fall of 2009. In the spring of 2011, Albuquerque Evening High School celebrated the opening of its own facility located at 5300 Cutler NE 87110 and was renamed eCADEMY Alternative School
