= Old Armijo School =

- U.S. National Register of Historic Places
- NM State Register of Cultural Properties
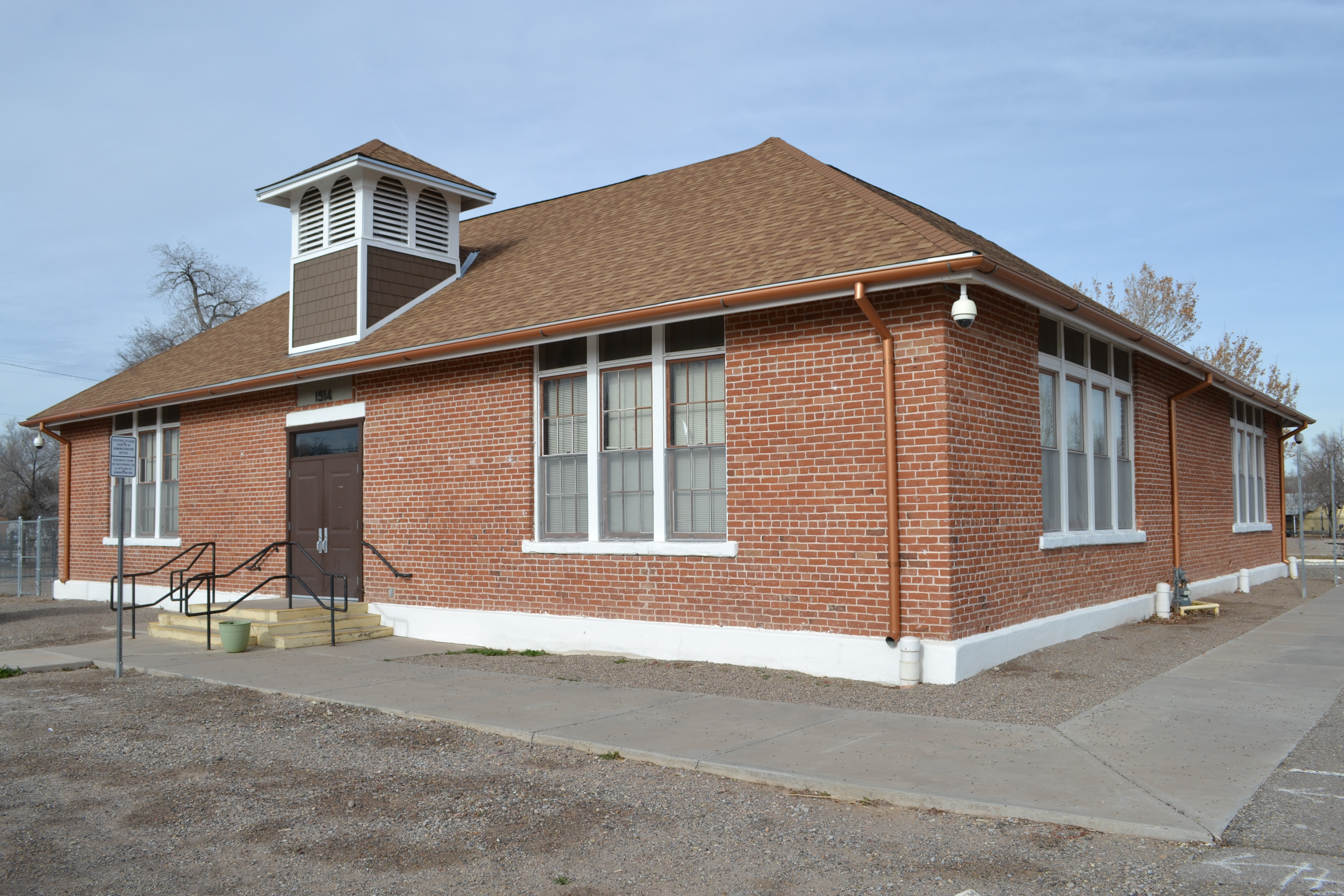
- Old Armijo School, January 2017

- Location within New Mexico Location within the United States
- Location: 1021 Isleta Blvd. SW, Albuquerque, New Mexico
- Coordinates: 35°03′22″N 106°40′14″W
- Built: 1914
- Architect: Atanasio Montoya
- NRHP reference No.: 82003315
- NMSRCP No.: 852

Significant dates
- Added to NRHP: September 16, 1982
- Designated NMSRCP: March 12, 1982

The Old Armijo School, also known as the Ranchos de Atrisco School, is a historic school building in the South Valley area of Albuquerque, New Mexico. It is notable as one of the only surviving school buildings attributed to Atanasio Montoya, a noted educator who reformed and modernized the Bernalillo County school system in the early 20th century. The school was added to the New Mexico State Register of Cultural Properties and the National Register of Historic Places in 1982.

== History ==
The school was built in 1914 under the leadership of Bernalillo County school superintendent Atanasio Montoya, who was appointed in 1912 and almost immediately began an ambitious project to modernize the rural school system. At the time of Montoya's appointment, school attendance was poor and most students were attending class in one-room adobe shacks. Within two years, modern school buildings had been built or were planned for several districts and enrollment was up 60%. One of the new schools was the Ranchos de Atrisco school in county district 9, which served the rural community of Armijo. As with most of his projects, Montoya designed the building himself, employing the latest features to ensure the school would be comfortable and functional. Upon its completion, the Albuquerque Journal described the school as "modern in every particular, well ventilated, well lighted, and equipped in accordance with the very latest and most approved ideas." The original construction cost was $12,000.

By the late 1930s, county officials were planning a replacement school. The New Armijo School (now Kit Carson Elementary) opened in 1940 but the district schools had become so crowded by that point that the old school had to be kept open too. Old Armijo was annexed by Albuquerque Public Schools in 1949 along with all of the other remaining county schools, and in 1954 the school celebrated its 40th year of operation. It finally closed around 1960 when the current Armijo Elementary was built a short distance to the northwest. The building later housed the Bernalillo County Economic Opportunity Board, was used for a time as a community center, and now houses the RFK Charter School.

== Architecture ==
The Old Armijo School is a one-story brick building with a high hipped roof. It was designed by county superintendent Atanasio Montoya in accordance with his belief that school rooms should be roomy, bright, and well ventilated. The building has a central hall with three classrooms on the west side and one large room on the east side which can be subdivided with a folding partition. The classrooms are illuminated by tall 6-over-6 sash windows with transoms which could be opened to improve ventilation. The main entrance on the south facade is crowned with a small bell tower, which was removed at some point in the 1970s and later replaced. The original brick chimneys have also been removed, but most of the school's innovative features have been preserved.

== See also ==
- Santa Barbara School - an Atanasio Montoya-era school building in the Martineztown-Santa Barbara area of Albuquerque
