= Monte Vista Elementary School =

There are a number of Elementary schools named Monte Vista Elementary School:

- Monte Vista Elementary School (Santa Ana, California)
- Monte Vista Elementary School (Santa Barbara, California)
- Monte Vista Elementary School (Albuquerque, New Mexico)
- Monte Vista Elementary School (South Jordan, Utah)
