= Clarence Bass =

American lawyer

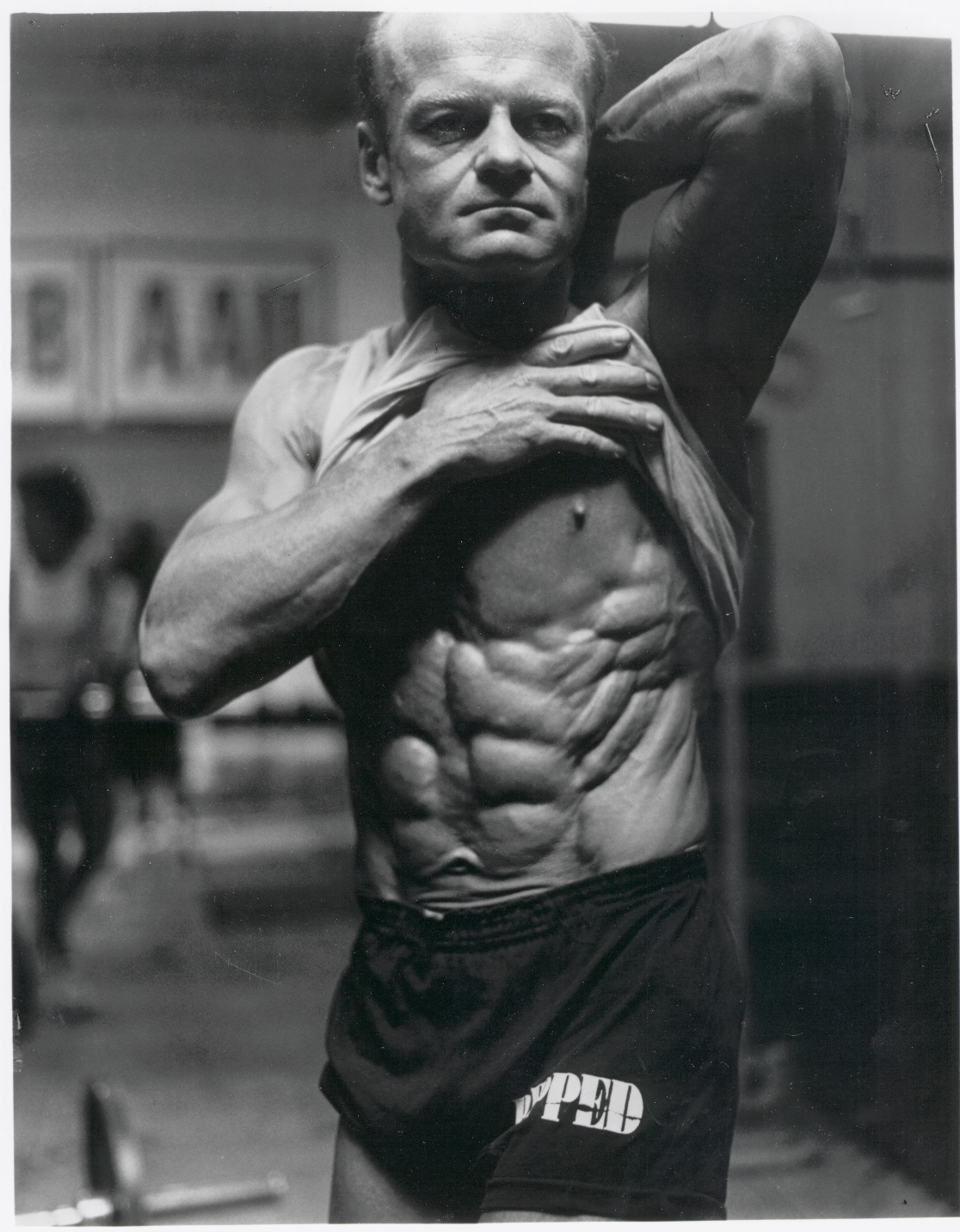
- Born: 1937 (age 87–88); Albuquerque, New Mexico
- Education: Juris Doctor
- Alma mater: University of New Mexico School of Law
- Website: www.cbass.com

Clarence Bass (born 1937 in New Mexico) is an American writer, fitness expert, and retired lawyer. He is best known for his book and DVD series Ripped, which chronicle his fitness, including becoming a past-40 bodybuilding champion. Bass was a writer for Muscle & Fitness where he had a question and answer column. He has continued to write, documenting his fitness over a span of approximately 60 years in various books that he has released since 1980. He is featured in the books Second Wind and Legends of the Iron Game. In the June 2017 issue of Men's Health, Bass was named "one of America’s greatest fitness visionaries." He is an advocate of plant-based nutrition.

== Early life and education ==
Bass was born in Albuquerque, New Mexico in 1937. His parents were both in the health field, one a doctor and the other a nurse.

He attended Albuquerque High School, where as a junior, he won the New Mexico State Championship in the pentathlon. He excelled in wrestling, placing second in the New Mexico State Championships his senior year. Although he began lifting weights at the age of 13, it was during high school that he began to get into Olympic lifting, which helped lead him into a career in health and fitness.

Bass earned an undergraduate in psychology from the University of New Mexico, then attended the University of New Mexico School of Law. While obtaining his Juris Doctor degree, he focused his athletics primarily on weightlifting, achieving a 275-pound Olympic press, a 245 snatch, and 325 clean and jerk with a body weight of 180 lbs. After graduation, he went on to practice law in Albuquerque.

Bass described his own diet as lacto-ovo-pescetarian.

== Career ==
Bass began his professional career as a lawyer practicing in Albuquerque. During his time as an attorney, he became prominent in the world of fitness and retired from the legal field in 1994 to concentrate on health and fitness full-time. While also working full-time as a lawyer, Bass entered numerous bodybuilding competitions and won numerous awards.

Bass entered his first bodybuilding competition in 1976. A year later in 1977, he measured a body fat percentage of 2.4%, measured using hydrostatic weighing at Lovelace Medical Center. His first successful competition was at the New Mexico Bodybuilding Championship in 1978, taking home the awards for "Best Legs" and "Most Muscular". The same year he began competing in the national Past 40 competitions, winning the AAU Past 40 Mr. America, short class. The next year he won his class in the AAU Past 40 Mr. USA, along with the overall awards for Best Legs, Best Abdominals, and Most Muscular Man. His final year of competition came in 1980, again competing in the Past 40 Mr. America. He placed 2nd in the middleweight class and subsequently retired from competition.

Bass was featured in the book Second Wind: The Rise of the Ageless Athlete. In the book, he addressed his reasons for retiring from competition, stating, “I had nothing to gain and everything to lose.” He added, “I developed my reputation with new photos [every few years] and these contests aren’t a lot of fun.”

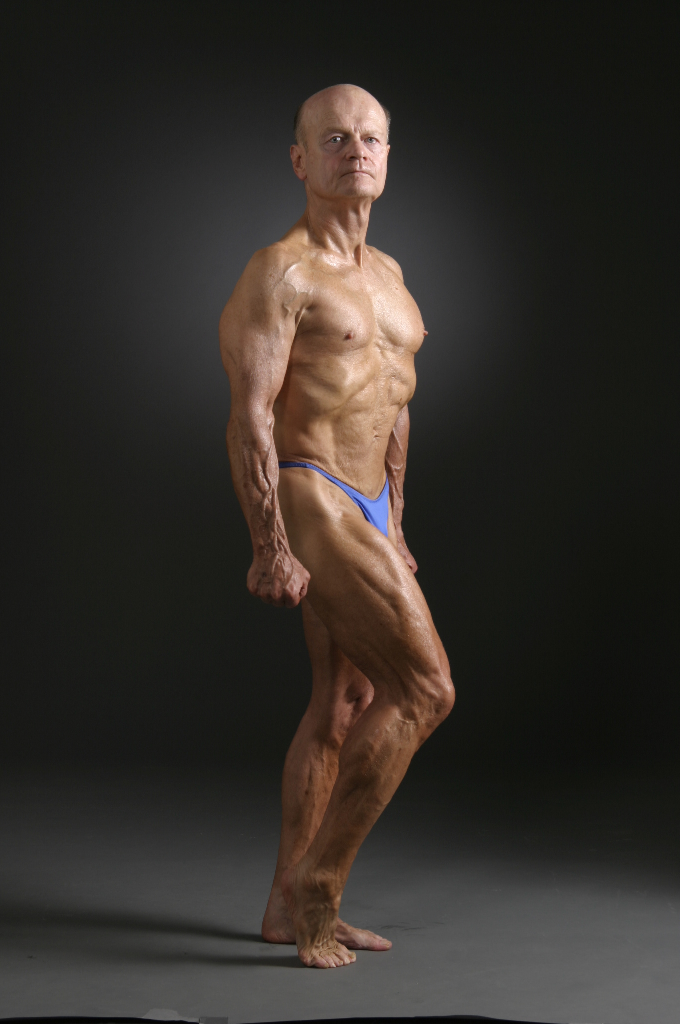
Clarence Bass in 2014

Bass wrote his first book in 1980, the same year he retired from competition. Titled Ripped: The Sensible Way to Achieve Ultimate Muscularity, the book detailed his fitness routine and how he reduced his body fat to 2.4%. It also documented his experience during his bodybuilding competitions, including the Past-40 Mr. America and Mr. USA contests.

The book was originally sent to Bill Reynolds, then editor in chief of Muscle & Fitness, who shared it with Joe Weider. The book led to Bass being invited to write a column in the magazine, which ran over the course of sixteen years.

Bass and his wife Carol formed Ripped Enterprises the same year, a company he uses to sell his books and related items.

Bass continued writing for Muscle & Fitness, and released a follow-up book entitled Ripped 2 which was then followed by Ripped 3. From 1984 to 1994, he published additional books including Lean Advantage, a three-book series composed of various writings from his time at Muscle & Fitness. He also published the book Lean for Life which was released in 1989. Bass has released additional books since the 1996 release of Challenge Yourself, a summary of his diet and training.

His books led to a series of DVDs, which he first released in 2002 in collaboration with Wayne and Tina Gallasch of GMV Productions. The first was based on his book Ripped, with additional DVDs following in 2003 and 2004.

Bass' fitness training has also extended past bodybuilding, also concentrating on indoor rowing. By 1992, he was ranked 21st in the world for light-heavyweight men ages 50 to 59. His highest ranking came in 2003 when he was 4th in the 500-meter row for light-weight men ages 60 to 69.

=== Bibliography ===
- —— (1980). Ripped: The Sensible Way to Achieve Ultimate Muscularity. Clarence Bass' Ripped Enterprises. ISBN 978-0-9609714-0-4.
- —— (1982). Ripped 2. Clarence Bass' Ripped Enterprises. ISBN 978-0-9609714-1-1.
- —— (1984). The Lean Advantage. Clarence Bass' Ripped Enterprises. ISBN 978-0-9609714-2-8.
- —— (1986). Ripped 3: The Recipes, The Routines and The Reasons. Clarence Bass' Ripped Enterprises. ISBN 978-0-9609714-3-5.
- —— (1989). The Lean Advantage 2: The Second Four Years. Clarence Bass' Ripped Enterprises. ISBN 978-0-9609714-4-2.
- —— (1992). Lean For Life: Stay Motivated and Lean Forever. Clarence Bass' Ripped Enterprises. ISBN 978-0-9609714-5-9.
- —— (1994). The Lean Advantage 3: Four More Years. Clarence Bass' Ripped Enterprises. ISBN 978-0-9609714-6-6.
- —— (1999). Challenge Yourself: Leanness, Fitness & Health At Any Age. Clarence Bass' Ripped Enterprises. ISBN 978-0-9609714-7-3.
- —— (2007). Great Expectations: Health, Fitness, Leanness Without Suffering. Clarence Bass' Ripped Enterprises. ISBN 978-0-9747682-4-3.
- —— (2013). Take Charge: Fitness at the Edge of Science. Clarence Bass' Ripped Enterprises. ISBN 978-0974768250.

=== Filmography ===
- Clarence Bass (2002). Ripped, The DVD (DVD). GMV Productions and Clarence Bass Ripped Enterprises.
- Clarence Bass (2003). The Second Ripped DVD (DVD). GMV Productions and Clarence Bass Ripped Enterprises.
- Clarence Bass (2003). The Third Ripped DVD (DVD). GMV Productions and Clarence Bass Ripped Enterprises.

== Awards and recognition ==
Bass has won numerous awards throughout his career in bodybuilding. He was among 100 UNM graduates chosen by the Alumni Association to represent the "Best Efforts" of the university on the occasion of its 100th anniversary. In 2003, The Association of Oldetime Barbell & Strongmen honored him with its highest award, the Vic Boff Award for lifetime achievement. Photos of Bass from ages 15 to 70 are on display in the Lutcher Stark Center for Physical Culture and Sports at the University of Texas at Austin. In 2013, experts in exercise physiology gathered at the Stark Center to celebrate Bass' lifetime achievements and discuss his book Take Charge.
