= Santa Barbara School =

Historic place in New Mexico, United States

- U.S. National Register of Historic Places
- NM State Register of Cultural Properties
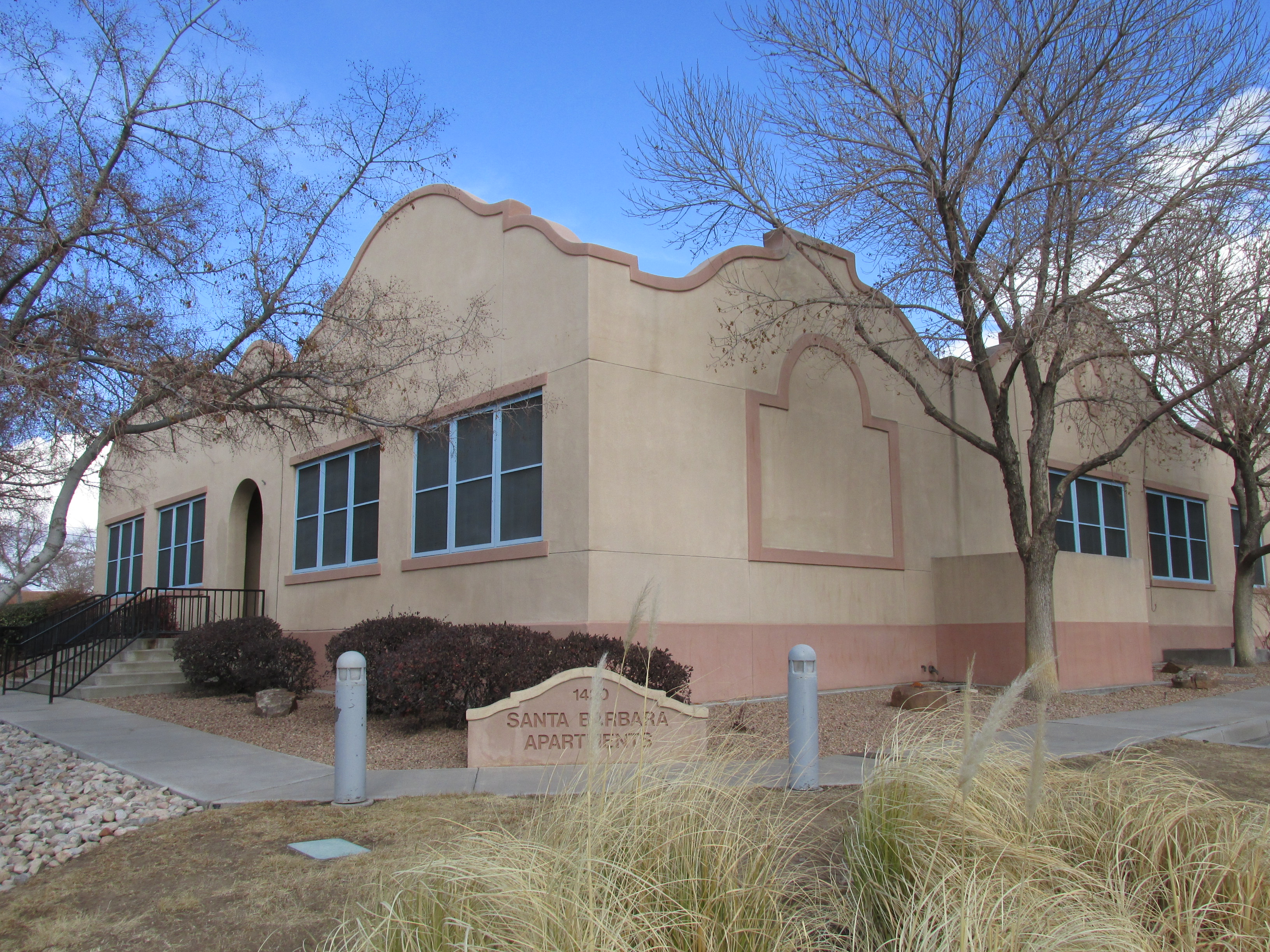
- Santa Barbara School, February 2013

- Location within New Mexico Location within the United States
- Location: 1420 Edith Blvd. NE, Albuquerque, New Mexico
- Coordinates: 35°05′51″N 106°38′17″W
- Built: 1908
- Architectural style: Mission Revival
- NRHP reference No.: 89001590
- NMSRCP No.: 1510

Significant dates
- Added to NRHP: September 28, 1989
- Designated NMSRCP: August 4, 1989

The Santa Barbara School was a historic school building in the Martineztown-Santa Barbara neighborhood of Albuquerque, New Mexico. Built in phases between 1908 and 1930, it was one of the city's oldest surviving school buildings and was notable for its association with Atanasio Montoya, a noted educator who reformed and modernized the Bernalillo County school system in the early 20th century. The school was added to the New Mexico State Register of Cultural Properties and the National Register of Historic Places in 1989.

The school was destroyed by a fire in 2026.

== History ==
The Martineztown-Santa Barbara area was settled in the mid-1800s as a rural Hispanic community some 2 miles (3.2 km) from the Albuquerque plaza. The Santa Barbara School was established there in 1908 as part of Bernalillo County school district 13, which also included the schools at Old Town and Duranes. The original two-room schoolhouse was constructed of adobe with a stone foundation; a third room was added at some point in the subsequent decade. In 1912 the Bernalillo County schools were taken over by a new superintendent, Atanasio Montoya, who is credited with modernizing the county school system. Under Montoya's tenure the school was expanded again in 1919. This addition, designed by architect E. H. Norris, added one large room with a folding partition to the south side of the school, separated from the three older classrooms by a central hall. In this configuration the building was similar in layout to the Old Armijo School which is still standing in the South Valley.

The school was expanded still further in 1924, adding a second large partitionable room to the south side and adding the distinctive Mission style curved parapet. Prior to this project, the school was reportedly so crowded that even the hallway was being used for classes. Two other additions were constructed at the back of the building around 1926 and 1930, respectively. However, declining populations in the Martineztown area saw the enrollment at Santa Barbara drop from 232 to 139 between 1930 and 1940. In the late 1940s District 13 was taken over by Albuquerque Public Schools, whose nearby Longfellow Elementary was also experiencing declining enrollment. By 1952 Santa Barbara was down to just eight full-time teachers, and it closed completely in 1971. APS continued to use the building for auxiliary purposes until 1986, then sold it to the city of Albuquerque in 1988. The school was then renovated into housing for senior citizens in 1991.

The building was damaged by a fire in December, 2025. In November, 2026, the building caught fire again and was reported to be a total loss.

== Architecture ==
The Santa Barbara School was a one-story building of varied materials, with sections of adobe, brick, and concrete block construction. It was designed in a simplified Mission Revival style, with stuccoed walls, arched doorways, and curvilinear parapets, which concealed a partially hipped and partially flat roof. The school was organized around a central hallway extending nearly the full length of the building with classrooms on either side, and the exterior was generally symmetrical about this axis. Most of the windows were 6-over-6 sashes grouped in threes.
