= Stanley J. Brasher =

American politician (1928–2021)

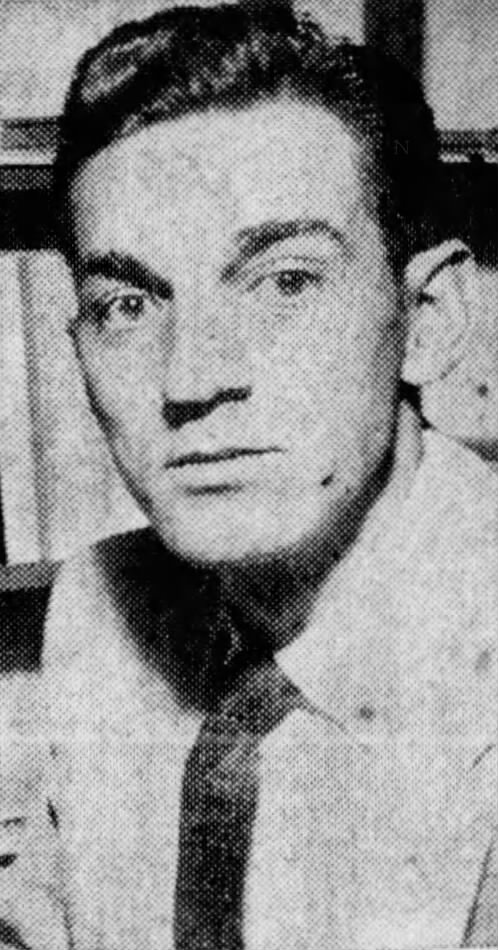
- Brasher in 1958

Member of the New Mexico House of Representatives
- In office 1959–1965

Personal details
- Born: May 4, 1928 Santa Rosa, New Mexico, U.S.
- Died: September 6, 2021 (aged 93)
- Party: Democratic
- Spouse: Joan Jacobs
- Children: 6
- Education: University of New Mexico

Stanley J. Brasher (May 4, 1928 – September 6, 2021) was an American politician. He served as a member of the New Mexico House of Representatives.

== Life and career ==
Brasher was born in Santa Rosa, New Mexico. He attended Albuquerque High School and the University of New Mexico.

His service in the New Mexico House of Representatives lasted from 1959 to 1965.

He died on September 6, 2021, at the age of 93.
