= Greg Brown (basketball, born 1972) =

American basketball player (1972–2024)

Personal information
- Born: November 26, 1972 Albuquerque, New Mexico, U.S.
- Died: June 14, 2024 (aged 51)
- Listed height: 5 ft 7 in (1.70 m)
- Listed weight: 140 lb (64 kg)

Career information
- High school: Albuquerque (Albuquerque, New Mexico)
- College: New Mexico JC (1990–1992); New Mexico (1992–1994)
- NBA draft: 1994: undrafted
- Position: Point guard
- Number: 12

Career highlights
- WAC Player of the Year (1994); Frances Pomeroy Naismith Award (1994); First-team All-WAC (1994)

Greg Brown (November 26, 1972 – June 14, 2024) was an American basketball player and high school coach. He was known for his standout college career at the University of New Mexico, where he was Western Athletic Conference (WAC) Player of the Year in 1994 and won the Frances Pomeroy Naismith Award as the nation's best player under six feet tall.

Brown, a 5 ft 7 in (1.70 m) point guard from Albuquerque High School, played collegiately at New Mexico Junior College from 1990 to 1992. He moved to his hometown University of New Mexico to play for coach Dave Bliss from 1992 to 1994. Brown led the Lobos to consecutive NCAA tournament berths in 1993 and 1994. As a senior in 1993–94, Brown averaged 19.3 points per game and led the Lobos to their first regular season conference championship in 16 years. At the end of the season, Brown was named the WAC player of the year and nationally was awarded the Frances Pomeroy Naismith Award, given to the top senior in the nation under six feet tall.

Brown was the head coach of his former high school, Albuquerque High School. In 2022, Brown was fired as head coach from Albuquerque High School, as they, "wanted new leadership in the boys basketball program."

Brown died in an automobile collision on June 14, 2024, at the age of 51.
