= Carlisle Gymnasium =

- U.S. National Register of Historic Places
- NM State Register of Cultural Properties
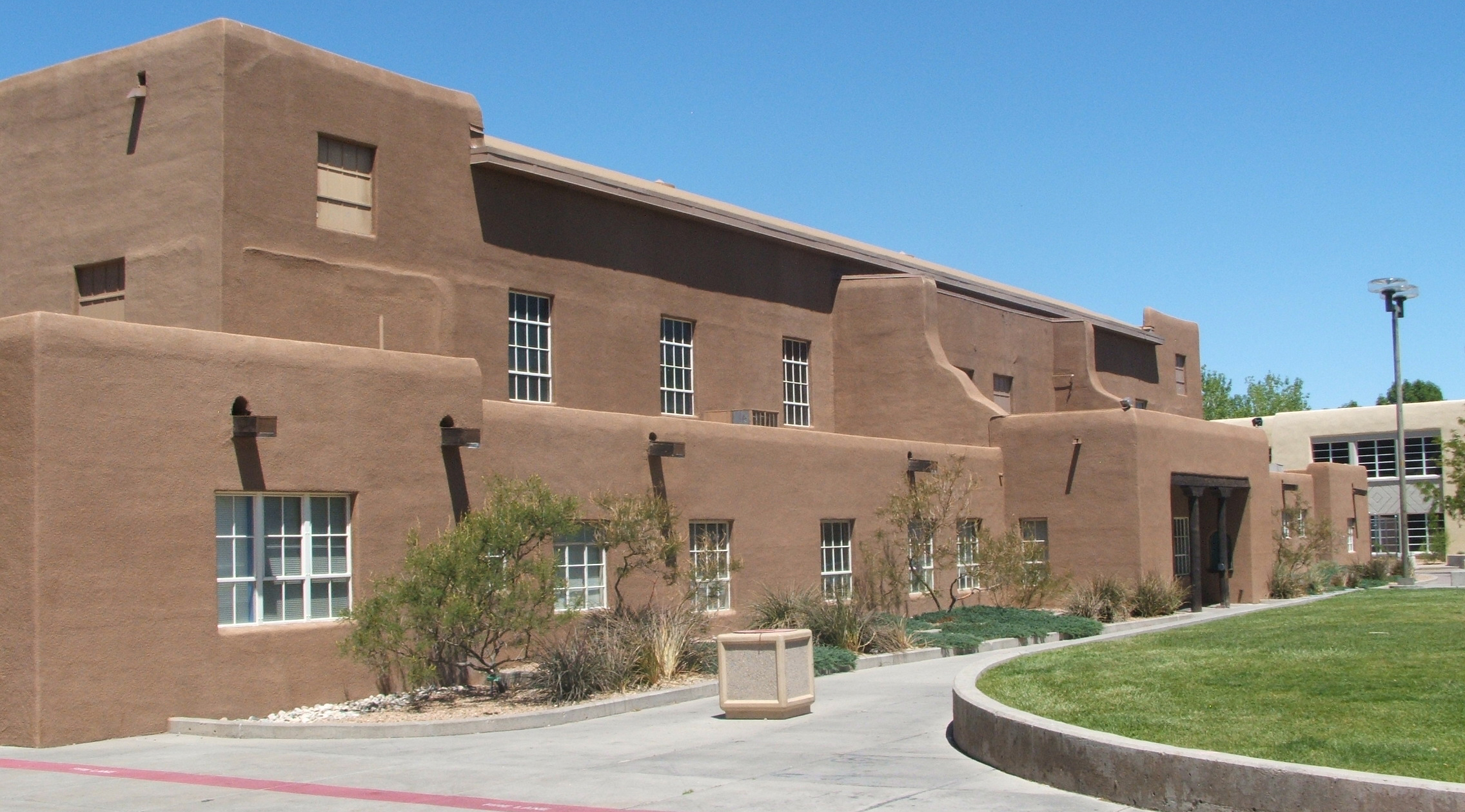
- Carlisle Gymnasium

- Location within New Mexico Location within the United States
- Location: 301 Yale Blvd. NE; Albuquerque, New Mexico
- Coordinates: 35°05′01″N 106°37′22″W
- Built: 1928
- Architect: Gaastra, Gladding and Johnson
- Architectural style: Pueblo revival
- NRHP reference No.: 88001541
- NMSRCP No.: 1453

Significant dates
- Added to NRHP: September 22, 1988
- Designated NMSRCP: July 8, 1988

Carlisle Gymnasium is an indoor arena on the campus of the University of New Mexico in Albuquerque, New Mexico. It was the home of the New Mexico Lobos basketball team from its opening in 1928 until the completion of the larger Johnson Gymnasium in 1957, and was also the original venue of the New Mexico Symphony Orchestra. On 4 November 1948, Carlisle Gymnasium was the venue of the world premiere of Arnold Schoenberg's A Survivor from Warsaw, a cantata written in tribute to the victims of the Holocoaust. The building currently houses the university's Elizabeth Waters Center for Dance.

The building was designed by the firm of Gaastra, Gladding and Johnson in the Pueblo Revival architectural style, which was the de facto official style for all new buildings on campus. In a novel application of the style, the architects used stepped massing, vigas, and other Pueblo details to mask the rectilinear form of the gymnasium. The building was completed at a cost of approximately $85,000 and was named after Hugh Carlisle, a UNM student who died in World War I. Carlisle Gymnasium was added to the New Mexico State Register of Cultural Properties and the National Register of Historic Places in 1988.
