= La Academia de Esperanza =

Coordinates: 35°3′30″N 106°42′19″W

La Academia de Esperanza (LADE) is a charter school in Albuquerque, New Mexico, United States. LADE has two campuses: one at the Desert Hills Treatment Center and the other in Albuquerque's South Valley at the intersection of Coors and Old Coors. La Academia de Esperanza has a charter through Albuquerque Public Schools.

La Academia de Esperanza was founded in 2003 to serve "the growing population of 'at risk' youth" in Albuquerque.
