= Gustave Baumann House =

- Jane and Gustave Baumann House and Studio
- U.S. National Register of Historic Places
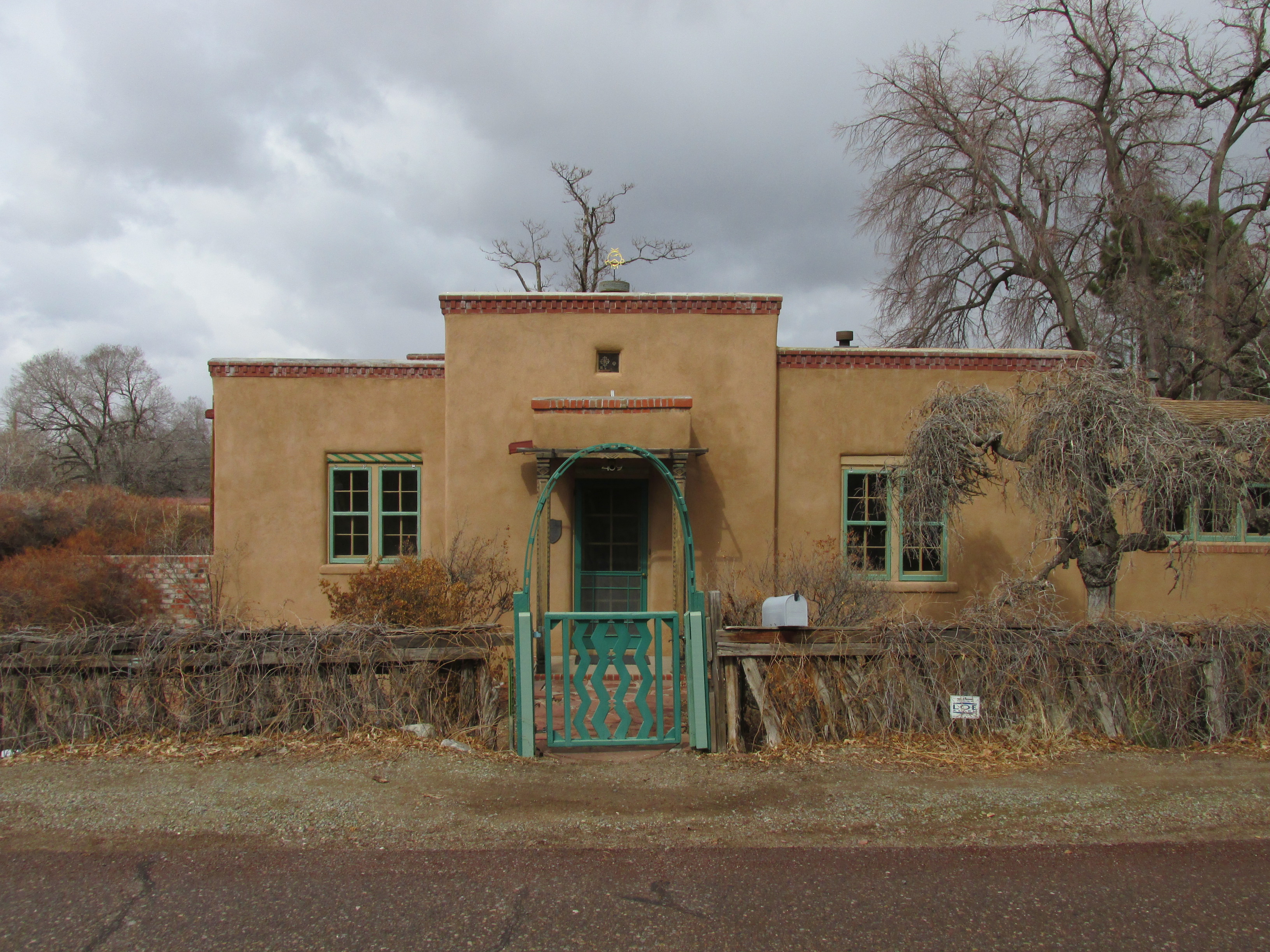

- Location within New Mexico
- Location: 409 Camino de Las Animas, Santa Fe, New Mexico
- Coordinates: 35°40′39″N 105°56′13″W
- Area: 0.1 acres (0.040 ha)
- Built: 1923
- Architect: T. Charles Gaastra
- Architectural style: Late 19th And 20th Century Revivals, Eclectic
- NRHP reference No.: 12000875
- Added to NRHP: October 10, 2012

The Gustave Baumann House, at 409 Camino de Las Animas in Santa Fe, New Mexico, was built in 1923. It was listed on the National Register of Historic Places in 2012 as the Jane and Gustave Baumann House and Studio. The listing included two contributing buildings, a contributing structure, and a contributing object.

It was the home of artist Gustave Baumann. It is built of adobe. "The house was designed by Baumann and translated into formal plans by architect Charles Gaastra. It was built around a windowless interior room which had steel doors and served as a fireproof storage room for wood blocks, prints, and valuable papers."

== See also ==
- Acequia Madre House
