= T. Charles Gaastra =

American architect

Tjalke Charles Gaastra
- Born: 1879; Netherlands
- Died: August 15, 1947; Albuquerque, New Mexico
- Occupation: Architect
- Awards: International Exhibit of Architecture-Berlin
- Practice: Gaastra, Gladding and Johnson
- Buildings: Wool Warehouse (Albuquerque, New Mexico), Eugene Field School, Bishop's Lodge, Bernalillo County Court House, 710 Gildersleeve Street, Santa Fe, Carlisle Gymnasium, University of New Mexico campus, Theatre Building for Jack Brandenburg, Gormley School, Baumann House, Cassell building, Santa Fe Plaza, Monte Vista Elementary School

Tjalke Charles Gaastra (1879 – 1947) was an American architect who worked in the American Midwest and Southwest in the first half of the twentieth century. He won the International Exhibit of Architecture in Berlin for the Gildersleeve house in Santa Fe, New Mexico which he designed for New Mexico Supreme Court justice, David Chavez. Gaastra was a major player in the Spanish Pueblo Revival architectural style in Santa Fe, New Mexico.

== Early-to-mid-life ==
Born in the Netherlands as a son of Douwe Gaastra (1854–1943), a building contractor from Friesland, and his first wife Tryntje (1850–1918), Gaastra emigrated with his family to Kenosha, Wisconsin in 1889, where his father established a successful construction firm. Between the ages of 14 and 21, Gaastra worked as a hod carrier, bricklayer and logger. From 1901 to 1910, he was an architect in Kenosha.

In 1911, Gaastra received his architecture license from the state of Illinois, and worked in Chicago for seven years designing schools. He married in 1917 and moved to Santa Fe, New Mexico in 1918. Gaastra was architect on the Gildersleeve home built for David Chavez in 1928, property originally owned by painter/photographer, Carlos Vierra.

== Move to Albuquerque ==
In 1923, T. Charles Gaastra, who had come to Santa Fe in 1918 and designed buildings using the emergent Santa Fe style, had moved his practice to the larger, more promising Albuquerque which left architects John Gaw Meem and Cassius McCormick in demand.

== Projects ==
While in Kenosha, Gaastra designed the following new school buildings:

- Durkee Elementary School (completed 1905; closed and demolished in 2008).
- Edward Bain Elementary School (completed 1907; closed 2004 and demolished in 2018).
- Columbus Elementary School (completed 1910; closed and sold in 2011).

In his later career, his best-known buildings include the 710 Gildersleeve property, the Cassell building, the Bishop's Lodge, Gormley Elementary School, and the Gustave Baumann House in Santa Fe, New Mexico; the Wool Warehouse, Monte Vista Elementary School, the Carlisle Gymnasium, the Hendren Building, and the old Bernalillo County Courthouse in Albuquerque, New Mexico; and the Theatre Building built for Jack Brandenburg in Taos, New Mexico. Several of Gaastra's buildings are listed in the National Register of Historic Places.
