= Albuquerque High School =

Coordinates: 35.096558°N 106.635299°W

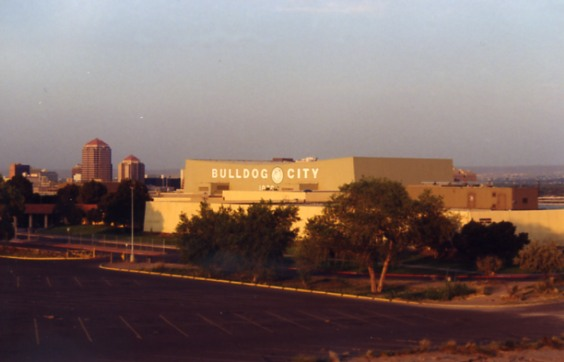

Location
- 800 Odelia Rd. NE; Albuquerque, New Mexico 87102; United States

Information
- Type: Public high school
- Established: 1879
- Principal: Cesar Hernandez
- Staff: 103.60 (FTE)
- Enrollment: 1,683 (2023-2024)
- Student to teacher ratio: 16.25
- Campus: Urban
- Colors: Kelly Green and white
- Athletics conference: NMAA, 5A Dist. 5 (Football: Independent)
- Mascot: Bulldog
- Nickname: Bulldogs
- Rivals: Valley High
- Website: albuquerquehigh.aps.edu

Albuquerque High School is a public high school near Downtown Albuquerque, New Mexico, United States. It is a part of the Albuquerque Public Schools district. Enrollment at AHS stands at 1,741.

AHS was named the 43rd best high school in the state of New Mexico by U.S. News & World Report. The school is directly adjacent to the Early College Academy, a college prep magnet school that excels in student-guided education. Albuquerque High School also runs an evening school to help students get ahead.

== History ==
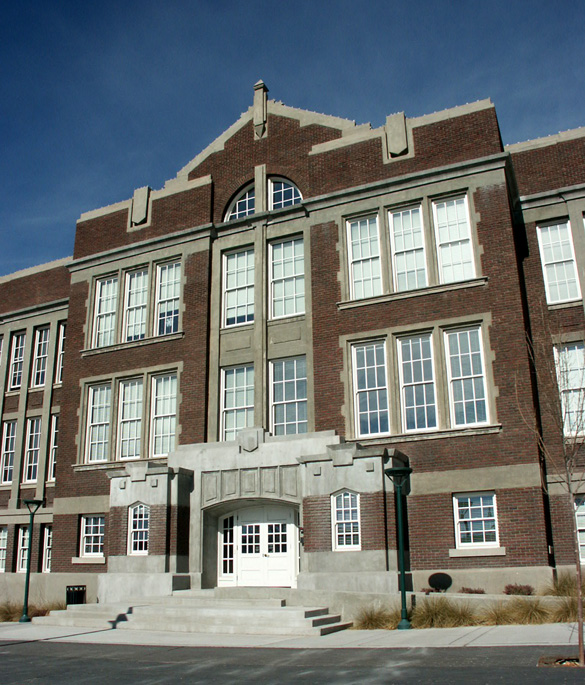
Old Albuquerque High

The school's origin can be traced back to the Albuquerque Academy (not to be confused with the present Albuquerque Academy founded in 1955). Colorado College of Colorado Springs started the Albuquerque Academy in 1879 on the east side of the old plaza. Thus were the beginnings of what was to become Albuquerque High. 27 students enrolled. In 1881; the academy moved to the new town into an adobe building on Lead between Third and Fourth. In 1882, it moved again, this time to Silver between Fifth and Sixth. The Academy was run by a seventeen-member board of trustees composed of business and professional men whose chief purpose seemed to be to give the town as good a school as possible.

In 1890 the academy moved into a new building at Central and Edith, where the public library is now located, and it operated there until 1891 when the city received the power to levy taxes for school funds. The whole operation was then taken over by the city, and Professor Hodgen was appointed the new city superintendent of schools. The school moved to the corner of Broadway and Central in 1914, which still stands today and is referred to as Old Albuquerque High School. It moved to its present location in the Martineztown-Santa Barbara neighborhood in 1974.

== Athletics ==
AHS competes in the New Mexico Activities Association (NMAA), as a class 6A school in District 5. In 2014, the NMAA realigned the state's schools in to six classifications and adjusted district boundaries. In addition to Albuquerque High School, the schools in District 5-6A include West Mesa High School, Rio Grande High School, Valley High School and Atrisco Heritage Academy High School.

State championships
Season	Sport	Number of championships	Year
Fall	Soccer, boys'	3	2019, 2017, 2015
Winter	Basketball, boys'	12	1998, 1995, 1993, 1990, 1984, 1977, 1971, 1946, 1937, 1925, 1922, 1921
Winter	Wrestling	6	1974, 1969, 1967, 1965, 1961, 1959
Winter	Spirit	4	2010, 2004, 2003, 2002
Spring	Baseball, boys'	10	1950, 1948, 1947, 1946, 1945, 1944, 1943, 1942, 1941, 1940
Spring	Golf, boys'	4	1978, 1963, 1959, 1958,
Spring	Golf, girls'	1	1979
Spring	Tennis, boys'	2	2000, 1997
Spring	Tennis, girls'	2	2015, 2016
Spring	Track and field, boys'	20	1960, 1950, 1948, 1946, 1945, 1944, 1943, 1941, 1940, 1937, 1936, 1934, 1925, 1923, 1922, 1921, 1920, 1917, 1916, 1913
Total		62	

== La Reata ==
La Reata is the name given to the official Albuquerque High School yearbook. Its first edition was printed in 1909. It was not until 1917 that the school began to teach printing, and in 1918 the first student-produced La Reata was printed. The 2013 edition was the 104th volume. La Reata is housed in the Albuquerque High School library but copies can also be found online.

== The Record of Albuquerque High School ==
The Record, the official Albuquerque High School student newspaper, is the oldest high school student publication in the state of New Mexico. It is published monthly and covers important school, regional, and national events, in addition to features, reviews, and opinion pieces relevant to students. For the 2009-2010 school year the paper was in its ninety-second volume. The Record operates its own website, independent of the Albuquerque High School website.

== Notable alumni ==
- Xzibit , Hip hop artist, Host of Tv show Pimp my ride.
- Mike Judge , Creator of Beavis & Butthead and King of the Hill.
- Rudolfo Anaya, author
- Janice Arnold-Jones, member of the New Mexico House of Representatives
- Clarence Bass, writer and bodybuilder
- Tom Benavidez, member of the New Mexico Senate
- Jeremiah Bitsui, actor
- Stanley J. Brasher, member of the New Mexico House of Representatives
- Greg Brown, basketball player
- Soledad C. Chacón, first female Secretary of State of New Mexico, and the first Hispanic woman elected statewide
- Ernest Chavez, member of the New Mexico House of Representatives
- John K. Davis, former Assistant Commandant of the United States Marine Corps
- Mel Dinelli, screenwriter
- Olivia Gatwood, poet
- Charles Hyder, astrophysicist
- Billy Jenkins, professional football player
- Floy Agnes Lee, Manhattan Project hematologist and scientist
- John Lewis, jazz pianist and founder of the Modern Jazz Quartet
- Dan A. McKinnon III, justice of the New Mexico Supreme Court
- Charles Moskos, sociologist
- Angie Reano Owen, jewelry artist
- Buster Quist, track and field athlete
- Alberto Sanchez, better known as musician Al Hurricane
- George I. Sánchez, president of the League of United Latin American Citizens
- Geno Silva, actor
- Kenny Thomas, professional basketball player
- Al Unser, Champ Car driver, Four-time Indy 500 winner
- Vivian Vance, entertainer
- E. S. Johnny Walker, US Congressman

== See also ==
- Old Albuquerque High School
- List of high schools in New Mexico
- Albuquerque Public Schools
