= Coronado Elementary School (Albuquerque, New Mexico) =

- Coronado Elementary School (listed as Coronado School)
- U.S. National Register of Historic Places
- NM State Register of Cultural Properties
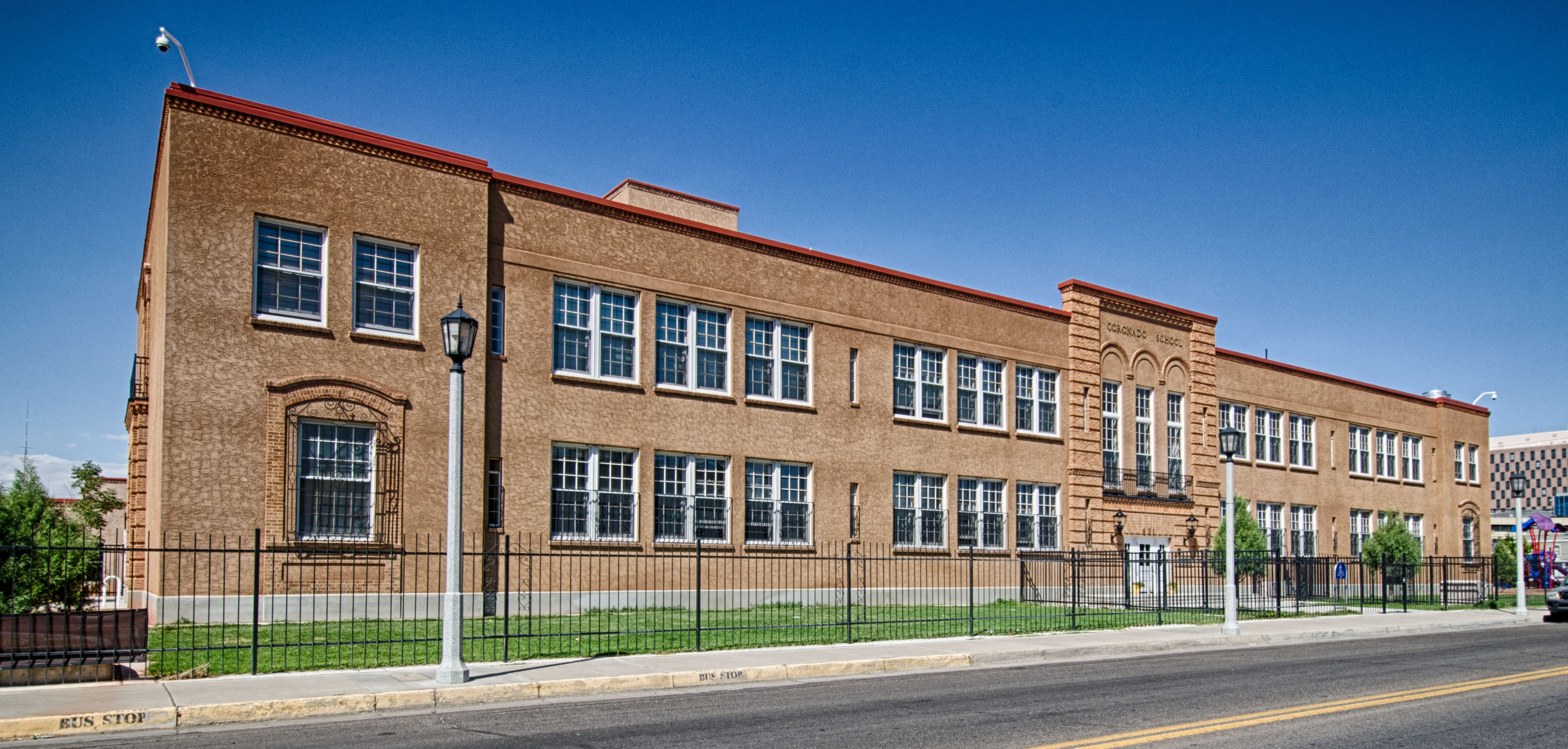

- Location within New Mexico Location within the United States
- Location: 601 4th St. SW, Albuquerque, New Mexico
- Coordinates: 35.07918°N 106.65294°W
- Area: Two acres
- Built: 1937
- Architect: Louis Hesselden
- Architectural style: Territorial
- NRHP reference No.: 96001383
- NMSRCP No.: 1644

Significant dates
- Added to NRHP: November 22, 1996
- Designated NMSRCP: September 27, 1996

Coronado Elementary School is a historic elementary school in the Barelas neighborhood of Albuquerque, New Mexico. Built in 1936–37 as a Public Works Administration project, it is the city's third-oldest operating elementary school. Coronado School was added to the New Mexico State Register of Cultural Properties and the National Register of Historic Places in 1996. It is a part of Albuquerque Public Schools.

== History ==
The school was built by the PWA at a cost of $125,000 and opened in 1937. It was designed by Louis G. Hesselden, who was the architect for Albuquerque Public Schools at the time. Coronado operated as an elementary school until 1975, when it was converted to administrative use.

In 2006, with Downtown Albuquerque experiencing a resurgence and existing inner-city schools becoming crowded, APS began exploring the possibility of reopening Coronado. After securing funding for this purpose, the district embarked on an $8.3 million project to return the school to service. This included restoring the main building to its original appearance and making it ADA-compliant, as well as adding a new gym, cafeteria, library, media center, and playground. Coronado Elementary officially reopened for the 2009–10 school year on August 24, 2009.
