= Second United Presbyterian Church =

Historic church in New Mexico, United States

- U.S. National Register of Historic Places
- NM State Register of Cultural Properties
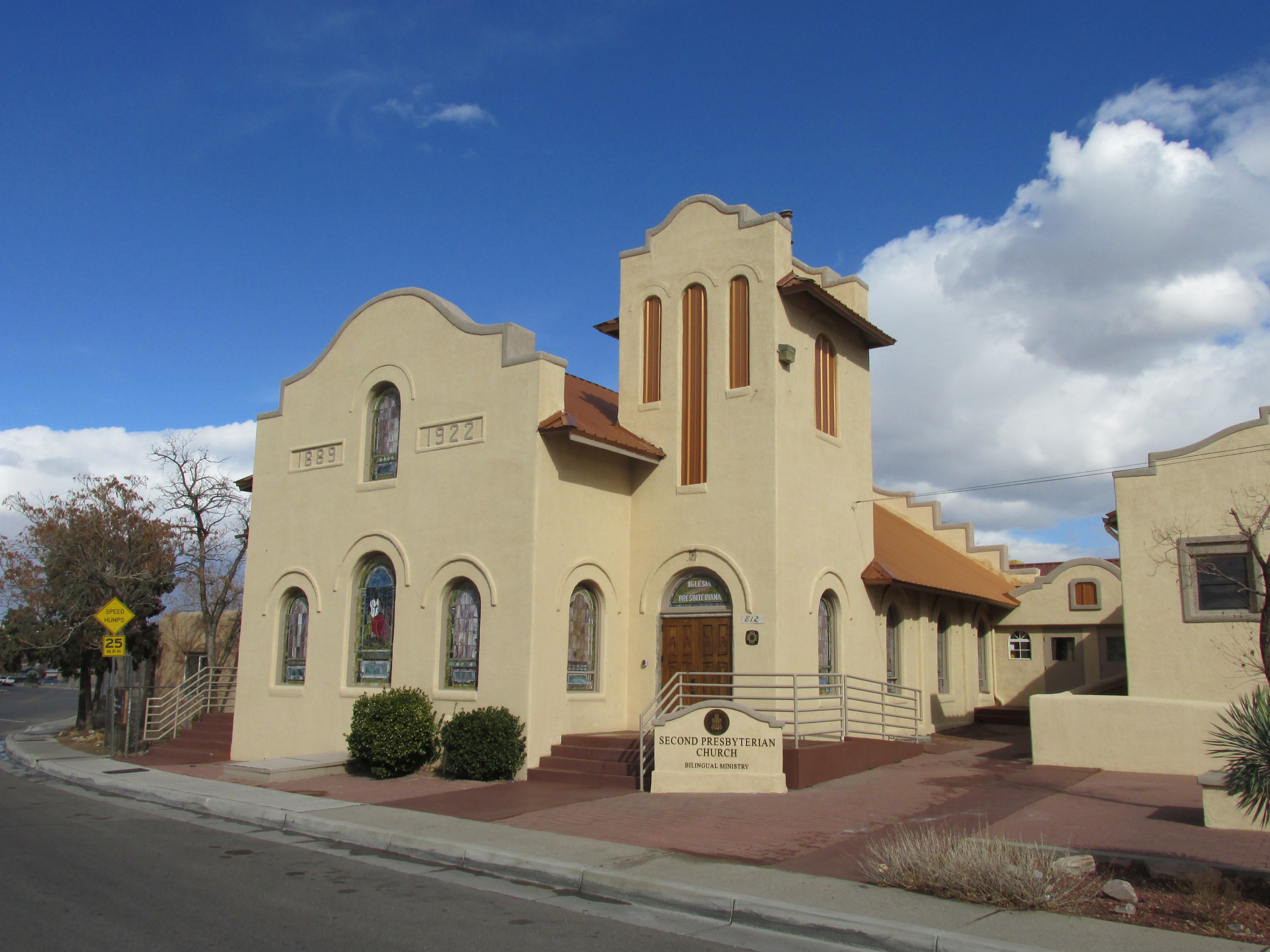
- Second United Presbyterian Church

- Location within New Mexico Location within the United States
- Location: 812 Edith Blvd., NE, Albuquerque, New Mexico
- Coordinates: 35°5′26″N 106°38′21″W
- Area: less than one acre
- Built: 1922
- Architects: Sawtelle, Marcus
- Architectural style: Mission Revival
- NRHP reference No.: 84000563
- NMSRCP No.: 1024

Significant dates
- Added to NRHP: December 6, 1984
- Designated NMSRCP: August 17, 1984

Second United Presbyterian Church (also known as La Segunda Iglesia Presbyteriana Unida; Second Church) is a historic Presbyterian church at 812 Edith Boulevard, NE in Albuquerque, New Mexico.

It was built in 1922 and added to the National Register of Historic Places in 1984.
