= Albuquerque Public Schools =

School district in New Mexico, US

Location
- Albuquerque, New Mexico United States

District information
- Motto: Expect great things!
- Grades: PreK - High School
- Established: 1891
- Superintendent: Dr. Gabriella Blakey (Since 2024)

Students and staff
- Students: 70,447 (2022–2023)
- Teachers: 5,027 (2022–2023)

Other information
- Website: www.aps.edu

Albuquerque Public Schools (APS) is a school district based in Albuquerque, New Mexico. Founded in 1891, APS is the largest of 89 public school districts in the state of New Mexico. In 2022 it had a total of 143 schools with some 70,000 students, making it one of the largest school districts in the United States. APS operates 88 elementary, 5 K-8, 28 middle, 20 high, 31 charter, and alternative schools. It also owns the radio station KANW and co-owns the TV station KNME-TV with the University of New Mexico.

APS serves a majority of Bernalillo County. Exceptions include Barton, the county's portion of Manzano Springs, and a section of Sedillo. APS also includes a portion of Sandoval County, where it serves Corrales.

== History ==
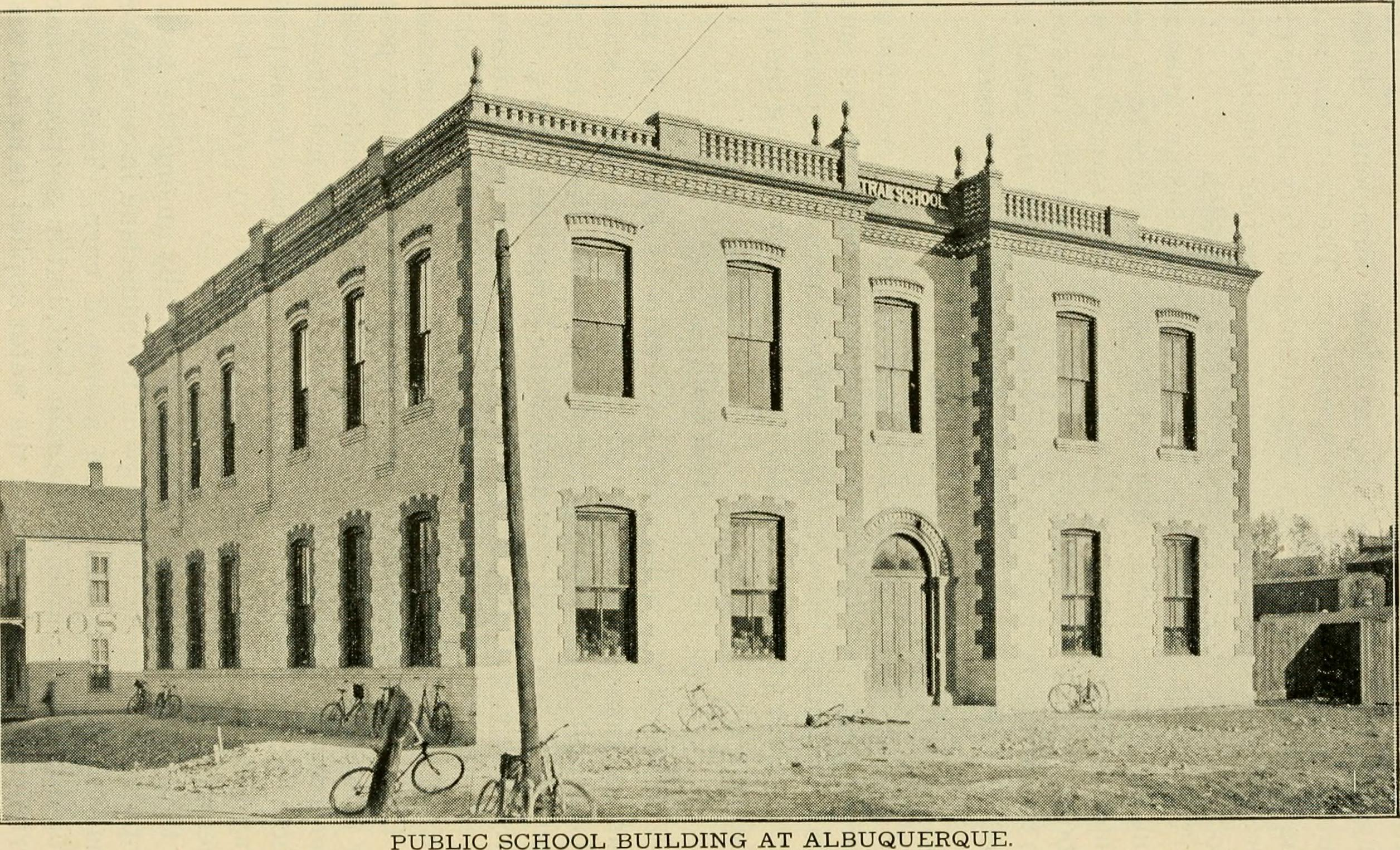
The Central School in 1904

Select schools

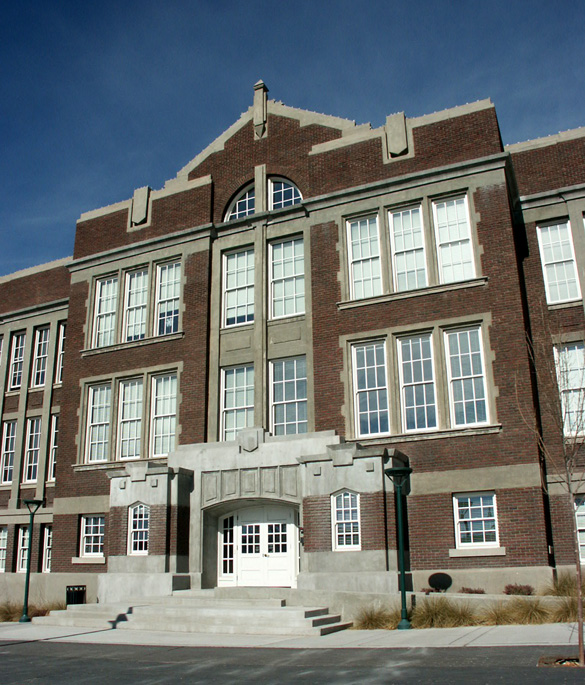
Old Albuquerque High School, opened 1914

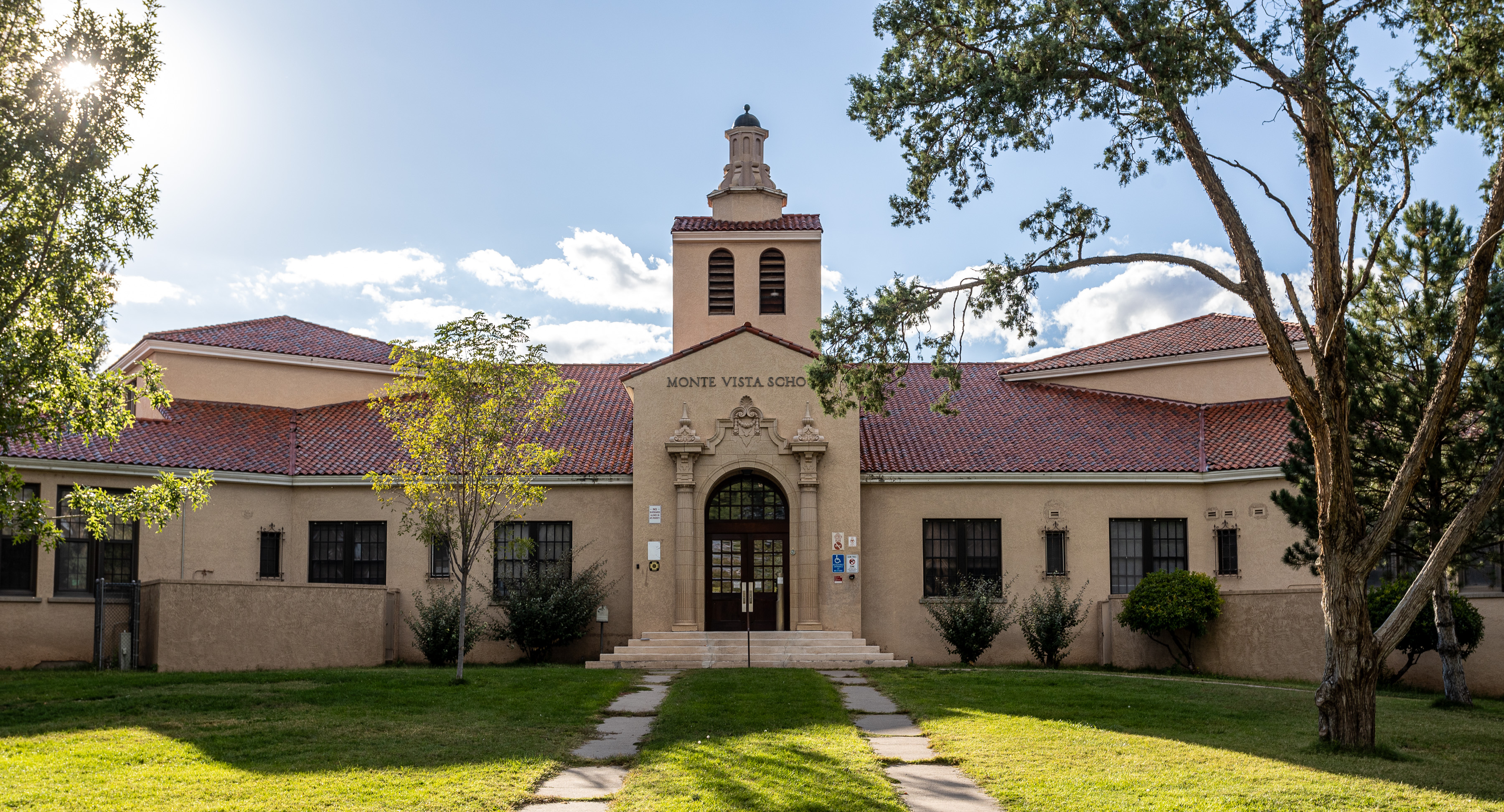
Monte Vista Elementary, opened 1931

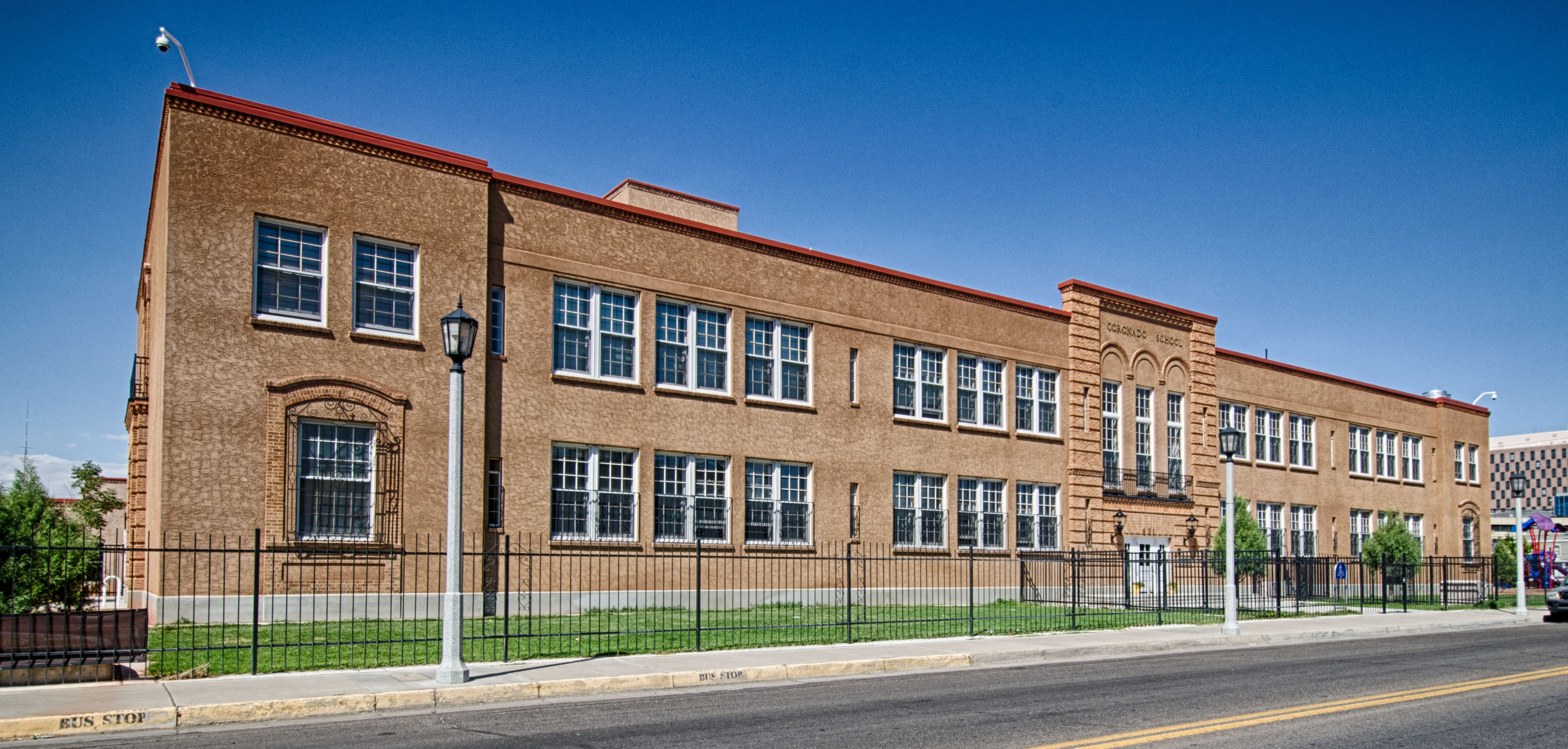
Coronado Elementary, opened 1937

Albuquerque Public Schools was founded in 1891, shortly after the New Mexico Territorial Legislature passed a new public education law authorizing municipalities to establish school boards and sell municipal bonds for school construction. The district acquired its first school by taking over the former Albuquerque Academy at Central and Edith, and classes began that fall. Primary schools were established in each of the city's four political wards in the early 1890s, and a new Central School for the upper grades opened in 1900. In 1911, the district appointed superintendent John Milne, who oversaw the school system until 1956 and was credited with much of its success.

With the city continuing to grow rapidly, a new high school building was constructed in 1914. Critics complained that the school was too large and would never reach its capacity of 500 students, but this proved not to be the case as a second building was required just 13 years later and the campus had grown to five buildings by 1940. In 1923 the district added two junior high schools, Washington and Lincoln, and two elementary schools at the expanding fringes of the city, John Marshall in the south and University Heights in the east. The outdated old ward schools were phased out between 1927 and 1937, to be replaced by Longfellow, Eugene Field, Coronado, and Lew Wallace elementary schools, respectively. The district continued to expand with the city's growth to the east, adding Monte Vista Elementary in 1931, Jefferson Junior High in 1938, and Bandelier Elementary in 1939.

Albuquerque's population exploded in the postwar era, and APS had to add new schools continuously to keep up, including the city's second high school, Highland, in 1949. APS also took over the Bernalillo County public school system that same year, bringing in schools in the older rural communities along the Rio Grande valley and in the mountains. In 1956 the district boasted 39,000 students and 67 schools, the two most distant of which were 52 miles (84 km) apart. Declining enrollments saw several inner-city schools closed in the 1970s, and Albuquerque High moved to a new location farther from Downtown. Nevertheless, the district as a whole continued to grow, and more recent demographic shifts have seen Coronado and Lew Wallace elementary schools reopen. In 1994, five schools in the suburb of Rio Rancho were transferred to the new Rio Rancho Public Schools district. In 2010, APS recorded nearly 100,000 students.

== Schools ==
As of 2023, APS operates 88 elementary schools (grades K–5), 5 grades K-8 schools, 28 middle schools (grades 6–8), 20 high schools (grades 9–12), 31 charter schools (grades vary). The following list is adapted from the APS website.

=== High schools ===
School	Mascot	Location	Enrollment	Opened
Albuquerque	Bulldogs	800 Odelia Rd. NE	1741	1914
Atrisco Heritage	Jaguars	10800 Dennis Chavez Blvd. SW	2476	2008
Cibola	Cougars	1510 Ellison Dr. NW	1859	1976
Del Norte	Knights	5323 Montgomery Blvd. NE	1264	1964
Eldorado	Eagles	11300 Montgomery Blvd. NE	1917	1970
Highland	Hornets	4700 Coal Avenue. SE	1316	1949
La Cueva	Bears	7801 Wilshire Ave. NE	1897	1986
Manzano	Monarchs	12200 Lomas Blvd. NE	1843	1960
Rio Grande	Ravens	2300 Arenal Rd. SW	1618	1959
Sandia	Matadors	7801 Candelaria Rd. NE	1956	1958
Valley	Vikings	1505 Candelaria Rd. NW	1371	1954
Volcano Vista	Hawks	8100 Rainbow Rd. NW	2238	2007
West Mesa	Mustangs	6701 Fortuna Rd. NW	1654	1966

=== Middle schools ===
School	Mascot	Location	Enrollment	Opened	Notes
Cleveland	Colts	6910 Natalie Ave. NE	671	1962	
Desert Ridge	Diamondbacks	8400 Barstow St. NE	1045	1997	
Eisenhower	Generals	11001 Camero Ave. NE	889	1975	
Ernie Pyle	Warriors	1820 Valdora Ave. SW	692	1948	Annexed from Bernalillo County District 6 in 1949
Garfield	Gray Wolves	3501 6th St. NW	349	1951	
Grant	Eagles	1111 Easterday Dr. NE	627	1961	
Harrison	Roadrunners	3912 Isleta Blvd. SW	987	1960	
Hayes	Huskies	1100 Texas St. NE	379	1963	
Hoover	Hawks	12015 Tivoli Ave. NE	686	1966	
Jackson	Jaguars	10600 Indian School Rd. NE	596	1958	
James Monroe	Raptors	6100 Paradise Blvd. NW	981	2001	
Jefferson	Jets	712 Girard Blvd. NE	918	1938	
Jimmy Carter	Cavaliers	8901 Bluewater Rd. NW	1345	2000	
John Adams	Panthers	5401 Glenrio Rd. NW	713	1956	
Kennedy	Cougars	721 Tomasita St. NE	519	1967	
L.B. Johnson	Coyotes	6811 Taylor Ranch Dr. NW	926	1992	
Madison	Magic (Formerly Mohawks)	3501 Moon St. NE	757	1959	
McKinley	Comets	4500 Comanche Rd. NE	640	1956	
Polk	Patriots	2220 Raymac Rd. SW	460	1968	
Roosevelt	Rams	11799 South Highway 14, Tijeras	357	1950	
Taylor	Thunderbirds	8200 Guadalupe Trl. NW	511	1964	
Tony Hillerman	Thunder	8101 Rainbow Blvd. NW	915	2009	
Truman	Tigers	9400 Benavides Rd. SW	1437	1975	
Van Buren	Falcons	700 Louisiana Blvd. SE	604	1960	
Washington	Raiders	1101 Park Ave. SW	513	1923	
Wilson	Wildcats	1138 Cardenas Dr. SE	545	1953	

=== Elementary schools ===
School	Mascot	Location	Enrollment	Opened	Notes
7 Bar	Wranglers	4501 Seven Bar Loop NW	861	2002	
A. Montoya	Mountain Lions	24 Public School Rd., Tijeras	332	1948	Annexed from Bernalillo County District 7 in 1949
Adobe Acres	Thunderbirds	1724 Camino Del Valle SW	565	1964	
Alameda	Mustangs	412 Alameda Blvd. NW	255	1913	Annexed from Bernalillo County District 3 in 1949
Alamosa	Bobcats	6500 Sunset Gardens Rd. SW	679	1959	
Alvarado	All Stars	1100 Solar Rd. NW	405	1948	Annexed from Bernalillo County District 3 in 1949
Apache	Coyotes	12800 Copper St. NE	427	1967	
Armijo	Roadrunners	1440 Gatewood Rd. SW	393	1914	Formerly Ranchos de Atrisco, Old Armijo. Annexed from Bernalillo County District 6 in 1949. Moved to current location in 1960; former building still standing at 1021 Isleta Blvd. SW
Arroyo Del Oso	Bears	6504 Harper Dr. NE	425	1974	Permanent location opened 1975; previously occupied a temporary facility at Monroe Junior High
Atrisco	Panthers	1201 Atrisco Rd. SW	337	1918	Annexed from Bernalillo County District 6 in 1949
Bandelier	Banda Bears	3309 Pershing St. SE	549	1939	
Barcelona	Bobcats	2311 Barcelona Rd. SW	541	1936	Formerly Atrisco Annex; annexed from Bernalillo County District 6 in 1949
Bel-Air	Bengals	4725 Candelaria Rd. NE	385	1952	
Bellehaven	Bobcats	8701 Princess Jeanne Ave. NE	330	1966	
Carlos Rey	Coyotes	1215 Cerrillos Rd. SW	748	1959	
Chamiza	Jackrabbits	5401 Homestead Cir. NW	582	1995	
Chaparral	Roadrunners	6325 Milne Rd. NW	912	1964	Originally located at 5401 Glenrio Rd. NW
Chelwood	Cheetahs	12701 Constitution Ave. NE	608	1968	
Cochiti	Cougars	3100 San Isidro Rd. NW	289	1961	
Collet Park	Roadrunners	2100 Morris St. NE	351	1961	
Comanche	Cubs	3505 Pennsylvania St. NE	413	1966	Original mascot was Cougars, later switched to Cool Kids, then Cubs.
Coronado	Caballeros	601 4th St. SW	279	1937	Closed 1975–2009
Corrales	Cubs	200 Target Rd., Corrales	456	1923	Formerly Sandoval. Annexed by APS in 1956
Dennis Chavez	Panthers	7500 Barstow St. NE	660	1978	
Dolores Gonzales	Tigers	900 Atlantic St. SW	419	1975	
Double Eagle	Eagles	8901 Lowell Dr. NE	507	1996	
Duranes	Tigers	2436 Zickert Rd. NW	340	c. 1900	Annexed from Bernalillo County district c. 1947
E.G. Ross	Rams	6700 Palomas Ave. NE	498	1983	
East San Jose	Conquistadores	415 Thaxton Ave. SE	588	1908	Formerly San Jose; annexed from Bernalillo County District 1 in 1949
Edward Gonzales	Pandas	554 90th St. SW	675	2004	
Emerson	Eagles	620 Georgia St. SE	387	1952	
Eugene Field	Bullpups	700 Edith Blvd. SE	380	1927	
Georgia O'Keeffe	Rams	11701 San Victorio Ave. NE	611	1989	
Governor Bent	Cougars	5700 Hendrix Rd. NE	553	1963	
Griegos	Mustangs	4040 San Isidro St. NW	365	1915	Formerly Griegos-Candelarias; annexed from Bernalillo County District 3 in 1949
H. Humphrey	Hawks	9801 Academy Hills Dr. NE	480	1978	
Hawthorne	Dragons	420 General Somervell St. NE	499	1954	
Helen Cordero		8800 Eucariz Ave. SW	836	2009	
Hodgin	Hawks	3801 Morningside Dr. NE	600	1956	Permanent location opened 1958; previously occupied a temporary facility at Bel-Air Elementary
Inez	Rockets	1700 Pennsylvania St. NE	461	1952	
John Baker	Bobcats	12015-B Tivoli Ave. NE	550	1966	Formerly Aspen
Kirtland	Eagles	3530 Gibson Blvd. SE	371	1961	
Kit Carson	Eagles	1921 Byron Ave. SW	546	1940	Formerly New Armijo; annexed from Bernalillo County district c. 1949. Moved to current location in 1970; former building still standing at 1730 Valdora Ave. SW
La Mesa	Wildcats	7500 Copper Ave. NE	744	c. 1938	Annexed from Bernalillo County district c. 1947. Originally located near Louisiana and Copper NE; moved to current location in 1940
Lavaland	Volcanoes	501 57th St. NW	654	1946	Annexed from Bernalillo County District 6 in 1949
Lew Wallace	Bear Cubs	513 6th St. NW	298	1934	Closed 1974–1992
Longfellow	Prairie Dogs	400 Edith Blvd. NE	310	1927	
Los Padillas	Roadrunners	2525 Los Padillas Rd. SW	280	1912	Annexed from Bernalillo County District 6 in 1949. Moved to present location in 1965; former campus at 7325 Isleta Blvd. SW demolished
Los Ranchos	Roadrunners	7609 4th St. NW	362	1914	Annexed from Bernalillo County District 3 in 1949
Lowell	Unicorns	1700 Sunshine Terrace SE	396	1954	
M.A. Binford	Bears	1400 Corriz Dr. SW	909	1984	
MacArthur	Monarchs	1100 MacArthur Rd. NW	256	1948	Annexed from Bernalillo County District 3 in 1948
Manzano Mesa	Meerkats	801 Elizabeth St. SE	736	2004	
Marie M. Hughes	Huskies	5701 Mojave St. NW	608	1981	
Mark Twain	Frogs	6316 Constitution Ave. NE	374	1954	
Matheson Park	Mustangs	10809 Lexington St. NE	316	1967	
McCollum	Mustangs	10900 San Jacinto Ave. NE	344	1961	
Mission Avenue	Thunderbirds	725 Mission Ave. NE	437	1953	
Mitchell	Mustangs	10121 Comanche Rd. NE	431	1962	
Monte Vista	Penguins	3211 Monte Vista Blvd. NE	506	1931	
Montezuma	Cougars	3100 Indian School Rd. NE	516	1953	
Mountain View	Mountain Lions	5317 2nd St. SW	409	1909	Annexed from Bernalillo County District 1 in 1949
Navajo	Osos	2936 Hughes Rd. SW	690	1967	
North Star	Wolves	9301 Ventura St. NE	745	2005	
Onate	Coyotes	12415 Brentwood Hills Blvd. NE	227	1973	Mascot was previously Bulldogs (circa 1990)
Osuna	Tigers	4715 Moon St. NE	447	1968	
Painted Sky	Coyotes	8101 Gavin Dr. NW	1047	1998	
Pajarito	Eagles	2701 Don Felipe Rd. SW	608	1918	Annexed from Bernalillo County District 6 in 1949. Moved to current location in 1993; former campus still standing at 5816 Isleta Blvd. SW
Petroglyph	Macaws	5100 Marna Lynn Ave. NW	743	1992	
Reginald Chavez	Tigers	2700 Mountain Rd. NW	359	1904	Formerly Old Town; annexed from Bernalillo County district c. 1947. Originally located at 115 Rio Grande Blvd. NW; moved to current location in 1955. Former building demolished c. 1955
Rudolfo Anaya	Jackalopes	2800 Vermejo Park Dr. SW	797	2009	
S.R. Marmon	Lobos	1800 72nd St. NW	866	1989	
S.Y. Jackson	Jaguars	4720 Cairo Dr. NE	572	1971	
San Antonito	Roadrunners	12555 North Hwy. 14, Sandia Park	296	1958	
Sandia Base	Mustangs	21001 Wyoming Blvd. SE; Kirtland Air Force Base Building #21000	493	1949	
Sierra Vista	Scorpions	10220 Paseo del Norte NW	773	1966	
Sombra Del Monte	Roadrunners	9110 Shoshone Rd. NE	390	1954	
Sunset View	Mountain Lions	6121 Paradise Blvd. NW	550	2009	
Tierra Antigua	Firebirds	8121 Rainbow Blvd. NW	841	2009	
Tomasita	Tigers	701 Tomasita St. NE	388	1965	
Valle Vista	Vikings	1700 Mae Ave. SW	591	1952	
Ventana Ranch	Roadrunners	6801 Ventana Village Rd. NW	784	2004	
Wherry	Rockets	Building #25000- KAFB East	525	1952	
Whittier	Lions	1110 Quincy St. SE	458	1949	
Zia	Eagles	440 Jefferson St. NE	391	1949	
Zuni	Eagles	6300 Claremont Ave. NE	420	1958	Permanent location opened 1960; previously occupied a temporary facility at Bel-Air Elementary

=== Charter schools ===
School name	School Address	Grades
ABQ Charter Academy	405 Dr. Martin Luther King Jr. Ave., 87102	9–12
ACE Leadership High School	1240 Bellamah Ave. NW, 87104	9–12
Albuquerque Talent Development Academy	1800 Atrisco Rd NW, 87120	9–12
Alice King Community	8100 Mountain Rd. NE, 87110	K–8
Christine Duncan Heritage Academy	1900 Atrisco Dr. NW, 87120	PreK–8
Cien Aguas International	2000 Randolph SE, 87106	K–8
Coral Community Charter School	4401 Silver Avenue NE, 87108	PreK–6
Corrales International School	5500 Wilshire Ave. NE, 87113	K–12
Digital Arts and Technology Academy	1011 Lamberton Place NE, 87107	7–12
East Mountain High School	25 La Madera Rd., Sandia Park 87047	9–12
El Camino Real Academy	3713 Isleta Blvd. SW, 87105	K–12
Gilbert L. Sena Charter High School	69 Hotel Circle NE, 87123	9–12
Gordon Bernell	401 Roma NW, 87102	9–12
Health Leadership High School	1900 Randolph Rd. SE, 87106	9–12
International School at Mesa del Sol	2660 Eastman Crossing SE, 87106	PreK–12
La Academia de Esperanza	1401 Old Coors Rd. SW, 87121	6–12
Los Puentes	4012 4th St. NW, 87107	7–12
Mark Armijo Academy	6800 Gonzales Rd. SW, 87121	9–12
Montessori of the Rio Grande	1650 Gabaldon Drive NW, 87104	PreK–6
Mountain Mahogany	5014 4th St NW, 87107	K–8
Native American Community Academy	1000 Indian School Road, 87104	K–12
New America School - New Mexico	1734 Isleta Blvd SW, 87105	9–12
New Mexico International	7215 Montgomery Blvd NE, 87109	K–6
Public Academy for Performing Arts	11800 Princess Jeanne Ave NE, 87112	6–12
Robert F Kennedy	4300 Blake Road SW, 87121	6–12
Siembra Leadership High School	606 Central Rd. SW, 87102	9–12
South Valley Academy	3426 Blake SW, 87105	6–12
Technology Leadership High School	10500 Research RD SE, 87123	9–12
VOZ Collegiate Preparatory Charter School	955 San Pedro Drive SE, 87108	6–8
William W. & Josephine Dorn Community	1119 Edith SE, 87102	K–5

=== Alternative schools ===
- ABQ Charter Academy
- Amy Biehl Charter School
- Career Enrichment Center
- Coyote Willow Family Magnet School K-8
- Desert Willow Family School K-8
- eCADEMY High School
- Family School
- Freedom High School
- George I. Sanchez Collaborative Community K-8
- Janet Kahn School of Integrated Arts K-8
- Juvenile Detention Center Educational Unit
- La Academia de Esperanza
- New Futures School
- Nex+Gen Academy (Project-based Learning magnet)
- School On Wheels
- Stronghurst Alternative
- Transition Services High School
- Tres Volcanes Community Collaborative K-8
- Vision Quest Alternative Middle School

=== Former schools ===
School	Location	Opened	Closed	Notes
Acoma Elementary	11800 Princess Jeanne Ave. NE	1958	2016	Permanent location opened 1959; previously occupied a temporary facility at Princess Jeanne park
Aztec Elementary	2611 Eubank Blvd. NE	1957	1975	Currently APS Aztec Complex
Carnuel School	Carnuel	c. 1900	1955	Annexed from Bernalillo County District 7 in 1949
Cedro School	Cedro	c. 1900	c. 1950	Annexed from Bernalillo County District 7 in 1949
Central School	221 Lead Ave. SW	1900	1937	Used as administrative headquarters until 1952; later demolished
Chilili School	Chilili	c. 1900	1961	Annexed from Bernalillo County District 7 in 1949
Cortez Elementary	5200 Cutler Ave. NE	1951	1982	Currently Freedom High School
Embudo Elementary	1100 Texas St. NE	1963	1974	Absorbed into Hayes Middle School
Ernest Stapleton Elementary	4477 9th Ave. SE, Rio Rancho	1990	n/a	Transferred to Rio Rancho Public Schools in 1994; now Shining Stars Preschool
Escabosa School	Escabosa	c. 1900	1957	Annexed from Bernalillo County District 7 in 1949
First Ward School	400 Edith Blvd. NE	c. 1892	c. 1927	Replaced by Longfellow Elementary; later demolished
Five Points Elementary	129 Hartline Rd. SW	1931	1974	Annexed from Bernalillo County District 6 in 1949; currently School on Wheels
Fourth Ward School	513 6th St. NW	c. 1892	1933	Burned in 1933; replaced by Lew Wallace Elementary
John Marshall Elementary	1500 Walter St. SE	1923	1975	Currently used by City of Albuquerque
Juan Tomas School	Juan Tomas	c. 1900	1957	Annexed from Bernalillo County District 7 in 1949
Laguna Elementary	8200 Guadalupe Trl. NW	1964	1973	Absorbed into Taylor Middle School
Larrazolo Elementary	2008 Larrazolo St. SW	1968	1982	Demolished
Lincoln Junior High	912 Locust St. SE	1923	1974	Currently APS Lincoln Complex
Lincoln Middle	2287 Lema Rd. SE, Rio Rancho	1983	n/a	Transferred to Rio Rancho Public Schools in 1994
Los Altos Elementary	1111 Easterday Dr. NE	1961	1974	Absorbed into Grant Middle School
Martin Luther King Jr. Elementary	1301 27th Ave. SE, Rio Rancho	1986	n/a	Transferred to Rio Rancho Public Schools in 1994
Monroe Junior High	2120 Louisiana Blvd. NE	1953	1974	Later New Futures School; demolished in 1988
Montgomery Elementary	3315 Louisiana Blvd. NE	1956	1982	Later APS Montgomery Complex; demolished in 2016
North Fourth Elementary	1608 4th St. NW	1912	c. 1952	Annexed from Bernalillo County District 13 in 1928. Used as administrative offices in the 1950s; later demolished
Puesta del Sol Elementary	1100 Hood Rd. SE, Rio Rancho	1983	n/a	Transferred to Rio Rancho Public Schools in 1994; now St. Thomas Aquinas School
Rio Rancho Elementary	4601 Pepe Ortiz Rd. SE, Rio Rancho	1974	n/a	Transferred to Rio Rancho Public Schools in 1994
Riverview Elementary	1701 4th St. SW	1937	1975	Formerly West San Jose; annexed from Bernalillo County District 1 in 1949. Currently part of the National Hispanic Cultural Center
Santa Barbara Elementary	1420 Edith Blvd. NE	1908	1971	Annexed from Bernalillo County District 13 c. 1947. Currently used by City of Albuquerque
Second Ward School	700 Edith Blvd. SE	c. 1892	1927	Demolished; replaced by Eugene Field Elementary
Stronghurst Elementary	120 Woodland Ave. NW	1931	1975	Annexed from Bernalillo County District 13 c. 1947. Later APS Stronghurst Complex; demolished in 2009
Third Ward School	408 Iron Ave. SW	c. 1892	1936	Demolished; replaced by Coronado Elementary
Toltec Elementary	3831 Morris St. NE	1968	1969	
University Heights Elementary	525 Buena Vista Dr. SE	1923	1962	Currently part of Central New Mexico Community College
Yrisarri School	Yrisarri	c. 1900	1957	Annexed from Bernalillo County District 7 in 1949
Yucca Elementary	8200 Dellwood Rd. NE	1958	1974	Permanent location opened c. 1960; previously occupied a temporary facility at Sombra del Monte Elementary. Currently the Yucca Annex at Sandia High
