= San Ignacio Church, Albuquerque =

Historic church in New Mexico, United States

- San Ignacio Church
- U.S. National Register of Historic Places
- NM State Register of Cultural Properties
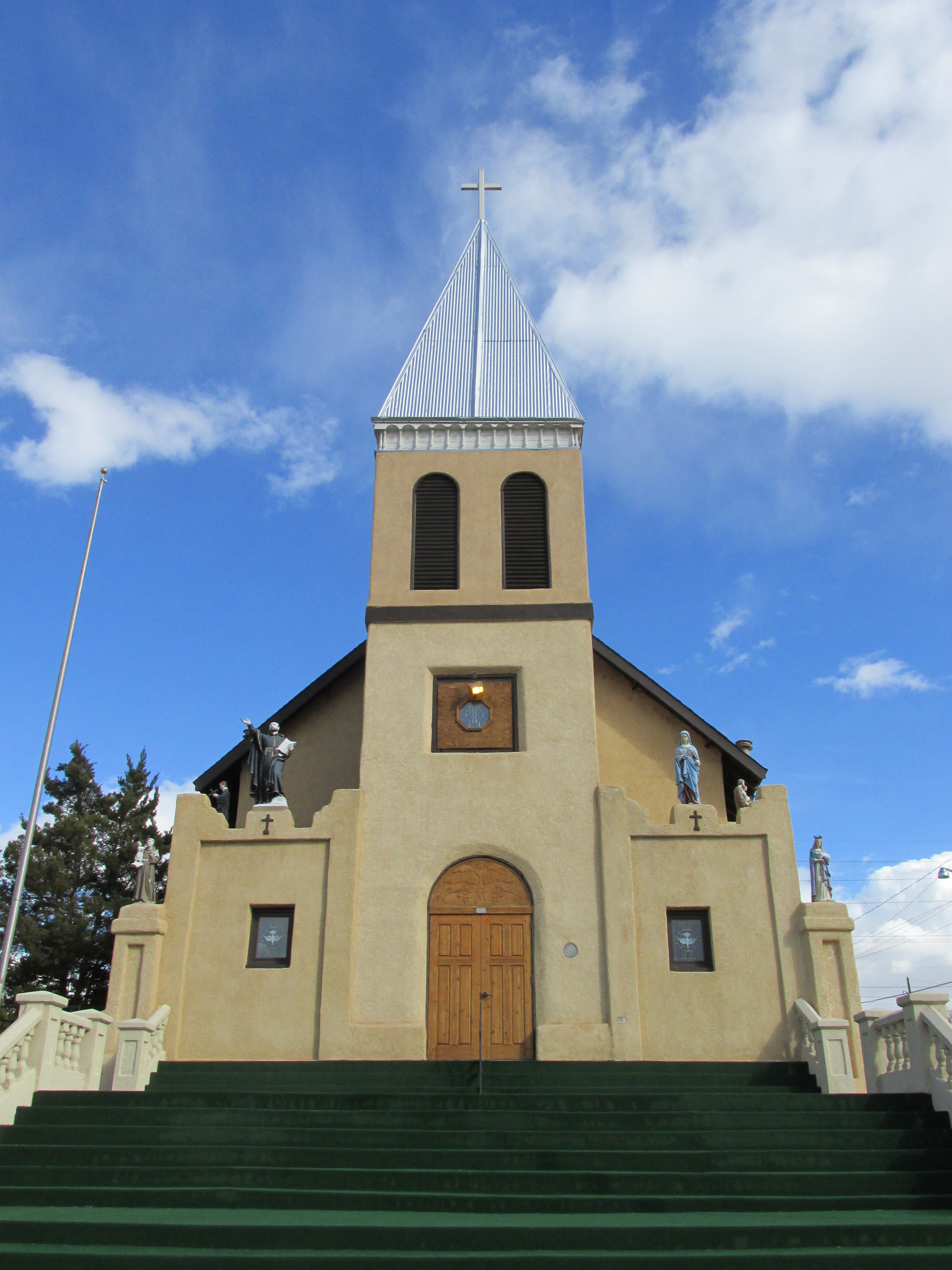
- San Ignacio Church

- Location within New Mexico Location within the United States
- Location: 1300 Walter St., NE, Albuquerque, New Mexico
- Coordinates: 35°5′43″N 106°38′15″W
- Area: 0.5 acres (0.20 ha)
- Built: 1916
- NRHP reference No.: 79001536
- NMSRCP No.: 520

Significant dates
- Added to NRHP: August 21, 1979
- Designated NMSRCP: August 24, 1977

San Ignacio Church is a historic Catholic church at 1300 Walter St., NE in Albuquerque, New Mexico.

It was built in 1916 and was added to the National Register in 1979.
