= Monte Vista Elementary School (Albuquerque, New Mexico) =

- U.S. National Register of Historic Places
- NM State Register of Cultural Properties
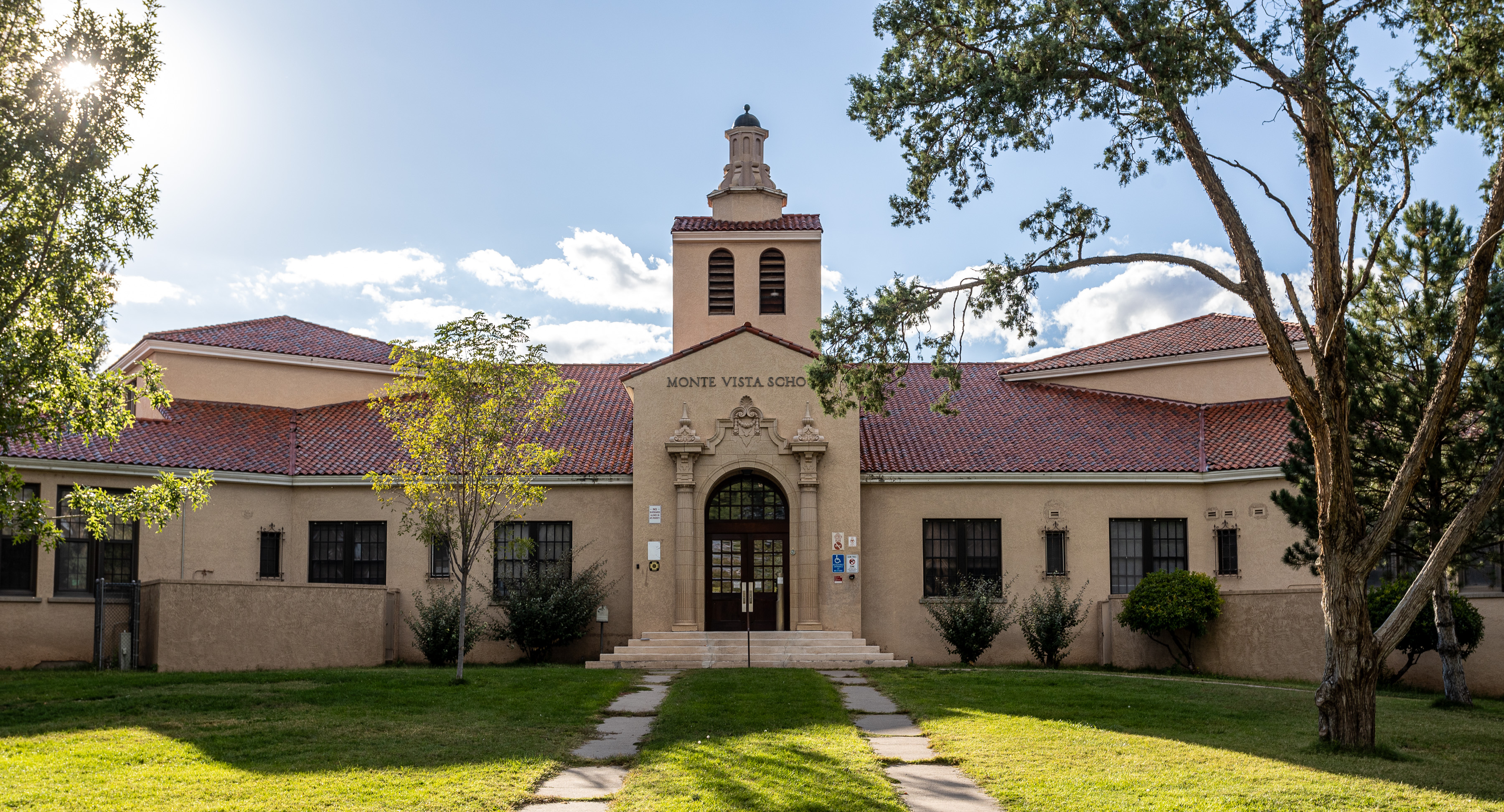

- Location within New Mexico Location within the United States
- Location: 3211 Monte Vista Blvd. NE, Albuquerque, New Mexico
- Coordinates: 35°04′58″N 106°36′35″W
- Built: 1931
- Architect: T. Charles Gaastra
- Architectural style: Mediterranean Revival
- NRHP reference No.: 81000399
- NMSRCP No.: 830

Significant dates
- Added to NRHP: August 12, 1981
- Designated NMSRCP: June 26, 1981

Monte Vista Elementary School is a public elementary school in the Nob Hill neighborhood of Albuquerque, New Mexico, whose campus is listed in the New Mexico State Register of Cultural Properties and the National Register of Historic Places. It is notable as one of the city's best examples of Mediterranean Revival architecture and as the historical focal point of the surrounding neighborhood. It is a part of Albuquerque Public Schools.

== History ==
In the 1920s and 30s Albuquerque was undergoing rapid development along Central Avenue in the area then known as the East Mesa, the high ground just east of the present alignment of Interstate 25. One of the new developments was the Monte Vista Addition, which was laid out in 1926 leaving room for a future elementary school at the intersection of two diagonal boulevards, Monte Vista and Campus. Albuquerque Public Schools originally planned to build a ten-classroom school, but scaled the plans back to eight classrooms to cut costs. The school was budgeted at $77,500 and was designed by local architect T. Charles Gaastra, who also designed the nearby Hendren Building some years later.

Monte Vista opened to the public on February 1, 1931, and has remained in use for its original purpose ever since. A 1947 addition extended the wings at the rear of the building, adding more classrooms to keep up with increasing enrollment. A separate cafeteria building was added in 1965. In 1981, the school was added to the New Mexico State Register of Cultural Properties and the National Register of Historic Places.

== Architecture ==
The historic main building at Monte Vista was designed by local architect T. Charles Gaastra in the Mediterranean Revival style. The plan is complex but carefully aligned with respect to the wedge-shaped corner of Monte Vista and Campus Boulevards. The school has four classroom wings projecting from a central block punctuated by an arched front entrance, elaborately ornamented with molded terra cotta, and a square tower with a domed cupola. Shallowly pitched tile roofs and tan stuccoed walls complete the Mediterranean appearance. The rear of the building, including the 1947 additions, has two stories, while the front has one. The windows used are generally 6-over-6 sashes.
