= Hendren Building =

- U.S. National Register of Historic Places
- NM State Register of Cultural Properties
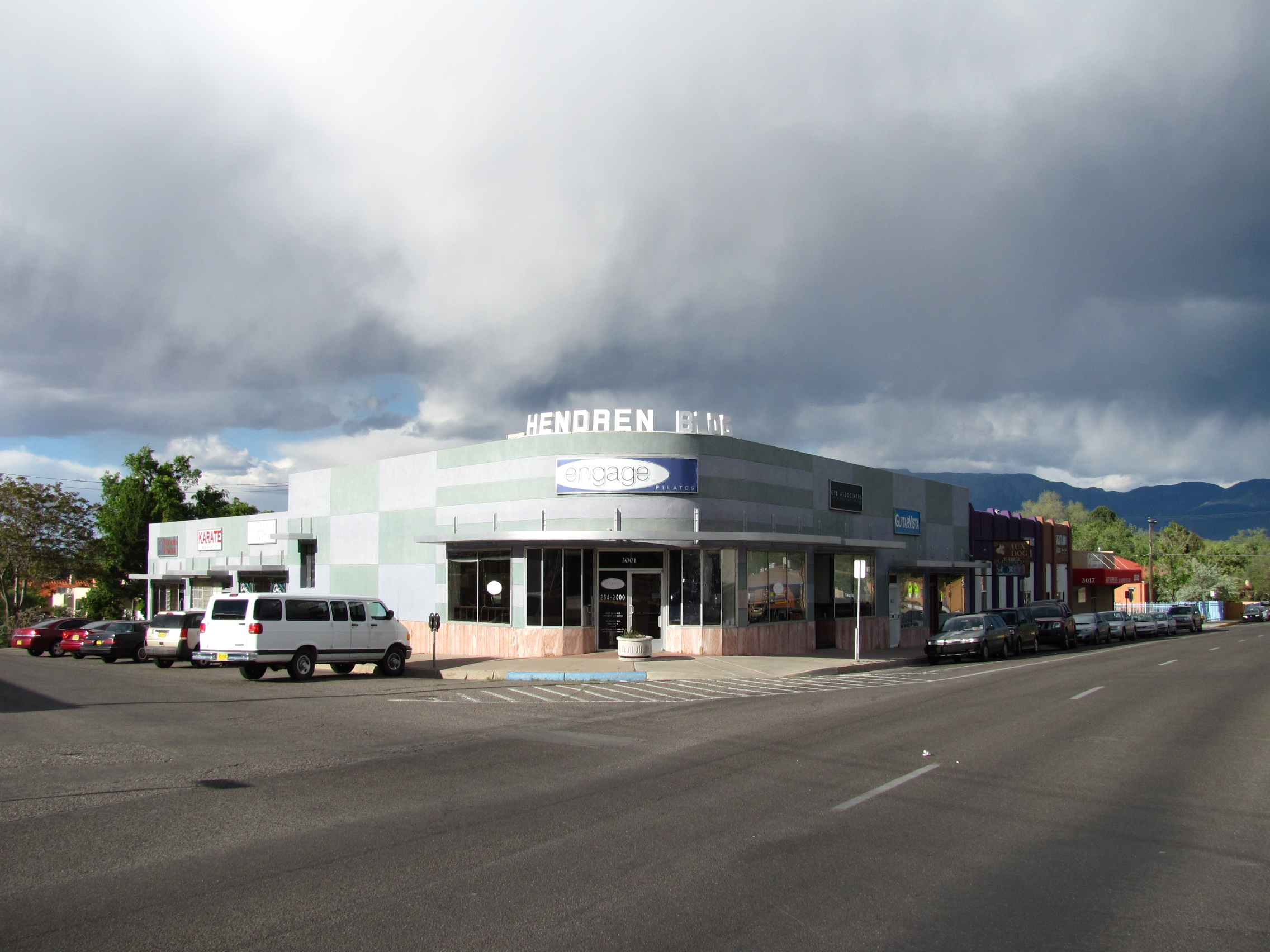
- Hendren Building, May 2010

- Location within New Mexico Location within the United States
- Location: 3001 Monte Vista Blvd. NE; Albuquerque, New Mexico
- Coordinates: 35°05′00″N 106°36′43″W
- Built: 1946
- Architect: T. Charles Gaastra
- Architectural style: Streamline Moderne
- NRHP reference No.: 99001678
- NMSRCP No.: 1787

Significant dates
- Added to NRHP: January 27, 2000
- Designated NMSRCP: November 19, 1999

The Hendren Building is a historic commercial building in the Nob Hill neighborhood of Albuquerque, New Mexico. Built in 1946, it is one of the city's most notable examples of Streamline Moderne architecture, and representative of the boom in automobile-oriented commercial development in the immediate post-war period. The building was one of the last completed works by architect T. Charles Gaastra. It was added to the New Mexico State Register of Cultural Properties in 1999 and the National Register of Historic Places in 2000.

== History ==
The Hendren Building was constructed in 1946 by J.L. Hendren, a local grocery store owner who saw the potential for further commercial development in the rapidly growing Nob Hill area. At the time, the city was expanding further away from the downtown core, and residents of the new developments wanted shops and businesses nearer their homes. In particular, Hendren believed a building containing doctors' offices and a pharmacy would be welcomed by area residents. Hendren commissioned T. Charles Gaastra to design the building, which ended up being one of the architect's last works before his death in 1947. Supposedly the Streamline Moderne design was based on a photograph Hendren had seen of a building on a similarly shaped lot somewhere in the Midwest. Construction began in early 1946 and lasted approximately nine months.

Hendren's venture proved successful, and the property was fully leased within a year. The initial tenants of the building included a pharmacy, an electrical supply company, a luggage shop, and doctors' offices. The Hendren Building has housed a number of businesses over the years but remains in use for its original purpose as of 2015. The building was remodeled in the early 2000s, removing the black Carrara Glass cladding among other modifications.

== Architecture ==
The Hendren Building is a one-story, flat-roofed commercial block located on the acute corner formed by Dartmouth Drive and Monte Vista Boulevard. The building is V-shaped with wings extending along both streets, containing a number of small commercial spaces. The building's strongly horizontal lines and rounded corner entrance are typical of the Streamline Moderne architectural style. The exterior was originally faced with pink stone and black Carrara Glass, though the latter was removed in the early 2000s. Large block letters above the roof line spell the name of the building.
