= Keshawn Banks =

American football player (born 1999)

No. 57 – Minnesota Vikings
- Position: Outside linebacker
- Roster status: Practice squad

Personal information
- Born: December 21, 1999 (age 26); Albuquerque, New Mexico, U.S.
- Listed height: 6 ft 3 in (1.91 m)
- Listed weight: 251 lb (114 kg)

Career information
- High school: Rio Rancho (Rio Rancho, New Mexico)
- College: San Diego State (2018–2022)
- NFL draft: 2023: undrafted

Career history
- Green Bay Packers (2023); New England Patriots (2024); Arizona Cardinals (2024)*; Michigan Panthers (2026)*; Orlando Storm (2026); Atlanta Falcons (2026)*; Minnesota Vikings (2026–present)*
- * Offseason or practice squad member only

Awards and highlights
- Second-team All-MWC (2021)
- Stats at Pro Football Reference

Keshawn Duvall Banks (born December 21, 1999) is an American professional football outside linebacker for the Minnesota Vikings of the National Football League (NFL). He played college football for the San Diego State Aztecs and was signed by the Green Bay Packers as an undrafted free agent in 2023.

== Early life ==
Banks was born on December 21, 1999, in Albuquerque, New Mexico. He attended Rio Rancho High School and played football, basketball and track; he won three varsity letters while playing football and helped the team compile an undefeated 13–0 record and win the state championship in 2016. He received all-district, all-metro and all-state honors while being the metro defensive player of the year and being invited to the North–South all-star game. He totaled 133 tackles, 18 sacks, eight pass deflections, three forced fumbles and three fumble recoveries in his high school career, including 55 tackles, 10 sacks and four pass deflections as a senior. A three-star recruit, he committed to play college football for the San Diego State Aztecs.

== College career ==
Banks played in 12 games as a true freshman at San Diego State University in 2018 and had seven tackles. He became a starter in 2019 and was named second-team All-Mountain West Conference (MWC) after totaling 43 tackles, 13.5 tackles-for-loss and 4.5 sacks. He started seven games in 2020 and had 14 tackles, being named honorable mention All-MWC. Banks was named second-team all-conference for the second time in 2021, recording 35 tackles, 11 tackles-for-loss, 15 quarterback hurries and five sacks. In his final season, 2022, he was named honorable mention all-conference and made 40 tackles, 11.5 tackles-for-loss and 3.5 sacks. He ended his collegiate career having started his final 47 games and placed sixth in school history with 42 tackles-for-loss; he also had 137 tackles.

== Professional career ==
Pre-draft measurables
Height	Weight	Arm length	Hand span	Wingspan	20-yard shuttle	Three-cone drill	Vertical jump	Broad jump	Bench press
6 ft 3 1/4 in (1.91 m)	251 lb (114 kg)	32 3/4 in (0.83 m)	10 1/4 in (0.26 m)	6 ft 6 1/4 in (1.99 m)	4.60 s	7.30 s	29.0 in (0.74 m)	8 ft 11 in (2.72 m)	20 reps
All values from Pro Day

=== Green Bay Packers ===
After going unselected in the 2023 NFL draft, Banks was signed by the Green Bay Packers as an undrafted free agent. He had five tackles and two quarterback pressures in preseason. He was released at the final roster cuts and subsequently re-signed to the practice squad. After having appeared in no regular season games, he was elevated to the active roster for the team's divisional round playoff game and made his debut in their loss to the San Francisco 49ers, appearing on nine special teams snaps and two defensive snaps.

Banks signed a reserve/future contract with the Packers on January 22, 2024. He was released by Green Bay on August 27.

=== New England Patriots ===
On October 23, 2024, Banks signed with the New England Patriots practice squad. He was released by the Patriots on December 10, having appeared in three games for the team.

=== Arizona Cardinals ===
On December 18, 2024, the Arizona Cardinals signed Banks to their practice squad.

=== Michigan Panthers ===
On October 9, 2024, Banks signed with the Michigan Panthers of the United Football League (UFL). His contract was terminated on October 22 to sign with an NFL team. He re-signed on August 29, 2025.

=== Orlando Storm ===
On January 14, 2026, Banks was selected by the Orlando Storm in the 2026 UFL Draft.

=== Atlanta Falcons ===
On June 17, 2026, Banks signed with the Atlanta Falcons on the second day of their mini-camp. On August 30, Banks was waived by the Falcons with an injury designation.

=== Minnesota Vikings ===
On September 30, 2026, Banks signed to the Minnesota Vikings practice squad.
