= AXR =

AXR may refer to:

- Abdominal x-ray
- Action Express Racing
- Amrep Corporation, traded as AXR
- The TPD USA AXR, a clone of the Steyr AUG assault rifle
