= Blake Swihart =

American baseball player (born 1992)

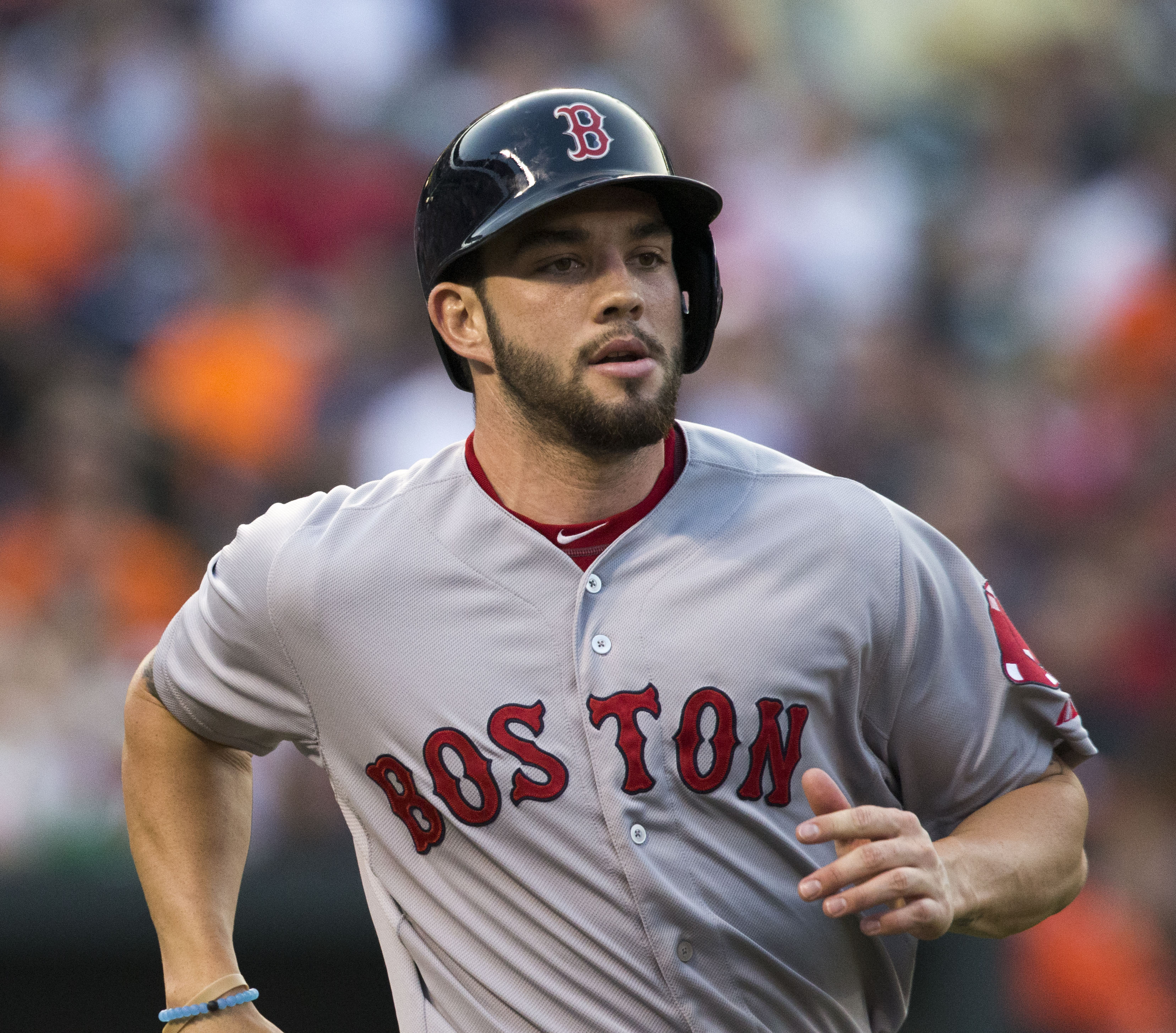
- Swihart with the Boston Red Sox
- Catcher / Utility
- Born: April 3, 1992 (age 34); Bedford, Texas, U.S.
- Batted: Switch Threw: Right

MLB debut
- May 2, 2015, for the Boston Red Sox

Last MLB appearance
- August 11, 2019, for the Arizona Diamondbacks

MLB statistics
- Batting average: .243
- Home runs: 12
- Runs batted in: 67
- Stats at Baseball Reference

Teams
- Boston Red Sox (2015–2019); Arizona Diamondbacks (2019)

Career highlights and awards
- World Series champion (2018)

Blake Aubry Swihart (born April 3, 1992) is an American former professional baseball catcher and outfielder. He has previously played in Major League Baseball (MLB) for the Boston Red Sox and Arizona Diamondbacks. Listed at 6 feet 1 inch (1.85 m) and 205 pounds (93 kg), he throws right-handed and is a switch hitter.

== Amateur career ==
Blake attended V. Sue Cleveland High School in Rio Rancho, New Mexico, where he competed in basketball, baseball, and football. Playing mainly as a shortstop, he had a .602 batting average (56-for-93) with 17 doubles, five triples, five home runs, 41 runs batted in (RBIs) and 58 runs scored in 28 games as a senior. As a pitcher, Swihart's fastball could reach 85 miles per hour (137 km/h) before he began high school, and was up to 98 miles per hour (158 km/h) by the time he was a junior. However, it was during his junior season that Swihart quit pitching because he preferred to hit, and it was also during his junior season when Swihart first began playing catcher.

In 2009, Blake attended Rio Rancho High School, where he helped the Rio Rancho Rams win a State Championship, leading the team in multiple offensive categories. Blake played under longtime head coach Ron Murphy. Blake played for the Rams for two seasons before Sue Cleveland was built, which prompted him to change schools as he lived in the new boundaries.

Blake played for USA Baseball's 18-Under National Team in 2010 and led his team with a .448 average, earning Louisville Slugger All-American honors. For Team USA, Swihart played first base and left field. He played in the 2010 Aflac All-American High School Baseball Classic. Off of the baseball field, Swihart had a 4.0 GPA. He committed to attend the University of Texas at Austin on a college baseball scholarship. His best friend is Alex Bregman, with whom he grew up playing travel ball.

== Professional career ==
=== Boston Red Sox ===
The Red Sox selected Swihart in the first round, with the 26th overall selection of the 2011 MLB draft. He became the highest-drafted player out of New Mexico since Shane Andrews in 1990. Though he played as a shortstop in high school, the Red Sox converted Swihart into a catcher because of his athleticism and strong throwing arm. The Red Sox signed Swihart, giving him a $2.5 million signing bonus to convince him to bypass his commitment to the University of Texas.

==== Minor leagues ====
Swihart played briefly in the rookie-level Gulf Coast League in 2011 with the GCL Red Sox, then received consecutive promotions to the Greenville Drive of the Single–A South Atlantic League in 2012, and the Salem Red Sox of the High–A Carolina League in 2013.

Prior to the 2014 season, Swihart was named the 73rd-best prospect by Baseball America. He began the 2014 season with the Portland Sea Dogs of the Double–A Eastern League. In August, the Red Sox promoted Swihart, with pitching prospect Henry Owens, to the Pawtucket Red Sox of the Triple–A International League. Swihart was ranked as the second highest-ranked prospect in the Red Sox organization for the 2014 season, according to MLB.com.

Swihart was added to Boston's 40-man roster in November 2014. With fellow prospect Christian Vázquez considered more developmentally advanced, the Red Sox assigned Swihart to Pawtucket to gain more experience at the Triple–A level. However, Vázquez later underwent surgery and was ruled out for the entire 2015 season.

==== 2015–2017 ====
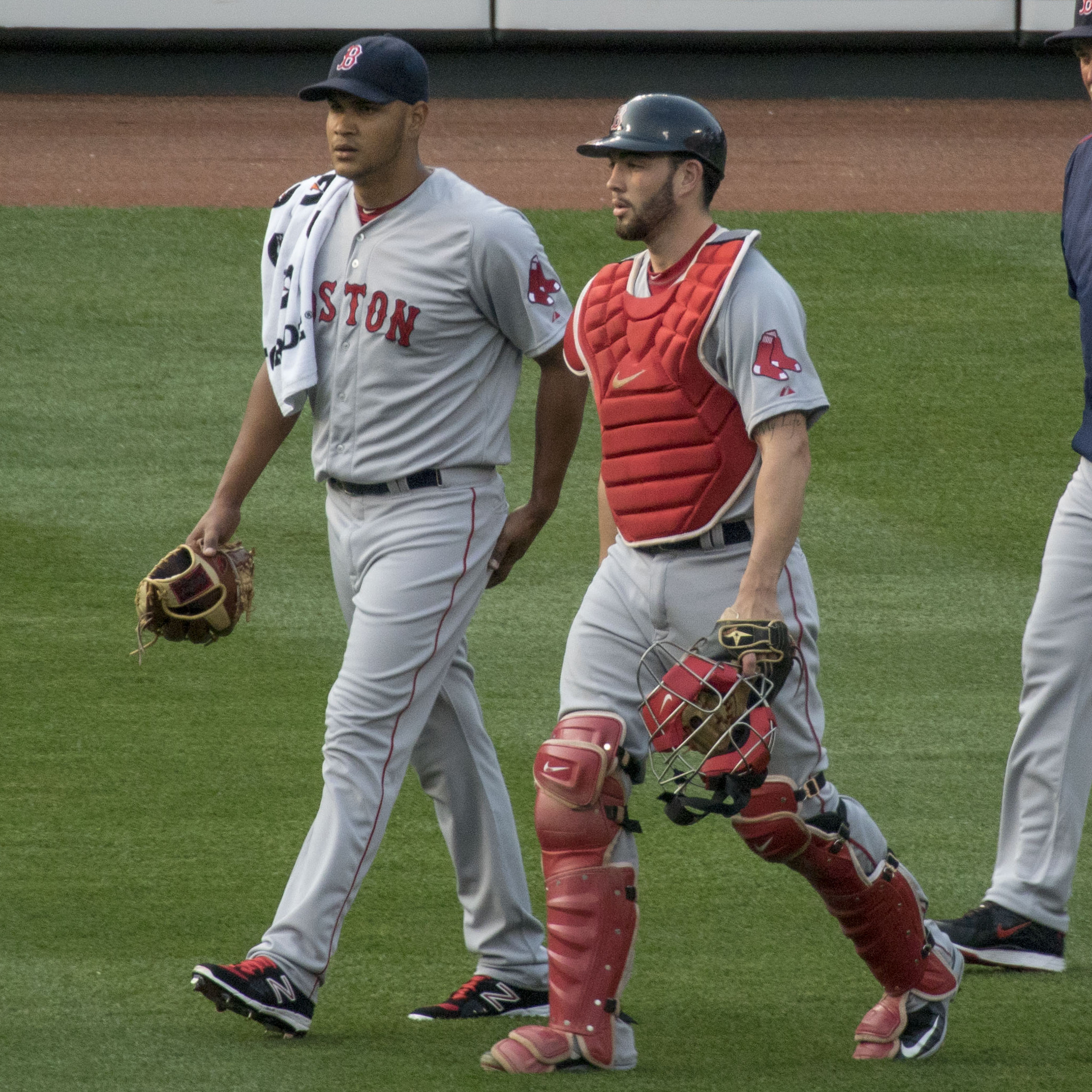
Swihart (right) with pitcher Eduardo Rodríguez in June 2015

On May 2, 2015, Swihart was called up to the big leagues for the first time, after catcher Ryan Hanigan was placed on the disabled list with a broken finger. On that day, Swihart recorded his first major league hit, against the New York Yankees. On June 4, Swihart hit his first major league home run in the third inning of an 8–4 loss to the Minnesota Twins. A switch-hitter, Swihart hit the home run from the right side of the plate off Twins' starter Tommy Milone. At 23 years old, Swihart became the youngest Red Sox catcher to hit a home run since Rich Gedman in 1982. When Swihart faced Pat Venditte on June 5, Venditte saw he was batting using a righty batting helmet. Venditte then requested to switch his throwing arm (Venditte could pitch with either arm), and Swihart also changed his helmet. Swihart would strike out later, for Venditte's first strikeout. On August 28, Swihart hit an inside-the-park home run in the 10th inning of a 6–4 win over the New York Mets. On September 29, against Yankees, Swihart had his first career multi-home run game and a career high of five RBIs. Overall, with the 2015 Red Sox, Swihart appeared in 84 games, batting .274 with five home runs and 31 RBIs. Defensively, all of his appearances were as catcher.

Swihart started playing left field for the 2016 season, and split time between Pawtucket (29 games) and Boston (19 games). With the 2016 Red Sox, he hit .258 with no home runs and five RBIs, while making six appearances at catcher and 13 in left field. During 2017, Swihart again split time between Boston (six games) and Pawtucket (53 games), while also playing nine games with the GCL Red Sox. With the 2017 Red Sox, he batted 1-for-5 (.200), while defensively appearing in four games at catcher.

==== 2018–2019 ====
Swihart was converted into a utility player for 2018; he played first base, third base, catcher, and left field during spring training. In mid-May, his agent asked the Red Sox to trade Swihart, given his limited playing time with the team. At the time, Swihart was hitting .138 (4-for-29) in 32 plate appearances, having played games at catcher, first base, left field, and designated hitter. Swihart was placed on the disabled list on August 3, with a right hamstring strain. To that point in the season, he had appeared in 51 games, batting .226 with one home run and six RBIs. He returned to the active roster on August 14. Swihart played throughout the season as a bench player, appearing in 82 games and batting .229/.285/.328 with three home runs. In the postseason, Swihart played two innings in the outfield and caught one inning, going 0-for-3 at the plate, as the Red Sox won the World Series in five games over the Los Angeles Dodgers.

Swihart started the 2019 season as one of two catchers for Boston, along with Christian Vázquez, as Sandy León was outrighted to the minor leagues. Swihart was designated for assignment on April 16, to make space for León on the roster. Swihart had appeared in six games with the 2019 Red Sox, batting 6-for-26 (.231) with one home run and four RBIs.

=== Arizona Diamondbacks ===
On April 19, 2019, the Arizona Diamondbacks acquired Swihart, along with international signing bonus pool money, from Boston in exchange for outfielder Marcus Wilson. Swihart was designated for assignment on August 12, 2019. He elected free agency on October 1, 2019.

=== Texas Rangers ===
On December 16, 2019, Swihart signed a minor league contract with the Texas Rangers. On August 25, 2020, Swihart was released by the Rangers organization.

=== Washington Nationals ===
On January 27, 2021, Swihart signed a minor league contract with the Washington Nationals organization that included an invitation to Spring Training. In 70 games for the Triple-A Rochester Red Wings, Swihart slashed .198/.299/.339 with 5 home runs and 17 RBI. On September 13, 2021, he was released.

=== Lexington Legends ===
On April 20, 2022, Swihart signed with the Lexington Legends of the Atlantic League of Professional Baseball. In 53 games, he batted .157/.297/.281 with 4 home runs and 15 RBI. Swihart was released by the Legends on September 1.

=== Charleston Dirty Birds ===
On April 24, 2024, Swihart signed with the Charleston Dirty Birds of the Atlantic League of Professional Baseball. In four games for Charleston, he went 0-for-7 with six walks. On May 3, Swihart was released by the Dirty Birds.

On May 8, 2024, Swihart signed with the Dorados de Chihuahua of the Mexican League. However, he did not appear in a game for the club, and was released on May 31.

== Personal life ==
His father, Arlan, is a nuclear engineer and played basketball for Southern Illinois University. Swihart and his wife, Shelby, were married in 2017.

Swihart's older brother, Jace, serves in the United States Army. He has a younger sister, Kacie. Swihart's parents, Carla and Arlan, adopted Romell Jordan, a family friend who came to live with them during high school. Jordan played running back for the University of New Mexico. Jordan died at age 23 in 2019.
