= Grant Hermanns =

American football player (born 1998)

No. 63
- Position: Offensive tackle

Personal information
- Born: March 5, 1998 (age 28)
- Listed height: 6 ft 8 in (2.03 m)
- Listed weight: 305 lb (138 kg)

Career information
- High school: Rio Rancho (Rio Rancho, New Mexico)
- College: Purdue (2016–2020)
- NFL draft: 2021: undrafted

Career history
- New York Jets (2021–2022); Miami Dolphins (2022)*; Tampa Bay Buccaneers (2022)*; New York Jets (2023)*
- * Offseason or practice squad member only

Career NFL statistics
- Games played: 2
- Stats at Pro Football Reference

Grant Monroe Hermanns (born March 5, 1998) is an American former professional football player who was an offensive tackle for the New York Jets of the National Football League (NFL). He played college football for the Purdue Boilermakers from 2016 to 2020, appearing in a total of 33 games and being named honorable mention All-Big Ten Conference as a senior. He was signed by the Jets as an undrafted free agent in 2021 and later played two games for them in 2022. He had stints with the Miami Dolphins in 2022 and with the Tampa Bay Buccaneers from 2022 to 2023, but saw no playing time with either team. He later returned to the Jets in 2023 but was released shortly afterwards before retiring in 2024.

== Early life ==
Grant Monroe Hermanns was born on March 5, 1998, and grew up in Albuquerque, New Mexico. He attended Rio Rancho High School in Rio Rancho, and was a four-year letter winner. In 2013, he won first place at the high school research exposition in chemistry/biochemistry. As a junior and senior, in football, he earned All-Metro honors from the Albuquerque Football Coaches Association and All-State from the New Mexico Coaches Association. His team won the 2014 New Mexico 6A state championship after compiling an undefeated 13–0 record.

=== Staph infection ===
In hopes of improving his chances of being recruited to a Division I school, Hermanns participated in several combines entering his senior year. During the 40-yard dash, he suffered a hip avulsion fracture, but nonetheless continued and finished the combine. The fracture resulted in him missing several football games. He eventually recovered and played in six games of the season, and performed well enough that he was given All-Metro and All-State honors.

"But then I started getting these weird fevers," he later said.

I would be at 104 degrees just randomly or I'd go all the way down to 94, a sub-fever. And it would happen all the time, like every other day. I'd be falling asleep in class, just covered in sweat. My parents didn't know what was going on and they took me to the doctor multiple times. The doctor said, 'You're fine, nothing's wrong.' They tested my white cell count and they couldn't find anything.

Despite being told he was fine, Hermanns' weight started to decrease at a rapid rate, going from 265 pounds (120 kg) down to 190 pounds (86 kg) in only a couple months. His mother brought him to a physical therapist, and when asked to sit on the table, his left hip was elevated much higher than his right. "They were like, 'Oh, that's not right,'" he recalled.

At the next day's football practice, Hermanns believed in the bathroom he was urinating blood. Later, it was discovered that it was his liver enzymes exiting his body, meaning that it was deteriorating due to an illness. He was immediately brought to the emergency room, where an MRI discovered a pomegranate-sized cyst located in his hip. His cyst was removed the next day through surgery.

Doctors told Hermanns and his family that the staph infection may have resulted from a cut received during a football game. He was told that it had entered his hip and started attacking his body in the subsequent months. They also said that if he had been several years older, the infection may have been fatal, as it is better handled by younger patients.

Hermanns lost feeling in a section of his left leg, as well as his left foot, after the surgery; one spot is still numb due to nerve damage resulting from the infection. He had to re-learn walking, but within time became closer to normal. As the football season had stopped by this time, Hermanns focused his efforts on wrestling. Just a couple months after the near-fatal staph infection, Hermanns entered the New Mexico Class 6A State Wrestling Championships and won the heavyweight division.

== College career ==
After graduating from Rio Rancho, Hermanns committed to Purdue University over offers from at least eleven other schools, including New Mexico. At Purdue, he majored in industrial management. He redshirted his first year, 2016. He added 40 pounds in 2017, and, despite being a redshirt-freshman, made the Boilermakers' starting lineup. That year, he started the first six games before suffering a season-ending knee injury. He helped block for a total of 403.1 yards offense a game and was named a 2017 Academic All-Big Ten Conference selection.

As a sophomore in 2018, Hermanns started nine games and was named an Academic All-Big Ten selection. He helped block for the Purdue offense which averaged over 440 yards of offense each game. He was named team captain for his junior year, 2019, and started all 12 games, earning Academic All-Big Ten honors while helping the team compile an average of 393.2 yards of offense per game. As a senior, Hermanns started all six games of Purdue's COVID shortened season, was named team captain, received his fourth Academic All-Big Ten Conference selection and was named honorable mention All-Big Ten.

All college players were given an extra year of eligibility due to the COVID-19 pandemic. Despite being eligible for one additional season due to this, Hermanns decided to declare for the NFL draft. He finished his four-year career at Purdue with a total of 33 games played, all at the left tackle position.

== Professional career ==
Pre-draft measurables
Height	Weight	Arm length	Hand span	40-yard dash	10-yard split	20-yard split	20-yard shuttle	Three-cone drill	Vertical jump	Broad jump	Bench press
6 ft 7 1/2 in (2.02 m)	300 lb (136 kg)	33 1/2 in (0.85 m)	9 7/8 in (0.25 m)	5.29 s	1.86 s	2.97 s	4.58 s	7.76 s	27 in (0.69 m)	8 ft 11 in (2.72 m)	26 reps
All values from Purdue pro day

=== New York Jets (first stint) ===
Hermanns signed with the New York Jets as an undrafted free agent following the 2021 NFL draft. He was waived during final roster cuts on August 31, but re-signed to the practice squad the next day. He was signed to a future contract on January 10, 2022, after spending the whole 2021 season on the practice squad.

In the 2022 preseason, Hermanns played in all three games and appeared on 78 offensive snaps, as well as ten special teams snaps. He was waived on August 30, 2022, at the final roster cuts, but was subsequently re-signed to the practice squad. He was activated from the practice squad on September 10, for their game against the Baltimore Ravens, and reverted back afterwards. He was again activated on September 17, for New York's game against the Cleveland Browns, and made his NFL debut in the contest, a 31–30 win, appearing on five special teams snaps. He was activated for a third time on October 1, against the Pittsburgh Steelers, taking two special teams snaps. He was released on October 11, 2022.

=== Miami Dolphins ===
On October 26, 2022, Hermanns was signed to the Miami Dolphins practice squad. He was released on November 28, 2022.

=== Tampa Bay Buccaneers ===
On December 7, 2022, Hermanns was signed to the Tampa Bay Buccaneers practice squad. He signed a reserve/future contract on January 17, 2023. He was released on August 7, 2023.

=== New York Jets (second stint) ===
On August 8, 2023, the Jets claimed Hermanns off waivers for a second stint with the team. He was waived on August 29, 2023. On February 16, 2024, Hermanns announced his retirement.

== Personal life ==
Hermanns's mother, Kelli, played volleyball at Chabot College.
