= Tre Watson =

American football player (born 2002)

No. 87 – Miami Dolphins
- Position: Tight end
- Roster status: Practice squad

Personal information
- Born: October 12, 2002 (age 24); Rio Rancho, New Mexico, U.S.
- Listed height: 6 ft 5 in (1.96 m)
- Listed weight: 250 lb (113 kg)

Career information
- High school: Cleveland (2017–2021) (Rio Rancho, New Mexico)
- College: Fresno State (2021–2023); Texas A&M (2024)
- NFL draft: 2025: undrafted

Career history
- Kansas City Chiefs (2025)*; Miami Dolphins (2026–present)*
- * Offseason or practice squad member only
- Stats at Pro Football Reference

Tre Watson III (born October 12, 2002) is an American professional football tight end for the Miami Dolphins of the National Football League (NFL). He played college football for the Fresno State Bulldogs and the Texas A&M Aggies.

== Early life ==
Watson was born in 2002 in Rio Rancho, New Mexico. Standing 6 ft 5 in (1.96 m) and weighing between 200–210 lbs (91–95 kg), Watson was a two-sport athlete while attending Cleveland High School. He played guard with the Cleveland Storm basketball team and wide receiver with the football team. His performances in both sports earned Watson all-state selections, a three-star collegiate recruitment rating by 247Sports.com as well as 12 collegiate offers.

== College career ==
=== Fresno State ===
Watson enrolled at California State University, Fresno (Fresno State) joining the Bulldogs as a tight end for the 2022 season. He went on to play a total of 33 career games at Fresno State in which he made 19 starts. Watson's performance in the 2023 season during which he caught 38 passes for 378 yards and four touchdowns earned him a second place record among tight ends. In his junior season in 2023, Watson earned an All-Mountain West honorable mention prior to entering the transfer portal.

=== Texas A&M ===
Watson transferred to Texas A&M University for the 2024 season as a tight end with the Aggies. In his senior season, Watson started 12 of 13 games, recording one reception in 11 games and caught no less than three passes in four consecutive games.

== Professional career ==
Pre-draft measurables
| Height | Weight | Arm length | Hand span | Wingspan | 40-yard dash | 10-yard split | 20-yard split | 20-yard shuttle | Three-cone drill | Vertical jump | Broad jump | Bench press |
|---|---|---|---|---|---|---|---|---|---|---|---|---|
| 6 ft 4 1/4 in (1.94 m) | 247 lb (112 kg) | 33 in (0.84 m) | 9 in (0.23 m) | 6 ft 6 1/8 in (1.98 m) | 4.68 s | 1.64 s | 2.72 s | 4.50 s | 7.14 s | 35.0 in (0.89 m) | 10 ft 4 in (3.15 m) | 19 reps |
All values from Pro Day

=== Kansas City Chiefs ===
On April 26, 2025, Watson signed with the Kansas City Chiefs as an undrafted free agent following the 2025 NFL draft. He was assigned to the practice squad following the first phase of roster cuts made on August 27. Watson signed a reserve/future contract with the Chiefs on January 12, 2026.

On August 30, 2026, Watson was waived by the Chiefs as a part of final roster cuts.

=== Miami Dolphins ===
On September 1, 2026, Watson signed with the Miami Dolphins practice squad.
