= Chris Williams (wide receiver) =

American football player (born 1987)

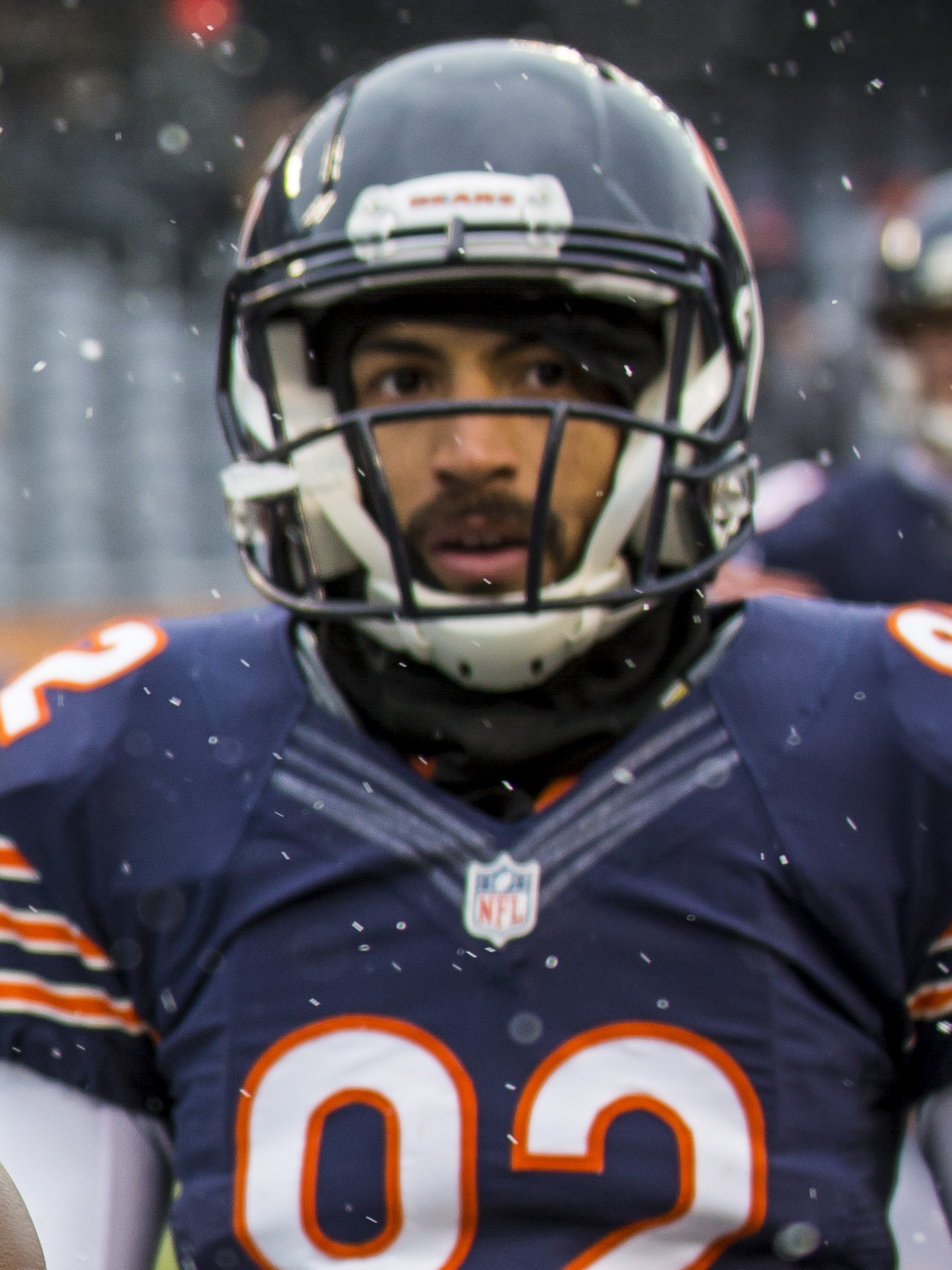
- Williams with the Chicago Bears in 2014

No. 82, 2
- Position: Wide receiver

Personal information
- Born: September 16, 1987 (age 39); Fort Worth, Texas, U.S.
- Listed height: 5 ft 8 in (1.73 m)
- Listed weight: 165 lb (75 kg)

Career information
- High school: Rio Rancho (Rio Rancho, New Mexico)
- College: New Mexico State

Career history
- 2009: Miami Dolphins*
- 2009: Cleveland Browns*
- 2010–2012: Hamilton Tiger-Cats
- 2013: New Orleans Saints*
- 2013–2014: Chicago Bears
- 2015–2016: Ottawa Redblacks
- 2017: BC Lions
- 2018: Montreal Alouettes
- 2018: Hamilton Tiger-Cats
- * Offseason or practice squad member only

Awards and highlights
- Grey Cup champion (2016); CFL All-Star (2012); 4× CFL East All-Star (2011, 2012, 2015, 2016); Frank M. Gibson Trophy (2011); CFL's Most Outstanding Rookie Award (2011); John Agro Special Teams Award (2012); 2× First-team All-WAC (2006, 2008); Second-team All-WAC (2007)
- Stats at Pro Football Reference
- Stats at CFL.ca

Chris Williams (born September 16, 1987) is an American former professional football player who was a wide receiver in the National Football League (NFL) and Canadian Football League (CFL). He played college football for the New Mexico State Aggies. Williams was signed by the Miami Dolphins as an undrafted free agent in 2009. He made his professional debut for the Hamilton Tiger-Cats (CFL) in 2011. Williams was also a member of the Cleveland Browns, New Orleans Saints, Chicago Bears, Ottawa Redblacks, BC Lions and Montreal Alouettes.

== Early life ==
He was born in Fort Worth, Texas and attended Rio Rancho High School in Rio Rancho, New Mexico, where he was a letterman in football, basketball and track. In football, he was named to the first-team All-state team after rushing for nearly 2,100 yards and 33 touchdowns as a senior in 2004. He was also named to the first-team All-state basketball team.

Also an outstanding track & field athlete, Williams scored 26 points at the 2005 Class 5A State Championships, where he captured the state titles in the 200-meter dash (21.51 s), 400-meter dash, the high jump (6 ft, 11in) was a member of the state champion 4 × 100 m relay and the state champion 4 × 400 m relay squads. He won the state high jump and 200-meter dash title in 2004, and State High Jump in 2003. He won a total of 9 state titles in track in his high school career.

== College career ==
Williams played college football for the New Mexico State Aggies. Williams was the Aggies’ top receiver in 2006, playing in all 12 games. He became the ninth player in school history to earn All-American honors as he was named to the SI.com All-America Honorable Mention team. Williams led the nation in receiving yards per game (117.9) and catches per game (7.66). His 1,861 all-purpose yards also ranked fourth in the nation. In 2007, Williams started the Aggies first eight games before suffering a season ending injury to his shoulder. In just eight games, Williams caught 56 passes for 772 yards and 11 touchdowns. He also returned five kicks for 116 yards and six punts for 100 yards. Despite missing five games, Williams was named a finalist for the Biletnikoff Award, he also earned second all-WAC honors as voted on by the WAC coaches.

== Professional career ==
Pre-draft measurables
Height	Weight	40-yard dash	10-yard split	20-yard split	20-yard shuttle	Three-cone drill	Vertical jump	Broad jump	Bench press
5 ft 7 1/8 in (1.70 m)	170 lb (77 kg)	4.28 s	1.44 s	2.43 s	4.15 s	6.84 s	39 in (0.99 m)	10 ft 7 in (3.23 m)	13 reps
All values from Pro Day

=== Miami Dolphins ===
He signed with the Miami Dolphins as an undrafted college free agent on April 30, 2009. He was waived/injured on August 24 and subsequently reverted to injured reserve. He was released with an injury settlement on August 25.

=== Cleveland Browns ===
Williams was signed to the Cleveland Browns practice squad on November 9. He was released on November 18.

=== Hamilton Tiger-Cats (first stint) ===
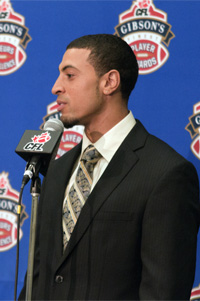
Williams after being presented with the CFL's Outstanding Special Teams Player Award in 2012

Williams originally signed with the Hamilton Tiger-Cats on October 18, 2010 and spent two weeks on the team's practice roster. He was re-signed on May 18, 2011. On September 3, 2012, during the last Labour Day Classic played at Ivor Wynne Stadium, Willams recorded his sixth return touchdown of the year, setting a new CFL record for return touchdowns in a single season. It was also the third consecutive game in which Williams had returned a punt for a touchdown, which also established a new CFL record. Williams finished the season with 16 touchdowns, 1,298 receiving yards and 1,117 punt return yards.

After an outstanding season Willams did not want to return to the Tiger-Cats under his current contract of less than $50,000, and on March 15 he tweeted the following, ""Im beefin with my squad im not going back." On April 4 it was announced that Williams had contacted the Canadian Football League Players' Association to see if the Tiger-Cats violated a provision within the collective bargaining agreement that could lead to the final year of his contract with the Tiger-Cats being voided. Williams claims that the Ticats did not offer him the one year plus an option, but rather just the two-year plus an option contract. After failing to show up for mandatory training camp at the start of June 2013 the Tiger-Cats placed him under suspension. Neither Williams nor his agent has made any contact with the Tiger-Cats, despite the team trying to communicate with them. On June 4, 2013 an independent arbitrator ruled that Williams' contract with the Tiger-Cats was legal and binding. However, almost 3 months later on August 29, 2013, the Ontario Superior Court of Justice over-ruled the decision of the independent arbitrator, declaring Williams is not bound to any contractual obligations with the Tiger-Cats, making him a free agent in the view of the CFL Players Association. The CFL has announced that they would appeal the decision. On October 2, 2013 the Hamilton Tiger-Cats announced that Williams was free to sign with any NFL team, but they would reserve his CFL rights through the 2014 CFL season.

=== New Orleans Saints ===
On October 3, 2013, he was signed by the New Orleans Saints. The move came just one day after he was granted free agency.

=== Chicago Bears ===
On December 26, 2013, Williams was signed by the Chicago Bears. On November 9, 2014, Williams took a kickoff back 101 yards for a touchdown and tied an NFL record with 10 kickoff return attempts. He was waived/injured on December 3, 2014 to make way for the signing of Jay Feely as injury cover for Robbie Gould when he was considered doubtful for the game against the Dallas Cowboys on December 4.

=== Ottawa Redblacks ===
On April 21, 2015, the Ottawa Redblacks of the Canadian Football League announced that they had signed Williams to a one-year contract. Williams finished the season with the third most receiving yards in the league with 1,214 yards on 88 receptions with 5 touchdowns. In January 2016 Williams and the Redblacks agreed to a contract extension. Through the first 3 games of the 2016 season Williams broke the CFL record for most receiving yards to in the first three games of a season; a record set by Allen Pitts in 1994 who went on to finish the '94 season with more than 2,000 receiving yards. Williams was named the CFL Top Performer of the Month for the month of July after amassing 38 receptions for 625 yards with 6 touchdowns in the first 6 weeks of the season (there was no Top Performer for the two playable weeks in the month of June). Partway through their Week 16 match-up against the Roughriders Williams was forced to leave the game early with a knee injury. A few days later it was announced that he had sustained a torn ACL and would miss the remainder of the 2016 season. In 14 games played Williams finished the season with 1,246 receiving yards on 77 receptions with 10 of them going for touchdowns.

=== BC Lions ===
Upon entering free agency, Williams signed a two-year contract with the BC Lions on February 17, 2017. Williams had a down season in 2017, catching only 38 passes for 415 yards and only one touchdown.

=== Montreal Alouettes ===
Following a disappointing 2017 season in BC, Williams was traded to the Montreal Alouettes in exchange for Gabriel Knapton on December 12, 2017. Williams started out the 2018 season playing well for the Alouettes, catching 15 passes for 283 yards with one touchdown in four games.

=== Hamilton Tiger-Cats (second stint) ===
Following the sixth week of the 2018 season Williams was traded to the Tiger-Cats along with defensive lineman Jamaal Westerman and two first round picks for quarterback Johnny Manziel and offensive linemen Tony Washington and Landon Rice. Williams played in four games for the Tiger-Cats in 2018, catching 10 passes for 114 yards. He suffered a non-contact knee injury in Week 11 and underwent surgery shortly thereafter.

== Career statistics ==
=== NFL ===
Year	Team	G	Receiving							Rushing					Fumbles	
Year	Team	G	Rec	Yds	Avg	Lng	YAC	1stD	TD	Att	Yds	Avg	Lng	TD	Fum	Lost
2013	CHI	7	0	0	0.0	0	0	0	0	1	-8.0	0.0	0	0	0	0
2014	CHI	Did not play														

=== CFL ===
		Receiving						Rushing
Year	Team	GP	Rec	Yards	Avg	Long	TD	Car	Yards	Avg	Long	TD
2011	HAM	15	70	1,064	15.2	71	6	6	43	7.2	14	0
2012	HAM	18	83	1,298	15.6	93	11	5	10	2.0	11	0
2015	OTT	16	88	1,214	13.8	84	5	1	8	8.0	8	0
2016	OTT	14	77	1,246	16.2	71	10	0	0	0.0	0	0
2017	BC	9	38	415	10.9	56	1	2	5	2.5	3	0
2018	MTL	4	15	283	18.9	79	1	1	-2	-2.0	-2	0
2018	HAM	4	10	114	11.4	22	0	0	0	0.0	0	0
CFL totals		80	381	5,634	14.8	93	34	15	64	4.3	14	0

== See also ==
- List of NCAA major college football yearly receiving leaders
