= Rio Rancho Public Schools =

School district in New Mexico

Location
- 500 Laser Road NE, Rio Rancho New Mexico, 87124; United States

District information
- Type: Public
- Motto: "Igniting Student Potential"
- Grades: Pre-K-12
- Established: 1994
- Superintendent: Dr. Robert W. Dodd
- Asst. superintendent(s): Jacey Oliver
- Schools: 22
- Budget: $249,404,494.07 (Mar 2024)
- NCES District ID: 3500010

Students and staff
- Students: 16,519
- Teachers: 923.21
- Staff: 2,377 (Mar 2024)
- Student–teacher ratio: 17.89:1

Other information
- Graduation rate: 86.7% (Mar 2024)
- Website: www.rrps.net

Rio Rancho Public Schools is a school district based in Rio Rancho, New Mexico, United States. Rio Rancho Public Schools serves the municipality of Rio Rancho. The school district has a total of 22 schools. The district has three high schools, two alternative high schools, four middle schools, 11 elementary schools, and two preschools.

The district, with the vast majority of its land in Sandoval County, serves most of Rio Rancho and almost all of Rio Rancho Estates. A very small portion of the district extends into Bernalillo County.

== History ==
Prior to 1997 students in the school district attended Albuquerque Public Schools for high school. The first high school, Rio Rancho High School, opened in 1997.

== Schools ==
=== High schools ===
- Rio Rancho High School
- RioTECH
- V. Sue Cleveland High School (opened August 2009)
- Independence High School

=== Middle schools ===
- Eagle Ridge Middle School
- Lincoln Middle School
- Mountain View Middle School
- Rio Rancho Middle School

=== Elementary schools ===
- Cielo Azul Elementary School
- Colinas del Norte Elementary
- Enchanted Hills Elementary
- E. Stapleton Elementary
- Joe Harris Elementary
- Maggie M. Cordova Elementary
- Martin Luther King, Jr. Elementary
- Puesta del Sol Elementary
- Rio Rancho Elementary
- Sandia Vista Elementary
- Vista Grande Elementary

=== Pre-schools ===
- Shining Stars Preschool
- Puesta del Sol Preschool

=== 6-12 schools ===
- Rio Rancho Cyber Academy

== 2019 attempted shooting ==
On February 14, 2019, V. Sue Cleveland High School was the site of a shooting; however, no one was injured. It was later reported that a 16-year-old boy had fired a gun on school grounds after threatening to kill his ex-girlfriend and others.
