= Joshua Hernandez =

American politician

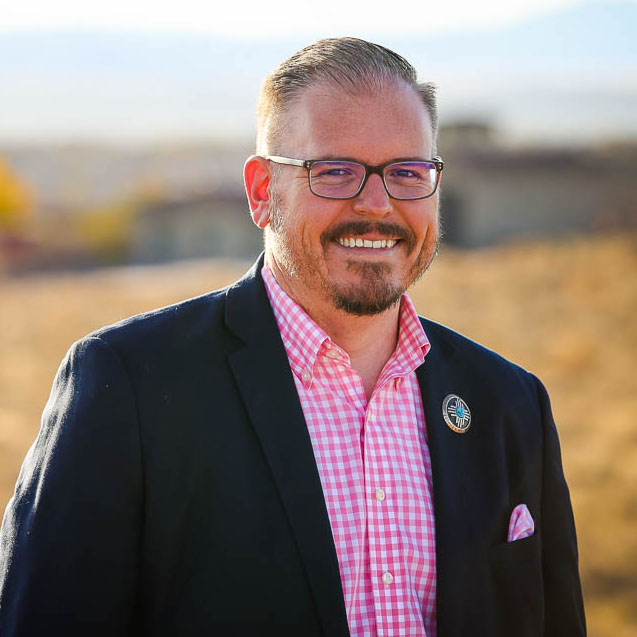

Member of the New Mexico House of Representatives from the 60th district
- Incumbent
- Assumed office January 19, 2021
- Preceded by: Tim Lewis

Personal details
- Born: Albuquerque, New Mexico, U.S.
- Party: Republican

Joshua Hernandez is an American politician and businessman serving as a member of the New Mexico House of Representatives from the 60th district. Elected in 2020, he assumed office on January 19, 2021.

== Early life and education ==
Hernandez was born in Albuquerque, New Mexico and graduated from Cibola High School. He originally studied marketing at the University of New Mexico, but ultimately did not graduate. In the summer of 2023, he graduated with an associate degree in digital marketing from Central New Mexico Community College.

== Career ==
Since 2011 Hernandez has served as communications director and campaign manager for multiple congressional, state and local political campaigns. He was the campaign manager for all of Gregg Hull's successful campaigns for Rio Rancho mayor. Hernandez has since worked as the Digital Media Director for Agenda LLC, an advocacy firm based in Albuquerque. Hernandez also ran unsuccessfully for Rio Rancho City Council in 2016.

In 2020, Hernandez ran unopposed for the 60th district in the New Mexico House of Representatives. He assumed office on January 19, 2021, succeeding incumbent Republican Tim Lewis. He won re-election in 2022.

== Personal life ==
Hernandez lives in Rio Rancho, New Mexico.
