= Rio Rancho High School =

Coordinates: 35°15′52″N 106°40′04″W

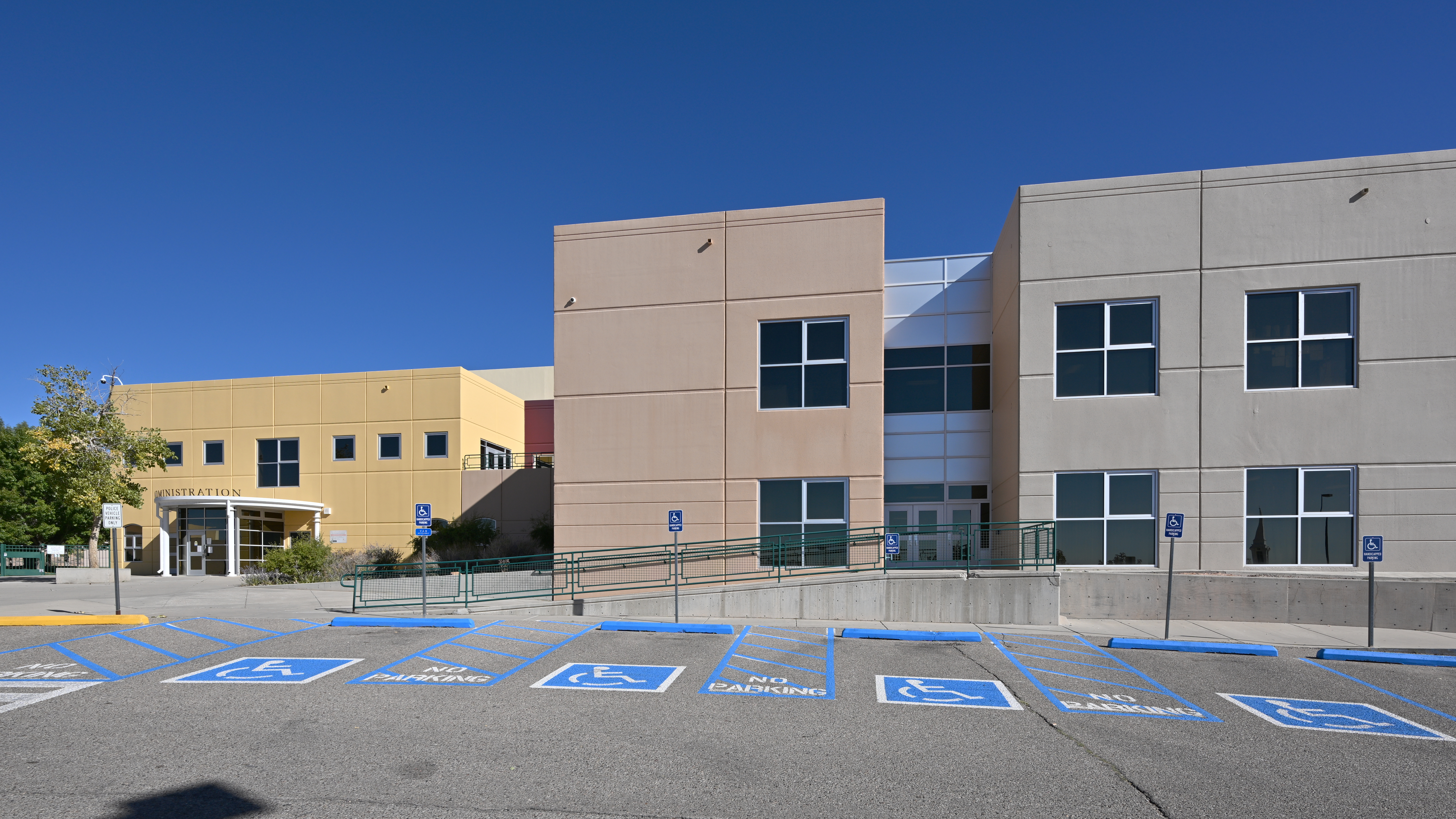

Location
- 301 Loma Colorado Rd. NE; Rio Rancho, New Mexico 87124; United States

Information
- Type: Public high school
- Established: 1997
- Principal: Millian Baca
- Staff: 108.43 (FTE)
- Enrollment: 2,554 (2023-2024)
- Student to teacher ratio: 23.55
- Campus: Suburban
- Colors: Navy blue, hunter green, and white
- Athletics conference: NMAA, 6A Dist. 1
- Mascot: Ram
- Rival: Cleveland High School
- Website: rioranchohigh.rrps.net

Rio Rancho High School is a public high school located in Rio Rancho, New Mexico, United States. It is a part of the Rio Rancho Public Schools.

== History ==
Initially, the state rejected the proposal of Rio Rancho High School. However, Intel Corporation offered to build the high school instead and lease it back at $1 per year for thirty years. When the lease ended, Intel donated the school to a non-profit organization responsible for running the school.

The school opened in 1997. Previously students in the school district at the high school level attended Albuquerque Public Schools. In April 1997, Rio Rancho High officials said that they had not yet finished development of programs for students with special needs.

In 2008, due to overcrowding, Rio Rancho Public Schools constructed V. Sue Cleveland High School, which opened in August 2009. As a result, incoming 9th through 11th grade students who resided south of Northern Blvd began attend Rio Rancho High School and all residing north of Northern Blvd began to attend V. Sue Cleveland High School. The class of 2010 continued to attend Rio Rancho High School regardless of where they resided in Rio Rancho.

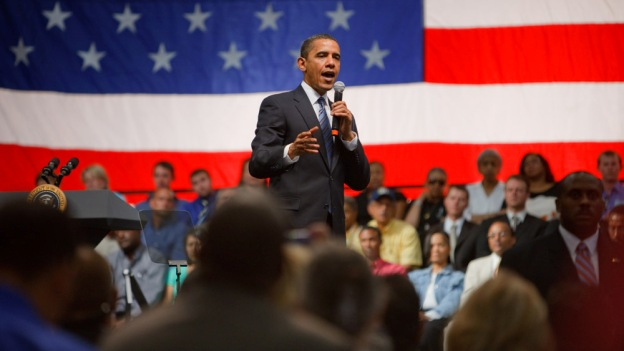
President Obama gives a speech in the "RAC" athletic facility.

President Barack Obama hosted a town hall meeting at the school on May 14, 2009 regarding credit card reform.

== In popular culture ==
Rio Rancho High School was used as filming location for the TV series Breaking Bad and Better Call Saul, being portrayed in the shows as J. P. Wynne High School.

The campus was also used as a film location in the 2011 movie Fright Night.

== Notable alumni ==
- Keshawn Banks - NFL football player
- Grant Hermanns - professional football offensive tackle
- Zahra Marwan - artist
- Imani Morlock - soccer player
- Chris Newsome - basketball player
- Blake Swihart - professional baseball catcher
- Chris Williams - professional football player
