= Rio Rancho Estates, New Mexico =

Rio Rancho Estates
- Census-designated place
- Location within New Mexico Location within the United States
- Coordinates: 35°17′58″N 106°46′35″W
- Country: United States
- State: New Mexico
- County: Sandoval

Area
  - Total: 68.35 sq mi (177.03 km^{2})
  - Land: 68.35 sq mi (177.03 km^{2})
  - Water: 0 sq mi (0.00 km^{2})
- Elevation: 6,942 ft (2,116 m)

Population (2020)
  - Total: 1,801
  - Density: 26.3/sq mi (10.17/km^{2})
- Time zone: UTC-7 (Mountain (MST))
  - Summer (DST): UTC-6 (MDT)
- ZIP Codes: 87124, 87144 (Rio Rancho)
- Area code: 505
- FIPS code: 35-63530
- GNIS feature ID: 2812756

Rio Rancho Estates is an unincorporated community and census-designated place (CDP) in Sandoval County, New Mexico, United States. It was first listed as a CDP prior to the 2020 census. As of the 2020 census, Rio Rancho Estates had a population of 1,801.

The CDP is in the southern part of the county, bordered to the east and south by the city of Rio Rancho. The southern border of the CDP partially follows the Bernalillo County line. The community is 18 miles (29 km) north-northwest of the center of Albuquerque.

== Demographics ==
Historical population
Census	Pop.	Note	%±
2020	1,801		—
U.S. Decennial Census

== Education ==
Almost all of the CDP is in the Rio Rancho Public Schools. A very small section is in the Jemez Valley Public Schools.
