= Amrep Corporation =

Company in Princeton, United States

AMREP Corporation
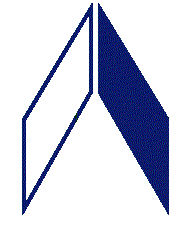
- Company type: Public company
- Traded as: NYSE: AXR; Russell Microcap Index component
- Industry: Land Development, Media Services
- Founded: 1961
- Headquarters: Princeton, New Jersey, United States
- Key people: James Wall (CEO)
- Revenue: ▲US$120M (FY 2010)
- Operating income: ▼US$-11.2M (FY 2010)
- Net income: ▼US$-9.48M (FY 2010)
- Total assets: ▼US$212M (FY 2010)
- Total equity: ▼US$86.6M (FY 2010)
- Number of employees: 2,115 (2008)
- Website: www.amrepcorp.com

AMREP Corporation is a real estate and media services company based in Princeton, New Jersey, in the United States. It was founded in 1961 as The American Realty and Petroleum Corporation.

== Subsidiaries ==
AMREP operates its businesses through two subsidiaries, AMREP Southwest Inc. and Kable Media Services, Inc.

=== Land development ===
AMREP Southwest Inc. operates AMREP's land development division. Shortly after its incorporation, the company purchased 55,000 acres (220 km^{2}) of land just north of Albuquerque, New Mexico, dubbing the new town Rio Rancho, New Mexico. It planned to subdivide and resell it to retirees and out-of-state vacationers. Rio Rancho slowly grew to a population of 1,000 by 1970. In 1971, it purchased an additional 35,000 acres (140 km^{2}) adjacent to the original purchase.

Initially, the company used an aggressive sales approach to reselling the land. They would buy potential customers dinner and show a short video entitled "Your Golden Future" displaying a picturesque retirement. However, the brunt of the sales pitch was the property's supposed value as an investment. In reality, the homes were poor investments because of the ample lots AMREP owned. This effectively created an infinite supply that would keep prices low for years.

This sales approach eventually led to lawsuits and in 1977, AMREP refocused its sales efforts to appeal to local residents. Selling lower cost equivalent homes to residents in the Albuquerque area proved a more legal and lucrative proposition. AMREP utilized a new sales method to go along with the change in target demographics. By offering significant financial incentives to companies to locate there, they would create jobs in the area. The increase in jobs would naturally bring in people creating a demand for housing. These incentives include tax reductions, inexpensive real estate, and subsidies.

In 1981, Intel decided to build a $50 million manufacturing plant because of the incentives AMREP offered. This brought in a significant number of jobs and therefore a significant increase in real estate demand. AMREP would use this incentive-laden method to attract more companies into Rio Rancho.

=== Media services ===
Kable Media Services, Inc. operates AMREP's media services division. It was acquired in the late 1960s as Kable News Company. The division provides fulfillment services for magazines and publishers. It also provides graphic arts and marketing services. Kable Media Services in the second largest subscription fulfillment services in the country. In 2009, Kable Media Services became known as Palm Coast Data after the two locations merged.

== Legal problems ==
In 1975, government regulators brought suit against AMREP for allegedly defrauding 45,000 investors for as much as $200 million. It was claimed that AMREP promised the investors that their real estate investments would double or triple in value in just a few years despite knowing that the land had no resale market. Ultimately, four of the company's officers, President Howard Friedman, Senior Vice President for Sales David Friedman, Executive Vice President Chester Carity, and one of the directors, Henry Hoffman, were sentenced to 6 months in prison and the company was fined $45,000.

Later in 1993, the Federal Trade Commission would bring civil suit against AMREP with the same charges. As a result, there was a settlement of $350,000 given to the 22,000 defrauded land buyers.

AMREP stopped its interstate land sales business which brought forth these issues in 1977. It refocused its real estate division into a land development division selling low-cost housing on its lots that it would sell locally.
