= V. Sue Cleveland High School =

Coordinates: 35°18′45″N 106°38′31″W

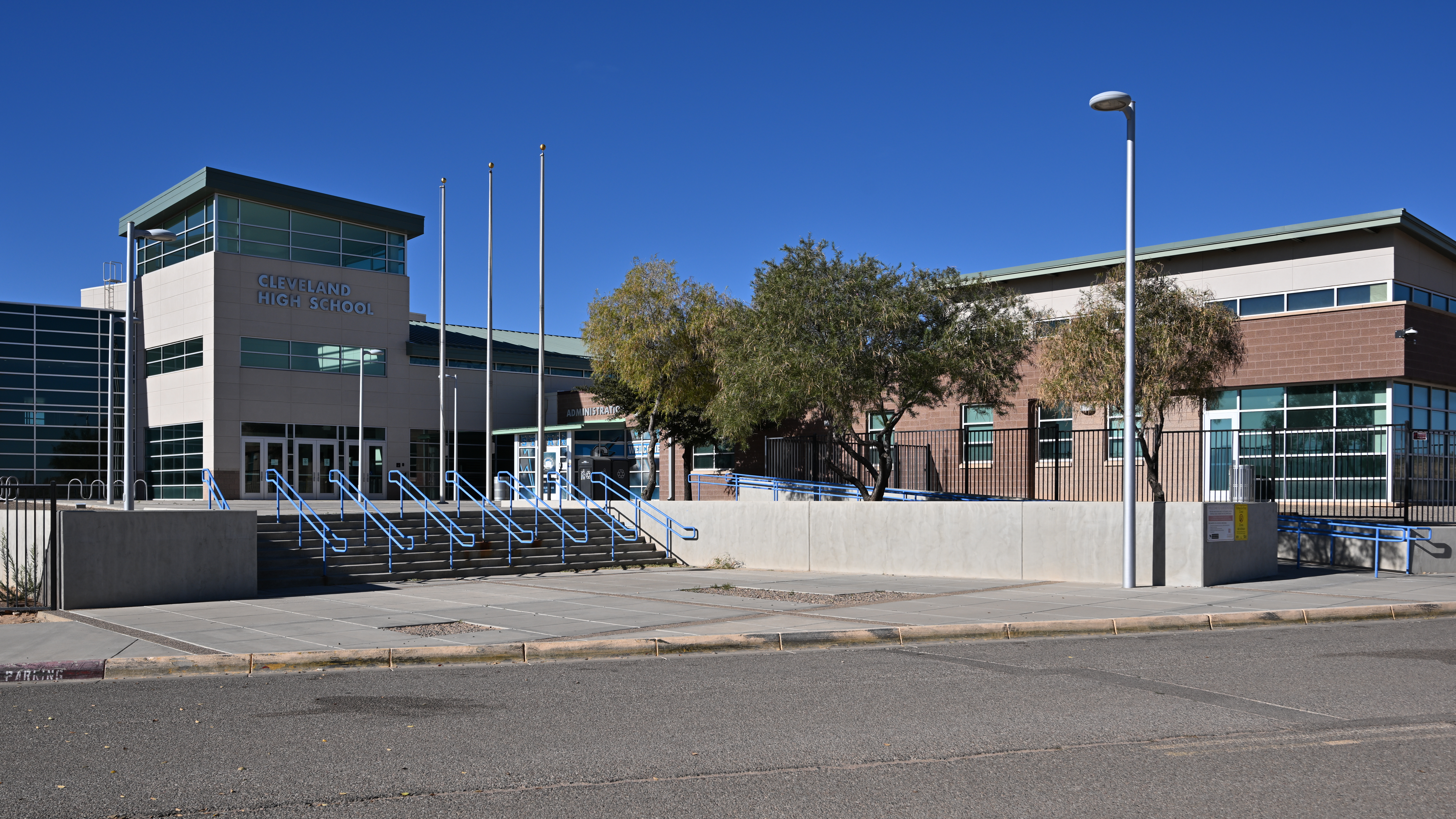

Location
- 4800 Cleveland Heights Rd. NE; Rio Rancho, New Mexico 87144; United States

Information
- Type: Public high school
- Established: 2009
- Principal: Scott Affentranger
- Teaching staff: 122.94 (on an FTE basis)
- Enrollment: 2,600 (2019-20)
- Student to teacher ratio: 20.02
- Campus: Suburban
- Colors: Electric Blue, Silver, and White
- Athletics conference: NMAA, 5A Dist. 1
- Mascot: Storm
- Rival: Rio Rancho High
- Website: cleveland.rrps.net

V. Sue Cleveland High School, or Cleveland High School (CHS), is a public senior high school of the Rio Rancho Public Schools. It is located in north-western Rio Rancho, New Mexico. V. Sue Cleveland was established in 2009, due to overcrowding at Rio Rancho High School. Enrollment at the school stands at approximately 2600. It is the only school in New Mexico named for a former-serving school board official, having been named after the former superintendent of Rio Rancho Public School, Dr. V. Sue Cleveland.

The mascot of CHS is the Storm, their colors are: electric blue, silver and white.

== Athletics ==
CHS competes in the New Mexico Activities Association (NMAA), as a class 5A school in District 1. In 2014, the NMAA realigned the state's schools into six classifications and adjusted district boundaries.

5A/6A NMAA STATE CHAMPIONSHIPS
Season	Sport	Year	Total
Fall	Cross country running, Boys	2020, 2019, 2018, 2017, 2012, 2011	6
Fall	Cross country running, Girls	2017, 2015, 2011	3
Fall	Football	2025, 2024, 2022, 2021, 2019, 2015, 2011	7
Fall	Volleyball	2012	1
Fall	Soccer, Boys	2022, 2018	2
Winter	Wrestling	2017 (6A), 2016 (6A), 2013 (5A tie), 2012 (5A)	4
Spring	Bowling, Boys	2018, 2017, 2015, 2013, 2008 (New Mexico High School Bowling Association)	5
Spring	Golf, Boys	2017, 2015, 2014	3
Spring	Golf, Girls	2019, 2016	2
Spring	Track & Field, Boys	2024, 2023, 2022, 2021, 2019 (5A), 2018 (6A), 2017 (6A), 2016 (6A), 2014 (5A), 2013, 2012	11
Spring	Track & Field, Girls	2016 (6A), 2015 (6A), 2012 (5A)	3
Total			46

== Notable alumni ==
- Nico Muniz – former professional soccer player
- Tre Watson – NFL tight end for the Kansas City Chiefs
