= Rio Rancho, New Mexico =

City in New Mexico, United States

- City
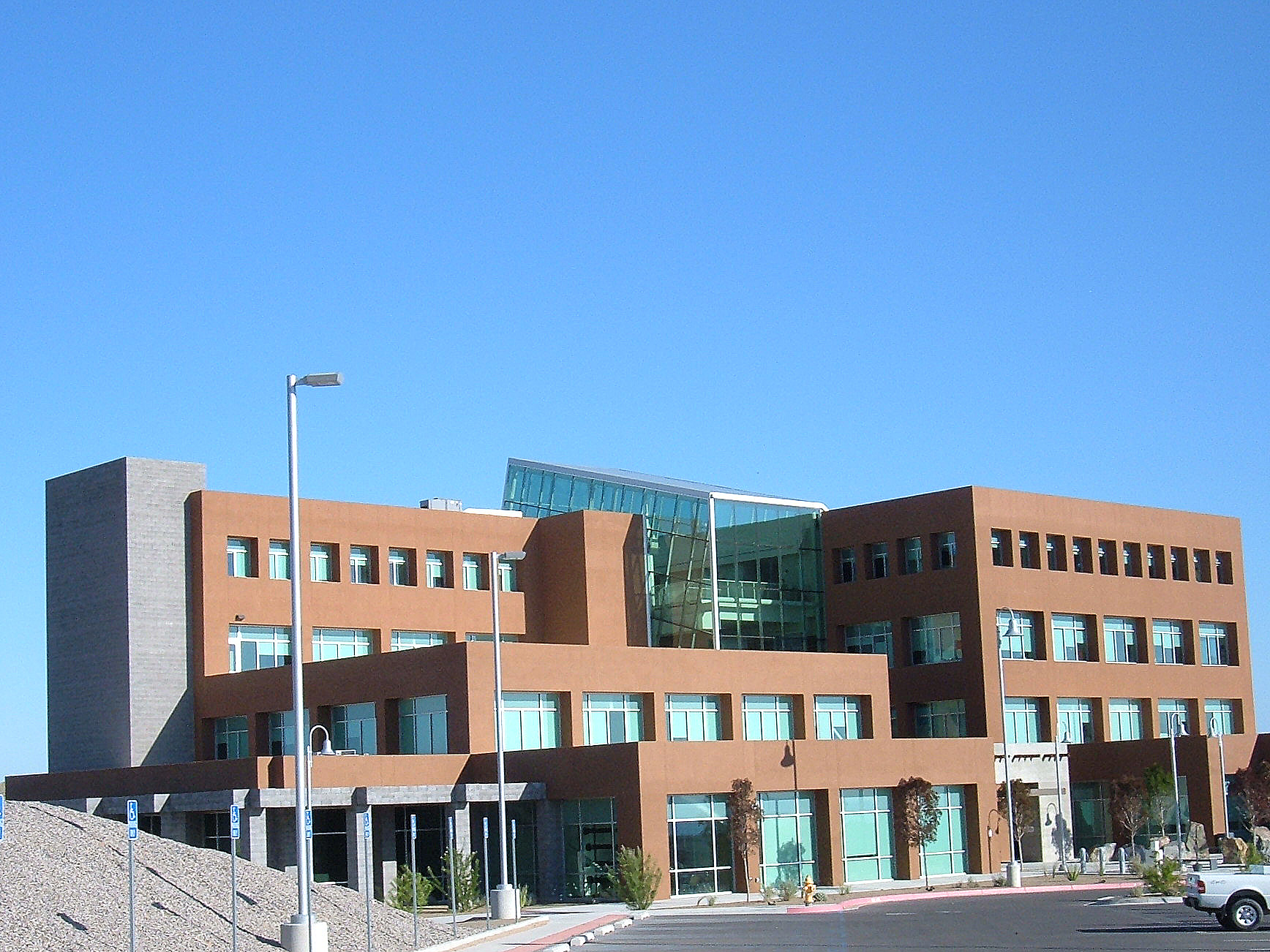
- City Hall

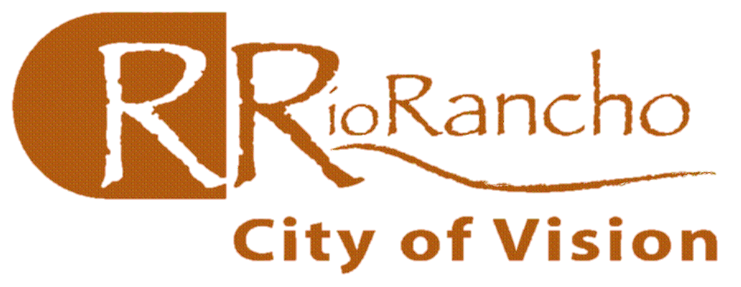
- Seal Logo
- Nickname: "The City of Vision"
- Location within Sandoval County

- Location within New Mexico Location within the United States
- Coordinates: 35°17′10″N 106°40′14″W
- Country: United States
- State: New Mexico
- Counties: Sandoval, Bernalillo
- Founded: 1961
- Incorporated: 1981

Government
  - Mayor: Paul Wymer (R)

Area
  - Total: 103.62 sq mi (268.38 km^{2})
  - Land: 103.36 sq mi (267.70 km^{2})
  - Water: 0.26 sq mi (0.67 km^{2})
- Elevation: 5,509 ft (1,679 m)

Population (2026)
  - Total: 130,157
  - Density: 1,006.6/sq mi (388.66/km^{2})
- Time zone: UTC−07:00 (Mountain)
  - Summer (DST): UTC−06:00 (Mountain)
- ZIP Codes: 87124, 87144, 87174
- Area code: 505
- FIPS code: 35-63460
- GNIS feature ID: 2410954
- Website: rrnm.gov

Rio Rancho (Spanish: Río Rancho) is the largest and most populous city in Sandoval County, New Mexico, United States. A small portion of the city extends into northern Bernalillo County. Part of the expansive Albuquerque metropolitan area, it is the third-largest city in New Mexico, and one of the most rapidly growing. Rio Rancho had a population of 104,046 at the 2020 census. The name Rio Rancho derives from Los Ranchos, the Spanish colonial ranches established along the Rio Grande in the Albuquerque Basin, and throughout historic Nuevo México. There were large ranches also in neighboring Corrales. Since the late 20th century, it has developed as a suburb of Albuquerque.

== History ==
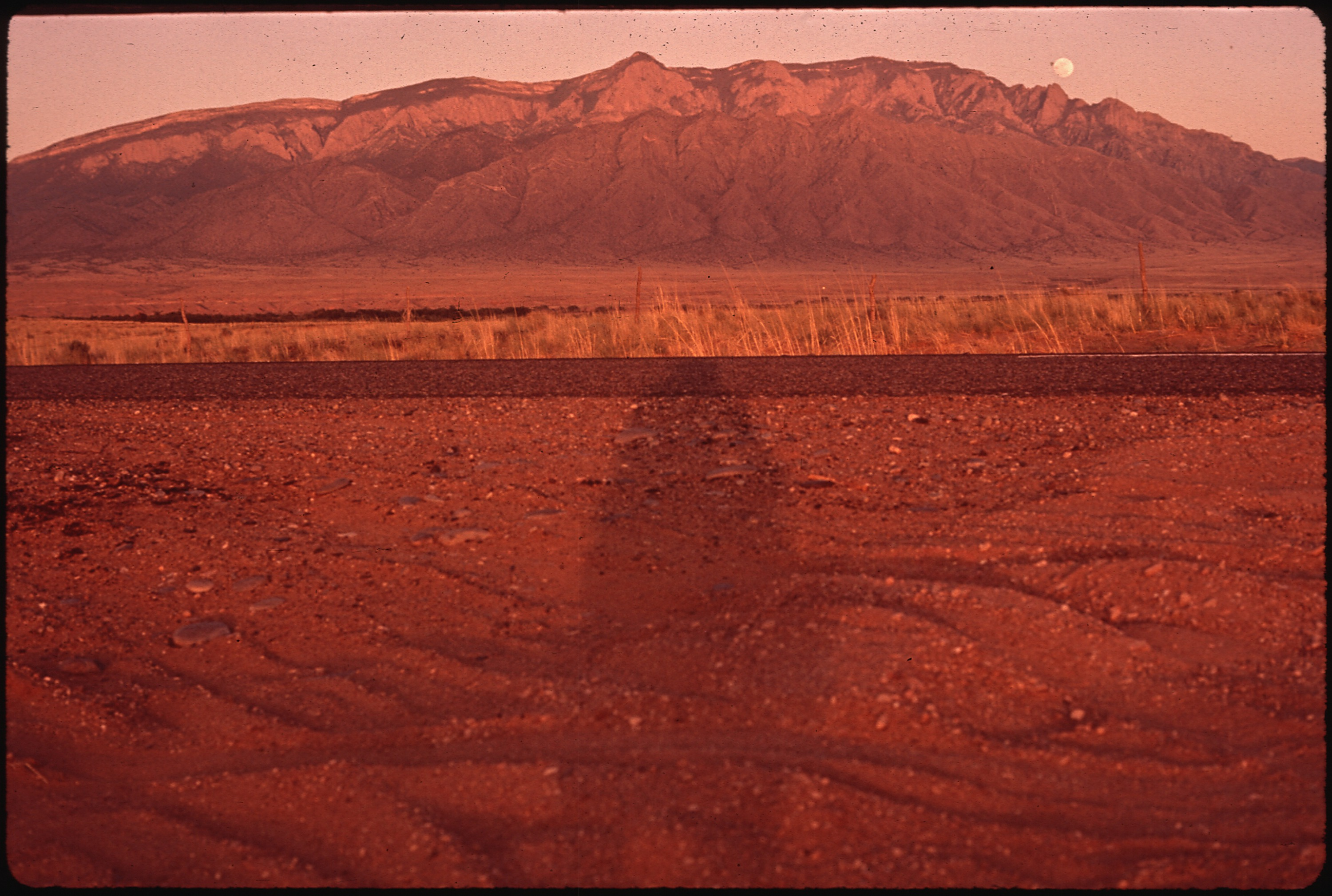
Rio Rancho Estates in 1970, with the Sandia Mountains in the background

The great majority of the territory of Rio Rancho was originally part of the Town of Alameda Grant, which was founded by Spanish colonial settlers in 1710. It was acquired by the United States in 1848, after it defeated Mexico in the Mexican-American War. (Mexico had been independent of Spain since 1821.) The ranches were used for cattle and sheep.

By the early 20th century, much of the land grant had been divided and sold to land investment companies. Its proximity to the city of Albuquerque made it a prime area for suburban development in the post-World War II period. In 1961 Amrep Corporation purchased 55,000 acres (22,000 ha) from Snow Homes the original builder and created a housing development called "Rio Rancho Estates". The first families moved into this development in the early 1960s.

Amrep contracted with Ezio Valentini, one of the original developers of Cape Coral, Florida, to design and implement a marketing plan to encourage land sales. He organized dinner-parties for prospective customers in northern states through offices in 14 states. Migrants were attracted to this area, and the population grew ten-fold between 1970 and 1980. The City of Rio Rancho was incorporated in 1981. The opening of a large Intel Corporation plant in 1981 generated numerous jobs and had positive economic effects for the city.

Since the 1990s, Rio Rancho has taken steps to become more independent from neighboring Albuquerque. It established a separate public unified school district and library system. It is seeking to attract more businesses to the area, so that residents might live and work here.

In the early 21st century, the city worked to create a center: the Downtown City Centre development included a new city hall, a new University of New Mexico West and Central New Mexico Community College campus, and the Santa Ana Star Center. The sports and live event arena opened in October 2006. City Hall opened in September 2007.

== Geography ==
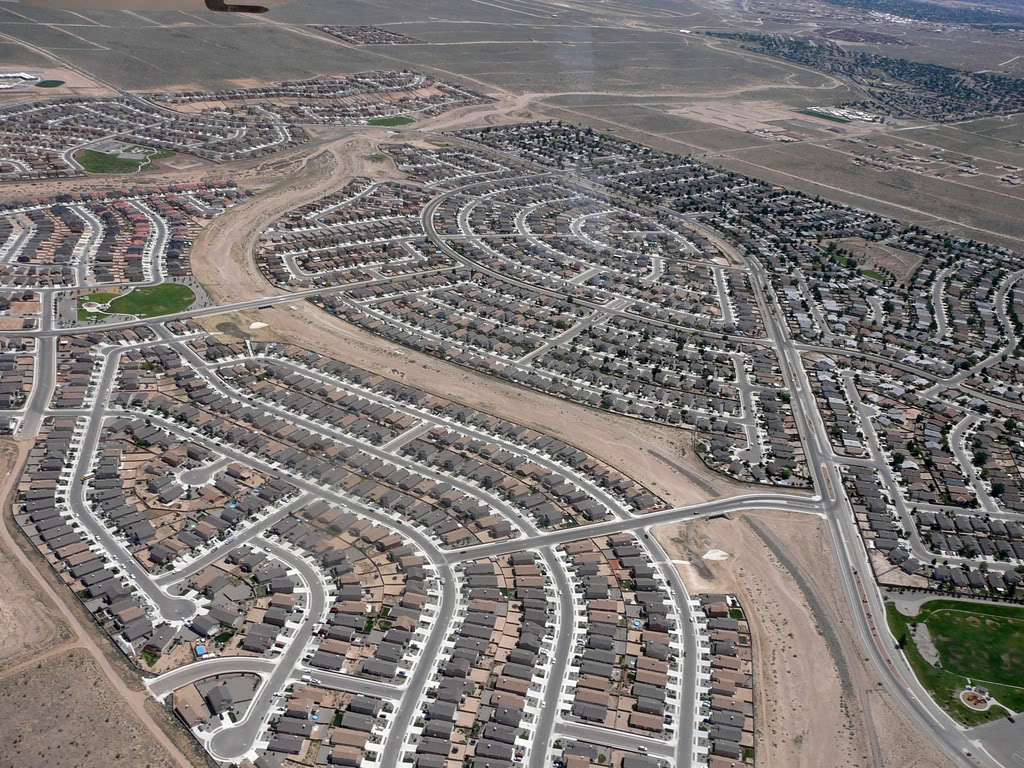
Aerial view of suburban Rio Rancho

Rio Rancho lies in the Albuquerque Basin to the west of the Rio Grande, which is a boundary on the northeast corner of the city. An escarpment lies to the west of the city limit.

Rio Rancho is bordered by Albuquerque to the south, the Santa Ana Pueblo to the north, with the town of Bernalillo and village of Corrales to the east.

According to the United States Census Bureau, the city has a total area of 103.7 sq mi (268.5 km^{2}), of which 103.4 square miles (267.7 km^{2}) is land and 0.31 sq mi (0.8 km^{2}), or 0.31%, is covered by water.

=== Climate ===
Rio Rancho is in an arid climate due to its location in the rain shadow of the Sandia Mountains to the east and the Continental Divide to the west. Rio Rancho receives 8.90 inches (226 mm) of precipitation annually on average. The western portion of the city receives slightly more rain and snowfall due to its higher elevation than that of the more densely developed eastern portion of Rio Rancho.

Climate data for Rio Rancho, New Mexico (1981–2010 normals)
Month	Jan	Feb	Mar	Apr	May	Jun	Jul	Aug	Sep	Oct	Nov	Dec	Year
Record high °F (°C)	74 (23)	82 (28)	90 (32)	94 (34)	107 (42)	108 (42)	111 (44)	106 (41)	102 (39)	95 (35)	83 (28)	75 (24)	111 (44)
Mean daily maximum °F (°C)	53 (12)	59 (15)	67 (19)	76 (24)	85 (29)	94 (34)	96 (36)	93 (34)	87 (31)	76 (24)	62 (17)	53 (12)	75 (24)
Mean daily minimum °F (°C)	30 (−1)	34 (1)	39 (4)	45 (7)	53 (12)	61 (16)	68 (20)	68 (20)	59 (15)	47 (8)	37 (3)	30 (−1)	48 (9)
Record low °F (°C)	5 (−15)	8 (−13)	18 (−8)	26 (−3)	37 (3)	46 (8)	51 (11)	49 (9)	41 (5)	23 (−5)	17 (−8)	4 (−16)	4 (−16)
Average precipitation inches (mm)	0.33 (8.4)	0.38 (9.7)	0.65 (17)	0.50 (13)	0.49 (12)	0.58 (15)	1.26 (32)	1.72 (44)	0.99 (25)	0.95 (24)	0.58 (15)	0.47 (12)	8.90 (226)
Source: Weather Channel

== Demographics ==
Historical population
Census	Pop.	Note	%±
1980	9,985		—
1990	32,551		226.0%
2000	51,765		59.0%
2010	87,521		69.1%
2020	104,046		18.9%
Sources: 1980–2000

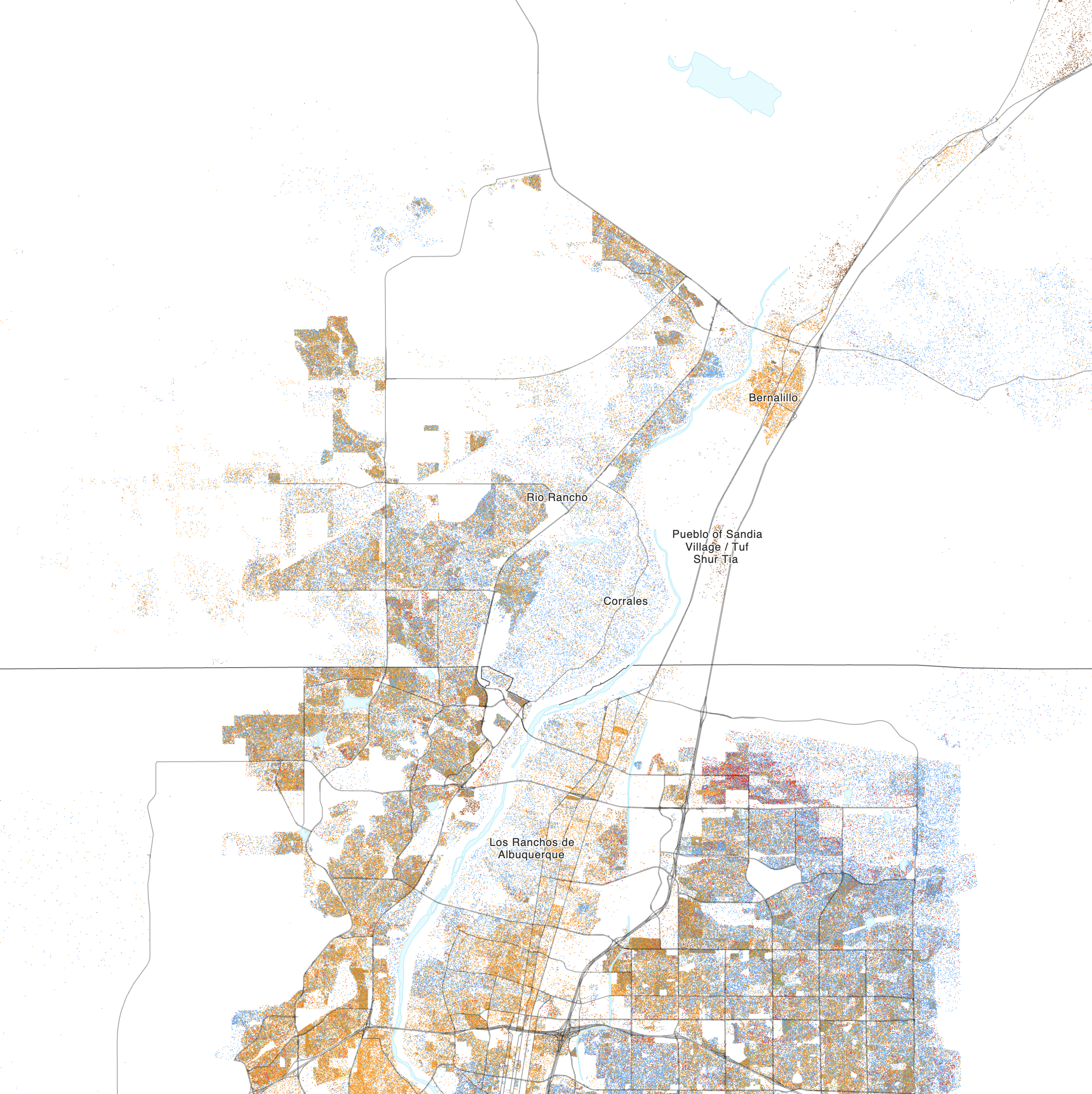
Map of racial distribution in Rio Rancho, 2020 U.S. census. Each dot is one person: ⬤ White ⬤ Black ⬤ Asian ⬤ Hispanic ⬤ Multiracial ⬤ Native American/Other

=== 2020 census ===
Rio Rancho, New Mexico – Racial and ethnic composition Note: the US Census treats Hispanic/Latino as an ethnic category. This table excludes Latinos from the racial categories and assigns them to a separate category. Hispanics/Latinos may be of any race.
Race / Ethnicity (NH = Non-Hispanic)	Pop. 2000	Pop. 2010	Pop. 2020	% 2000	% 2010	% 2020
White alone (NH)	33,176	47,124	48,168	64.09%	53.84%	46.29%
Black or African American alone (NH)	1,286	2,236	2,559	2.48%	2.55%	2.46%
Native American or Alaska Native alone (NH)	1,023	2,242	3,353	1.98%	2.56%	3.22%
Asian alone (NH)	736	1,538	2,011	1.42%	1.76%	1.93%
Pacific Islander alone (NH)	80	122	140	0.15%	0.14%	0.13%
Other race alone (NH)	109	203	499	0.21%	0.23%	0.48%
Mixed race or Multiracial (NH)	1,026	1,903	3,982	1.98%	2.17%	3.83%
Hispanic or Latino (any race)	14,329	32,153	43,334	27.68%	36.74%	41.65%
Total	51,765	87,251	104,046	100.00%	100.00%	100.00%

Of 18,995 households, 40.3% had children under the age of 18 living with them, 59.4% were married couples living together, 10.3% had a female householder with no husband present, and 25.7% were not families; 20.8% of all households were made up of individuals, and 7.9% had someone living alone who was 65 years of age or older. The average household size was 2.70 and the average family size was 3.14.

In the city, the population was distributed as 29.2% under the age of 18, 7.0% from 18 to 24, 32.0% from 25 to 44, 20.1% from 45 to 64, and 11.7% who were 65 years of age or older. The median age was 35 years. For every 100 females, there were 94.2 males. For every 100 females age 18 and over, there were 89.9 males.

The median income for city was $47,169, and for a family was $52,233. Males had a median income of $39,162 versus $27,385 for females. The per capita income for the city was $20,322. About 3.7% of families and 5.1% of the population were below the poverty line, including 5.1% of those under age 18 and 5.8% of those age 65 or over.

== Economy ==
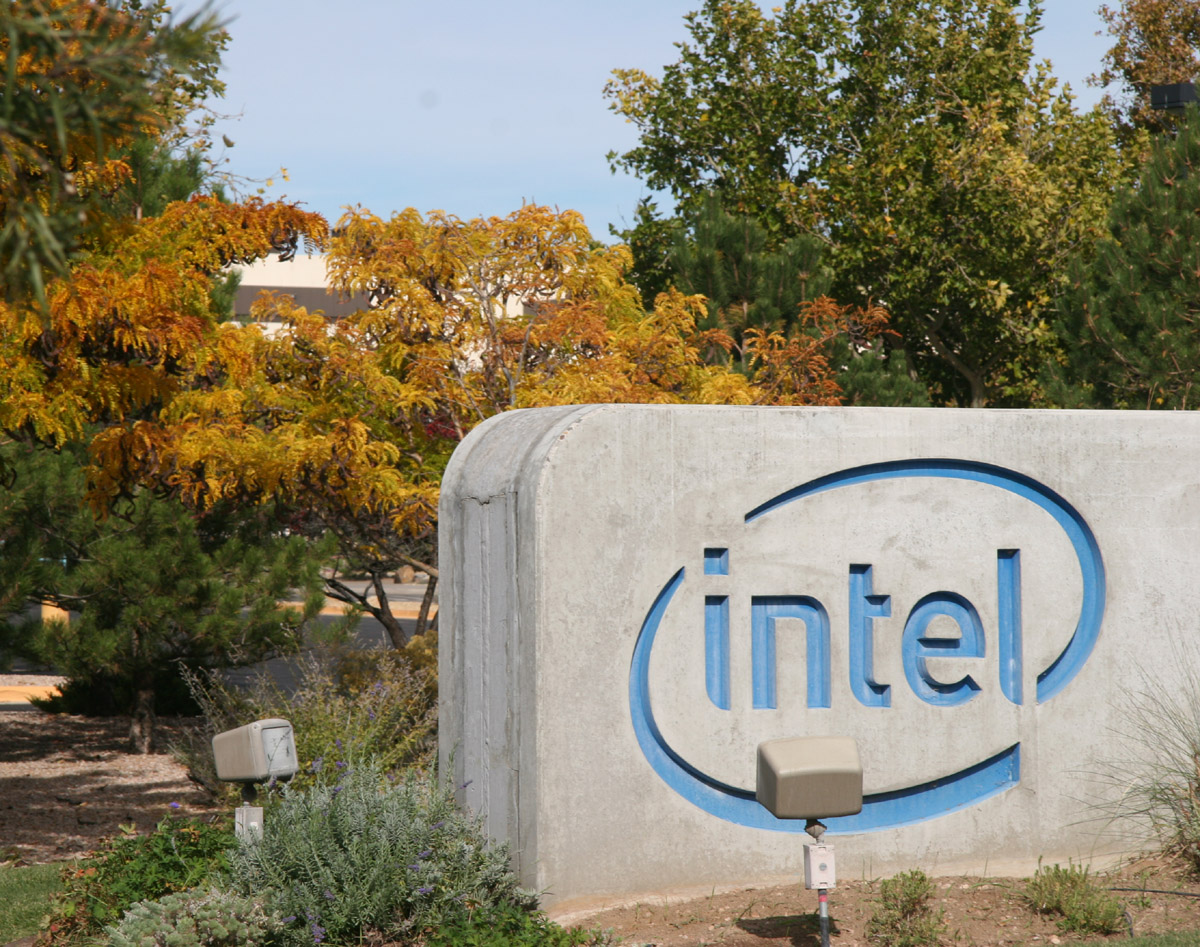
In the mid-1980s, Intel established a manufacturing plant in the city.

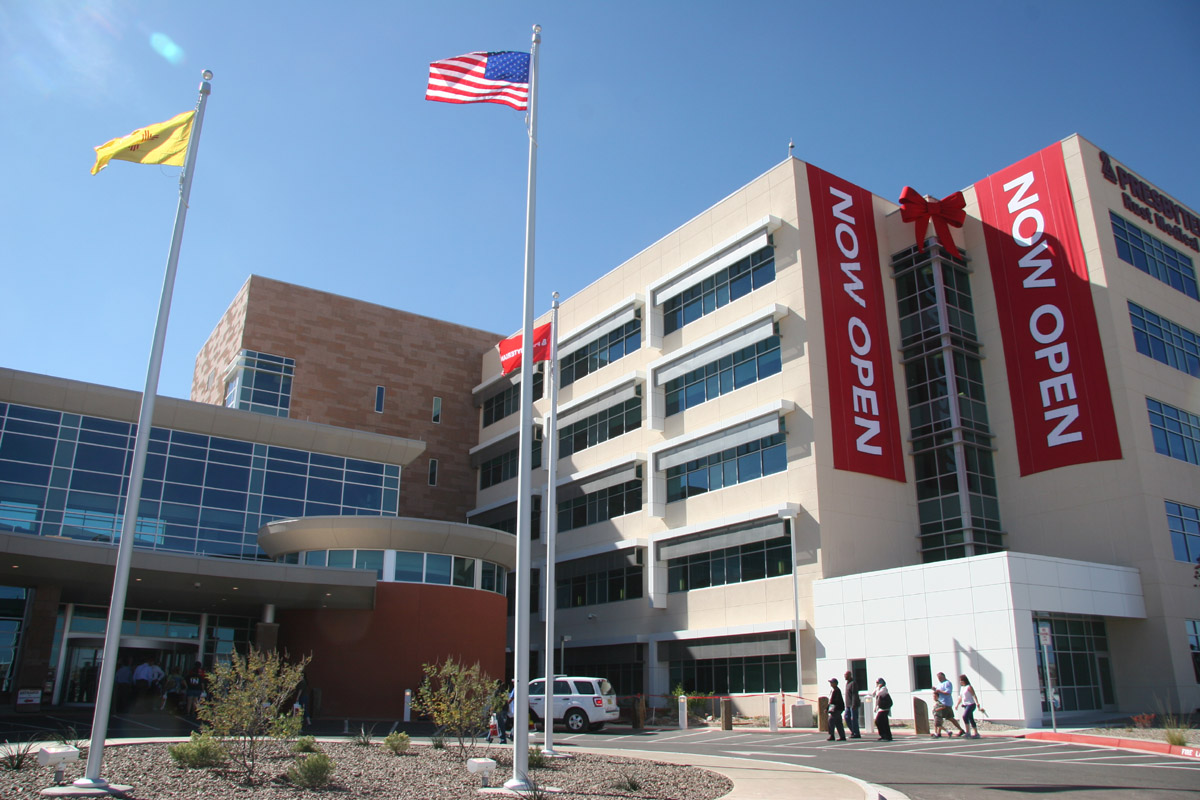
Rust Medical Center opened in 2011.

Intel is by far the largest employer in Rio Rancho. The services, retail, and government sectors are also major components of the local economy. Rio Rancho is the site of Intel's Fab 11X, one of the largest semiconductor fabrication plants in the world. The fully automated, $2 billion facility opened in 2002 and was the first Intel plant to manufacture 300 mm silicon wafers, which can hold almost twice as many chips as the standard 200 mm wafers. Fab 7, Intel's original Rio Rancho plant, which opened in 1980, closed in 2002, but was converted into a test facility in 2005.

In 2005, Rio Rancho became the first U.S. city to offer citywide voice-over-WiFi (VoWiFi) service. Several call centers are located in Rio Rancho. Walmart opened in early summer of 2006 in Rio Rancho, and was a catalyst for related commercial retailers to locate nearby.

An Albuquerque-based incubator and co-working space FatPipe opened a satellite office in Rio Rancho. It is intended to spur business innovation and startups within the city. Fatpipe closed its Rio Rancho location in 2024.

=== Housing and development ===
In the aftermath of the collapse of the 2008 housing bubble, foreclosure activity increased in the city. The economies of Sandoval, Bernalillo, and Valencia counties suffered markedly in the late 2000s recession.

As of the late 2010s, housing had entirely recovered. A number of new housing developments were restarted. Real estate sales were robust in 2020 in many areas of Rio Rancho, driven by low interest rates and relatively low housing prices ($250,000 – $350,000 for most new construction).

As of 2026, projects like Stone Head and East Arrowhead are being developed to bring more commerce and housing to Rio Rancho

=== Taxation ===
In 2010 a 5% water rate increase and $3 water rights surcharge was initiated.

=== Tourism ===
In 2017, Rio Rancho hosted the National Speleological Society's annual convention.

The city constructed A Park Above, a structure in the south of the city for youth recreation.

== Sports ==
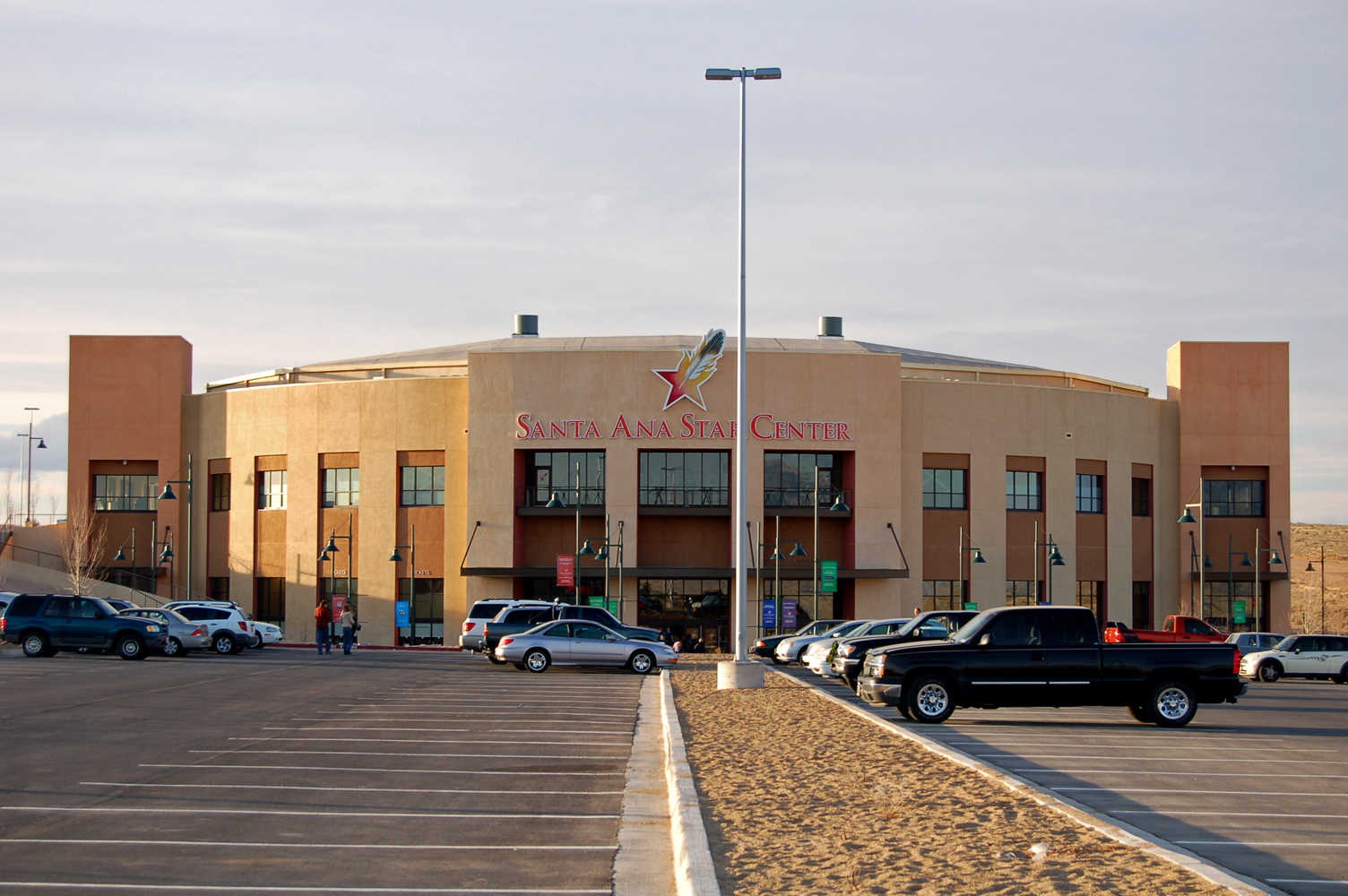
Santa Ana Star Center

=== Professional hockey ===
In May 2025, the ECHL announced the addition of a new expansion team based in Rio Rancho, marking the return of professional hockey to New Mexico. The team named the New Mexico Goatheads, was announced on September 29, 2025 and is scheduled to begin play in the 2026–27 season at the Rio Rancho Events Center.

The franchise is owned and operated by Rev Entertainment and is affiliated with the National Hockey League's (NHL) Colorado Avalanche, and American Hockey League's (AHL) Colorado Eagles. On June 20, 2026 the Franchise named their first head coach, Zack Stortini, who played 14 seasons with the Edmonton Oilers and Nashville Predators. Prior to joining New Mexico as head coach, Coach Stortini was an assistant coach for the AHL's Tucson Roadrunners and Ontario Hockey League's (OHL) Sudbury Wolves.

=== Previous teams ===
A fan poll to determine the team's permanent name is expected to conclude in late 2025, with an official name announcement to follow.

Rio Rancho was home to the New Mexico Scorpions minor-league ice hockey team, which relocated from Albuquerque in 2006, until the team ceased operations in 2009. The Scorpions played at Santa Ana Star Center.

In the spring of 2008, the Star Center became the home of the New Mexico Wildcats indoor football team. They lasted two seasons, folding at the conclusion of 2009.

Starting in fall of 2010, the Star Center was home to the New Mexico Thunderbirds of the NBA Development League and the New Mexico Mustangs of the North American Hockey League (NAHL). The Mustangs' NAHL membership was transferred to Richfield, Minnesota, in 2012. The New Mexico Thunderbirds announced in July 2011 that the team was sold to the Cleveland Cavaliers and will be moved to Canton, Ohio, for the upcoming season.

Since 2015, Rio Rancho has been the location of the New Mexico Chupacabras (formerly Duke City Gladiators), a professional indoor football team. They play home games at the Santa Ana Star Center, with whom they signed a five-year contract.

== Government ==
Mayor Gregg Hull ran at-large for mayor in 2014. He was re-elected for a second term in March 2018 and a third term in March 2022. City council members are elected from six single-member districts. The judge for the Municipal Court is also elected.

Name	Position	Party reg.	Took office	Up for re–election
Paul Wymer	Mayor	Republican	2026	2030
Deborah Dapson	District 1	Democrat	2024	2028
Jeremy Lenintine	District 2	Republican	2020	2026
Bob Tyler	District 3	Republican	2018	2026
VACANT	District 4	N/A	N/A	2028
VACANT	District 5	N/A	N/A	2026
Nicole List	District 6	Republican	2023	2028

=== Politics ===
Voter Registration and Party Enrollment as of February 1, 2018
Party	Number of Voters	Percentage
Democratic	9,788	22.06%
Republican	19,674	44.34%
Unaffiliated/Minor Parties	14,913	33.61%
Total	44,375	100%

Rio Rancho is the site of the Sandoval County Municipal Courthouse. It serves as a hub for judicial affairs in the county.

== Education ==
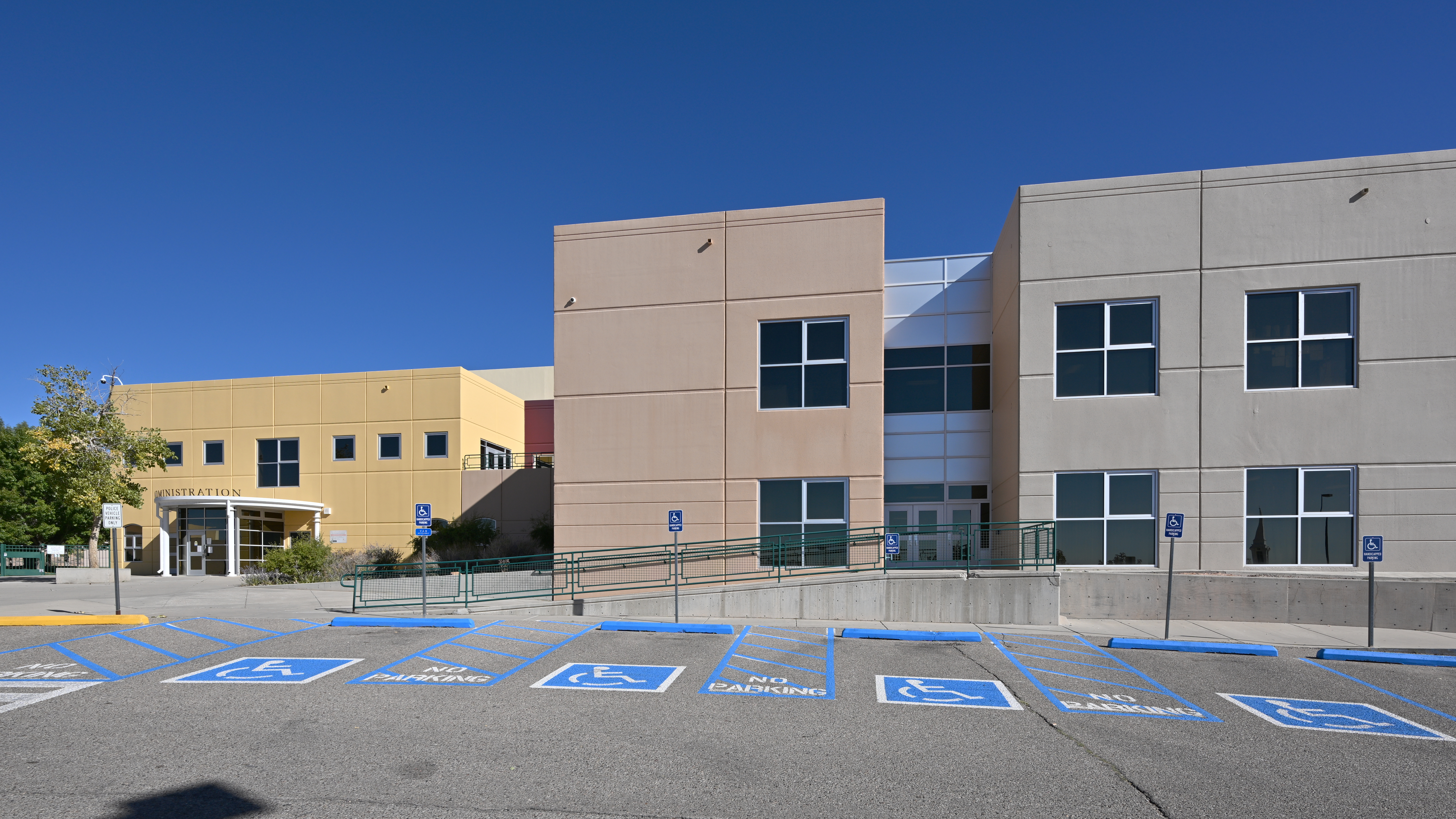
Rio Rancho High School

The University of New Mexico has a satellite campus in Rio Rancho devoted to health sciences. Central New Mexico Community College also has one of its eight campuses in Rio Rancho's downtown area, within walking distance of the UNM campus.

Rio Rancho Public Schools serve students in most of Rio Rancho. Rio Rancho has two major public high schools: Rio Rancho High School and V. Sue Cleveland High School.

Portions of Rio Rancho in Sandoval County extend into the Jemez Valley Public Schools school district. Sections of Rio Rancho in most of Bernalillo County are zoned to Albuquerque Public Schools. A portion of the Rio Rancho Public School District extends into Bernalillo County. In addition, Rio Rancho has two public charter schools called The ASK Academy and Cyber Academy, serving grades 6–12. They both focus on science, technology, engineering, and mathematics (STEM) education.

== Media ==
Rio Rancho is home to the Albuquerque metro area's only oldies-format radio station, KDSK (AM). It moved into this market in March 2015 and licensed its newest FM signal, 92.9 FM, to Rio Rancho in April 2016. The station is named "Rio Rancho Radio". The station features Rio Rancho area events and airs a weekly talk/discussion show on Sunday mornings with the Mayor of Rio Rancho (now Greg Hull). The station signal, broadcast on three frequencies (92.7 FM, 93.7 FM, and 1240 AM), serves the entire Albuquerque metro area, and six counties in central and western New Mexico. Residents also have access to television and radio broadcasts from Albuquerque.

The weekly Rio Rancho Observer is the local newspaper. Residents may also subscribe to the daily newspaper Albuquerque Journal, which has a localized weekly version called Rio West.

Rio Rancho is served by a government-access television channel available only through the city's only cable television provider Cable ONE. This channel shows all of the government meetings multiple times.

== Transportation ==
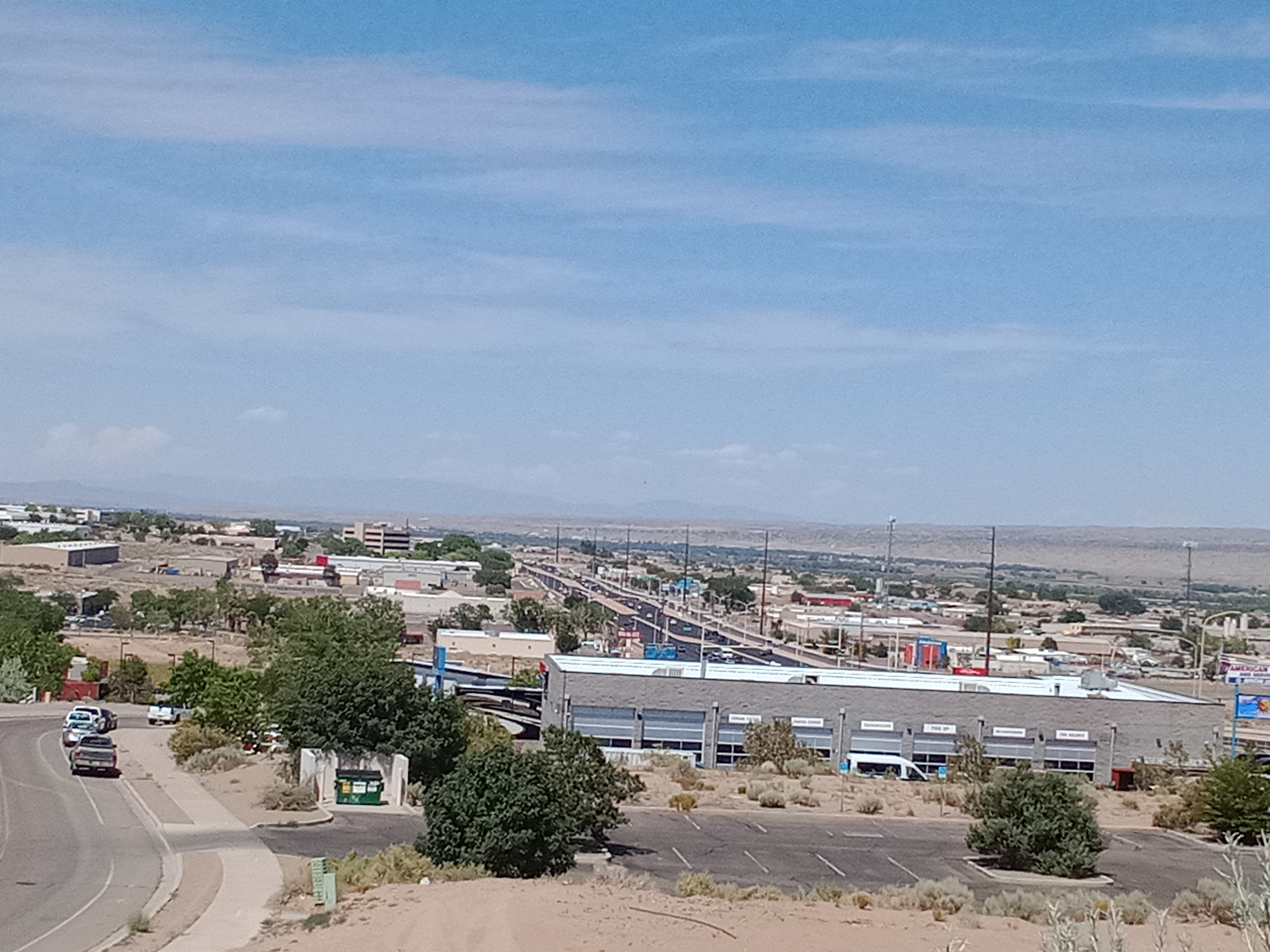
View looking north in east New Mexico near 528 Highway

Albuquerque's transit department, ABQ RIDE, operates a bus route (251 Albuquerque-Rio Rancho Rail Runner Connection) connecting Rio Rancho with the New Mexico Rail Runner Express station at Journal Center.

In late January 2011, ABQ RIDE extended two additional routes (96 Crosstown Commuter and 155 Coors Blvd), and introduced an additional route (551 Jefferson/Paseo Del Norte Express) into Rio Rancho. The northern terminus of these routes is at Southern Blvd and Unser Blvd.

The Rio Metro Regional Transportation District operates Rio Transit, a door-to-door paratransit service for senior citizens 55 years of age and older, and disabled adults 18 years of age and older, for residents of Rio Rancho. The service is operated from the Meadowlark Senior Center, and provides service Monday-Friday from 7:30 am to 3:00 pm. Riders must register with the service prior to using it and reserve time slots well in advance.

Rio Metro RTD also operates a commuter bus route serving the Enchanted Hills neighborhood in Rio Rancho. This service connects residents of Enchanted Hills to the US 550 New Mexico Rail Runner station and provides service during the morning and evening commutes. Rio Metro Bus connections are available at the US 550 Rail Runner station for Zia Pueblo, San Ysidro, Canon, and Jemez Springs. A Rio Metro commuter bus route provides service to and from the Cuba NM area, with a Park and Ride designated at Home Depot, which is located near the corner of NM 528, NM 550. Rio Metro's website and schedules may be viewed at: www.riometro.org

== Notable people ==
- Jay C. Block, member of the New Mexico Senate
- Alan Branch, NFL player
- Craig Brandt, member of the New Mexico Senate
- Patrick M. Brenner, nonprofit executive and political commentator
- Jason Harper, engineer and member of the New Mexico House of Representatives
- Norio Hayakawa, activist and ufologist
- Joshua Hernandez, member of the New Mexico House of Representatives
- Tim Lewis, member of the New Mexico House of Representatives
- Sean McPherson, former member of the South Dakota House of Representatives
- Vaunda Micheaux Nelson, librarian and author
- Blake Swihart, MLB catcher
- Richard V. Thomas, former member of the Wyoming Supreme Court
- Tre Watson, NFL player
- Chris Williams, NFL and CFL wide receiver
