= Vulcan (inactive volcano) =

Inactive volcano in New Mexico, U.S.

Coordinates: 35°8′29.0″N 106°46′19.1″W

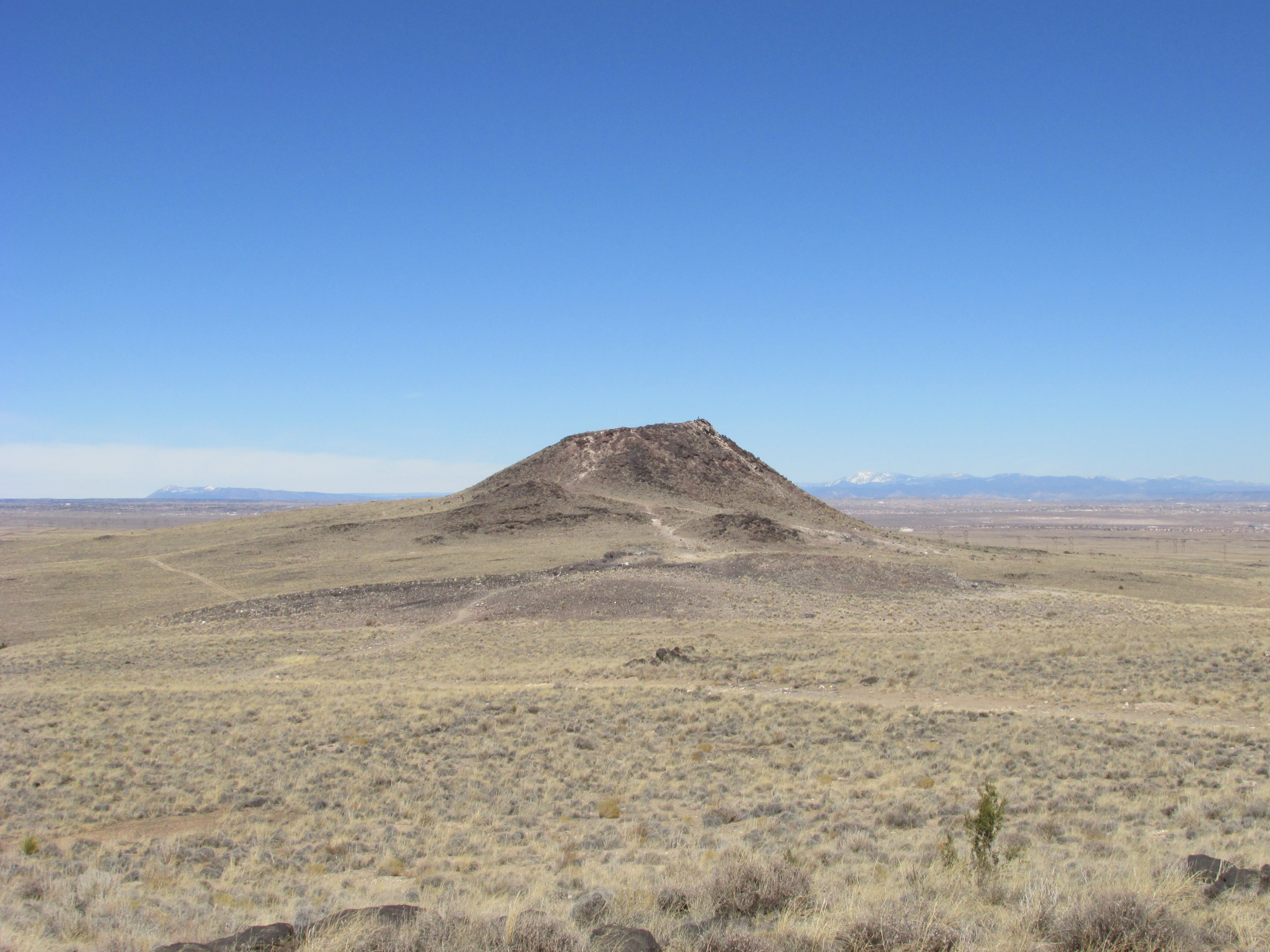

Highest point
- Elevation: 6,033 ft (1,839 m)
- Prominence: 600 ft (180 m)

Geography
- Location: Petroglyph National Monument Bernalillo County, New Mexico, U.S.

Geology
- Rock age: > 10,000 years
- Mountain type: Spatter cone
- Last eruption: 150,000+ years ago

Vulcan, named after the Roman god of fire, is an inactive volcano on the West Mesa near Albuquerque, New Mexico. It is the largest of six volcanoes in the Albuquerque volcanic field within Petroglyph National Monument. Vulcan is a spatter cone volcano, formed primarily by lava fountains that were active in the central vent and in smaller vents on flanks of the cone. These flank vents formed the arches and caves seen today. It is believed to have last erupted around 150,000 years ago.

== Description ==
Vulcan rises 600 feet (180 m) above the valley floor. From that vantage point, the alignment of the five-mile (8.0 km) long chain of vents is particularly noticeable. Splatter forms when blobs of lava are emitted from a vent and cool as they fly through the air, and the partially molten blobs then land on the side of the cone to weld together to form a hard crust. Fragmented cinder and spatter material and lava flows dip at angles as high as 55° away from the central vent on the eastern and southern side of Vulcan. The spatter material is thickest on the southeastern side of Vulcan, indicating that it was blown by the wind toward the south and east during the fountaining events. A solidified lava pond that consists of a massive gray basalt with weakly developed columnar jointing occupies the crater of Vulcan. Radial, sinuous lava tubes 8 to 20 inches (200 to 510 mm) across and 300 feet (91 m) long are preserved on the northeast and northwest flanks of Vulcan.

== Location ==
Vulcan lies in a large geological zone known as the Rio Grande rift, which follows the Rio Grande from southern Colorado through El Paso, Texas, after which it becomes indistinguishable from the Range and Basin province of northern Mexico. This rent in the Earth's surface, where two land masses are pulling away from one another, is responsible for much of the volcanic activity and mountain-building that occurs throughout the area.

Vulcan lies in Petroglyph National Monument, with access to the volcanoes during business hours, after which any vehicles are locked in and subject to fines and impound. It rests in a volcanic field approximately seven miles (11 km). northwest of Albuquerque. To the south are the volcanoes Black, followed by JA volcano. To the north lie Bond and Butte volcanoes and the Jemez Mountains. To the west is the giant stratovolcano Mount Taylor (Navajo: Tsoodził, The Turquoise Mountain), and to the east are the cities of Rio Rancho, Albuquerque, the village of Corrales, and the Sandia Mountains.

== History ==
Vulcan is believed to have last erupted around 150,000 years ago. The volcanoes of the field are classified as inactive (or dormant). Earth and space-based geodetic measurements indicate ongoing surface uplift above the Socorro Magma Body at approximately two millimetres (0.1 in)/year.

From 1951 to 1973, a large letter J representing the College of St. Joseph on the Rio Grande (later renamed the University of Albuquerque) was painted on the eastern slope of the volcano. Because of this, Vulcan was also sometimes referred to as the "J Volcano" or "J Cone." The J was repainted each fall by the college's incoming freshman class. In 1973, the J was "erased" by painting over the whitewash with a dark-colored stain, though it is still faintly visible.
