= Albuquerque volcanic field =

Volcanic field in the Albuquerque Basin in New Mexico, United States

Coordinates: 35.142°N 106.772°W

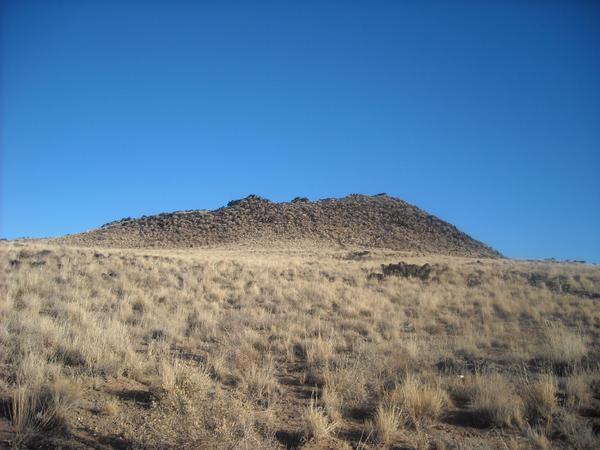
JA Volcano, as seen from its western flank, at Petroglyph National Monument in New Mexico

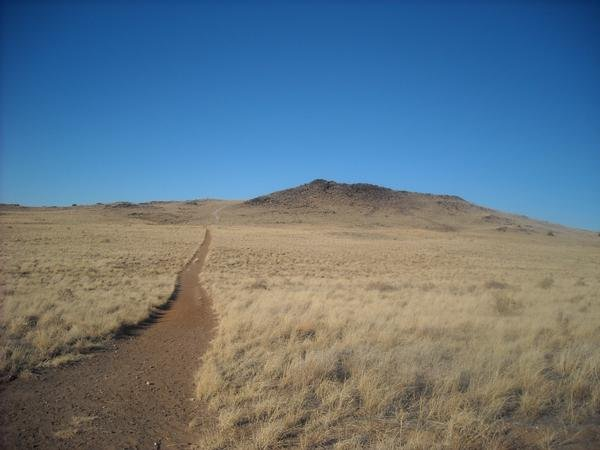
Black Volcano in Petroglyph National Monument, as seen from its south, at the trail head connecting it to JA volcano on January 14, 2009

The Albuquerque volcanic field is a monogenetic volcanic field in the Albuquerque Basin in New Mexico, United States. It is located about 7 miles (11 km) west of the city of Albuquerque, and is contained within the borders of Petroglyph National Monument. The field was active from 190,000 to 155,000 years ago and includes lava flows, cinder cones, and spatter cones. The oldest lava flows cover about 23 square miles (60 km^{2}). The cones are aligned and possibly formed above two roughly north-south trending fissures. Vulcan (also called J Volcano) is the highest feature. Its base is made of cinder, but the crater contains a lava dome that was cut by an explosive eruption.

== Notable vents ==
The field consists of six named volcanoes. From north to south, they are

- Butte Volcano, elevation 5,886 feet (1,794 m)
- Bond Volcano, elevation 5,879 feet (1,792 m)
- Vulcan or J Volcano, elevation 6,030 feet (1,840 m)
- Cinder Volcano, elevation 5,902 feet (1,799 m)
- Black Volcano, elevation 5,974 feet (1,821 m)
- JA Volcano, elevation 5,948 feet (1,813 m)

Cinder Volcano has little topographical prominence and is not usually considered one of the main volcanoes. The cone was much higher in the past but was substantially eroded by mining activity, with the cinder material extracted for use in landscaping, cinder blocks, and railroad beds.

The three closely spaced southern volcanoes, JA, Black, and Vulcan, are sometimes collectively referred to as the "Three Sisters". These three volcanoes are accessible by hiking trails and a parking area administered as part of Petroglyph National Monument.

=== Vulcan ===
The largest of the cones in the Albuquerque volcanic field is Vulcan, named after the Roman god of fire. From a vantage point on top of the cone 200 feet above mesa, the alignment of the 5-mile-long chain of vents is particularly noticeable. Vulcan is a spatter cone, formed primarily by fire fountains that were active in the central vent and in smaller vents on flanks of the cone. (Spatter forms when blobs of lava are emitted from a vent, and cool as they fly through the air, and the partially molten blobs then land on the side of the cone to weld together to form a hard crust.) Fragmented cinder and spatter material and lava flows dip at angles as high as 55° away from the central vent on the eastern and southern side of the Vulcan. The spatter material is thickest on the southeastern side of Vulcan, indicating that it was blown by the wind toward the south and east during the fountaining events. A solidified lava pond that consists of a massive gray basalt with weakly developed columnar jointing occupies the crater of Vulcan. Radial, sinuous lava tubes 8 to 20 inches across and 300 feet long are preserved on the northeast and northwest flanks of Vulcan.

=== Black Volcano ===
Black Volcano is an inactive volcano near Albuquerque, New Mexico. Black Volcano is directly north of JA volcano. Black Volcano is the second of five volcanoes (traveling south to north) within the western boundary of Petroglyph National Monument. North of Black Volcano are Vulcan, Bond and Butte volcanoes. The date of its last eruption is unknown, but is believed to have been more than 150,000 years ago.

=== JA Volcano ===
JA Volcano is an inactive volcano located near Albuquerque, New Mexico. It is the southernmost in the chain of five volcanoes within the western edge of Petroglyph National Monument.

== See also ==
- List of volcanoes in the United States of America
- List of volcanic fields
