= Black Volcano =

Volcano near Albuquerque, New Mexico, USA

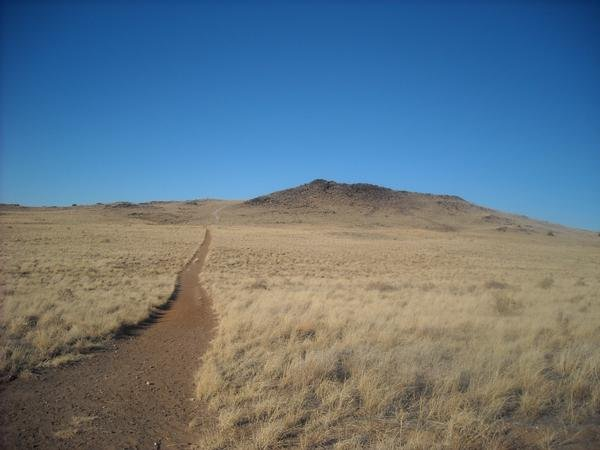
- Black Volcano in Petroglyph National Monument, as seen from its south, at the trail head connecting it to JA volcano on January 14, 2009

Highest point
- Elevation: 5,986 ft (1,825 m)
- Prominence: 155 ft (47 m)
- Coordinates: 35.1325°N 106.7727°W

Geography
- Location: Petroglyph National Monument, Bernalillo County, New Mexico, US

Geology
- Rock age: older than 10,000 years
- Mountain type: Fissure vent
- Last eruption: 150,000+ years ago

Black Volcano is an inactive volcano located near Albuquerque, New Mexico, and is part of the Albuquerque volcanic field. Black Volcano is located directly north of JA volcano. Black Volcano is the second of five volcanoes (traveling south to north) within the western boundary of Petroglyph National Monument. North of Black Volcano are Vulcan, Bond and Butte volcanoes. JA, Black, and Vulcan Volcanoes are located along a single fissure through which the lava erupted. The volcanoes are a rare example of a series of vents associated with a fissure eruption.

The volcano is composed of a type of volcanic rock called olivine tholeiitic basalt. Radiometric dating indicates an age for this rock of about 156,000 years. The volcano consists of lava flows radiation from the summit, which has a small pyroclastic cone and a large filled crater. Several smaller craters, formed late in the eruption, are located on the summit and northeast flank of the volcano. Much of the pyroclastic cone was removed by mining of cinder by 1978.

The northern part of the cone includes xenoliths, pieces of surrounding rock caught up in the eruption and carried to the surface. These are partially melted sandstone, likely of the Santa Fe Group sediments on which the volcano sits.

== Gallery ==
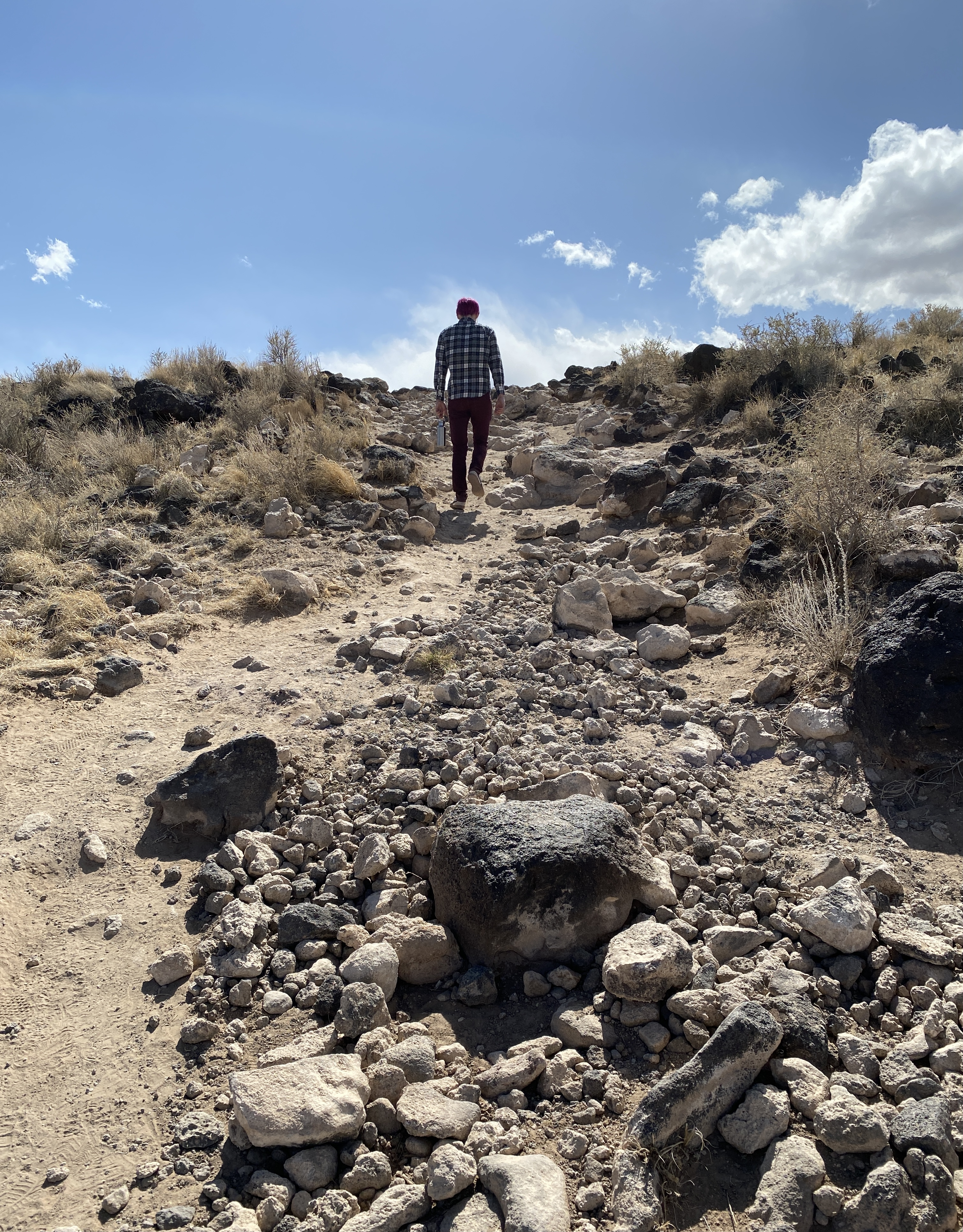
Trail up to the top of Black Volcano in Petroglyph National Monument

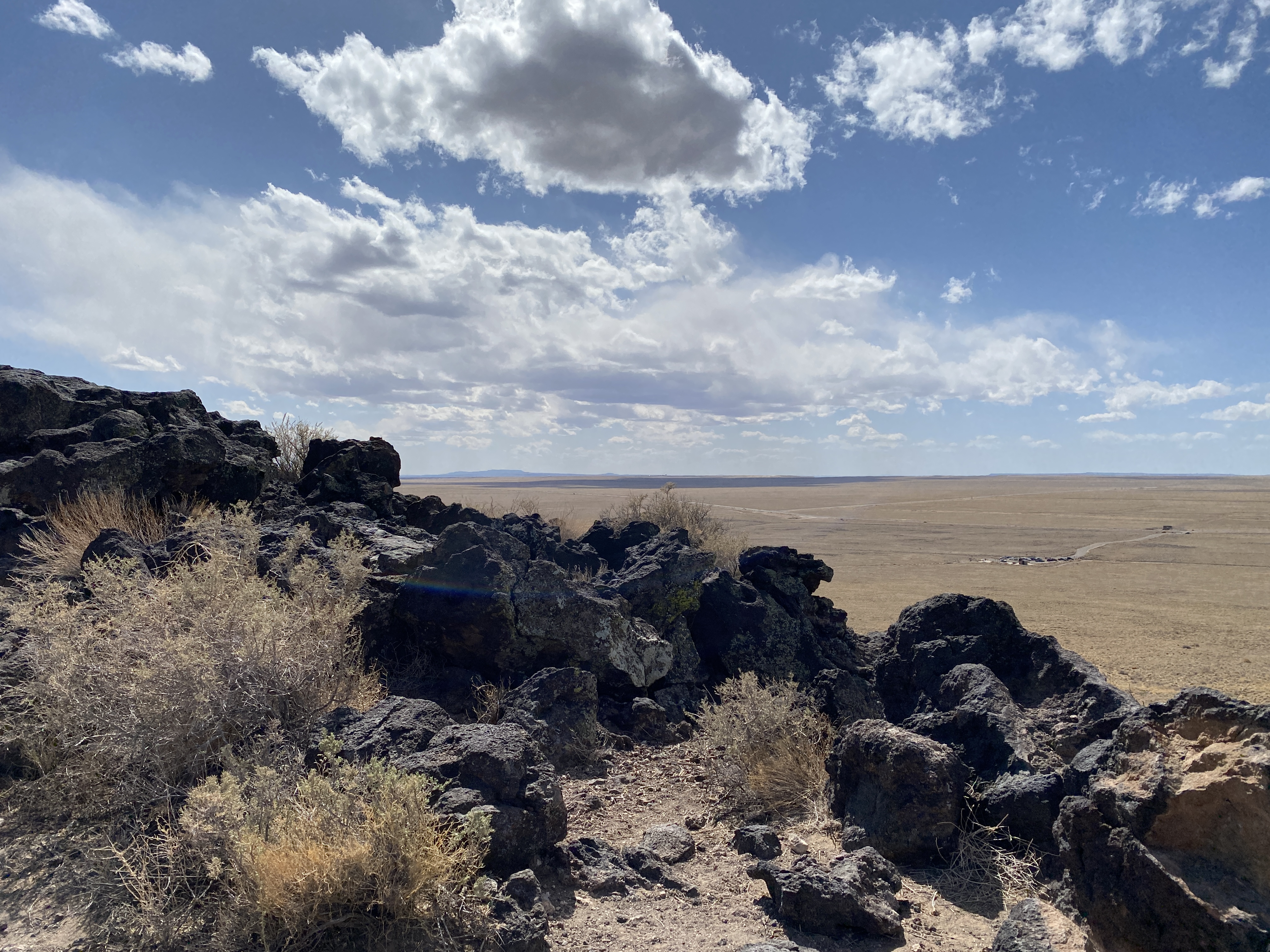
Rocks at the top of Black Volcano
