= Petroglyph National Monument =

United States National Monument and archeological site in New Mexico

- IUCN category III (natural monument or feature)
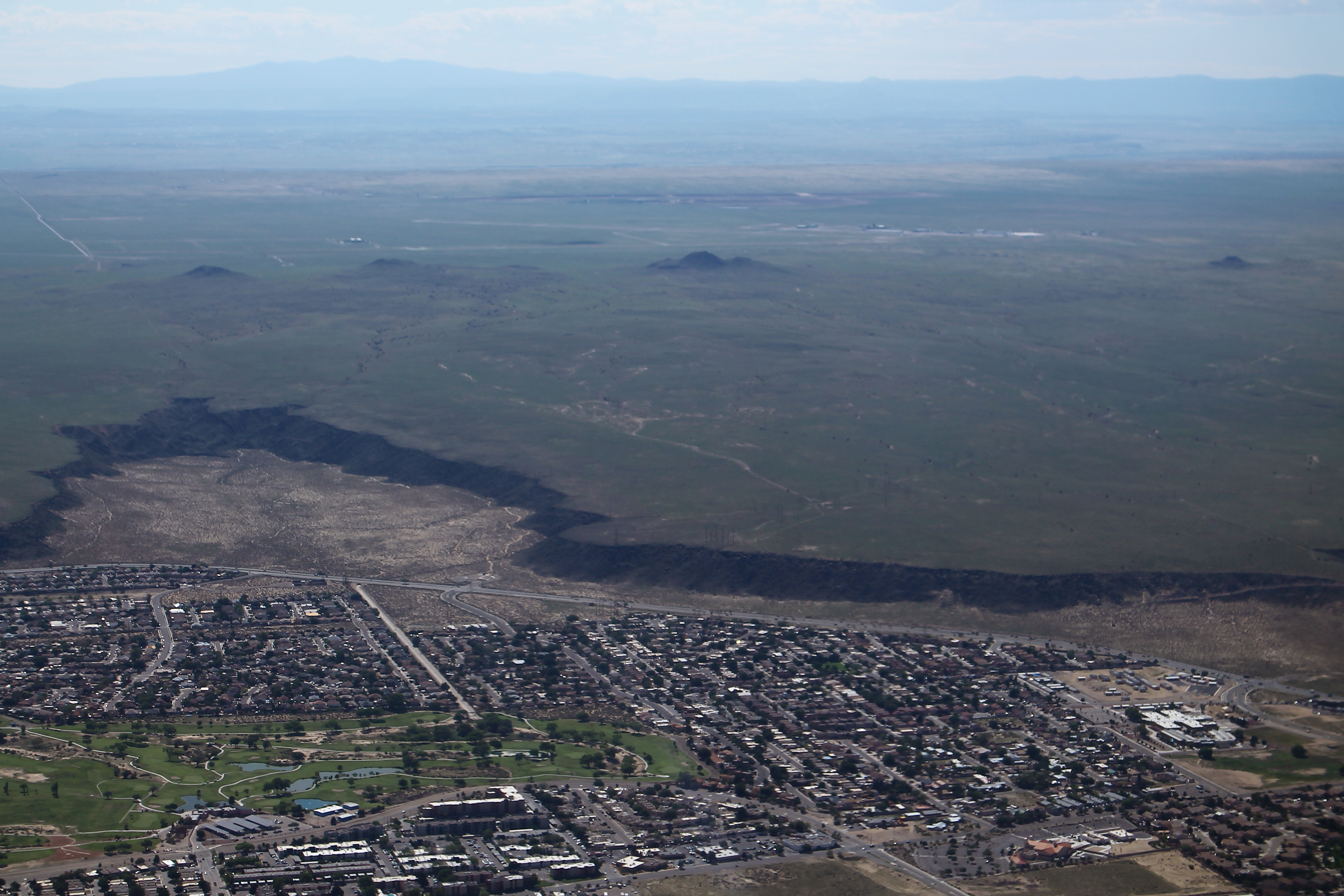
- Aerial photo of the Petroglyph National Monument

- Location within New Mexico Location within the United States
- Interactive map of Petroglyph National Monument
- Location: Bernalillo County, New Mexico, US
- Nearest city: Albuquerque, NM
- Coordinates: 35°8′9″N 106°45′43″W
- Area: 7,532 acres (30.48 km^{2})
- Authorized: June 27, 1990
- Visitors: 310,672 (in 2025)
- Governing body: National Park Service
- Website: Petroglyph National Monument

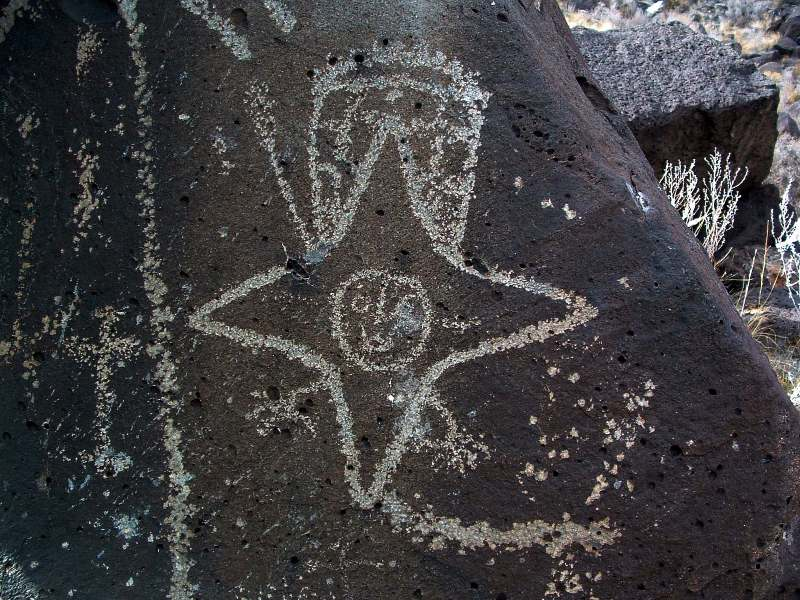
A petroglyph in the Rinconada section of PNM

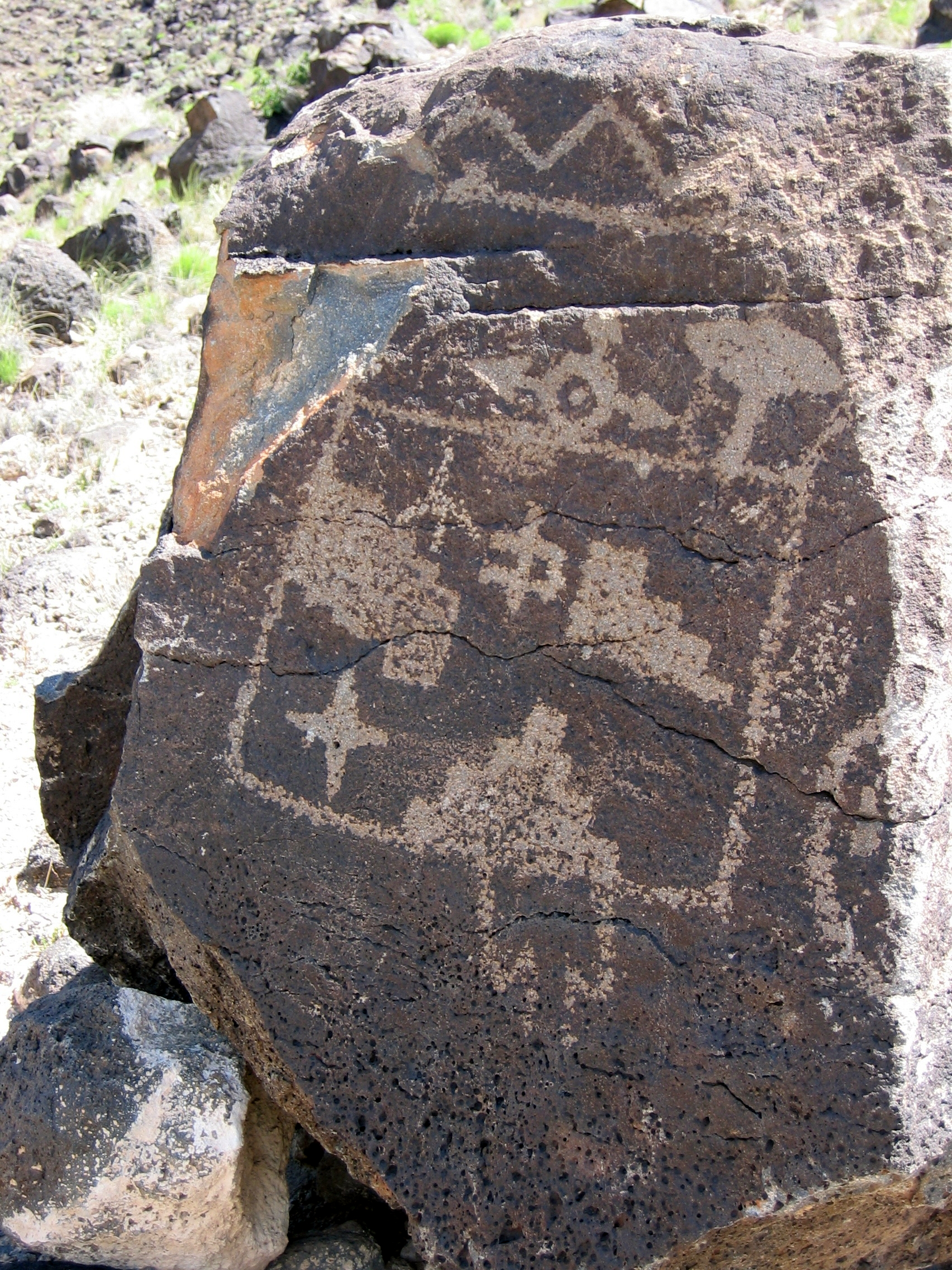
Petroglyphs on a large rock at Petroglyph National Monument

Petroglyph National Monument stretches 17 miles (27 km) along Albuquerque, New Mexico's West Mesa, a volcanic basalt escarpment that dominates the city's western horizon. Authorized June 27, 1990, the 7,236 acres (2,928 ha) monument is cooperatively managed by the National Park Service and the City of Albuquerque. The western boundary of the monument features a chain of dormant fissure volcanoes. Beginning in the northwest corner, Butte volcano is followed to its south by Bond, Vulcan, Black and JA volcanoes.

Petroglyph National Monument protects a variety of cultural and natural resources including five volcanic cones, hundreds of archeological sites and an estimated 24,000 petroglyph images carved by Ancestral Pueblo peoples and early Spanish settlers. Many of the images are recognizable as animals, people, brands and crosses; others are more complex. Their meaning was, possibly, understood only by the carver. These images are the cultural heritage of a people who have long since moved into other areas and moved on through history for many reasons. The monument is intended as a protection for these lands and sites for visitors to see and appreciate for generations to come. The national monument is managed in a manner that allows recreational use. The monument has four major sites that visitors can access, Boca Negra Canyon, Rinconada Canyon, Piedras Marcadas Canyon, and the Volcano Day Use trails.

== Geologic history ==
Approximately 200,000 years ago, six volcanic eruptions created a 17-mile-long (27 km) cliff containing thick basalt layers of rock and cooled lava. When the volcanoes erupted, molten lava ranging in depth from 5 to 50 ft (1.5 to 15.2 m) flowed downhill using old waterways, called arroyos, which eventually formed triangular, peninsula-shaped channels that flowed around hills. The hills have long since eroded over time, while the stronger basalt rocks remained, which eventually cracked and formed canyons and escarpments. As time progressed, more eruptions occurred and thicker lava cooled to form the now-extinct volcanic cones to the west of the monument; these cones can be seen from the top of the mesa. This unique formation of the landscape is called reverse topography.

The basalt rocks' geologic nature allows for the creation of the petroglyphs, or rock carvings, on their surface. The rocks contain high concentrations of iron, manganese and calcium; this combination creates rocks of a gray-like color. However, over thousands of years of exposure to the desert's rough environment, a "desert varnish" forms on the surface. The varnish is formed from the oxidation, or rusting, of the manganese and iron when mixed with oxygen in the air and water from rain; this varnish is dark, almost-black and glossy in appearance. Long ago, Native Americans, as well as Spanish settlers discovered that images can be created on the faces of the rocks by chipping away at this layer using rocks and other tools.

== Cultural history and significance ==
The petroglyph images within the monument hold deep cultural significance to Pueblo peoples and neighboring Native peoples. This rock art has complex and varied meanings.

Archaeologists have dated some carvings, primarily those in the Boca Negra Canyon area, as far back as 3,000 years ago. The relative age is determined based on the darkness of the image, its context, and its comparison to other works of the same age. It is estimated that about 90 percent of the petroglyphs were created during the period between AD 1300 and the end of the 17th century because of the "Southwestern Style" used. At this time, the Native population was increasing quickly and Pueblo adobe villages were being built along the Rio Grande and at the base of the Sandia Mountains.

== Stupa controversy ==
In 1989, at least a year prior to the National Monument's establishment, a Tibetan Buddhist stupa was built and consecrated on what was then private land owned by Harold Cohen and Ariane Emery. The National Park Service subsequently used eminent domain to seize this land and make it part of the Monument, over the owners' objections. The stupa was not removed, but all buildings on the land were razed.

On June 10, 2010, the Superintendent of Petroglyph National Monument sent an email stating that "[w]hile soils are being stockpiled nearby for the future construction of an amphitheater, the National Park Service has no plans for the Stupa." The Monument website was also updated to describe the construction projects and clarify that the Stupa was not to be demolished.

However, in September 2012, the National Park Service (NPS) removed the stupa from Petroglyph National Monument. This action followed a review prompted by concerns over the constitutionality of maintaining a religious structure on federal land. The Department of the Interior's solicitor general determined that retaining the stupa violated the Establishment Clause of the U.S. Constitution. Consequently, the NPS arranged for the stupa to be deconsecrated by a Tibetan lama and relocated it to a site selected by the local Buddhist community approximately 15 miles away.

== Other controversies ==
Suburban development currently affects the Petroglyph National Monument site. The city of Albuquerque succeeded with its plans to build a 4 lane highway directly through the site itself. Although there was legal pushback from several groups such as the SAGE Council, a Native-founded citizens' group, the Sierra Club, and the National Trust for Historic Preservation, the project was ultimately completed by relocating nine petroglyphs. The issue was featured in the documentary, Reclaiming Their Voice: The Native American Vote in New Mexico & Beyond.

Documents posted on June 6, 2012, by Public Employees for Environmental Responsibility (PEER) alleged that although the Petroglyph National Monument was a valuable resource and location for the City of Albuquerque and the State of New Mexico, the historical resources contained within it were in danger because of the inability of the City and the National Park Service (NPS) to manage up the land that was under the City's control. In their opinion, no persistent standards or patrols protected the petroglyphs or the surrounding areas.

Under a five-year Cooperative Management Agreement, the National Park Service and the City specified the delegation of their respective responsibilities for the monument. The City, however, refused to allow NPS rangers to patrol or enforce Park Service rules on City lands, which constitute the bulk of the monument. Due to City service cutbacks, most of the Petroglyph is ultimately left unpatrolled. In a July 25, 2011 letter to PEER, NPS Intermountain Regional Director John Wessels stated–

However, the NPS currently has no agreement with the City of Albuquerque that holistically authorizes NPS to enforce the entirety of 36 CFR Part 2 on lands owned by the city ... We would welcome such an agreement and we have, in the past, proposed such an agreement with the City, but the City has not acceded to this proposal.

Southwest PEER Director Daniel Patterson said, "It is a disgrace that ancient rock art is obscured by both years of debris and last weekend's vandalism ... Petroglyph is not just a regional but a national treasure which deserves the same protections as other national parks."

PEER launched a citizen petition and national campaign to persuade Albuquerque Mayor Richard J. Berry to allow NPS to provide full monument protection in the upcoming cooperative management pact. However, the Cooperative Management Agreement was renewed and as of 2025, the National Monument is still currently under the jurisdiction of both the City and the NPS.

== Gallery of petroglyphs at Petroglyph National Monument ==
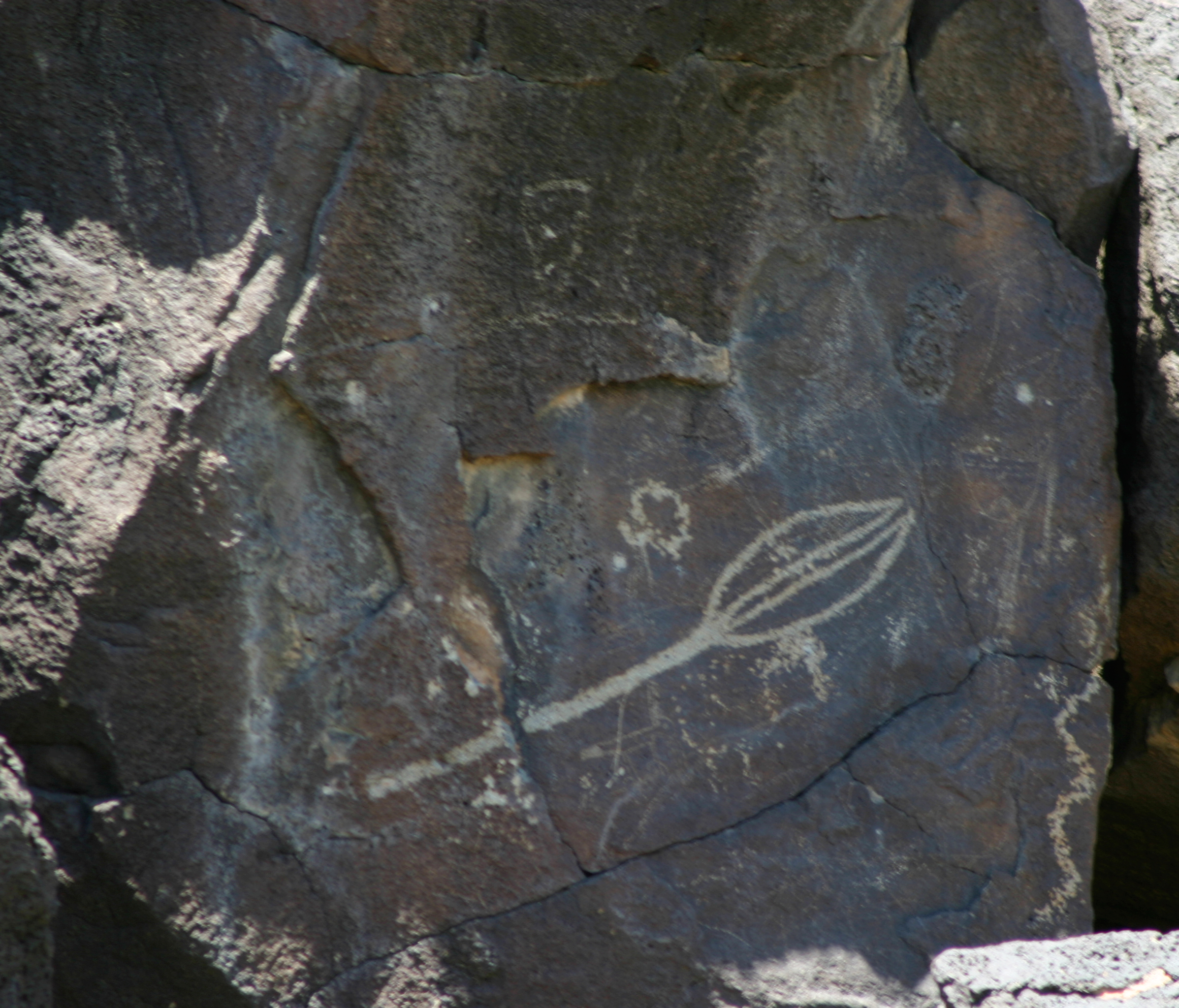

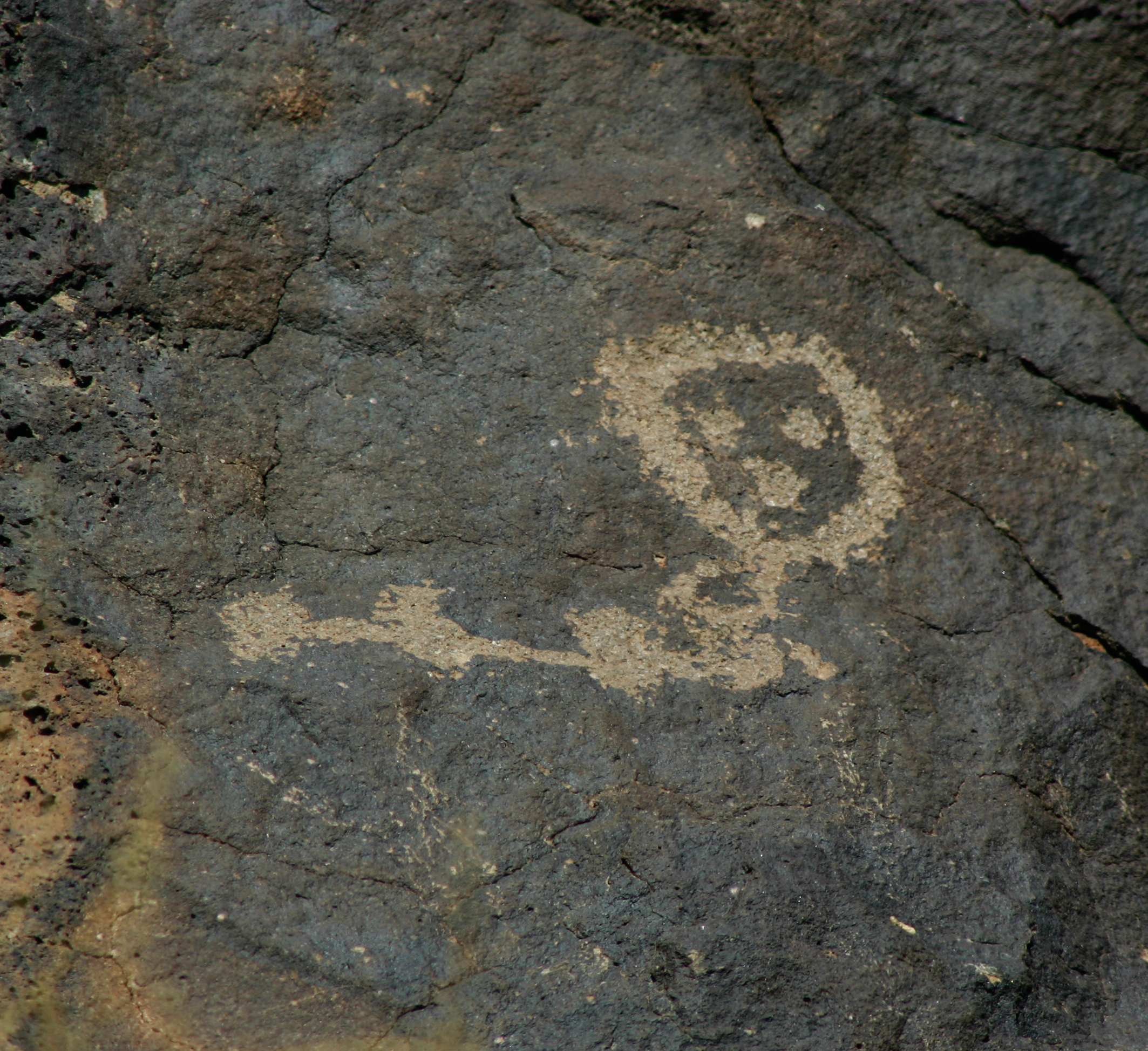

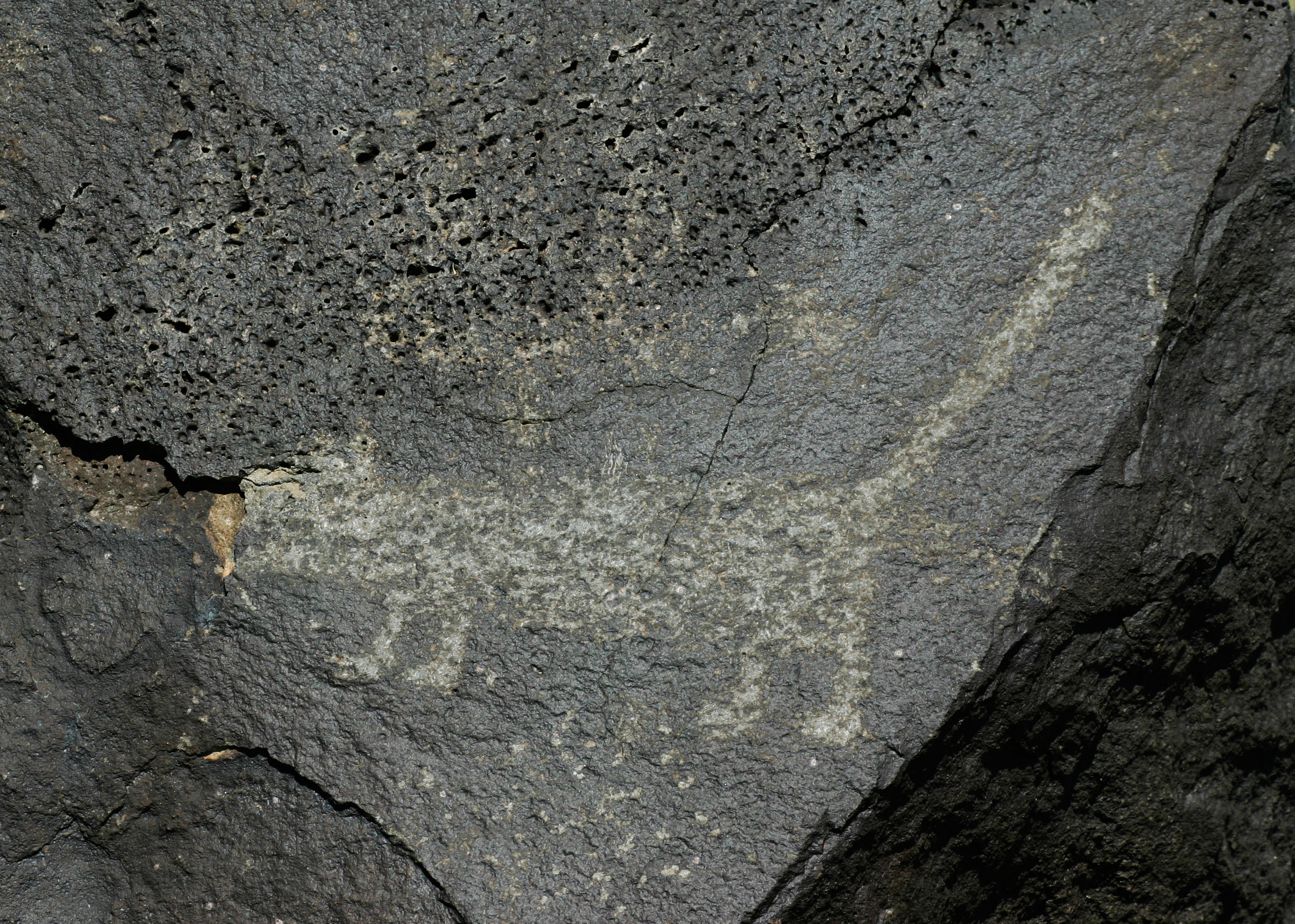

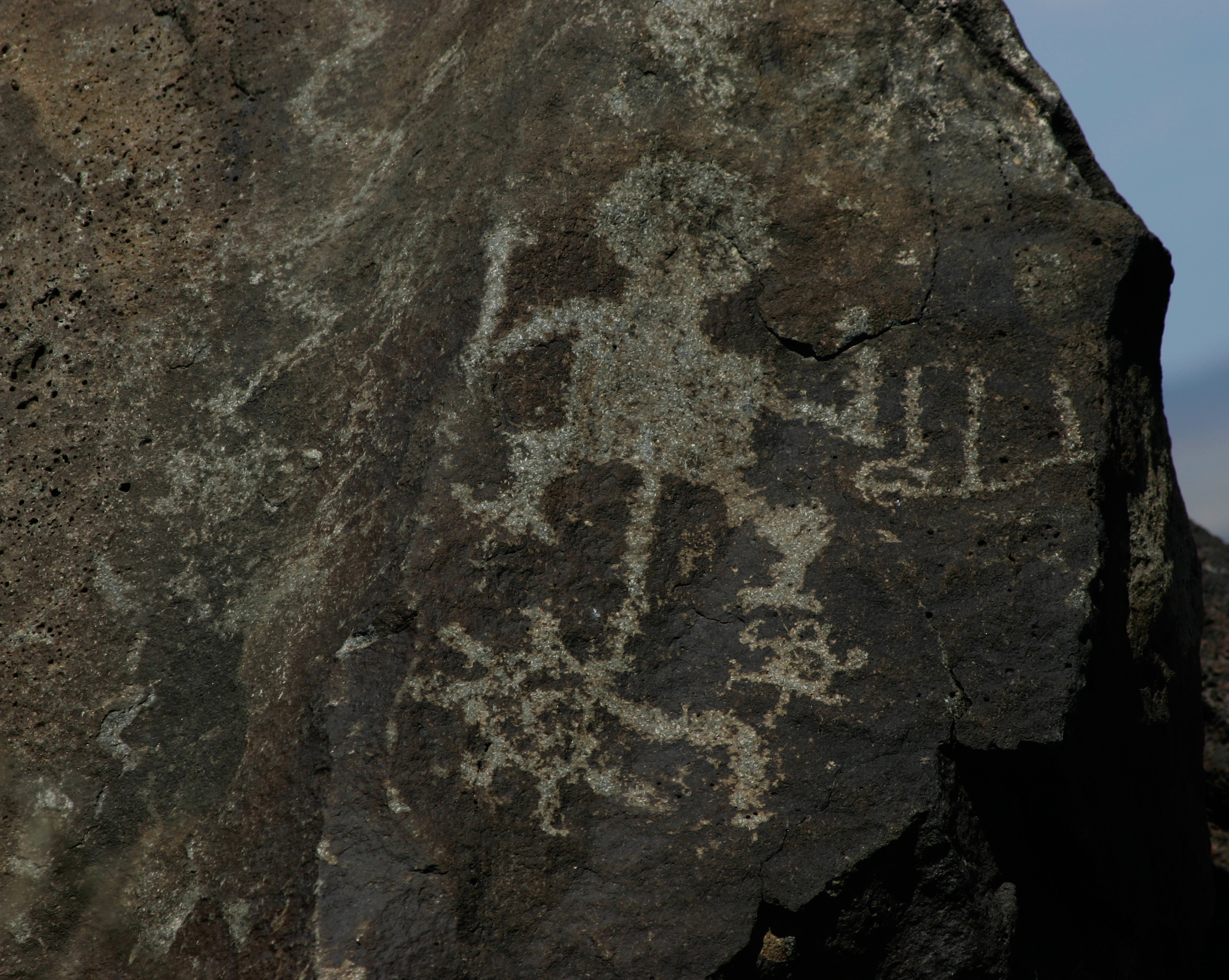

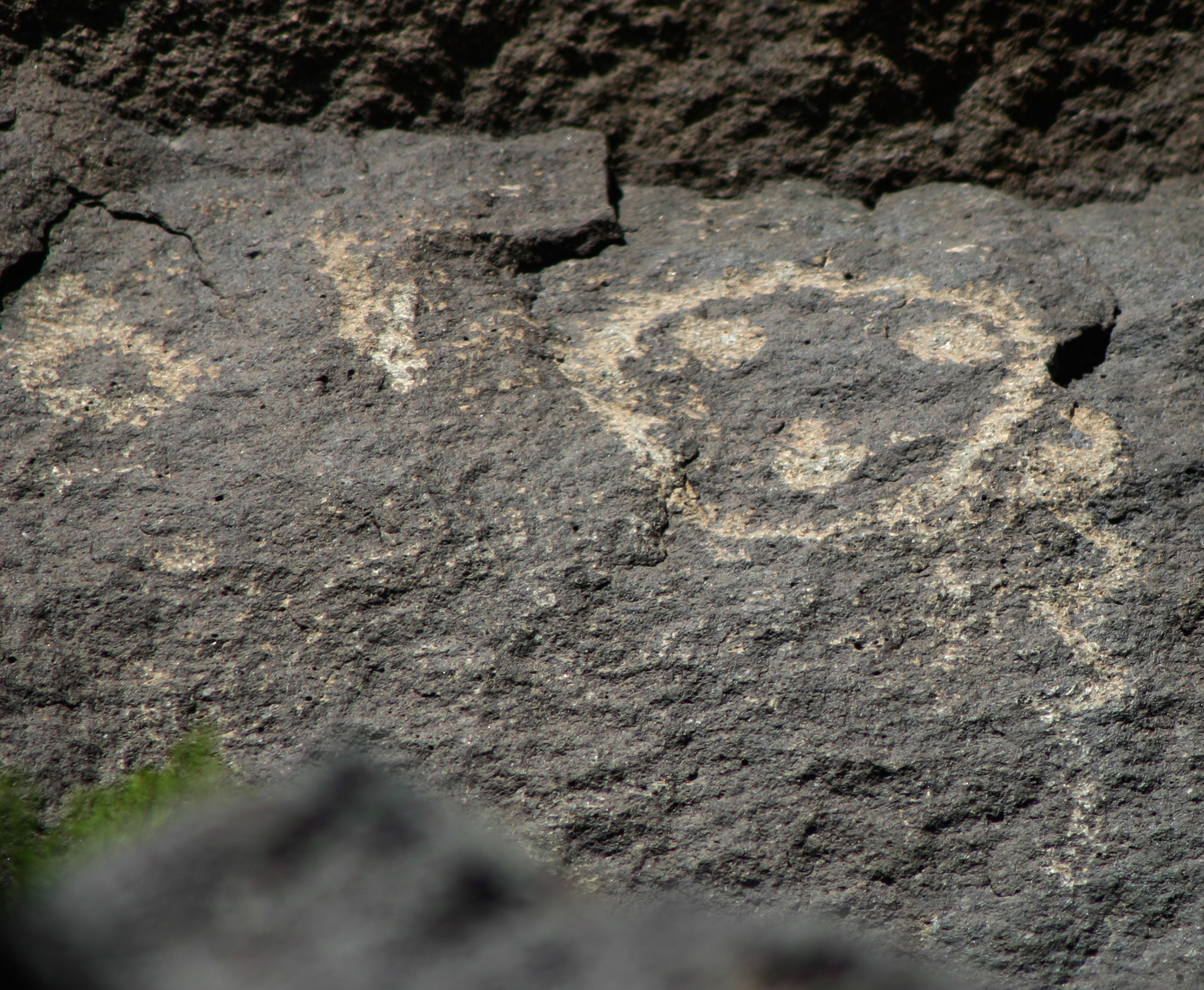

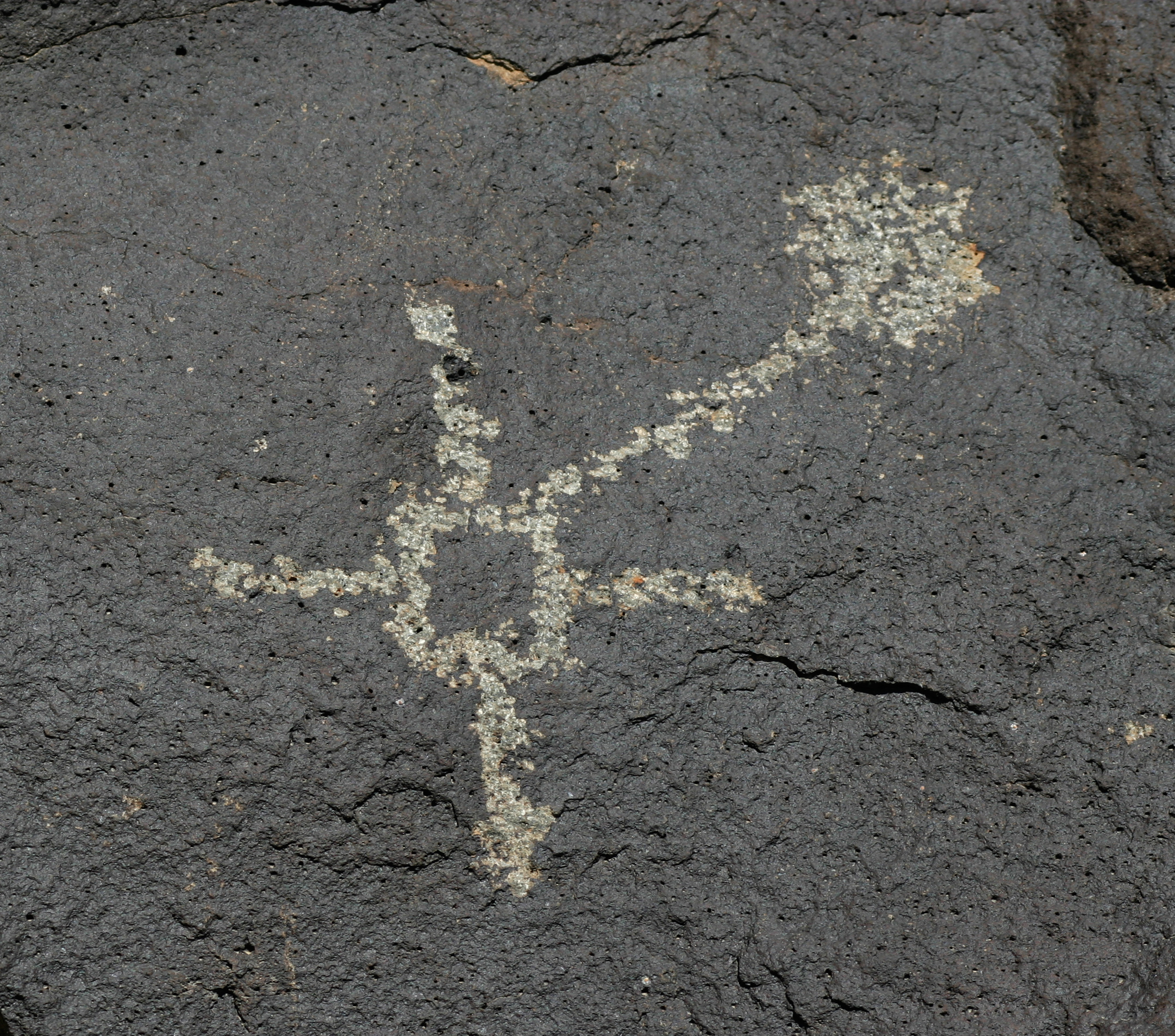

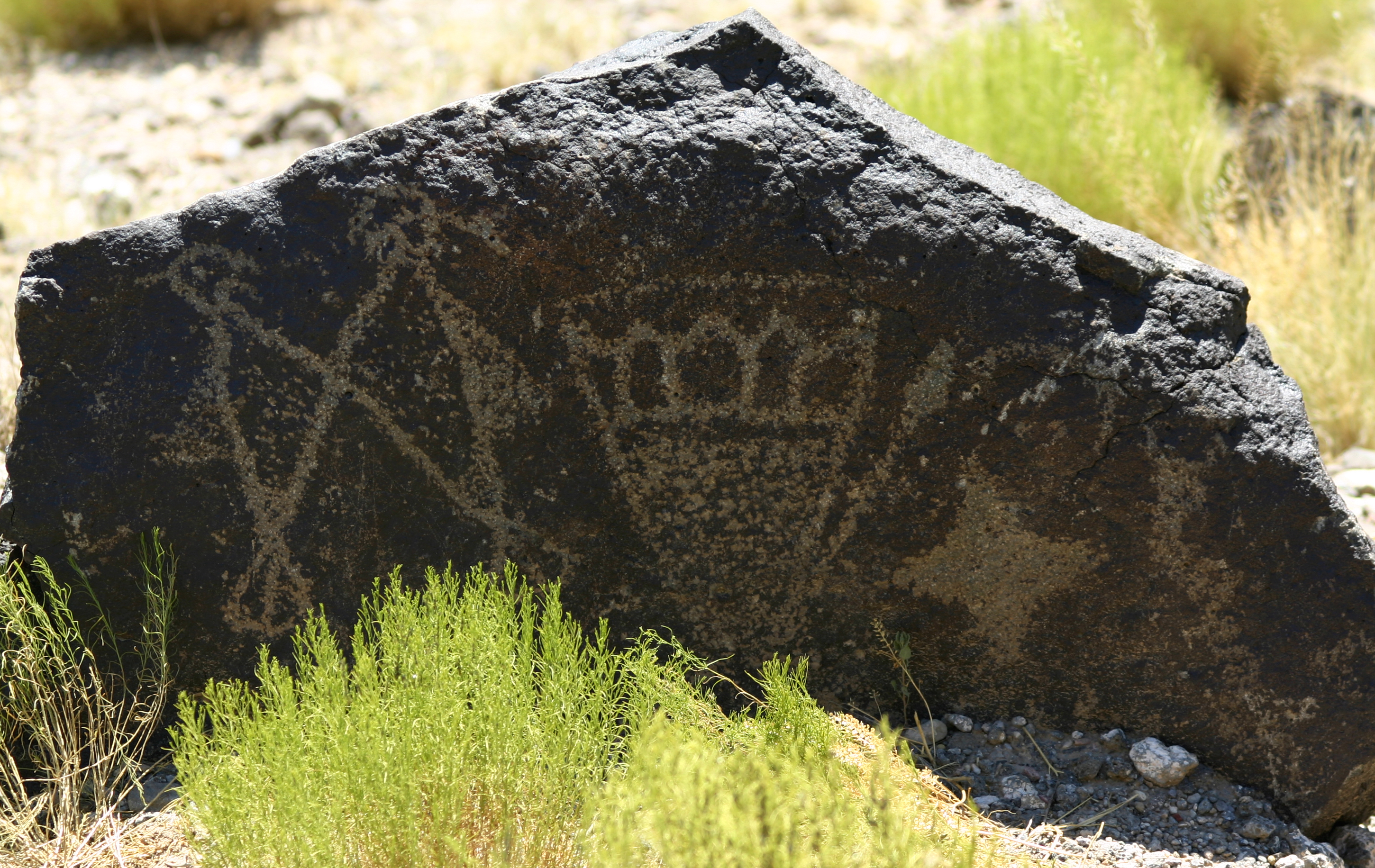

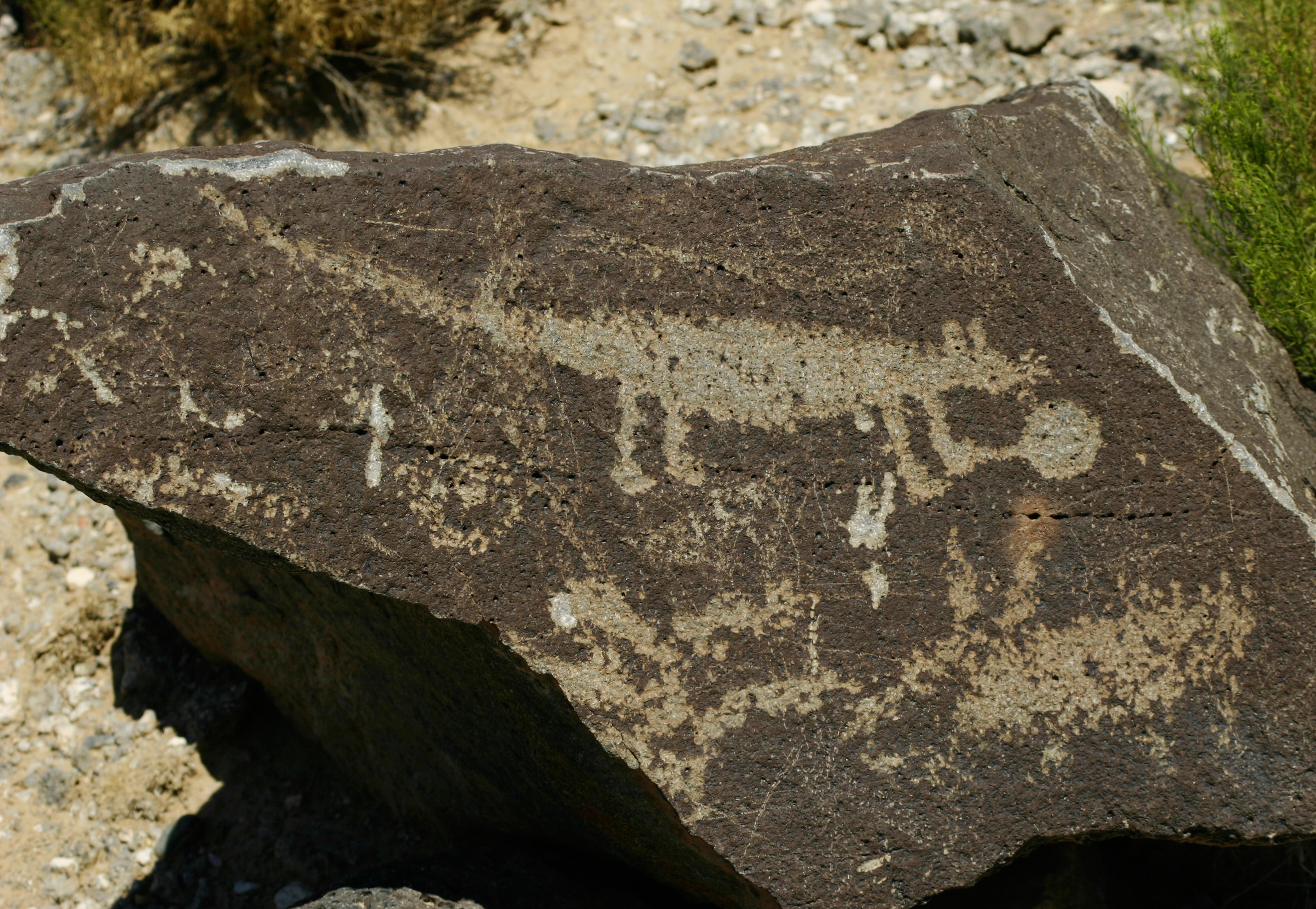

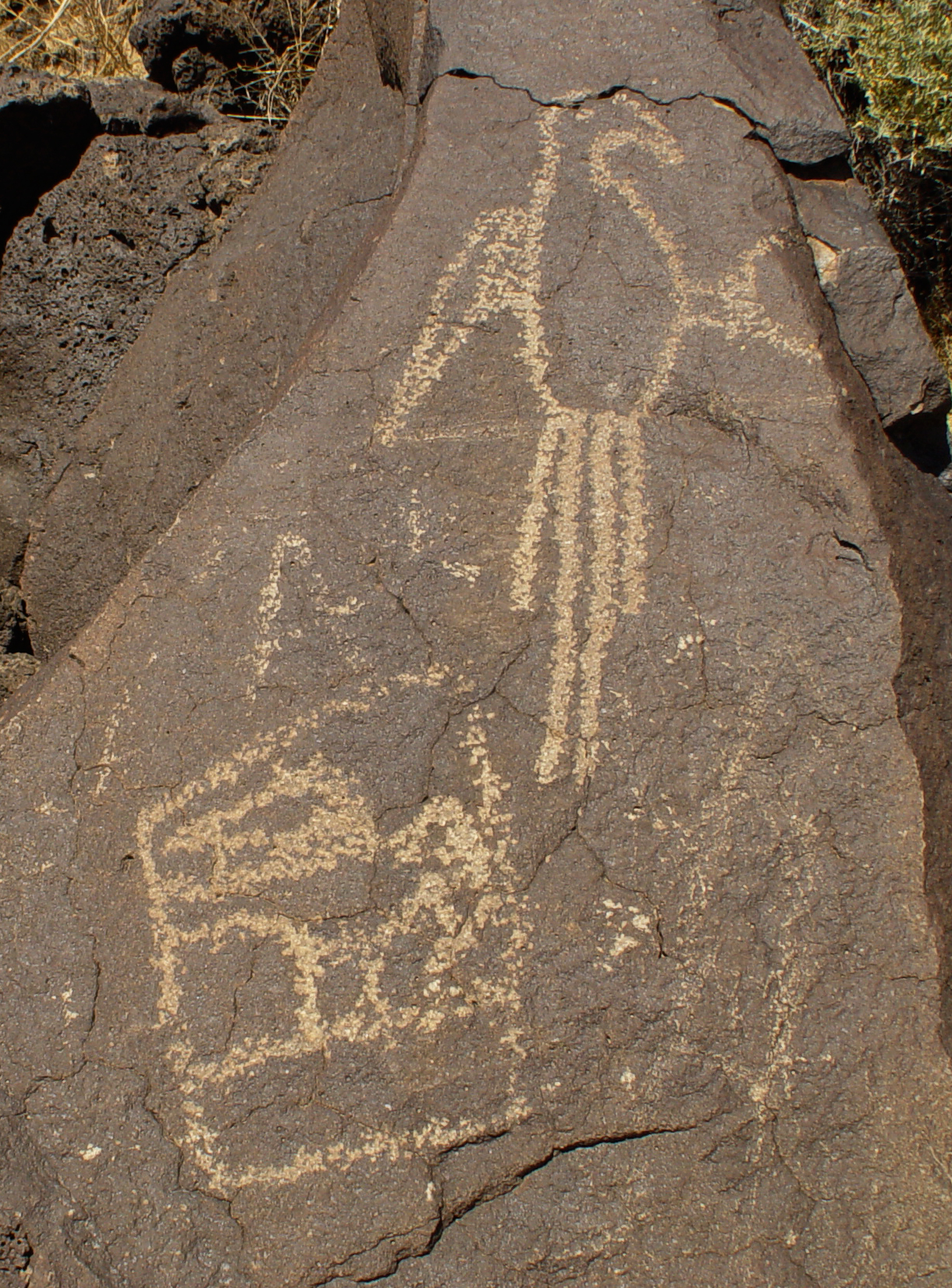

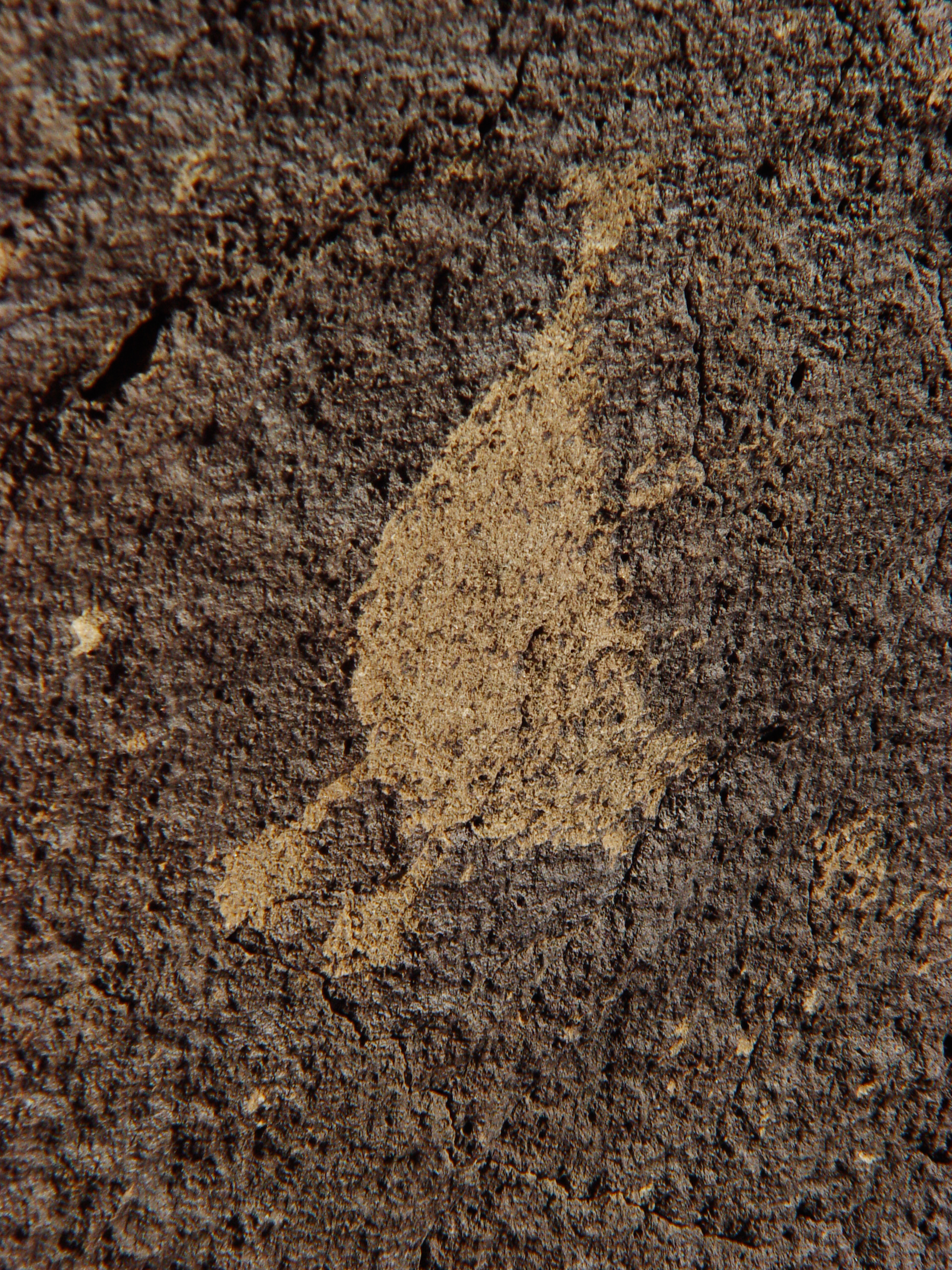

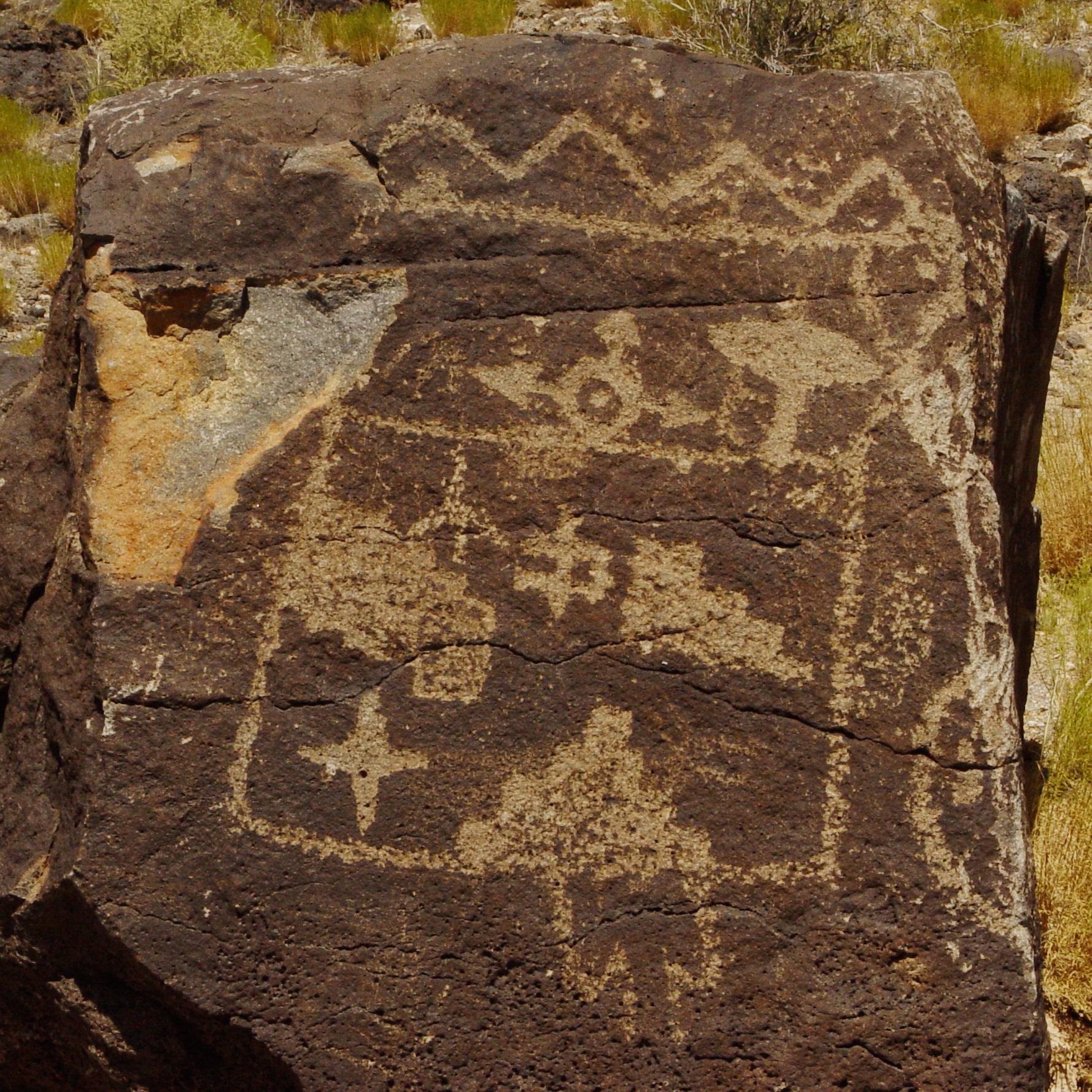

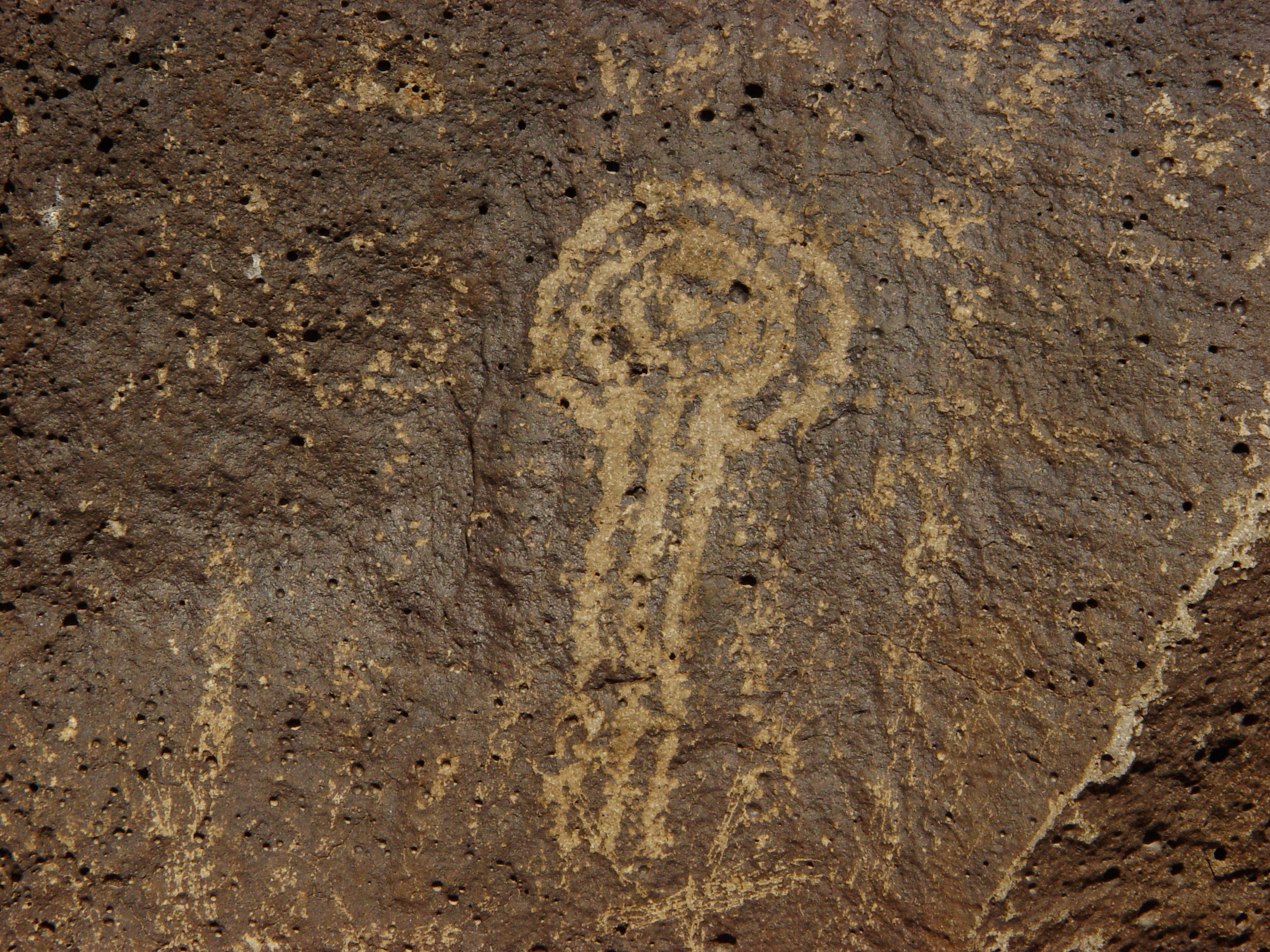

== Gallery of volcanoes in Petroglyph National Monument ==
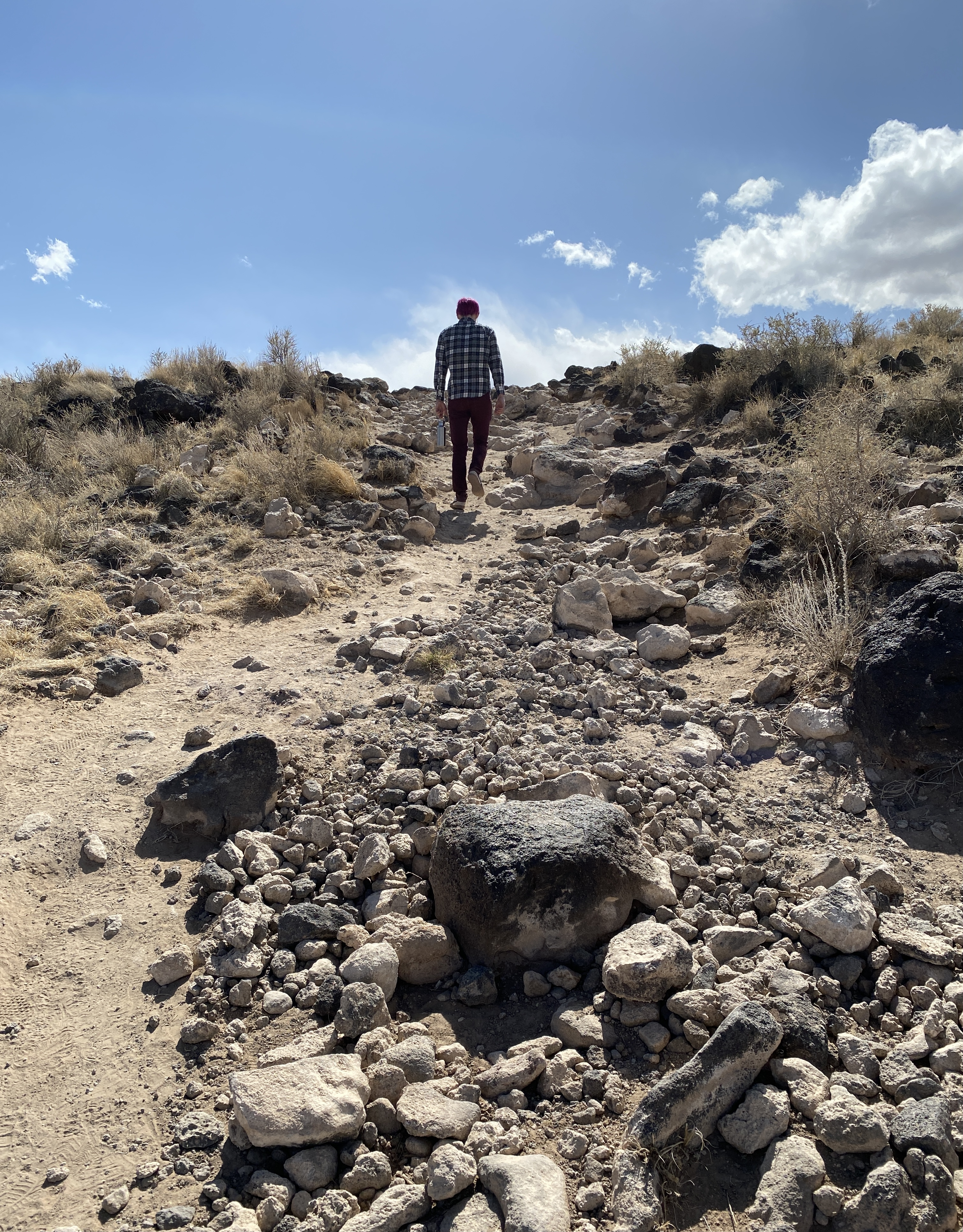
Trail up to top of Black Volcano

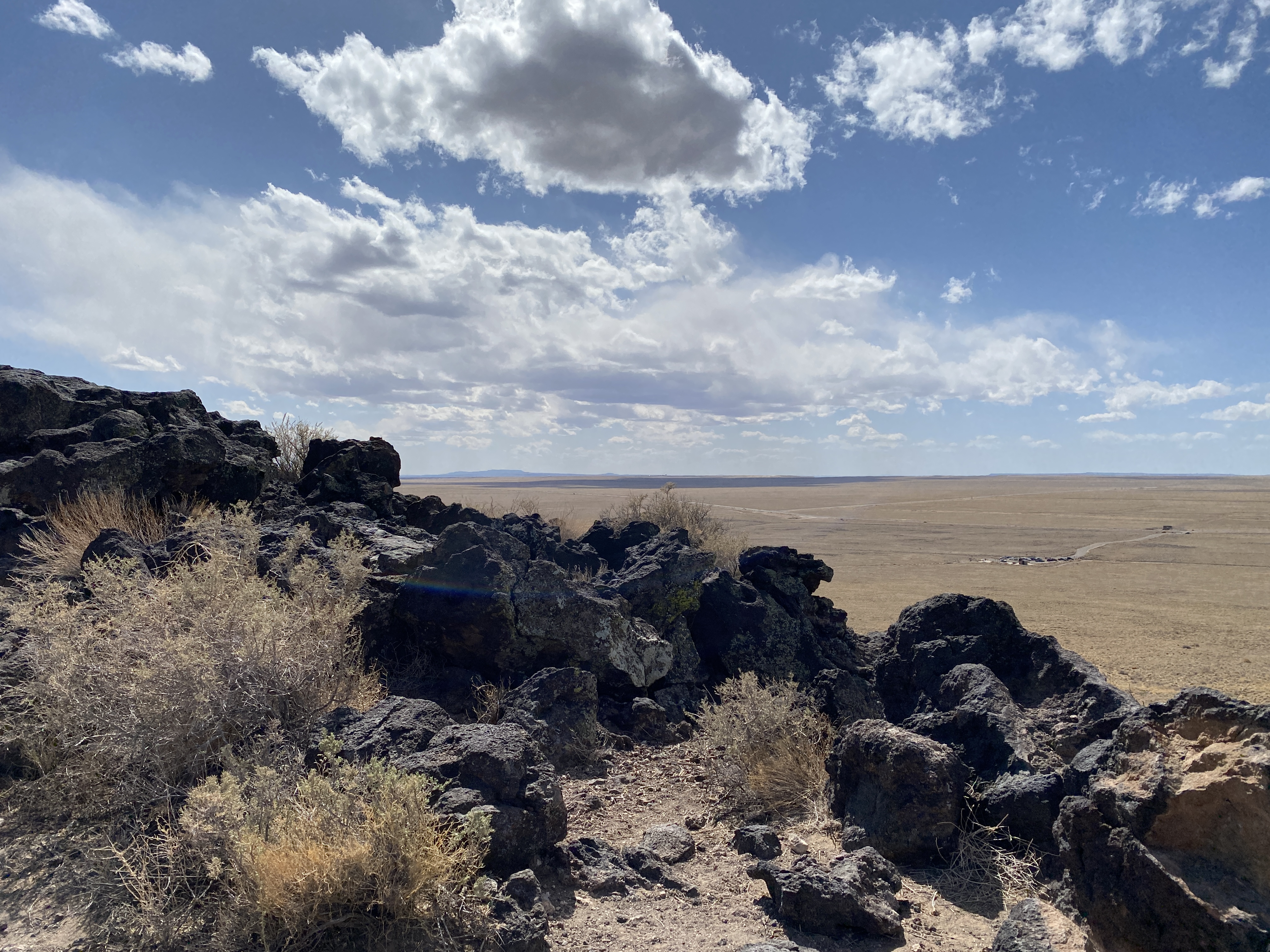
Rocks at the top of Black Volcano

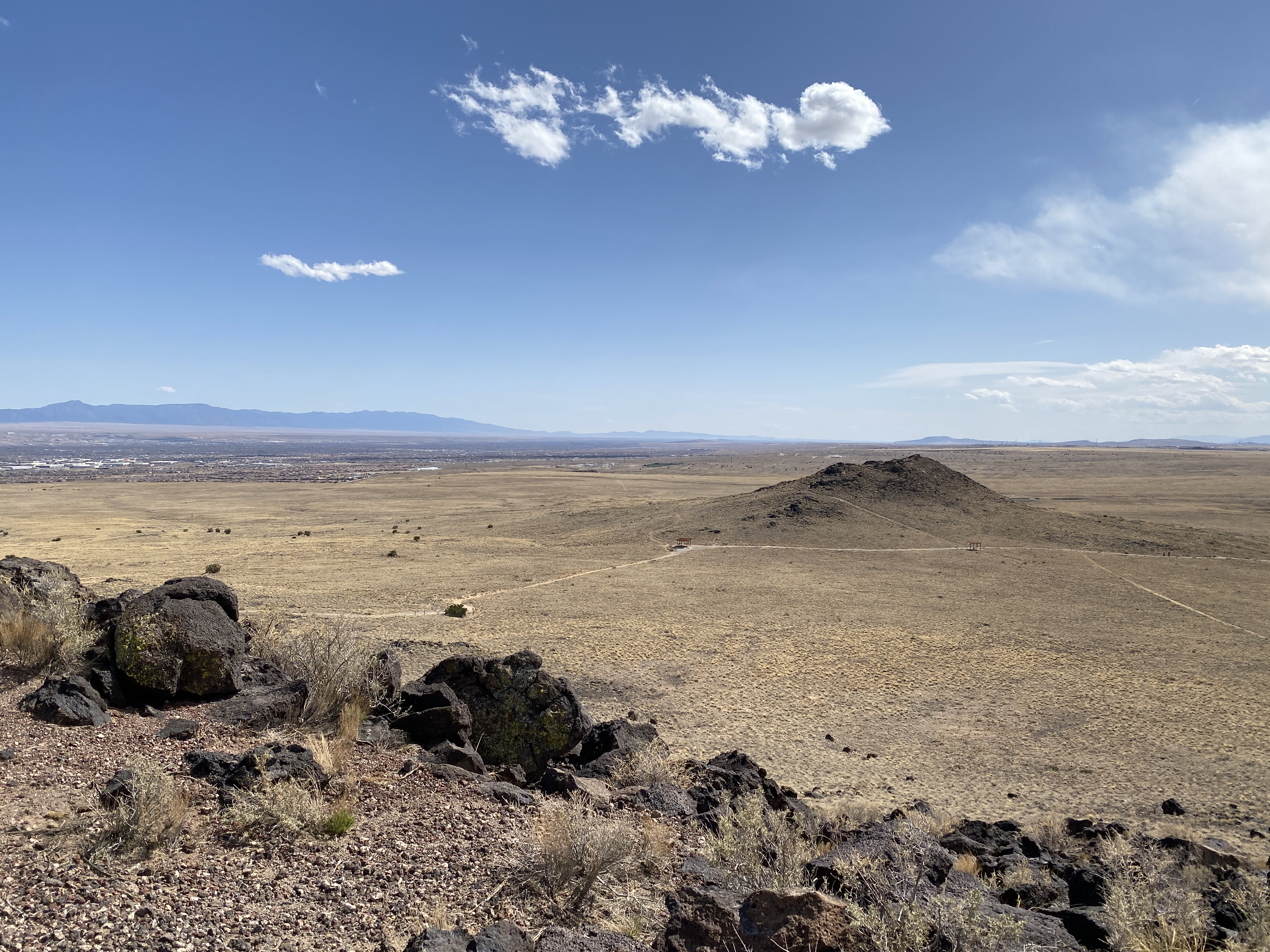
Looking toward JA Volcano

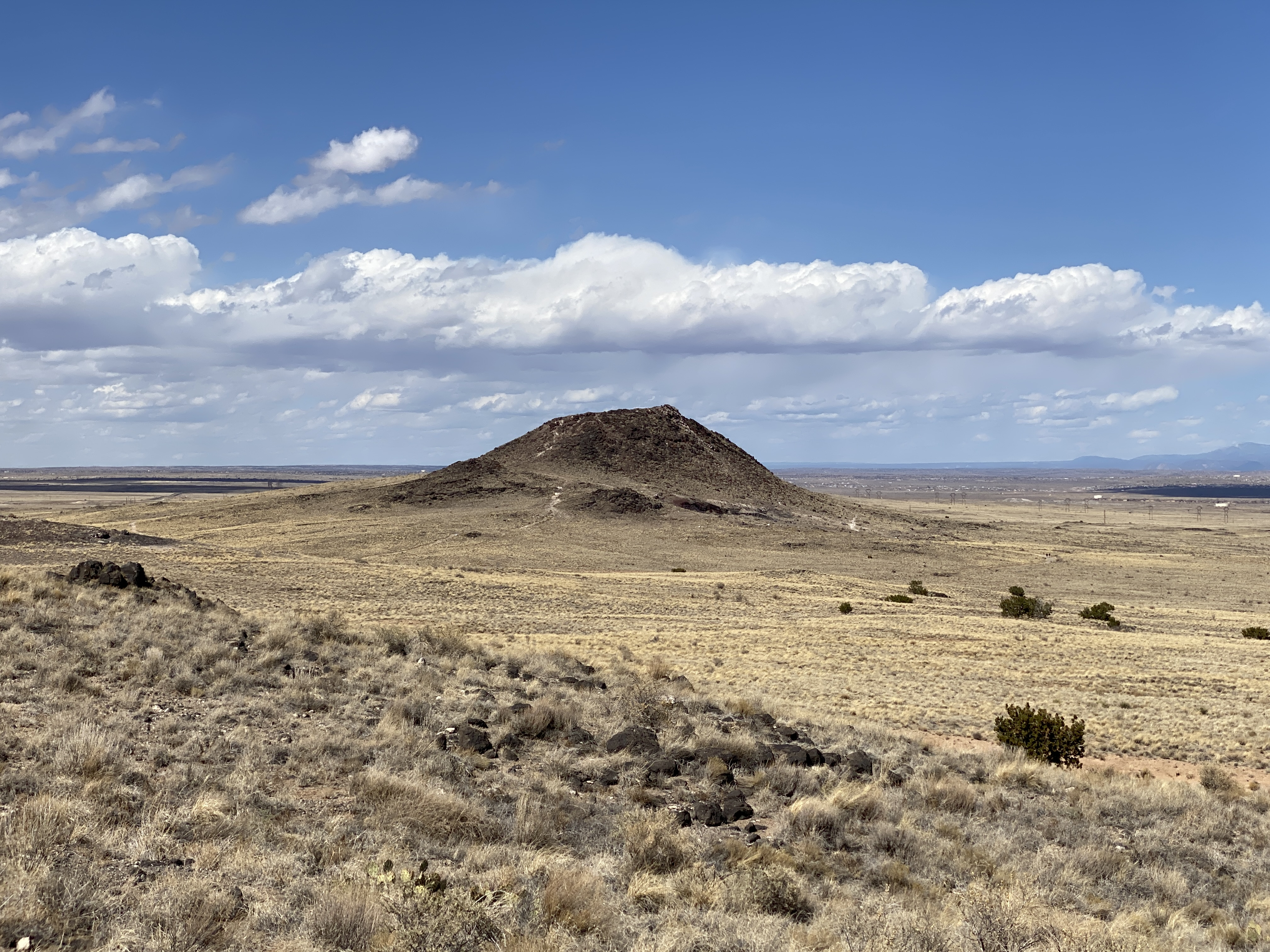
Looking toward Vulcan Volcano while on the volcanoes trail

External videos
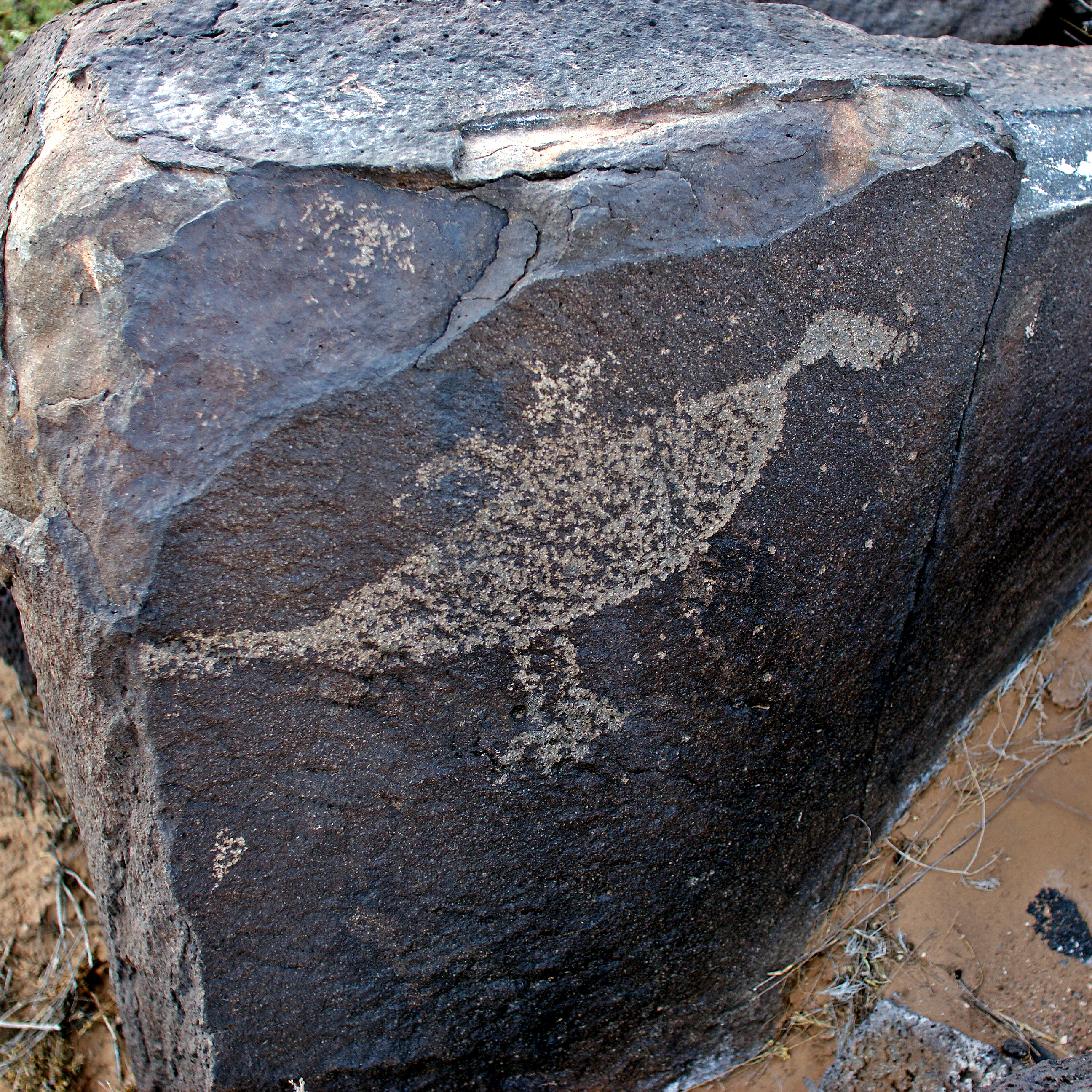
- Petroglyph National Monument (7:47), C‑SPAN

== See also ==
- List of national monuments of the United States
- List of petroglyph sites
- List of Stone Age art
