= JA volcano =

Volcano in New Mexico, United States

JA Volcano
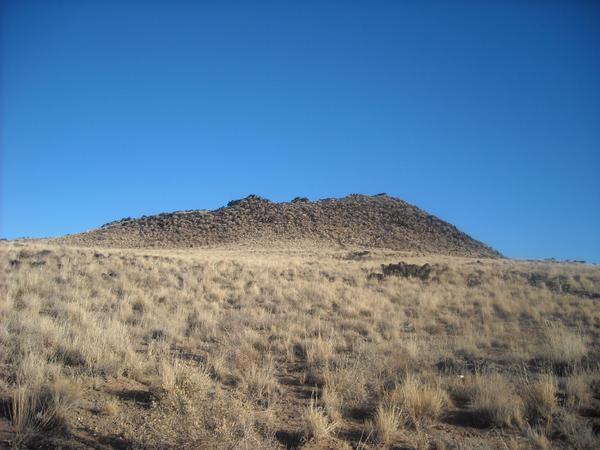
- JA Volcano in Petroglyph National Monument, as seen from its western flank on January 14, 2009

Highest point
- Elevation: 5,944 ft (1,812 m)
- Prominence: 114 ft (35 m)
- Coordinates: 35.1275°N 106.7728°W

Geography
- Location: Petroglyph National Monument, Bernalillo County, New Mexico, US

Geology
- Rock age: > 10,000 years
- Mountain type: Spatter cone
- Last eruption: 150,000+ years ago

JA Volcano is an inactive volcano located near Albuquerque, New Mexico. JA Volcano is the southernmost of 5 volcanoes in a 5-mile chain within the western boundary of Petroglyph National Monument.

The volcano has been the site of repeated pranks:

"Volcano "Erupts" But Fools No One—a 1950 newspaper headline declared. Nobody was fooled, apparently, because the same prank—piling tires on the side of a volcano and setting them on fire to simulate an eruption—had been tried in 1947 with much greater success (even causing a panic in the city). For years students from nearby St Joseph would paint a "J" on Vulcan Volcano, when the light is right it can still be seen." St. Joseph College was later named the University of Albuquerque. In 1950 the College of St. Joseph began its move into a newly built campus on the palisades along the Rio Grande below the volcano. The name was changed to the College of St. Joseph on the Rio Grande. In 1966, the institution changed its name again to the University of Albuquerque. Twenty years later, it closed its doors and became the campus of St. Pius X High School.

The volcano is composed of a type of volcanic rock called olivine tholeiitic basalt. Radiometric dating indicates an age for this rock of about 156,000 years. The volcano consists of two flows with a spatter cone at the center. Late in the eruption, subterranean pressure bulged the surface beneath the cone, causing radial cracking that resulted in emplacement of dikes around the cone. A final explosion blew out the eastern rim of the cone.

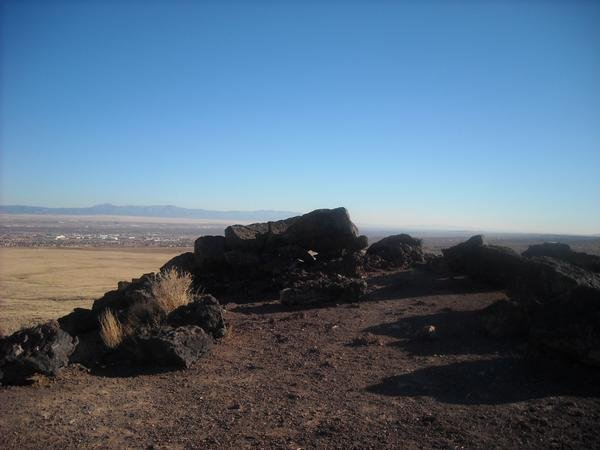
JA Volcano, about 2/3 of the way up its north-to-south trail to the summit. Albuquerque is in the distance in this view facing east/southeast
