= List of United States Army Bands =

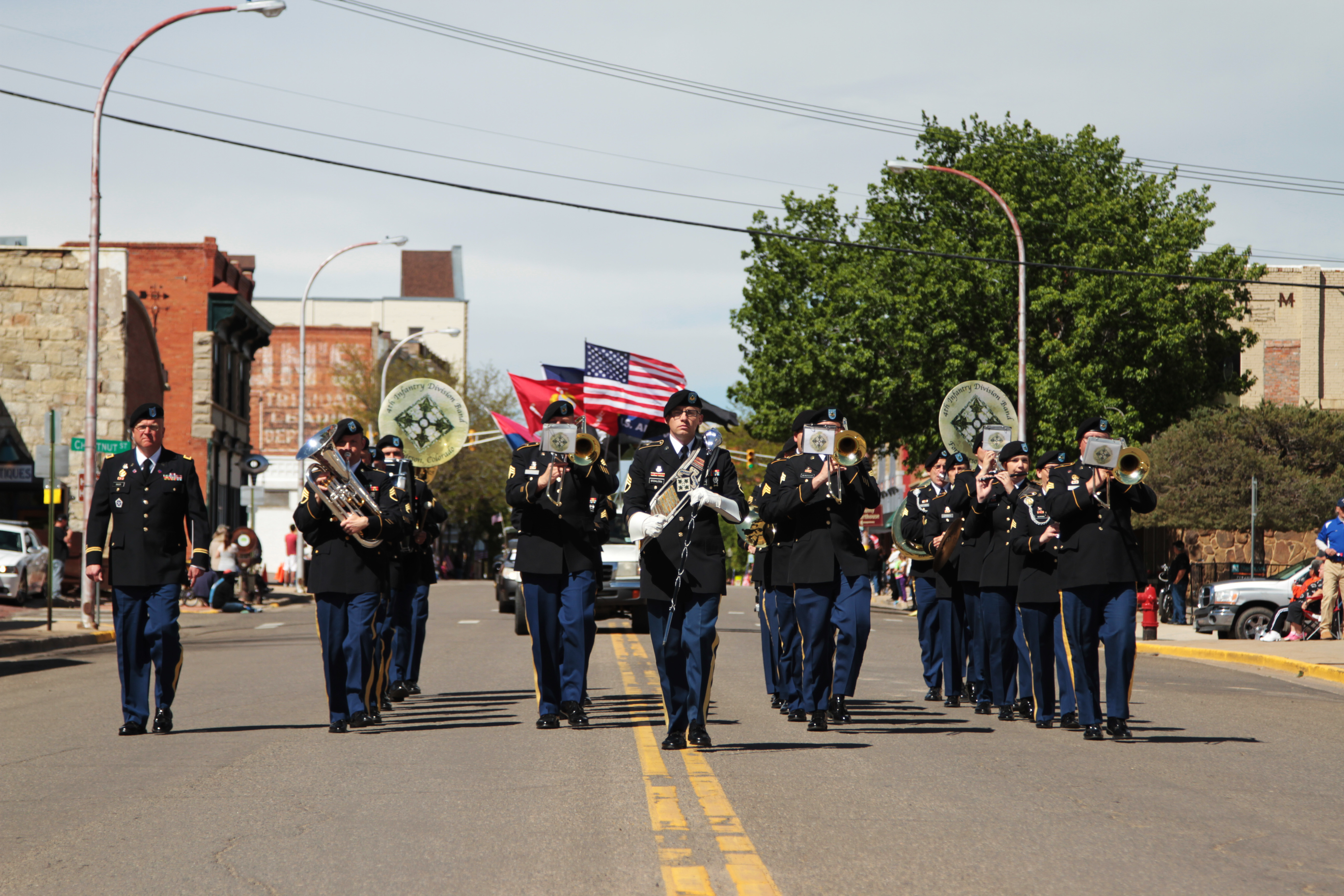
The 4th Infantry Division Band during the 5th annual Trinidad Armed Forces Day parade.

The United States Army has maintained multiple military bands in its over two centuries of service. These bands provide musical support for military camps and bases, military areas, and communities across the mainland United States and other territories such as Puerto Rico. United States military bands also serve in army units outside the country and in regions such as Western Europe or Eastern Asia. There are currently 87 army bands, which consists of 15 active duty regional bands, 13 reserve bands, 51 National Guard bands, and four premier bands. Many bandsmen are trained as part of Band of the Army School of Music at Virginia Beach before their assignment in these bands.

== Premier ensembles ==
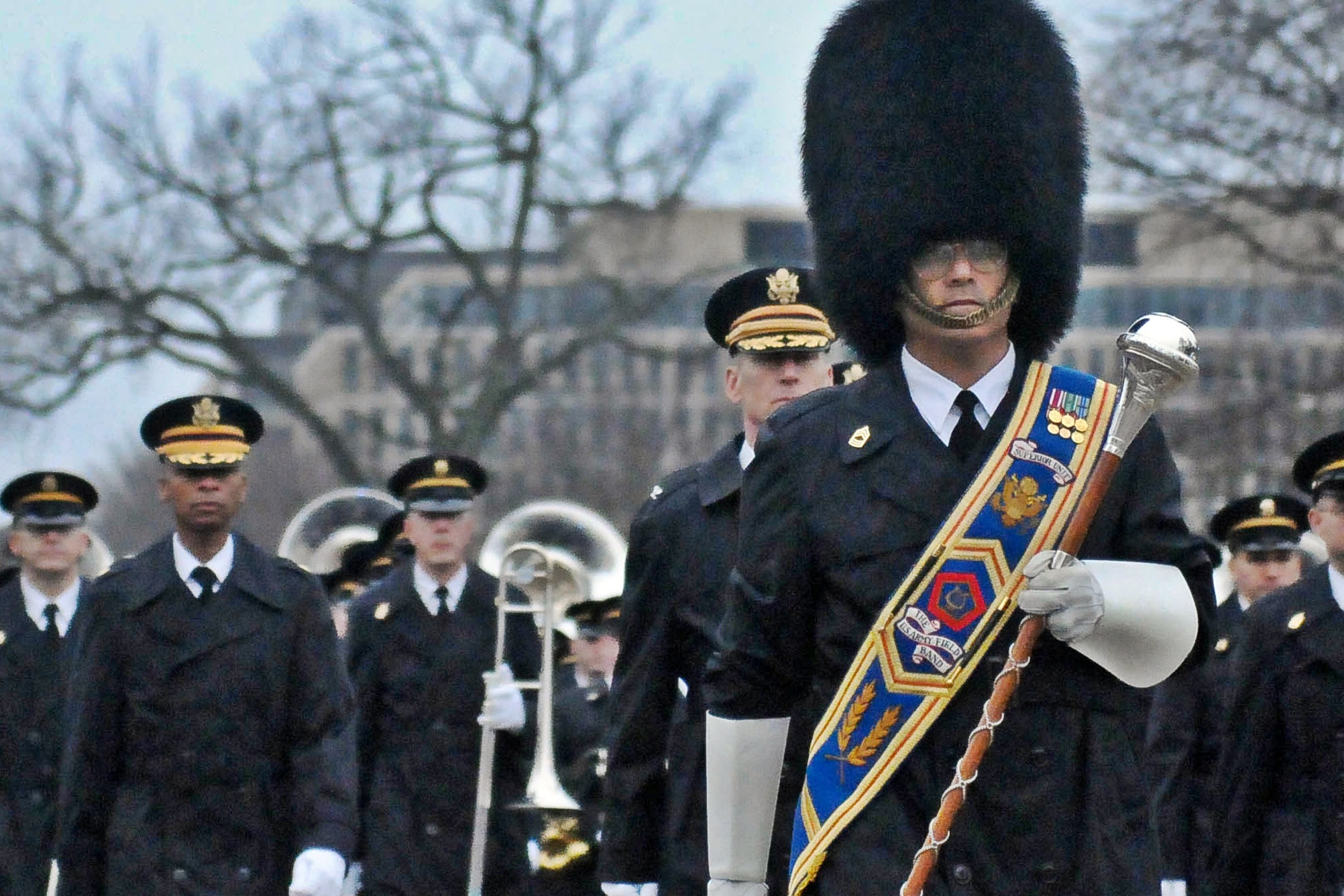
The Army Field Band in early 2013.

Ensemble	Activated	Garrison
U.S. Army Band	1922	Joint Base Myer–Henderson Hall is located in the United States
U.S. Army Field Band	1946	Fort Meade is located in the United States
Old Guard Fife and Drum Corps	1960	Joint Base Myer–Henderson Hall is located in the United States
West Point Band	1817	U.S. Military Academy is located in the United States

== List of active regional bands ==
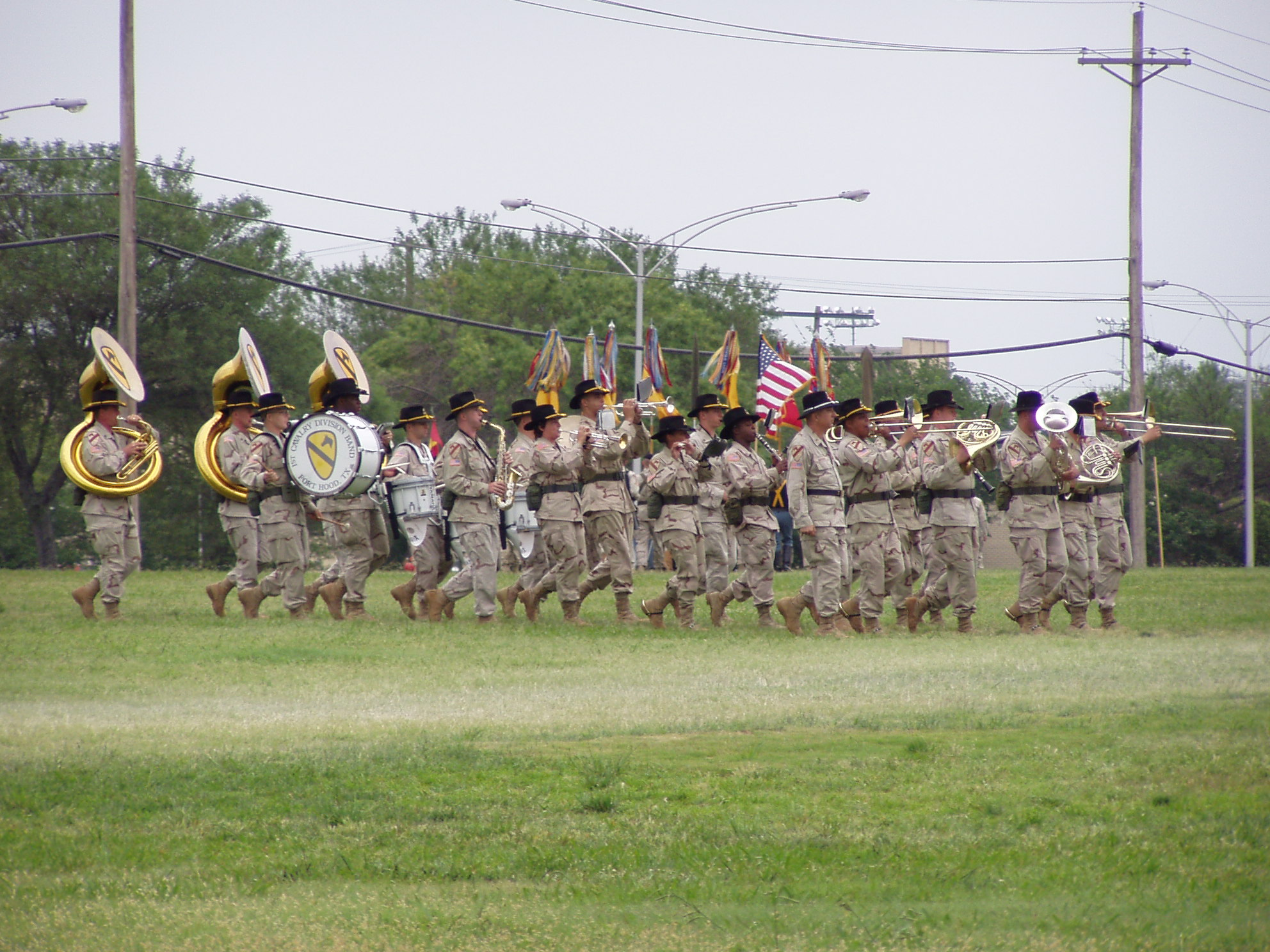
The 1st Cavalry Division Band during a color uncasing ceremony at Knight Field upon return from the Iraq War, 1 May 2005.

Band	Garrison	City
United States Army Europe Band and Chorus	Sembach	Kaiserslautern, Germany
Army Maneuver Center of Excellence Band	Fort Benning	Columbus, GA
1st Armored Division Band	Fort Bliss	El Paso, TX
1st Cavalry Division Band	Fort Cavazos	Killeen, TX
1st Infantry Division Band	Fort Riley	Manhattan, KS
3rd Infantry Division Band	Fort Stewart	Hinesville, GA
4th Infantry Division Band	Fort Carson	Colorado Springs, CO
8th Army Band	Camp Humphreys	Pyeongtaek, South Korea
10th Mountain Division Band	Fort Drum	Watertown, NY
25th Infantry Division Band	Schofield Barracks	Oahu, HI
56th Army Band	Joint Base Lewis McChord	Tacoma, Washington
82nd Airborne Division Band and Chorus	Fort Bragg	Fayetteville, North Carolina
101st Airborne Division Band	Fort Campbell	Clarksville, Tennessee
282nd Army Band	Fort Jackson	Columbia, South Carolina
323rd Army Band	Fort Sam Houston	San Antonio, Texas

== List of Army Reserve bands ==
Band	Garrison	City
78th Army Band	Joint Base McGuire–Dix–Lakehurst	Trenton, New Jersey
100th Army Band	Fort Knox	Kentucky
191st Army Band	Camp Parks	Dublin, California
198th Army Band		Rochester, New York
204th Army Band		Vancouver, Washington/St. Paul, Minnesota
208th Army Band		Concord, North Carolina
300th Army Band		Bell, California
312th Army Band		Lawrence, Kansas
313th Army Band	Redstone Arsenal	Birmingham, Alabama
338th Army Band	Fort McCoy	Whitehall, Ohio/Livonia, Michigan
380th Army Band	Joint Base Langley–Eustis	Richmond, Virginia
395th Army Band		Oklahoma City
484th Army Band		Milwaukee, Wisconsin

== List of Army National Guard bands ==
Band	Garrison	City
13th Army Band	Miramar Armory	Miramar, Florida
23rd Army Band		Lehi, Utah
25th Army Band		Boise, Idaho
28th Infantry Division Band		Hollidaysburg, Pennsylvania
29th Infantry Division Band		Troutville, Virginia
34th Army Band		Fairfield, Iowa
34th Infantry Division Band		Rosemount, Minnesota
35th Infantry Division		Olathe, Kansas
36th Infantry Division		Austin, Texas
38th Infantry Division		Indianapolis, Indiana
39th Army Band		Manchester, New Hampshire
40th Army Band		Colchester, Vermont
40th Infantry Division Band		Los Alamitos, California
41st Army Band		Jackson, Mississippi
42nd Infantry Division Band	Camp Smith (New York)	Cortlandt Manor, New York
43rd Army Band		Lincoln, Nebraska
44th Army Band		Albuquerque, New Mexico
63rd Army Band		Sea Girt, New Jersey
67th Army Band		Wheatland, Wyoming
73rd Army Band		St. Thomas, Virgin Islands
88th Army Band		East Greenwich, Rhode Island
101st Army Band	Buckley Air Force Base	Aurora, Colorado
102nd Army Band		Rockville, Connecticut
106th Army Band		Little Rock, Arkansas
108th Army Band		Phoenix, Arizona
111th Army Band		Pearl City, Hawaii
116th Army Band		Marietta, Georgia
122nd Army Band		Columbus, Ohio
126th Army Band		Wyoming, Michigan
129th Army Band		Nashville, Tennessee
132nd Army Band		Madison, Wisconsin
133rd Army Band		Tacoma, Washington
135th Army Band		Springfield, Missouri
144th Army Band		Chicago, Illinois
145th Army Band		Oklahoma City
147th Army Band		Mitchell, South Dakota
151st Army Band		Montgomery, Alabama
156th Army Band		Bossier City, Louisiana
188th Army Band		Fargo, North Dakota
195th Army Band		Bangor, Maine
202nd Army Band		Frankfort, Kentucky
215th Army Band		Fall River, Massachusetts
229th Army Band		Baltimore
234th Army Band		Clackamas County, Oregon
246th Army Band		Columbia, South Carolina
248th Army Band		San Juan, Puerto Rico
249th Army Band		Morgantown, West Virginia
257th Army Band		Washington, D.C.
287th Army Band		Wilmington, Delaware
440th Army Band		Morrisville, North Carolina
721st Army Band		Barrigada, Guam

== Notable bands that existed in history ==
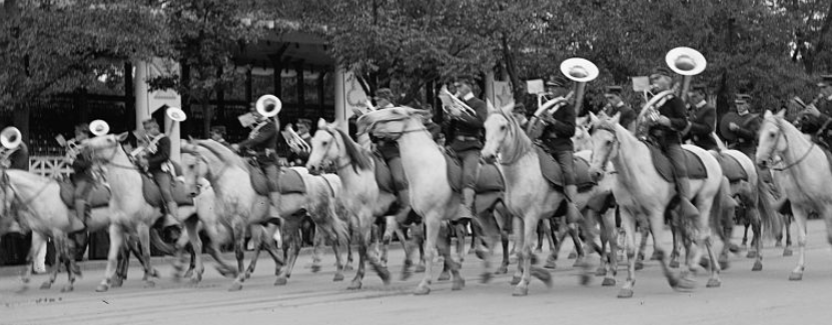
The mounted band of the 2nd U.S. Cavalry leads the parade of the Grand Army of the Republic in 1902.

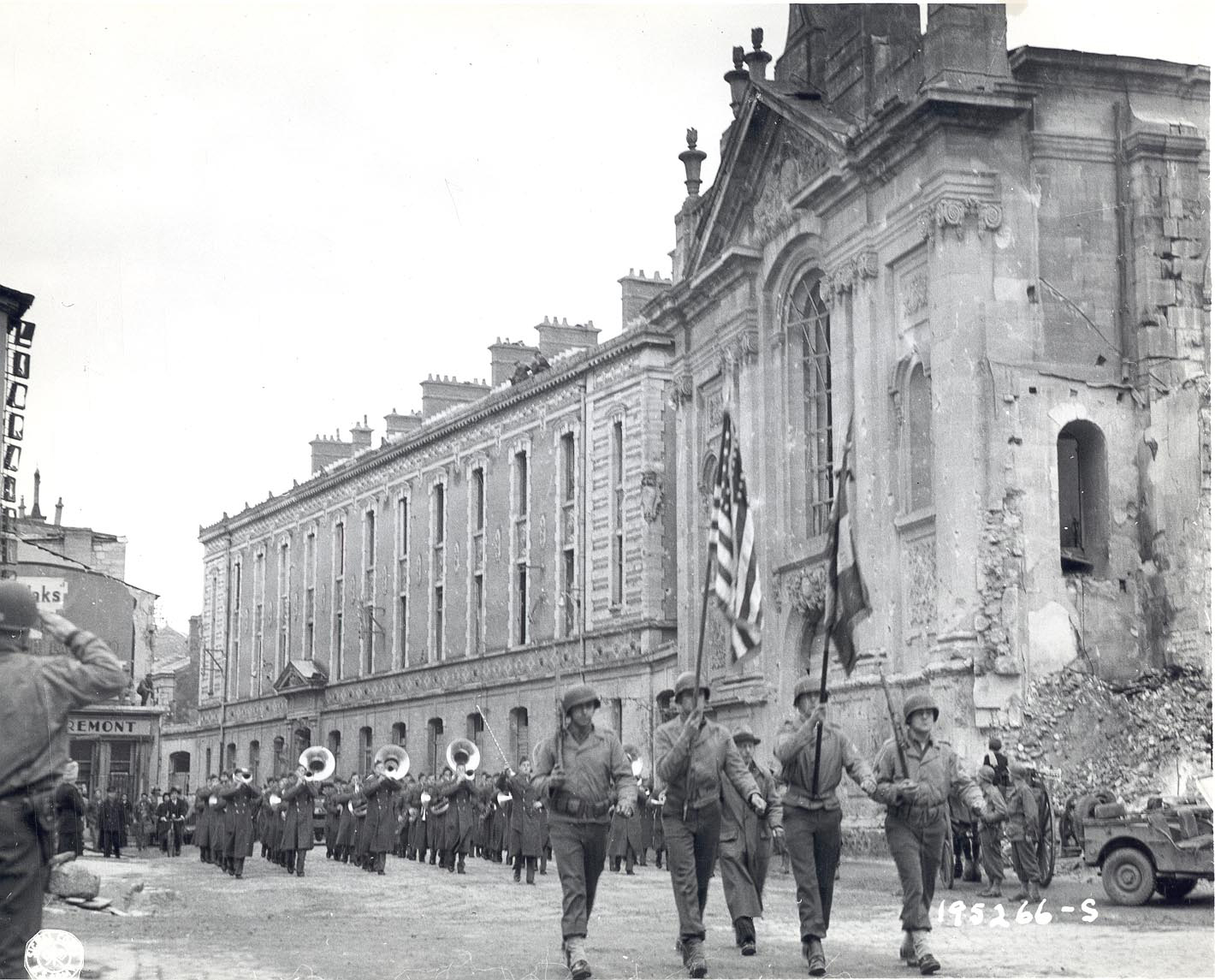
A U.S. Army band leads the entrance of American troops into Verdun, France in 1944.

=== Colored bands ===
During World War I, the mobilization of all African-American bands became common. Among them was the Band of the 369th Infantry Regiment (nicknamed the "Harlem Hellfighters Band") led by James Reese Europe who uniquely utilized black blues and jazz and notably introduced jazz to Europe. The 404th Armed Service Forces Band was the only all-black all-female band in military history. Other colored bands include the Band of the 107th Colored Infantry and the Band of the 805th Pioneer Infantry.

=== Women's bands ===
The first all-women military band, the Women's Army Band, was organized at Fort Des Moines in 1942 by Sergeant Mary Belle Nissly. By early 1943, the Women's Army Auxiliary Corps (WAAC) had been at a capacity to where it could sport five bands:

- 400th Army Band
- 401st Army Band
- 402nd Army Band
- 403rd Army Band
- 404th Army Band

WAAC bands were later redesignated and officially activated in the Women's Army Corps (WAC) in January 1944. For a long time, the only Army Band made up of women, was the 14th Army WAC Band, which reported to the Women's Army Corps Training Center at Camp Lee in August 1948.

=== Mounted bands ===
In the first 100 years of the country's existence, mounted bands were relatively common in the ranks of military units. Mounted bands began to be assembled in the 1840s, taking multiple years to assemble. Mounted band that existed have included the 3rd Cavalry Regiment Mounted Band and the Mounted Band of the 2nd U.S. Cavalry. Mounted bands in the US Army were ultimately disbanded in the 1930s and 40s and by the end of the Second World War, there were no mounted bands left in the U.S.

=== Other bands ===
- Beginning in the 1880s, the United States Army Corps of Engineers maintained a band at the U.S. Army Engineer School (then the Engineers School at Willets Point, New York). Then, it was led by Swiss immigrant Julius Hamper, and was dissolved in the early 1900s after over 20 years of service in Washington D.C.
- Former service-wide bands include the Military Intelligence Corps Band, the Signal Corps Band and the Army Ground Forces Band.
- The Seventh Army Symphony Orchestra was the only symphonic orchestral ensemble to operate in the United States Army, operating from 1952 to 1962.
- The U.S. Army All-American Marching Band was an army-sponsored civilian marching band that recruited from high school senior musicians from 2007 to 2019.

== See also ==
- Marine Corps Musician Enlistment Option Program
- Navy Music Program
- List of United States Air Force bands
- United States Coast Guard Band
- United States military bands
- British military bands
- Canadian military bands
- Directorate of Music
