= 323rd Army Band =

United States Army military band

"Fort Sam's Own" 323rd Army Band
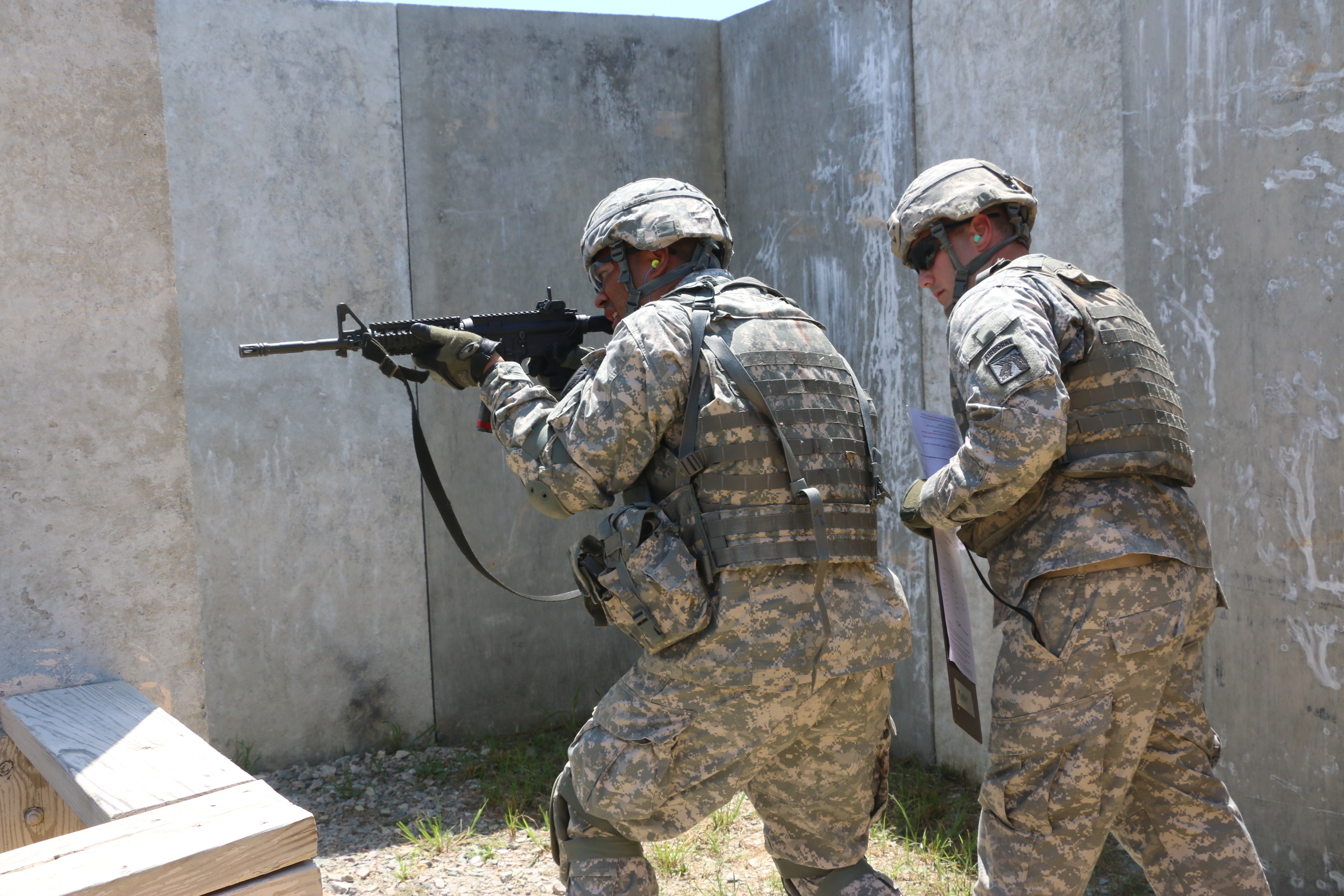
- A trombone player with the 323rd Army Band engages several targets during a "stress shoot" marksmanship practice at Fort Bragg, 26 August 2014.
- Active: 1942-Present
- Country: United States
- Branch: United States Army
- Type: Military band
- Role: Public duties
- Size: 42
- Part of: United States Army North
- HQ: 2436 Hood Street, Fort Sam Houston, San Antonio, Texas
- Nickname: Fort Sam's Own
- Decorations: Superior Unit Award

The 323rd Army Band "Fort Sam's Own" is a United States Army military band currently based at Fort Sam Houston/Joint Base San Antonio in San Antonio, Texas. It is attached to United States Army North of which it is the primary ensemble. It is designed to be a command-level support asset and consists of 62 personnel. It is one of two bands based at JBSA (the other being the Air Force Band of the West) and is one of many bands that have existed since their inception in the city in 1893.

== History ==
It was activated in 1942 at Carlisle Barracks in Carlisle, Pennsylvania, which is now the site of the U.S. Army War College. At its founding, it was originally known as the Medical Field Service School Band until 1944 when it was designated the 323rd Army Service Forces Band. Two years later, the took part in a large move along two medical schools to Texas where it founded and was stationed at Fort Sam Houston, which the army designated as the principal military medical training facility, earning it the nickname of the "Home of Army Medicine". In 1975, the band was redesignated as the 5th Army Band and on 22 July 2004, was renamed to the United States Army Medical Command Band (MEDCOM Band). Its final performance as the Medical Command Band took place on 13 October 2011 at San Antonio's Blesse Auditorium, before being officially reorganized as "Fort Sam's Own" 6 days later. In the summer of 2016, the United States Department of the Army listed Fort Sam's Band as one of the bands that will be dissolved due to a reorganization of army bands in the Armed Forces. In April 2018, Lieutenant General Jeffrey Buchanan of U.S. Army North, said that the order to dissolve the band was reversed by the Department of Defense after a rise in dissenting voices opposed to the decision. By mid-May, the band was confirmed to have been removed from the list of bands being dissolved and continued its activities with the previous orders to dissolve it still in effect, which as a result, caused the personnel count to go down to 16.

== Activities and performances ==
In addition to its military duties at JBSA, the band moreover performs in the local community and the surrounding area. The band also aides band programs annually at schools in the San Antonio area including the East Central Independent School District and the San Antonio Independent School District. In 2017, the band opened the annual Houston Thanksgiving Day Parade. Members of the then-MEDCOM Band were the center of a 2013 study which concluded that musicians have a high rate of Musculoskeletal disorders, which is an injury to the human musculoskeletal system.

=== Supporting ensembles ===
There are several supporting ensembles that add to the musical style of the band:

- Ceremonial Band
- Marching Band
- Concert Band
- "Intrepid Winds" Woodwind Quintet
- "Biohazard Brass Band" (New Orleans-style)
- "After 5" Jazz Combo
- "35 to Nowhere" Rock band
- "Mission Brass Quintet"

== See also ==
- Signal Corps Band
- Military Intelligence Corps Band
