= Marine Corps Women's Reserve Band =

Female military band in the United States Marine Corps

- Active: 1943 – 1945
- Country: United States
- Branch: United States Marine Corps
- Type: military band
- Role: Public duties and a booster of the esprit de corps
- Size: 43 members
- Garrison/HQ: Camp Lejuene, North Carolina
- March: Marine Hymn (official hymn); Semper Fidelis (branch march); March of the Women Marines (unit march)

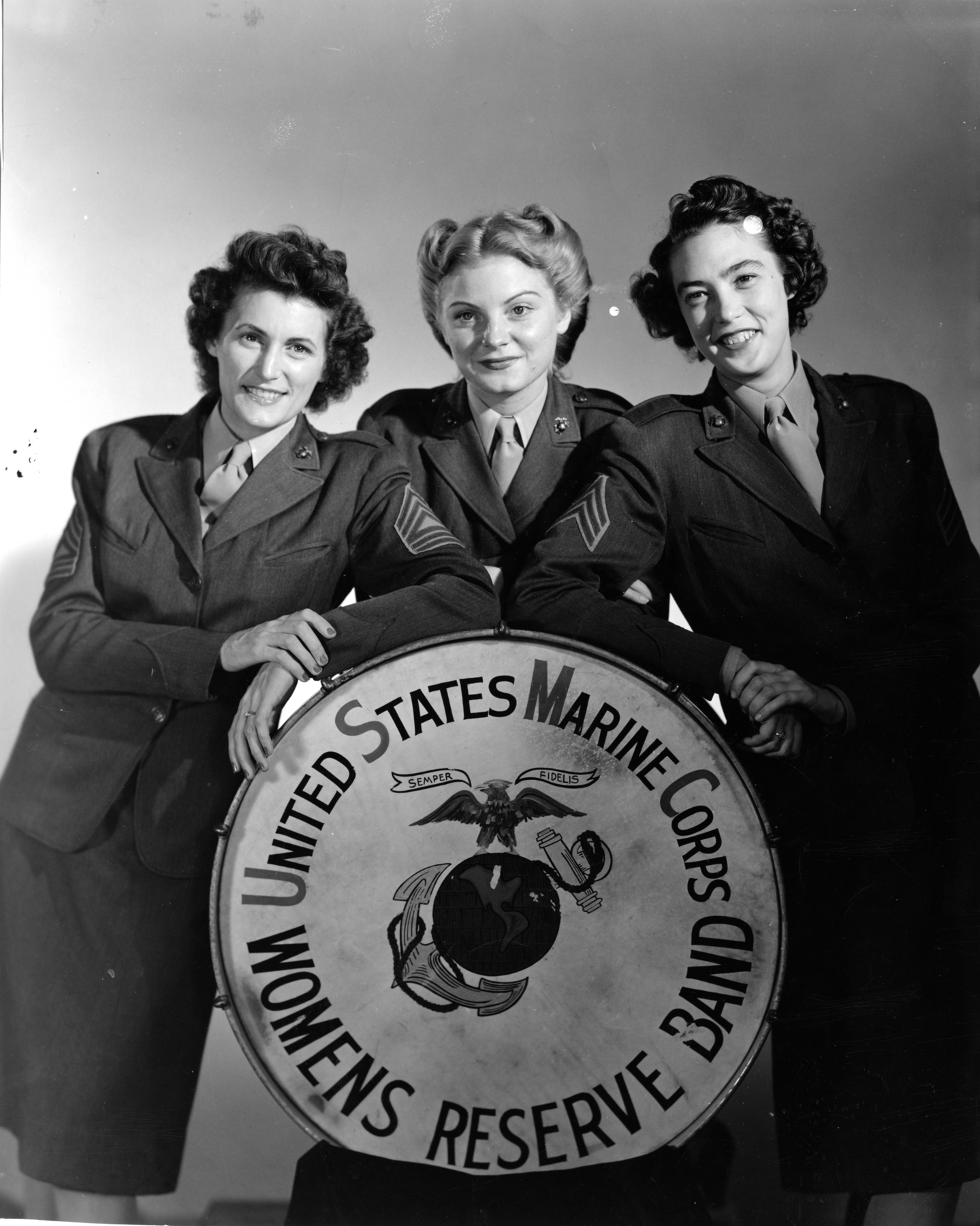
Marine Corps Women's Reserve Band

The Marine Corps Women's Reserve Band (MCWR Band) was a United States Marine Corps military band, unique in its all female composition, that served during the Second World War. The band was stationed at Camp Lejeune and included 43 members.

== History ==
The March of the Women Marines, as performed by the United States Marine Band, was the official march of the band and the women's reserve.

Women began enlisting in the USMC in July 1943 and musicians attended recruit training prior to being admitted into the band. Four senior musicians from the United States Marine Band at Marine Barracks, Washington, D.C. arrived in November to assist with the training of this up and coming band. Within 2 1/2 months, the band grew from 15 to 37 members. By 1944, other ensembles formed within the group, including a Dixieland ensemble and dance band. In addition to its duties at Camp Lejeune, the MCWR Band conducted three tours, two during the war and one during the post-war period as a welcome home celebration. Its first tour was in 1944 and domestic in nature, stopping at USMC bases on the east coast such as a base in Chicago. The tour lasted just over a month and consisted of dozens of concerts, parades, and just 5 radio shows. On 14 November 1944, one of the latter events was fulfilled with its sit in for the weekly Dream Hour by the President's Own Marine Band broadcast. The band was conducted by Charlotte Plummer Owen.

== See also ==
- Canadian Women's Army Corps Band
- 404th Armed Service Forces Band
- 543rd Air Force Band
