= Teresa King =

Retired Sergeant Major in the US Army

Teresa L. King
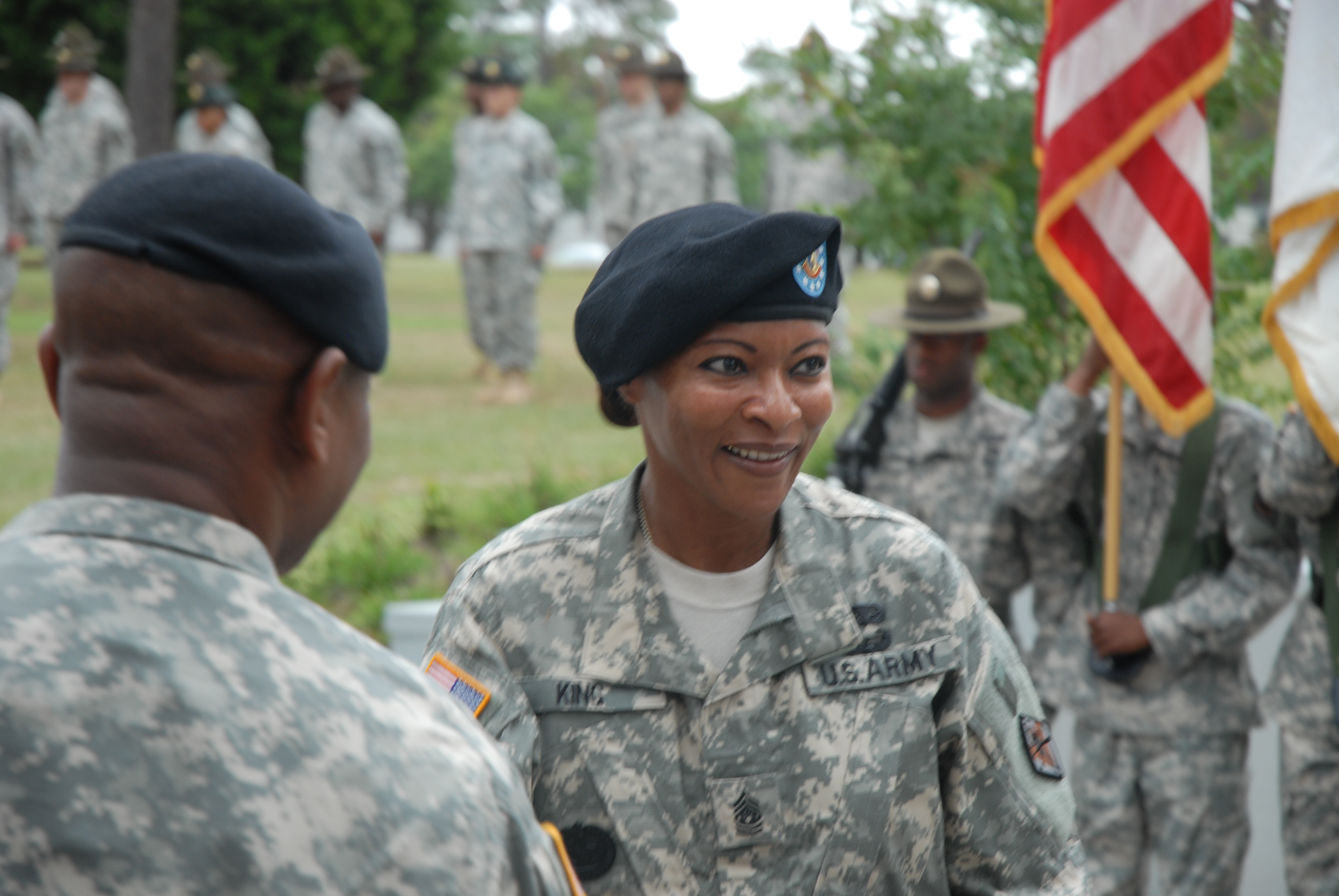
- Command Sergeant Major Teresa King at the change of responsibility ceremony taking over as commandant of the Drill Sergeant School, September 2009
- Born: 1961 (age 64–65); Clinton, North Carolina
- Military career
- Allegiance: United States
- Branch: United States Army
- Service years: 1980–2013
- Rank: Command Sergeant Major
- Unit: XVIII Airborne Corps
- Awards: Legion of Merit; Defense Meritorious Service Medal; Meritorious Service Medal (6)

Teresa L. King (born 1961) is a retired sergeant major in the United States Army. She was the first female commandant of the United States Army Drill Sergeant School at Fort Jackson, South Carolina.

== Early life ==
King was born in Clinton, North Carolina, in 1961, the eighth of twelve children. Her father was a sharecropper who grew cucumbers and tobacco.

== Army career ==
King enlisted in the United States Army in 1980 and went to Basic Combat Training and Advanced Individual Training at Fort Jackson, South Carolina. After training, King's first assignment was as a postal clerk in the 139th Postal Company located in Stuttgart, Germany.

She volunteered for two years of drill sergeant duty and graduated from the United States Army Drill Sergeant School. She was later assigned to 5th Battalion, 3rd Brigade Combat Team, at Fort Dix, New Jersey. She later served as the battalion's personnel sexual assault director (SAD).

In 1987, King served as the administrative assistant to the Chief of Staff of the United States Army at the Pentagon. In 1988, she became the administrative assistant to the Director of the Defense Security Cooperation Agency, or DSCA (formerly the Defense Security Assistance Agency, or DSAA), Office of the Secretary of Defense, also at the Pentagon. In 1991, King was assigned as aide to the senior enlisted advisor of the director of the DSCA, Office of the Secretary of Defense. She served there until 1993.

King left the Pentagon and was assigned to 18th Personnel Service Battalion at Fort Bragg, North Carolina, until 1996. King then served as the first sergeant for 19th Adjutant General Company (Postal) at Camp Casey, South Korea until 1997. In 1997, King became the first female First Sergeant for Headquarters and Headquarters Company, XVIII Airborne Corps, the largest company on Fort Bragg. King held that assignment until 2001.

From 2002 to 2005, she served as command sergeant major of 3rd Battalion, 13th Infantry Regiment tasked with Basic Combat Training at Fort Jackson, South Carolina. She was inducted into the Order of St Maurice, Patron Saint of the Infantry, in 2005.

In 2005, King was assigned as the battalion command sergeant major of the Supreme Headquarters, Allied Powers Europe (SHAPE) battalion, United States Army, NATO for two years. In 2007, she was assigned as the command sergeant major of 369th Adjutant General Battalion in Fort Jackson, South Carolina, for another two years.

In 2009, King was appointed as commandant of the Drill Sergeant School, the first female in its history. She served as Commandant until mid-2012, and worked to improve the school's program of instruction, focusing on the fundamentals and reinforcing standards and discipline, as well as moving the school from its old barracks to a new campus on Fort Jackson in 2011.

In 2011, King was suspended from her role as commandant of the Drill Sergeant School due to an internal personnel action investigation around her command style. She was cleared of wrongdoing six months later and returned to duty.

She retired from the Army effective May 31, 2013, and was awarded the Legion of Merit. Her retirement came with a $10 million administrative claim of mistreatment feeling she was defamed due to bias against her as a woman, an African-American, and lack of service in a combat theater, and pushed out of the role of commandant. When the administrative claim was not resolved in her favor, King sued the Army for racial and sexual discrimination.

King was inducted into the Drill Sergeant Hall of Fame in 2017 as well as the National Women in Military Service to America Memorial at Arlington, Virginia.

In 2019, King successfully sued the operators of a website for defaming her by alleging that personal misconduct had led to her suspension, and the publisher was ordered to pay her $150,000 in damages. In 2023, King's request for the Army Board of Corrections for Military Records to remove from her personnel record the negative performance appraisal from 2011 that led to her suspension was successful, and the report was deleted from her file.

== Personal ==
King holds an associate degree in General Studies from Northern Virginia Community College. She completed a bachelor's degree in interdisciplinary studies at Liberty University in 2014, and in 2023 she completed a master of theological studies degree at Liberty.

== Awards ==
Decorations, service medals and ribbons:

- Legion of Merit
- Defense Meritorious Service Medal
- Meritorious Service Medal (with five Oak Leaf Clusters)
- Joint Service Commendation Medal
- Army Commendation Medal (with six Oak Leaf Clusters)
- Joint Meritorious Unit Award
- National Defense Service Medal (with Service Star)
- Korean Defense Service Medal
- Global War on Terrorism Service Medal
- Military Outstanding Volunteer Service Medal
- Noncommissioned Officer Professional Development Ribbon
- Army Service Ribbon
- Army Overseas Service Ribbon

Badges

- Office of the Secretary of Defense Identification Badge
- Drill Sergeant Badge
- Parachutist Badge
- Air Assault Badge
- Canadian Parachutist Badge
- German Parachutist Badge
