= Directorate of Music =

Greek military personnel department

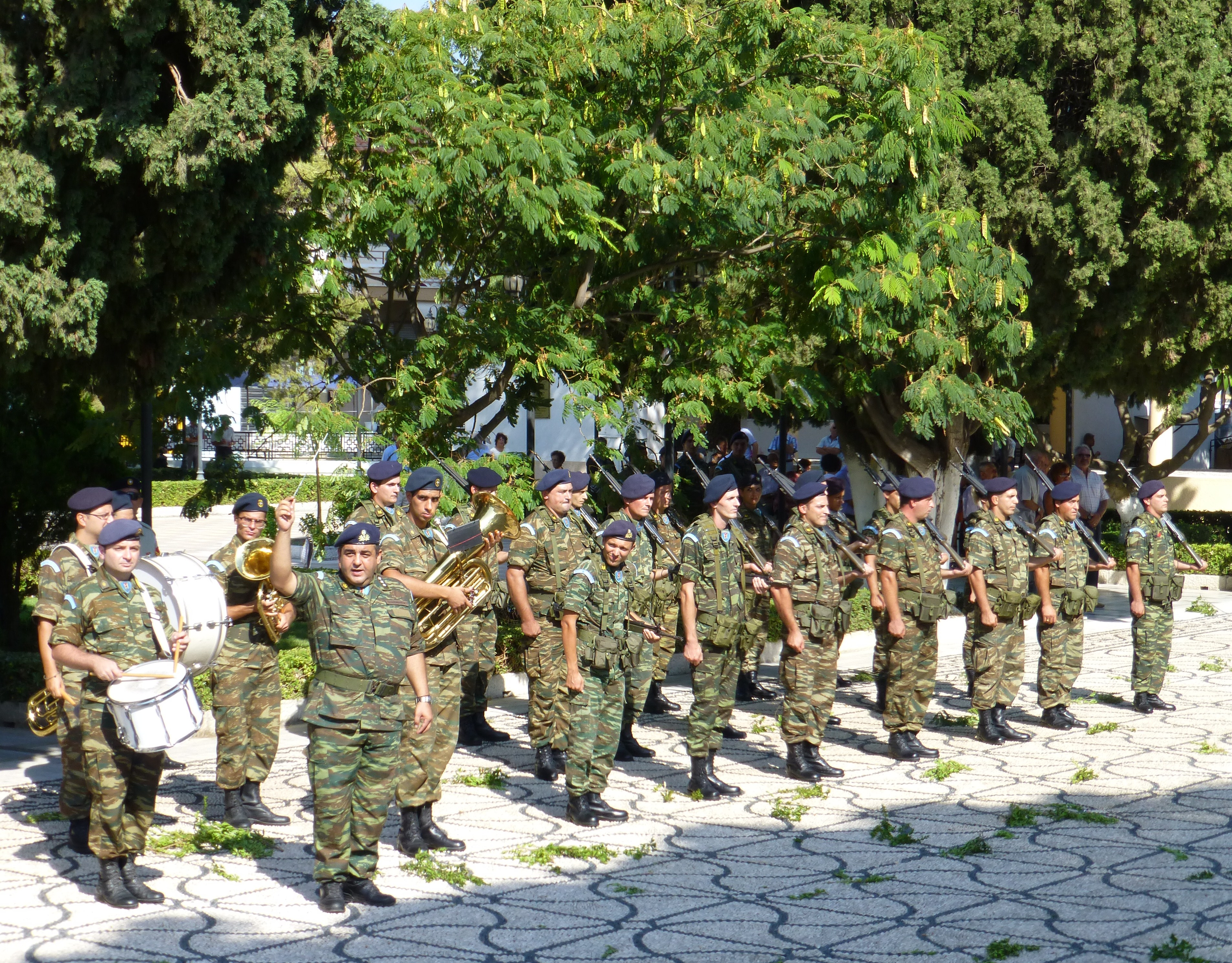
An army band in August 2013.

The Directorate of Music of the Hellenic Army General Staff (sometimes referred to as B8), is a personnel department in the Hellenic Army that presides over the organization of military bands in the army as well as the planning of musical functions in the army. Eligible volunteers at the B8 must have a high school diploma or bachelor's degree and a certificate from a conservatory or school of music.

== History of bands ==
After the Fall of Constantinople in 1453, musicians from the Greek side who came from the military bands of the Byzantine Empire fled to the mountains, where they composed new works that were related to their plight. Constantinople, which was renamed to Istanbul by the new authorities from the Ottoman Empire, began to sport Turkish-style military bands including Mehter from the Janissary Corps. As the Greek War of Independence was beginning in the early 19th century, a band which was then named as the Musical Troupe (Μουσικός Θίασος) was created within the newly formed army of Colonel Charles Nicolas Fabvier. Based in Nafplio under the direction of Ernst Michael Mangel, it is today regarded the first military band to be founded in Greek history. During the war, the band took part in the Athens campaign of 1825, as well as expeditions to islands such as Euboea and Chios. On 15 November 1843, King Otto established the School of Music with it under Mangel's management. This school has been, for over two centuries, training the future musicians of the Hellenic Army's many military bands.

== Inspectorate ==
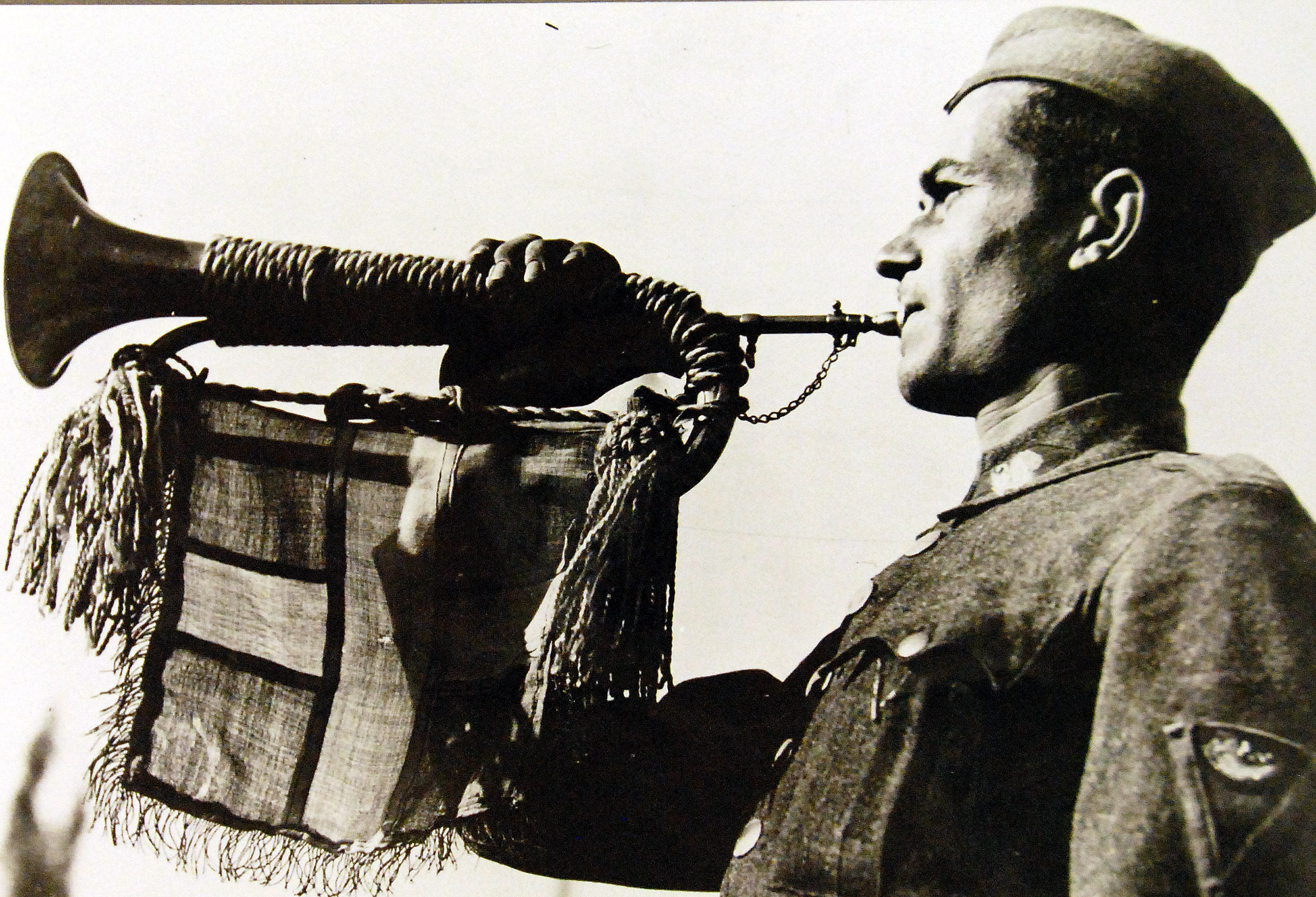
An army trumpeter in the early 1940s.

=== 19th century ===
In 1877, the office Military Music Inspector was occupied once again, this time by Christian Welker, who was subsequently promoted to a higher rank. In 1880 a Special Music Service was established and the arrangements for musical inspections were regulated. By 1882, a manner for the classification of musicians was created. The number of musicians fluctuated depending on the unit until 1893, when all bands except the Athens Guard Band was abolished due to economic reasons. In 1904, military bands were being reformed after more than a decade in absence. Three divisional bands were formed in addition to the existing Music Guard of Athens and the Music School. After the Balkan Wars in 1914, the General Inspectorate of Military Music was created.

=== Early 20th century ===
A new era of Greek military music began during the First World War. A General Inspectorate of Military Music based in Athens and a military music band based in Thessaloniki were both established. Defined the concept of military music as one consisting of folk bands, choirs and model bands. At the time, each band had the following numbers: 76 people (Military Band of Athens), 50 people (Military Band of Thessaloniki) and 42 people (Army Band). From 1917 to 1937, the inspectorate was led by internationally acclaimed National Composer of Greece and later a member of the Academy of Athens Manolis Kalomiris. Alexander Kazantzis (director of the Thessaloniki State Conservatory and professor of violin) occupied the position of Thessaloniki Inspector until 1929 when the post was demobilized and abolished. The Department of Military Music took part in the Asia Minor campaign of the Greco-Turkish War (1919–1922), following the 1st Battalion's Army Headquarters in their military operations.

=== War years ===
At the time of the Greek mobilization for the war on 28 October 1940, bands came from all the army divisions. Many of these bands participated in the Greco-Italian War that would last until the spring of the following year. At the end of the war, many musicians left for the Middle East, where they composed the Band of the Expeditionary Corps, under Aristide Kardamitsis. The Military Band of Athens was the only band to serve under Axis occupation of Greece.

=== Post-war ===
In 1945, three bands were formed with additional bands being assigned to each army corps and division. In January 1953, the Band of the Greek Expeditionary Corps landed in Inchon to offer their services in supporting coalition troops during the Korean War. In 1958, after serving under various other names, the B8 was created.

== Symbols ==
The emblem is made up of the lyre, which was the national musical instrument of Ancient Greece and is used widely in the emblems of military bands around the world. It is surrounded by two branches of laurel. The motto of B8 is as follows: "The music of the Gods has always been a finding of God".

== List ==
- Military Band of Athens
- Military Band of Alexandroúpoli
- I Army Corps Band
- II Army Corps Band
- III Army Corps Band
- IV Army Corps Band
- V Army Corps Band
- Band of the 21st Armoured Brigade
- Band of the 88th Military Command
- Band of the 4th Infantry Division

== Aspects of Greek army bands ==
Greek army bands follow the British precedent with additional influences from Turkey and Russia, which can be seen as the bands are led occasionally by trumpeters at the front files. Some bands also include drummers in the front rank, with the units flags on the drums mirroring the eagle drums of the United States Army Band and units honour of the former line regimental bands of the British Army.

== See also ==
- United States military bands
- Russian military bands
- Hellenic Air Force Band
- Hellenic Naval Band
- List of marching bands
- March (music)
