= Signal Corps Band =

U.S. Army military band

434th Army Band
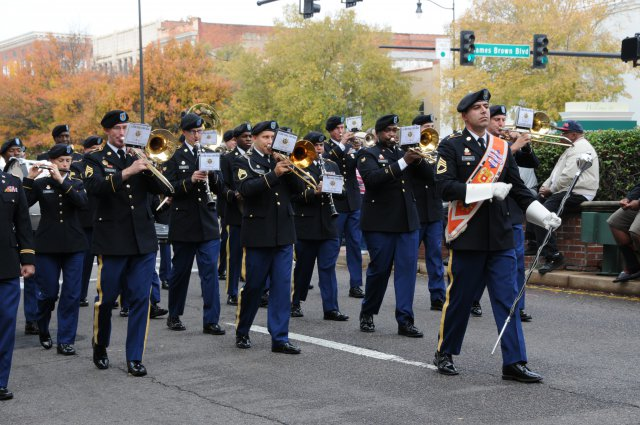
- The Signal Corps Band pictured in 2012
- Active: 1943 – 1946, 1950 – 2016
- Country: United States
- Branch: United States Army
- Type: Military band
- Role: Public duties
- Final post: Fort Gordon, Georgia
- Nickname(s): Signal Corps Band
- Engagements: World War II: New Guinea Campaign; Battle of Luzon
- Decorations: Philippine Republic Presidential Unit Citation (1944)

Insignia
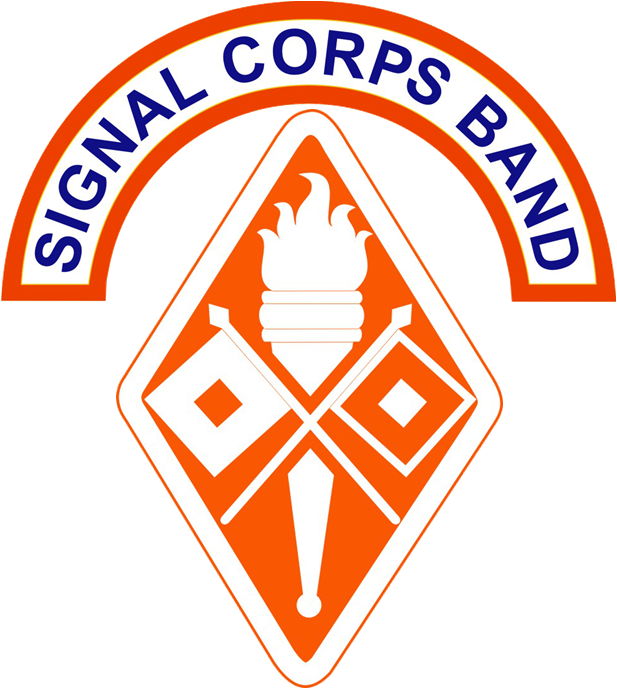
- Distinctive unit insignia

The Signal Corps Band (officially the 434th Army Band) was a military band maintained by the United States Army and associated with the United States Army Signal Corps. It was activated in 1943 as the band of the 4th Engineer Amphibian Brigade and was posted to Fort Gordon, Georgia, for most of its existence. The band was inactivated in 2016.

The Signal Corps Band did not share a common lineage with an identically named unit active from 1930 to 1944.

== History ==
=== Predecessor unit ===
The band of the 13th Cavalry Regiment was organized in 1901. In 1916 it saw action in New Mexico at the Battle of Columbus where it became separated from the rest of the regiment and had to engage Villistas armed only with pistols, during which three bandsmen were killed in action. Inactivated in 1930, its equipment and personnel were reorganized as the newly activated Signal Corps Band.

In 1941 Edward Matlack, great-great grandson of Timothy Matlack, the scribe of the United States Declaration of Independence and Secretary of the Supreme Council of Pennsylvania, was among the Signal Corps Band's personnel. The band was inactivated in 1944 and its equipment and personnel used to form the 389th Army Band, which was later given the special designation Army Materiel Command Band before being inactivated in 2018.

=== Modern unit ===
The Signal Corps Band, officially known as the 434th Army Band, was activated in February 1943 within the Army of the United States as the band of the 4th Engineer Amphibian Brigade at Fort Devens, Massachusetts. In 1944 it was redesignated the 434th Army Service Forces Band, before being inactivated two years later. In 1955 it was reactivated within the regular United States Army at Fort Gordon, Georgia and redesignated as the 434th Army Band. In 1985 it received the special designation "United States Army Signal Corps Band" commonly rendered as "Signal Corps Band".

In 2013 the Army announced the band would be inactivated within three years. It was inactivated in October 2016, and its colors were cased and transferred to the Center for Military History for storage. Its last Commander was CW4 Scott MacDonald. Twelve musicians formerly with the band were retained on-post at Fort Gordon but formally assigned to the 282nd Army Band at Fort Jackson, South Carolina.

==== Notable performances ====
The band went on notable concert tours of the southeast United States in 2004 and 2005 performing for audiences numbering in the thousands. In 2011 the Signal Corps Band's jazz ensemble performed in concert with Wycliffe Gordon. In 2014 the Signal Corps Band performed a concert for the 70th anniversary of the D-Day Invasion in Augusta, GA. In 2015, the Band performed for packed houses at the Ft. Gordon Dinner theatre in a tribute to Frank Sinatra’s 100th birthday.

== Organization ==
As of 2008, the Signal Corps Band had 35 personnel assigned to it.

== See also ==
- Military Intelligence Corps Band
