= Fort Jackson (South Carolina) =

Military facility in South Carolina, USA

United States Army Training Center & Fort Jackson
- eponyms: President Andrew Jackson
- Part of United States Army Recruiting Command
- Columbia metropolitan area, South Carolina; Richland County, South Carolina; 53,000 acres (21,000 ha, 83 sq mi, 210 km^{2})
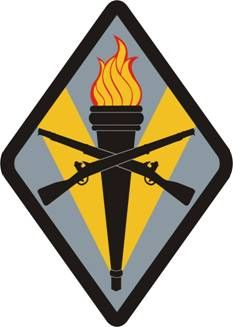
- USATC & Fort Jackson distinctive unit insignia

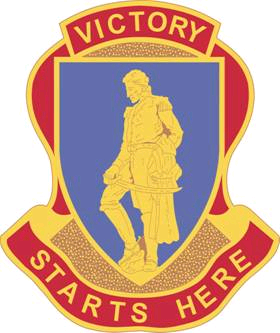

Site information
- Controlled by: United States Army
- Website: home.army.mil/jackson

Location
- Location within South Carolina Location within the United States
- Coordinates: 34°2′21″N 80°49′20″W

Site history
- Built: 1917; 109 years ago
- In use: 1917–present

Garrison information
- Garrison: Chaplain Center and School; Soldier Support Institute; Drill Sergeant School; U.S. Army Basic Training Center of Excellence

Fort Jackson is a United States Army Installation. The US Army United States Army Transformation and Training Command (T2COM) operates one of four Basic Combat Training (BCT) programs on this installation. Fort Jackson is named for Andrew Jackson, a United States Army general and the seventh president of the United States (1829–1837) who was born in the border region of North and South Carolina. (Note: Fort Jackson is often said, erroneously, to be named after Thomas "Stonewall" Jackson, a U.S. officer who later joined the Confederate army during the American Civil War.)

== History ==
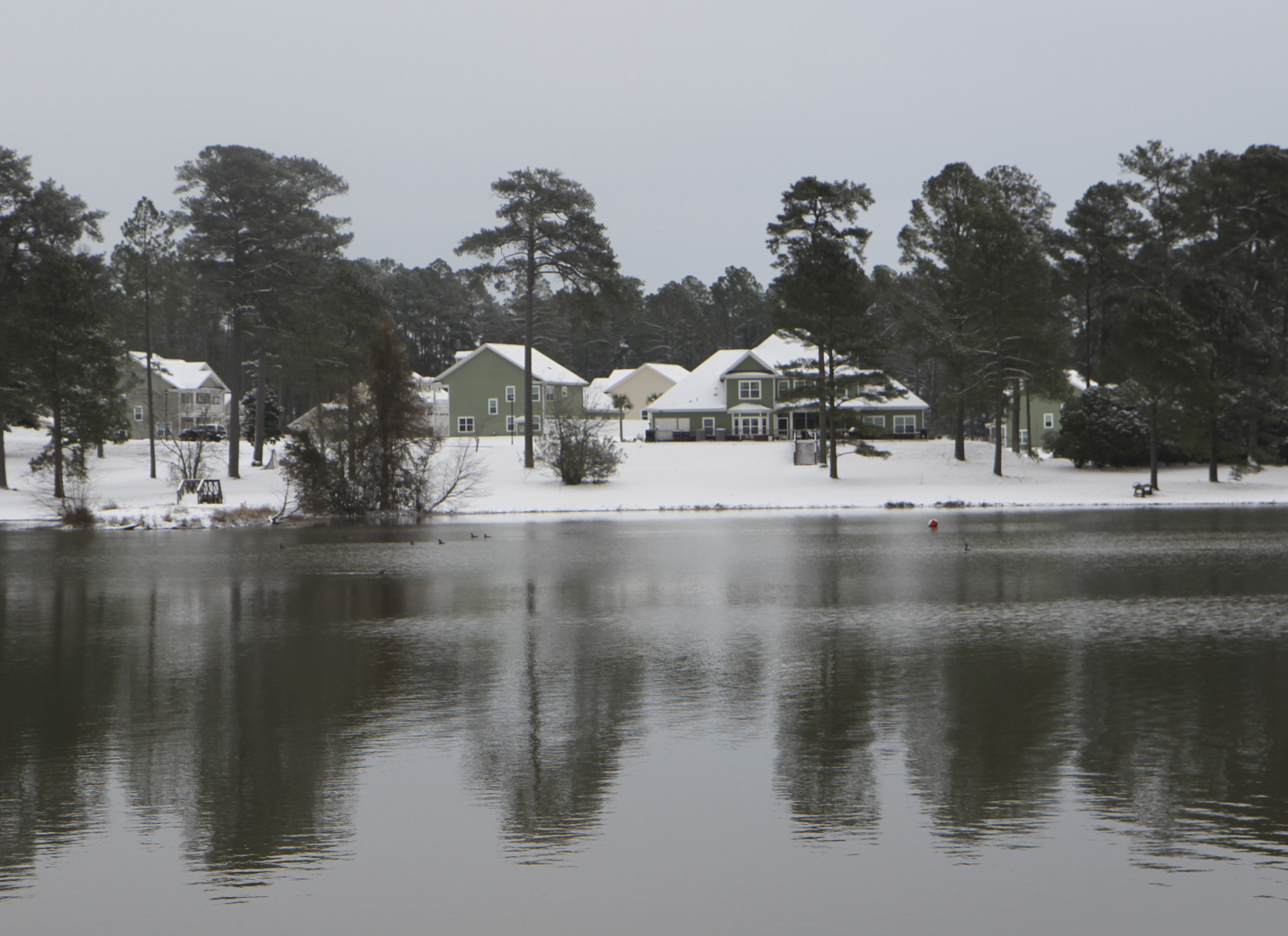
Fort Jackson quarters in the winter.

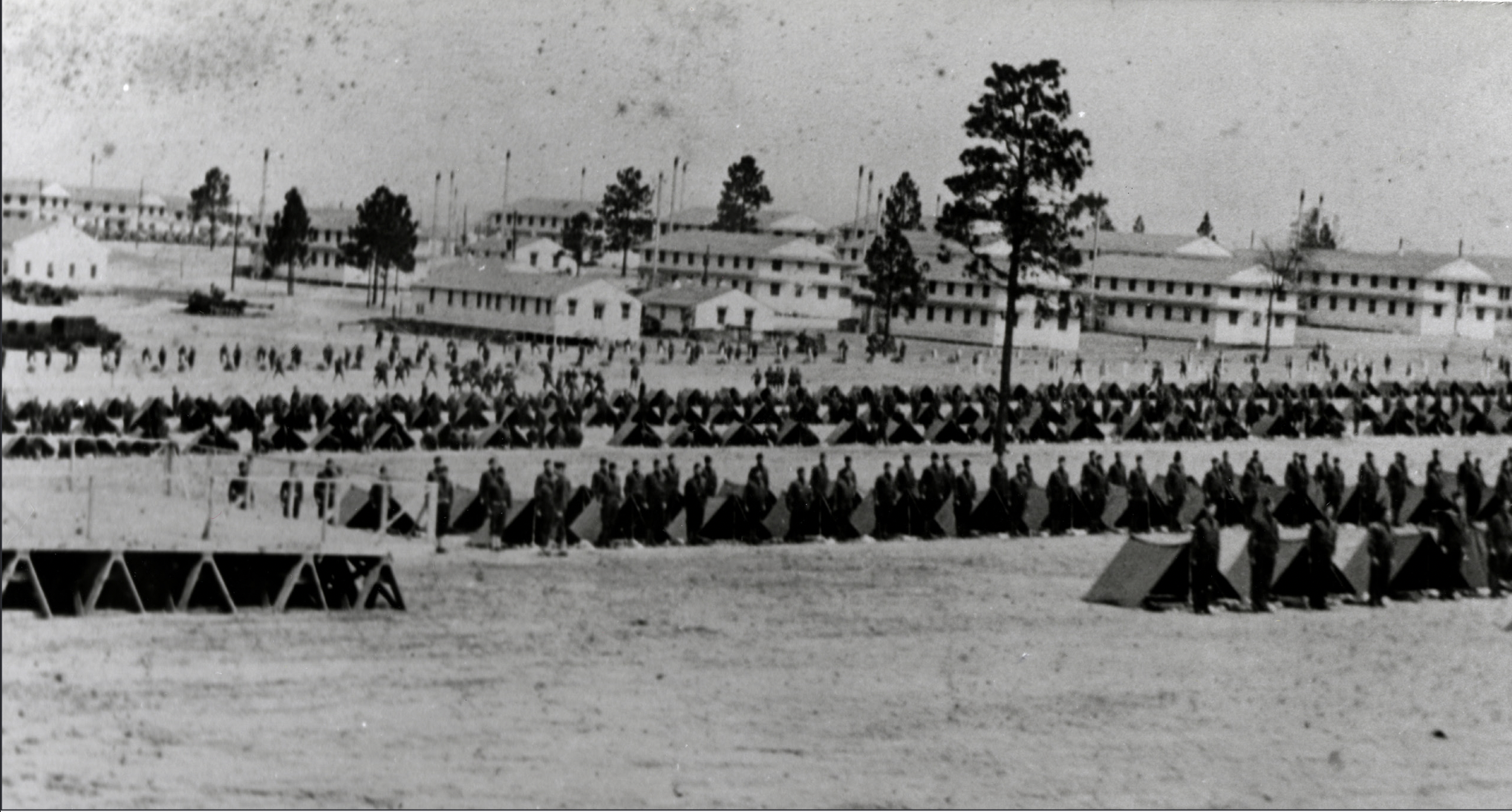
Camp Jackson, Columbia, SC, 1917– World War I.

ARNG recruits arriving at Fort Jackson for BCT

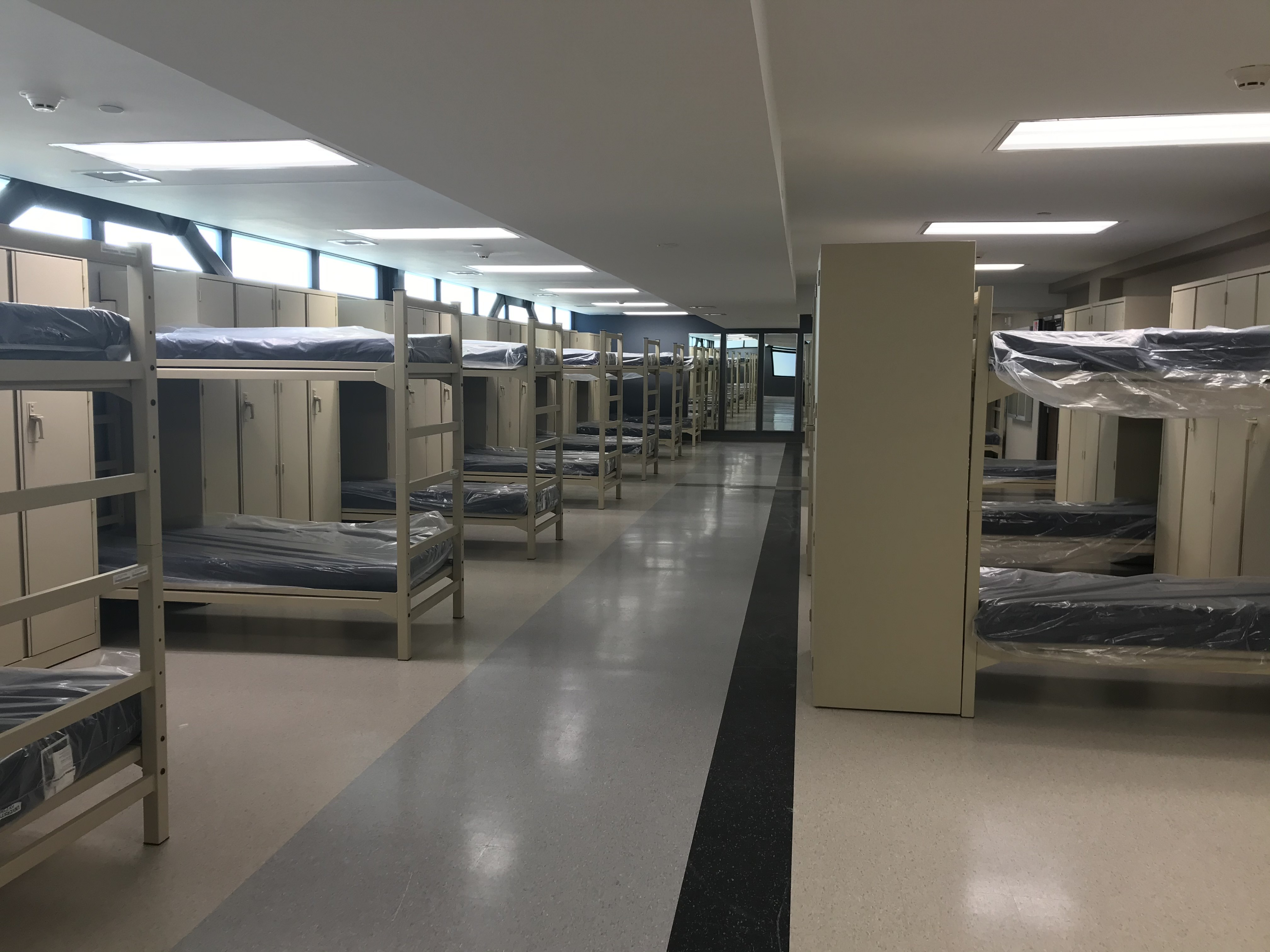
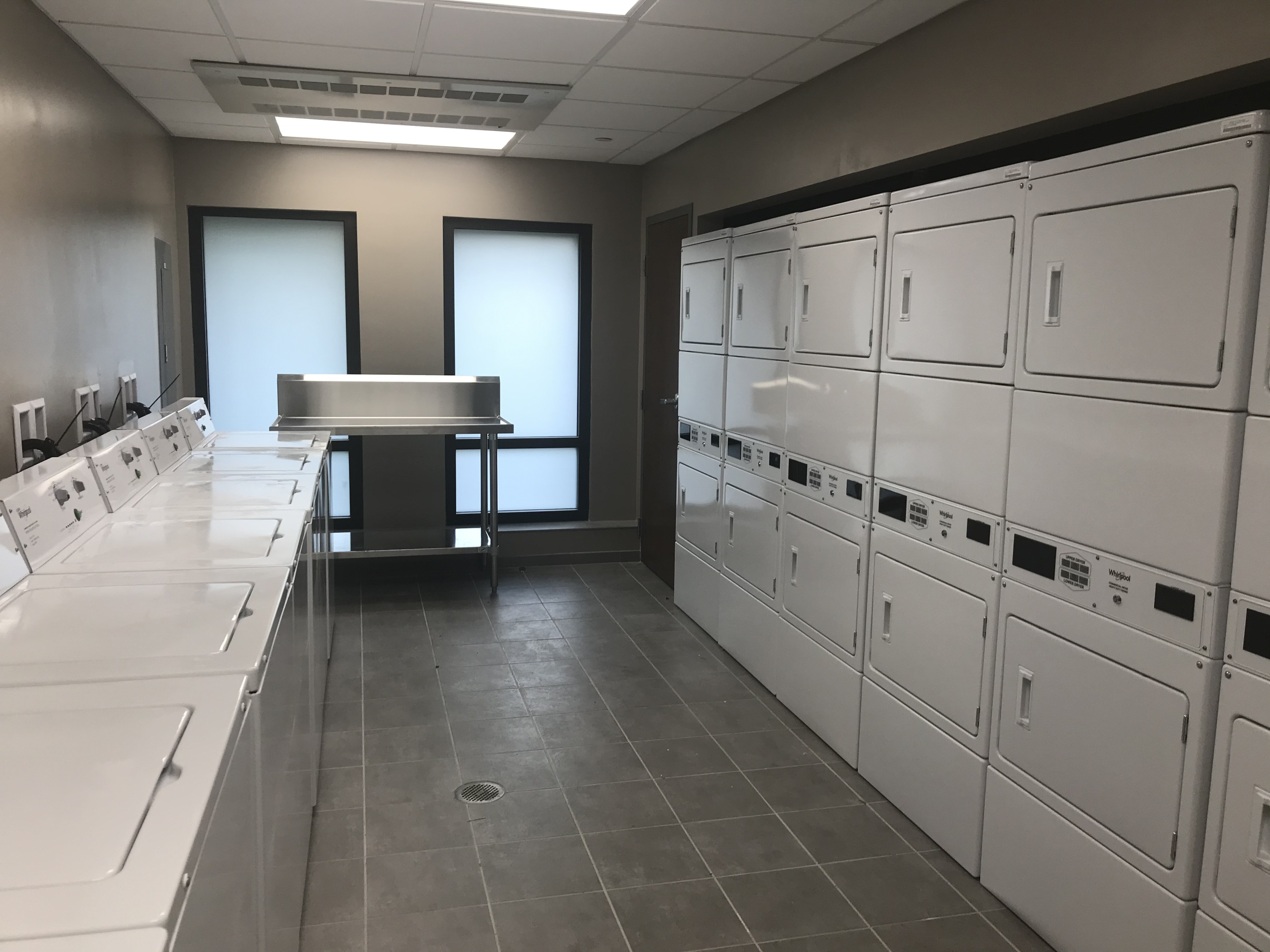
Reception battalion barracks after being renovated in 2020
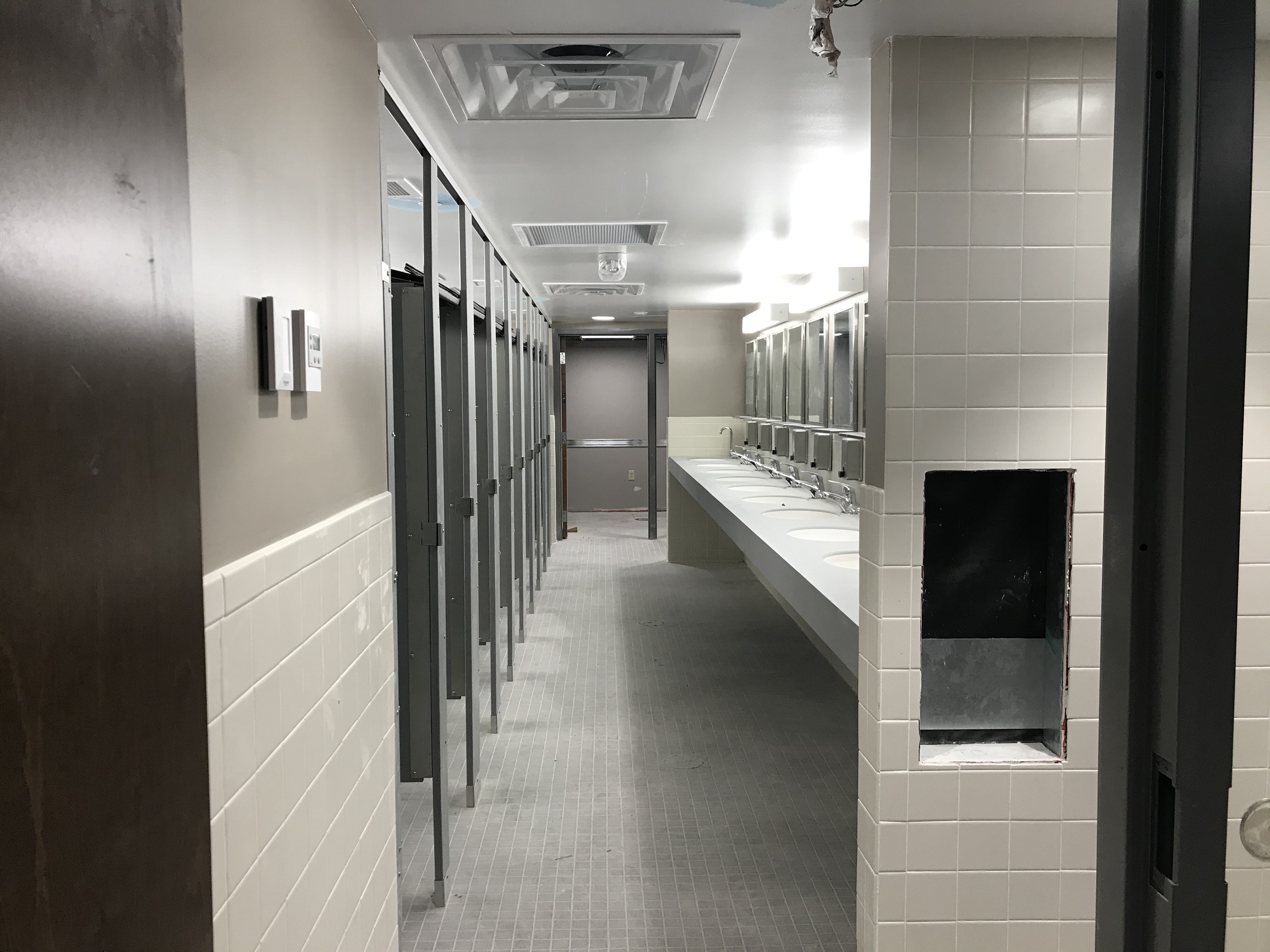
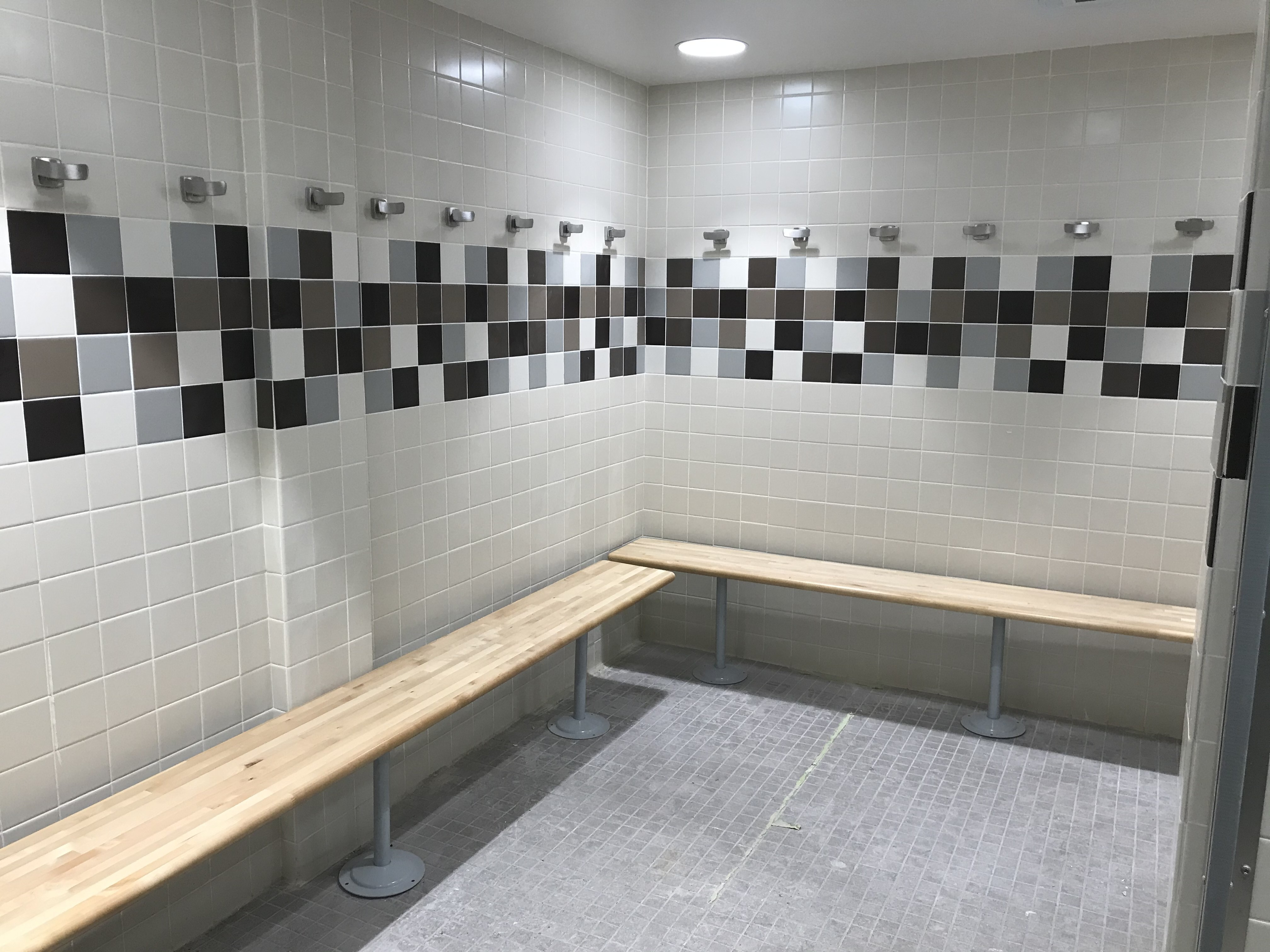
Reception battalion barracks latrines and showers

Fort Jackson was founded in 1917 at Camp Jackson as the US entered World War I. At the conclusion of World War I, Camp Jackson was shut down and the Camp was abandoned 25 April 1922, pursuant to General Orders No. 33, War Department, 27 July 1921. Camp Jackson was reactivated for World War II, where Franklin D. Roosevelt and George C. Marshall hosted a demonstration of the combat-readiness of several divisions for Winston Churchill and Alan Brooke in preparation of the abandoned Operation Roundup. At the conclusion of World War II, the post was to have been deactivated by 1950; however, the outbreak of the Korean War caused the post to remain active and it is still functioning in the early 21st Century.

Fort Jackson is the largest and most active initial entry training center in the U.S. Army, training 50 percent of all soldiers entering the Army each year. Providing the Army with new soldiers is the post's primary mission. 35,000 potential soldiers attend basic training and 8,000 advanced individual training soldiers train at Fort Jackson annually. The training is provided by the 165th and 193rd Infantry Brigades Monday through Sunday for a ten-week period.

The post has other missions as well. While some military installations have experienced downsizing and closure in past years, Fort Jackson has added several new schools and training institutions since 1995, including the U.S. Army Soldier Support Institute, the Department of Defense Chaplain Center and School, and the National Center for Credibility Assessment, part of the Defense Intelligence Agency. In 2007, the Army consolidated all of its training facilities for drill sergeants at Fort Jackson, and in 2009, Command Sergeant Major Teresa King became the first woman to head what is now the sole drill sergeant school for the U.S. Army.

Fort Jackson encompasses more than 52,000 acres (210 km^{2}) of land, including 100 ranges and field training sites and more than 1,000 buildings. Soldiers, civilians, retirees and family members make up the Fort Jackson community that continues to grow in numbers and facilities. An additional 10,000 soldiers attend courses at the Soldier Support Institute, Chaplain Center and School, and Drill Sergeant School annually. An estimated 3,500 active duty personnel and their 12,000 military family members make the Fort Jackson area their home with about one-third of that total population residing on-post. Close to 3,500 civilians are employed at Fort Jackson and 46,000-plus retirees and their families receive services from this base.

On base, visitors can visit the U.S. Army Basic Combat Training Museum, previously known as the Fort Jackson Museum when it opened in 1974. The museum helps visitors learn the history of Fort Jackson since it was created in 1917. Admission into the Basic Combat Training Museum is open Monday through Friday, except for federal holidays, and admission is free.

Located in the heart of the Midlands of South Carolina, Fort Jackson was incorporated into the city of Columbia in October 1968 and is midway between New York City and Miami. Columbia has direct access to three interstate highways, I-20, I-26 and I-77, and indirect access to two additional interstates within 100 miles (160 km), I-95 and I-85. Average temperatures in the region range from a high of 90+ °F (32 °C) in July to a low of 34 °F (1 °C) in January. Annual rainfall averages around 48 inches (1,200 mm).

The fort has a significant economic impact on the local area. Annual expenditures by Fort Jackson exceed $716.9 million for salaries, utilities, contracts and other services. In addition, over 100,000 family members visit the Midlands area each year to attend basic training graduation activities, using local hotels, restaurants and shopping areas.

In 2020, the reception battalion barracks were renovated.

== Incidents ==
On 6 May 2021, 23-year-old Jovan Collazo, who was three weeks into United States Army Basic Training, fled his basic training dorm in an attempt to make it back to his home state of New Jersey. Authorities would later say he slipped away after a morning exercise session had ended. While his fellow trainees were showering, he had taken his army-issued M4 carbine and fled. He eventually made his way onto a school bus carrying 18 children and threatened the driver at gunpoint. He instructed the driver to take him to the nearest town and that he did not want to hurt anyone. After a short while, Collazo became flustered with both the driver and children and allowed everyone to exit the bus unharmed. He then attempted to drive the bus himself but stopped after driving roughly a mile. He then abandoned the bus, the rifle, and proceeded to try and make it on foot. He was apprehended by South Carolina police shortly after. Brigadier General Milford Beagle, the installation commander for Fort Jackson, later put out a statement saying that Collazo did not possess any ammunition for the M4 he was carrying, but both the bus driver and children on board would not be aware of that. Collazo is now facing multiple charges, including 19 federal counts of kidnapping, armed robbery, and carjacking. In the aftermath of the incident, Collazo has attempted to escape jail twice. Once while at the Richland County Jail, and a second attempt at a hospital where he was recovering from his previous attempt. In addition, as of 14 May 2021, Fort Jackson has "paused weapons immersion training" for soldiers in training "unless they are needed for a specific training event".

== Tenant units ==
As of December 2021

- 165th Infantry Brigade (Basic Combat Training)
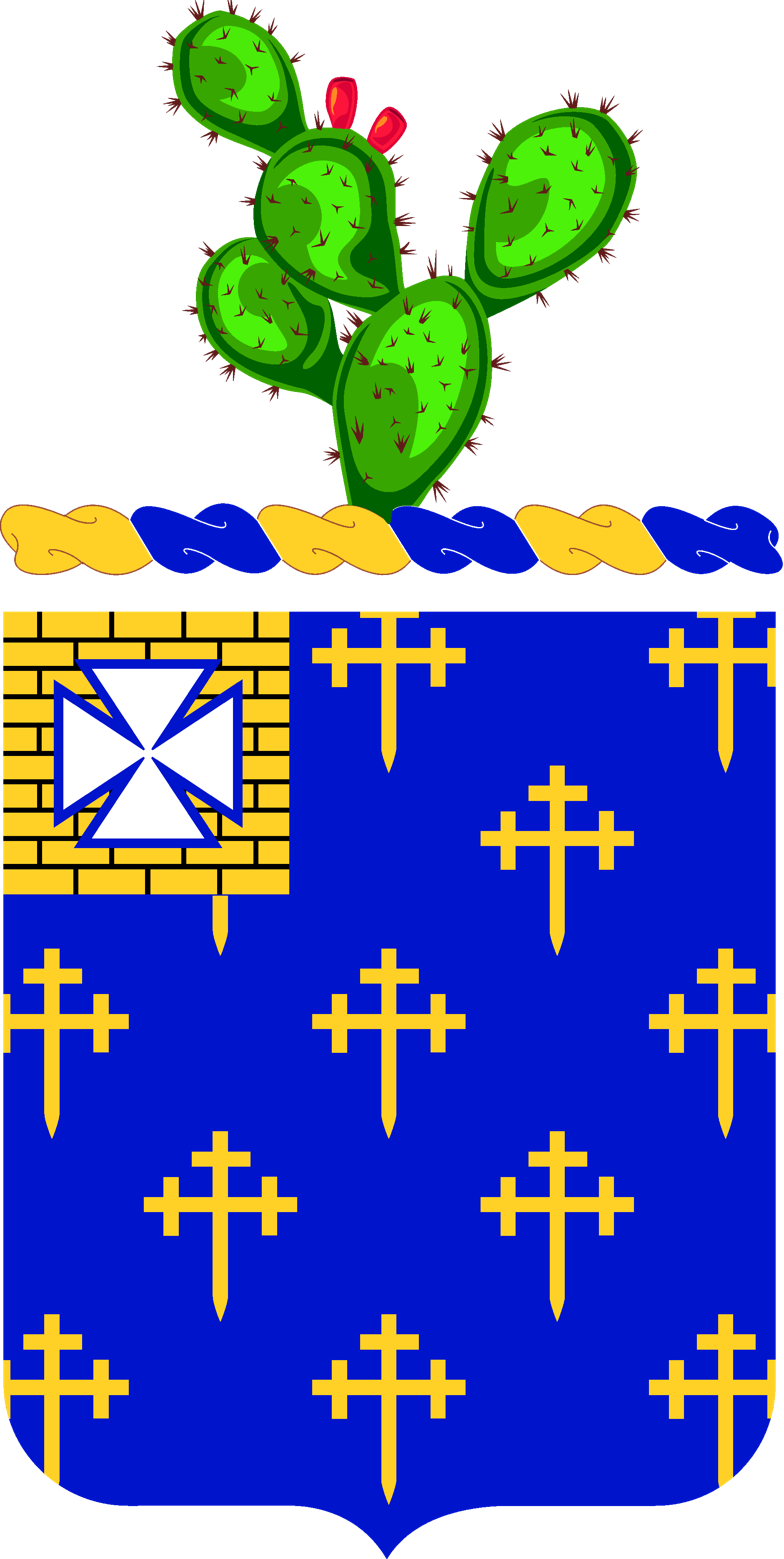
  - 1st Battalion, 34th Infantry Regiment
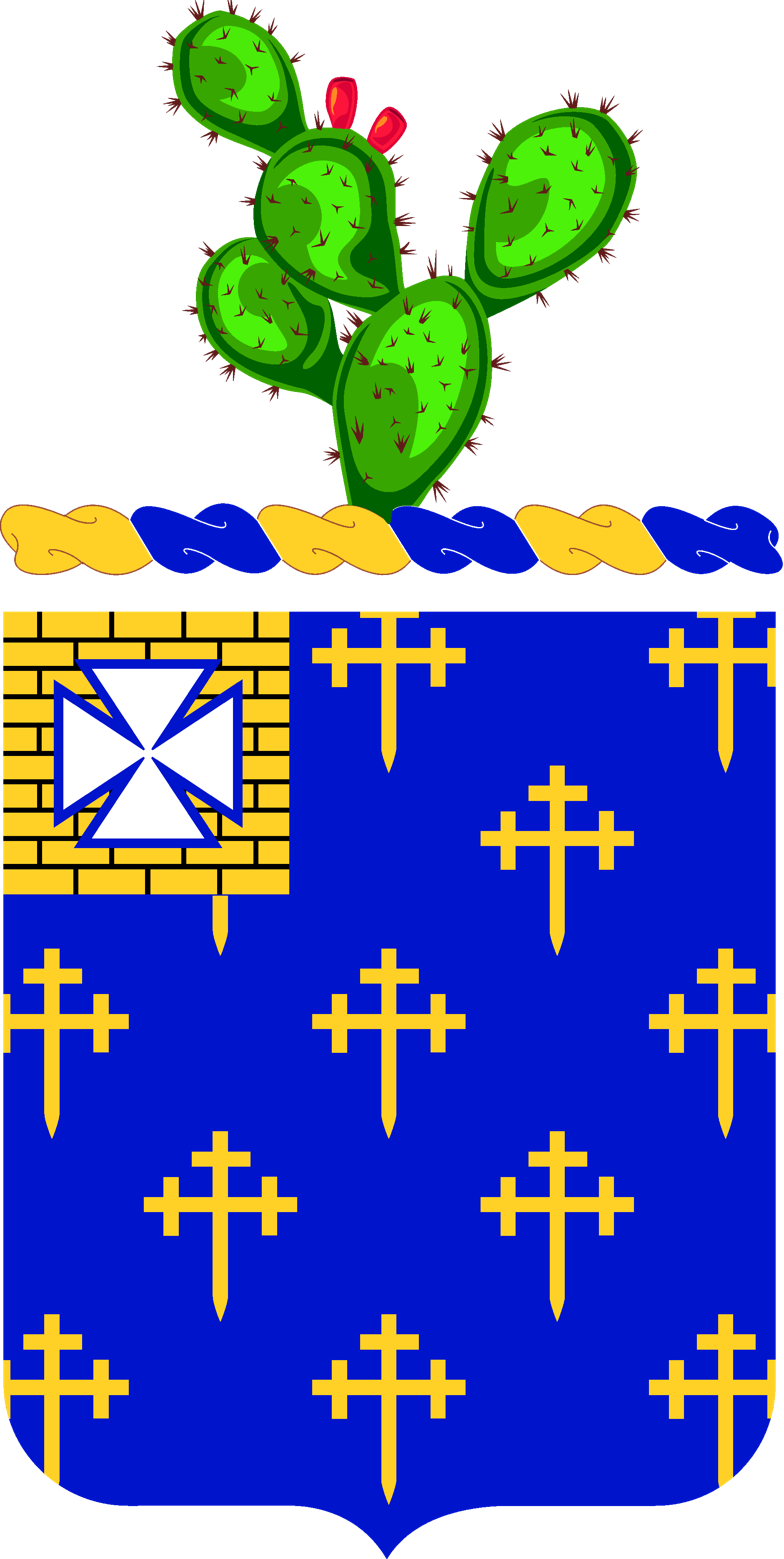
  - 3rd Battalion, 34th Infantry Regiment
  - 2nd Battalion, 39th Infantry Regiment
  - 3rd Battalion, 39th Infantry Regiment
  - 4th Battalion, 39th Infantry Regiment
  - 1st Battalion, 61st Infantry Regiment
- 193rd Infantry Brigade (Basic Combat Training)
  - 1st Battalion, 13th Infantry Regiment
  - 2nd Battalion, 13th Infantry Regiment
  - 3rd Battalion, 13th Infantry Regiment
  - 2nd Battalion, 60th Infantry Regiment
  - 3rd Battalion, 60th Infantry Regiment
  - 120th Adjutant General Battalion (Reception)
- 282nd Army Band
- 81st Readiness Division
- U.S. Army Drill Sergeant Academy
- U.S. Army Chaplain Center and School (USACHCS)
  - U.S. Army Chaplain Corps Museum
- Soldier Support Institute
  - US Army Adjutant General School
  - The U.S. Army Finance and Comptroller School
  - US Army School of Music
  - 369th AG Battalion

== Education ==
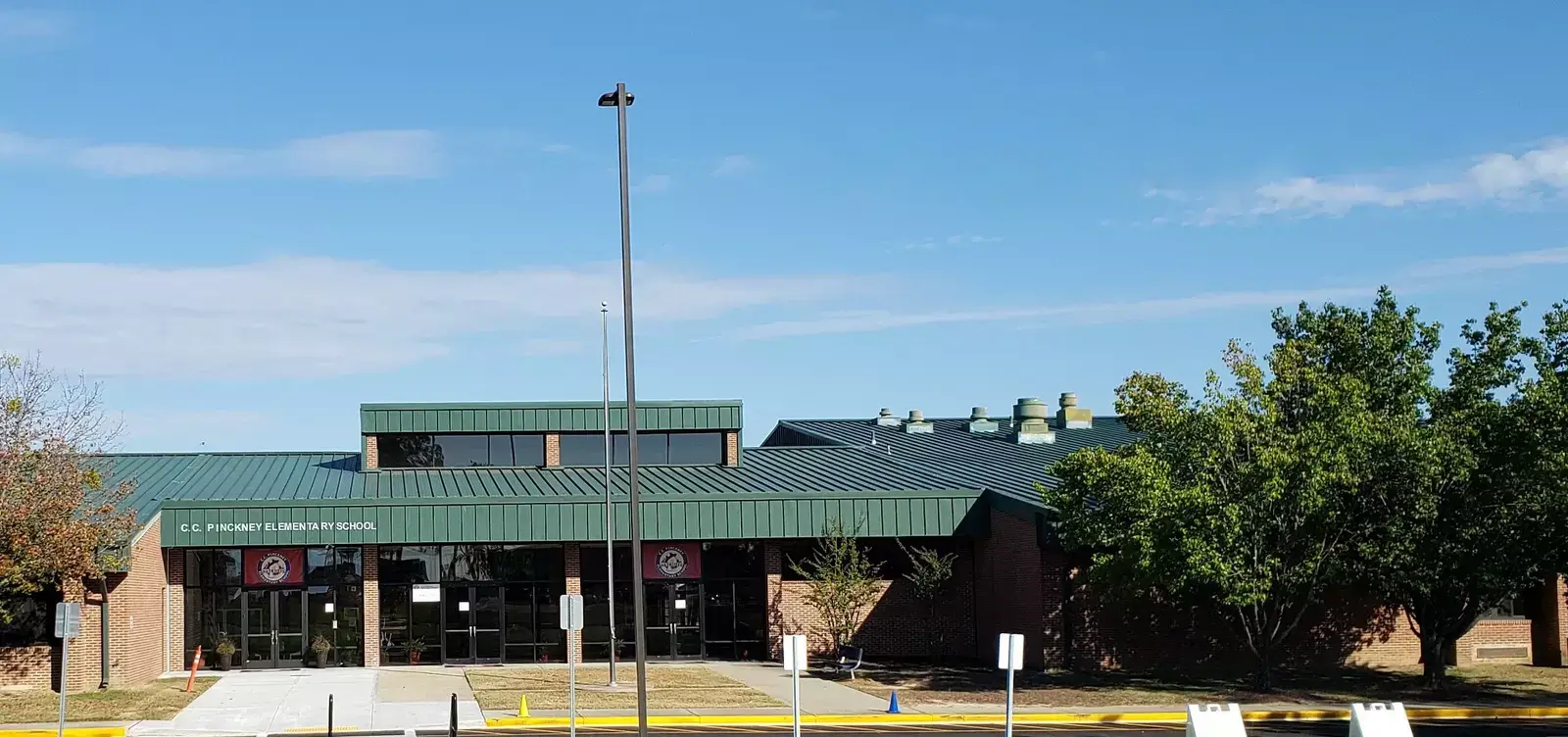
C.C. Pinckney Elementary School

Residents are zoned to Department of Defense Education Activity (DoDEA) schools for elementary school, and Richland County School District Two for secondary school. The DoDEA schools on-post are Pierce Terrace Elementary School (Pre-Kindergarten through Grade 1) and C.C. Pinckney Elementary School (grades 2–6). Students are zoned to Dent Middle School and Richland Northeast High School, which are operated by the school district.

Area tertiary schools include Midlands Technical College and Fort Jackson–based programs of University of South Carolina, Claflin University, and Webster University.

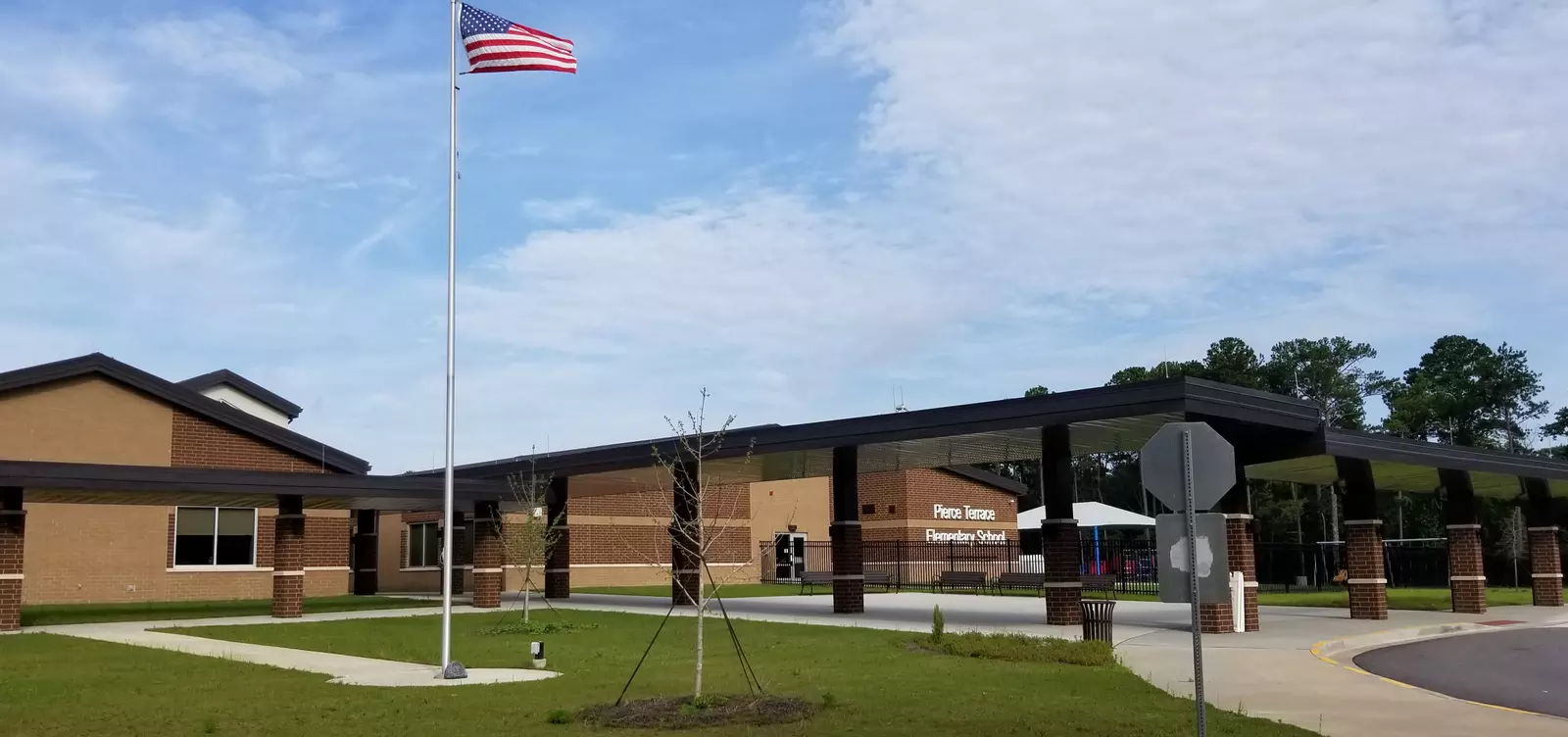
Pierce Terrace Elementary School

== Popular culture ==
Several scenes in the 1994 film Renaissance Man, set at the fictional Fort McClane, were filmed at Fort Jackson in 1993.

== Notable people ==
- Ken Berry (1953–1955), dancer, actor, singer, was corporal in the Artillery and Special Services divisions at the close of the Korean War
- Jim Cook Jr. (2013–2014), New Jersey–based journalist and playwright
- Jim Croce, singer-songwriter
- Jason Crow, Army Ranger and member of Congress
- Desmond Doss, Medal of Honor recipient
- James C. Dozier (1885–1974), served in Pancho Villa Expedition, WW1 (awarded Medal of Honor) and WW2
- Leonard Nimoy, actor, writer, film director, poet, musician, and photographer
- Joe Plumeri, Chairman & CEO of Willis Group Holdings, and owner of the Trenton Thunder, was in the Army Reserve at Fort Jackson in 1968
- Geoff Ramsey, film producer, actor, photojournalist served in Kuwait.
- Oliver Stone, filmmaker, attended both basic and AIT at Fort Jackson before serving in Vietnam.
- Freddie Stowers (1917), among first recruits to enter training; only African-American to be awarded the Medal of Honor in WW1.
