= 404th Armed Service Forces Band =

The 404th Armed Service Forces (ASF) Band, a U.S. Army unit during World War II, was the first and only all-black all-female band in U.S. military history.

== History ==
The Women's Army Auxiliary Corps (WAAC) was established in May, 1942, and began recruiting women with a 10% quota for black women. The WAAC was made part of the regular Army and redesignated Women's Army Corps (WAC) in July, 1943.

At Fort Des Moines, the first WAAC Training Center and Officer Candidate School, the barracks, service clubs, and mess halls were segregated, as was the service band. When the black women at Fort Des Moines were not allowed to join the all-white WAC Band (which became the 400th Armed Service Forces Band), they organized WAC Band #2.

Most of the women lacked previous band experience and had limited musical training or experience. Off-duty, they took music classes at Drake University, as the Army would not send them to Army Music School. In addition, the women in WAC Band #2 were given private lessons on their instruments by some members of the all white 400th Army Forces Band. After regular and frequent rehearsals, the women assigned to the band provided concerts on base, and performed in the 1944 Memorial Day Parade in Des Moines. The two women's bands coordinated their schedules, so that a band was always available on base.

WAC Band #2 was deactivated in July, 1944, when the War Department decided that there were too many bands on some posts. A massive letter-writing campaign began protesting the deactivation of band, both from individuals, such as Mary McLeod Bethune, and organizations such as the National Council of Negro Women, the Racial Justice Committee of the Des Moines Interracial Commission, and Local 208 of the Musicians' Protective Union. The post commander recognized the blow to morale among black troops caused by the deactivation of the band, and recommended that the band be retained. As a result of the public protest and the commander's recommendation, the band was reactivated in September, 1944 as the 404th ASF Band.

In addition to concerts on base, the band performed throughout the Midwest, appearing at bond drives and recruiting rallies. They were invited to perform at the Thirty-fourth Annual Conference of the NAACP in Chicago, and were credited with helping to sell over $450,000 of war bonds at the event. The 404th ASF Band was also part of the Mighty Seventh War Bond Drive in Chicago, May through June 1945, which brought in over $26 billion for the war.

The 404th ASF Band became the 404th Army Band before the end of the war, and was deactivated permanently in December, 1945.
