= Military Intelligence Corps Band =

United States Army military band

62nd Army Band
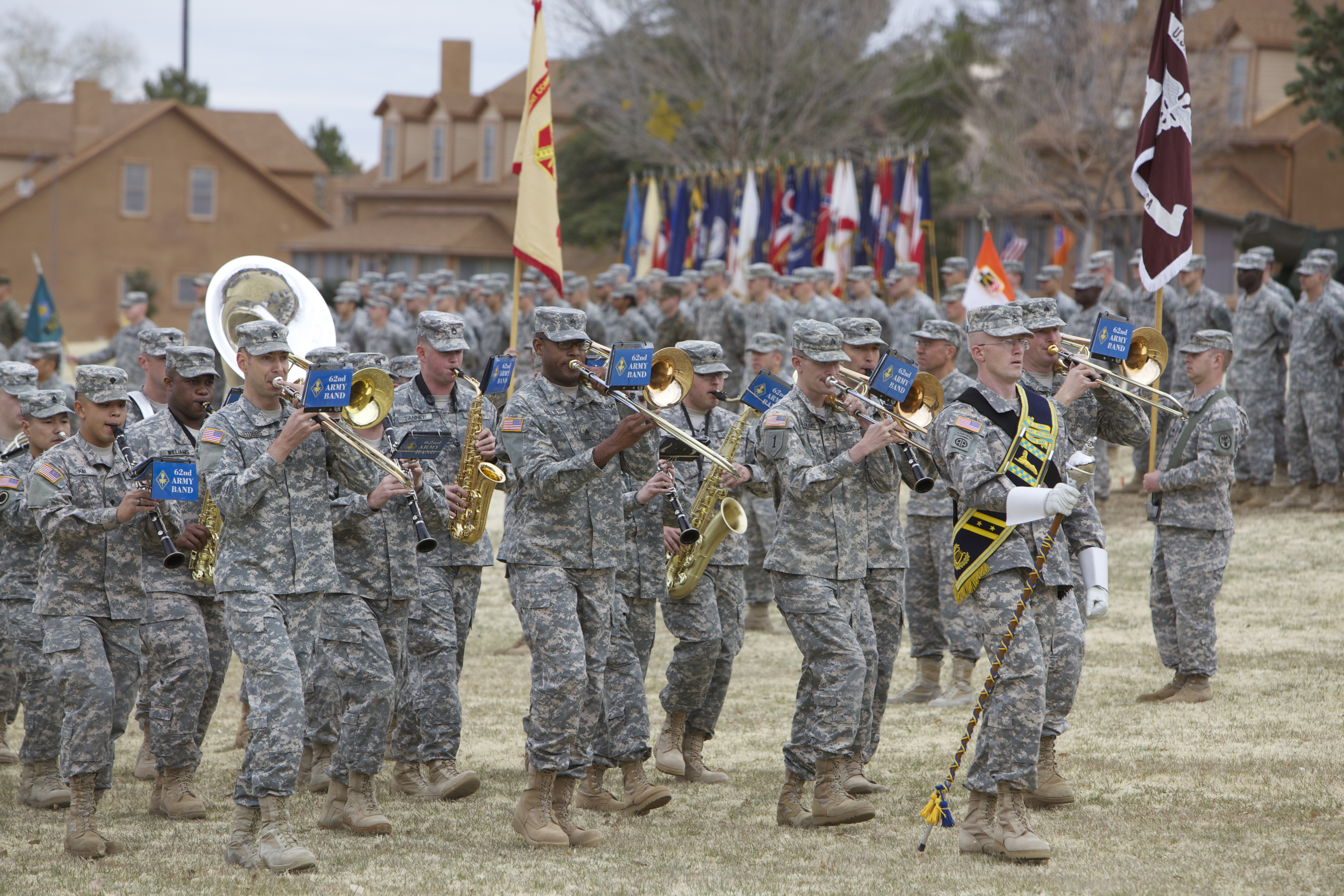
- The Military Intelligence Corps Band pictured in 2013
- Active: 1901–1921, 1942–2018
- Country: United States
- Branch: United States Army
- Type: Military band
- Role: Public duties
- Part of: United States Army Intelligence Center of Excellence
- Final post: Fort Huachuca, Arizona
- Nickname(s): Military Intelligence Corps Band
- Engagements: Philippine Insurrection; World War I
- Decorations: Army Superior Unit Award (2008)

Insignia
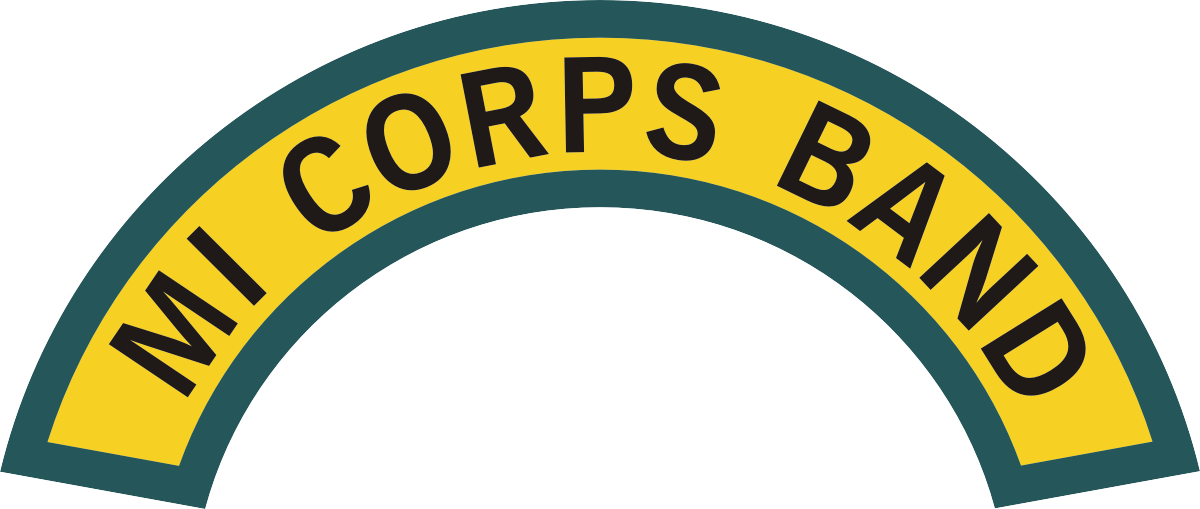
- Tab

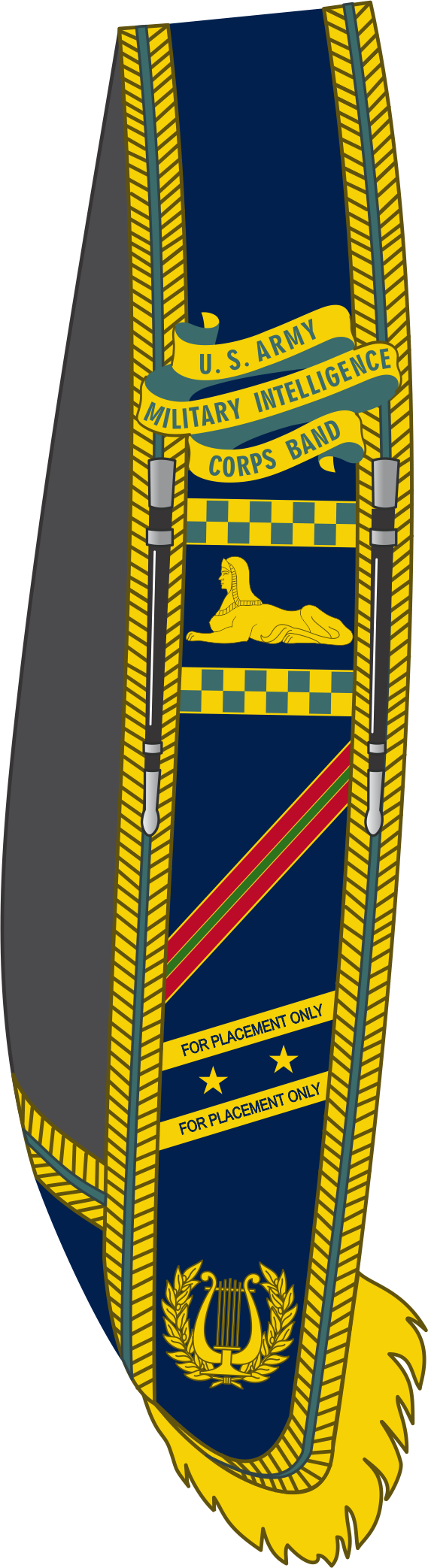
- Baldric

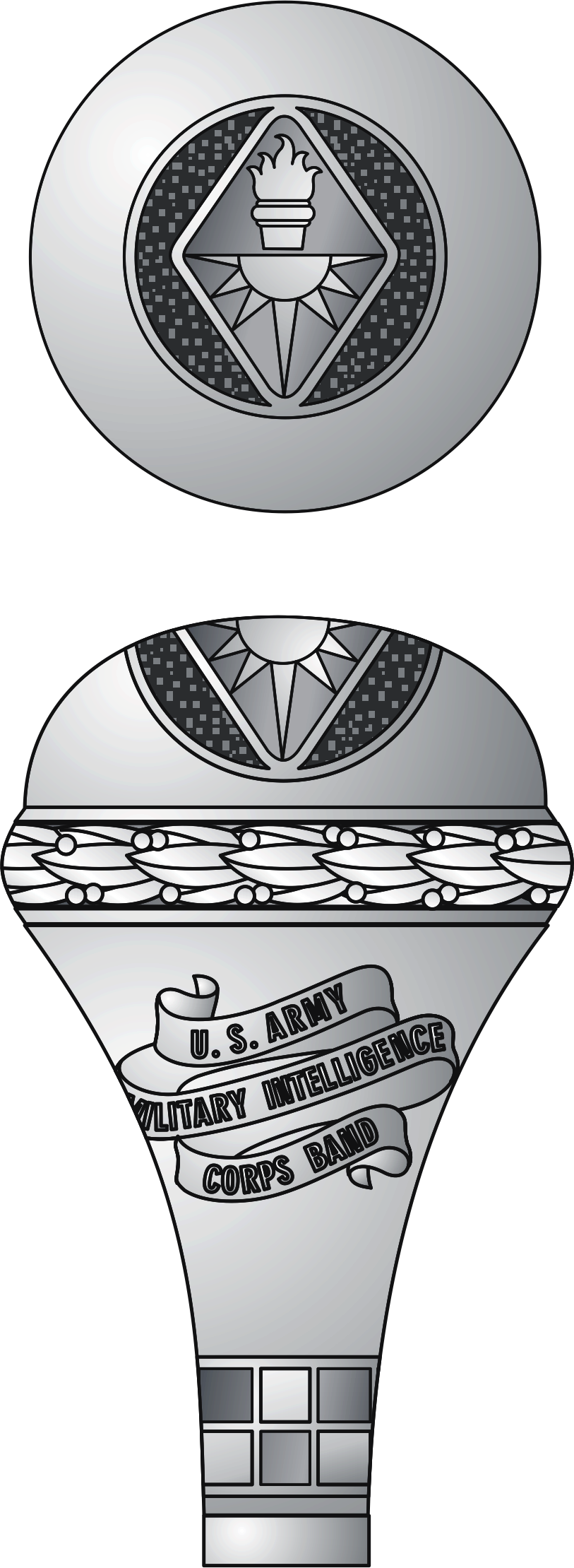
- Mace

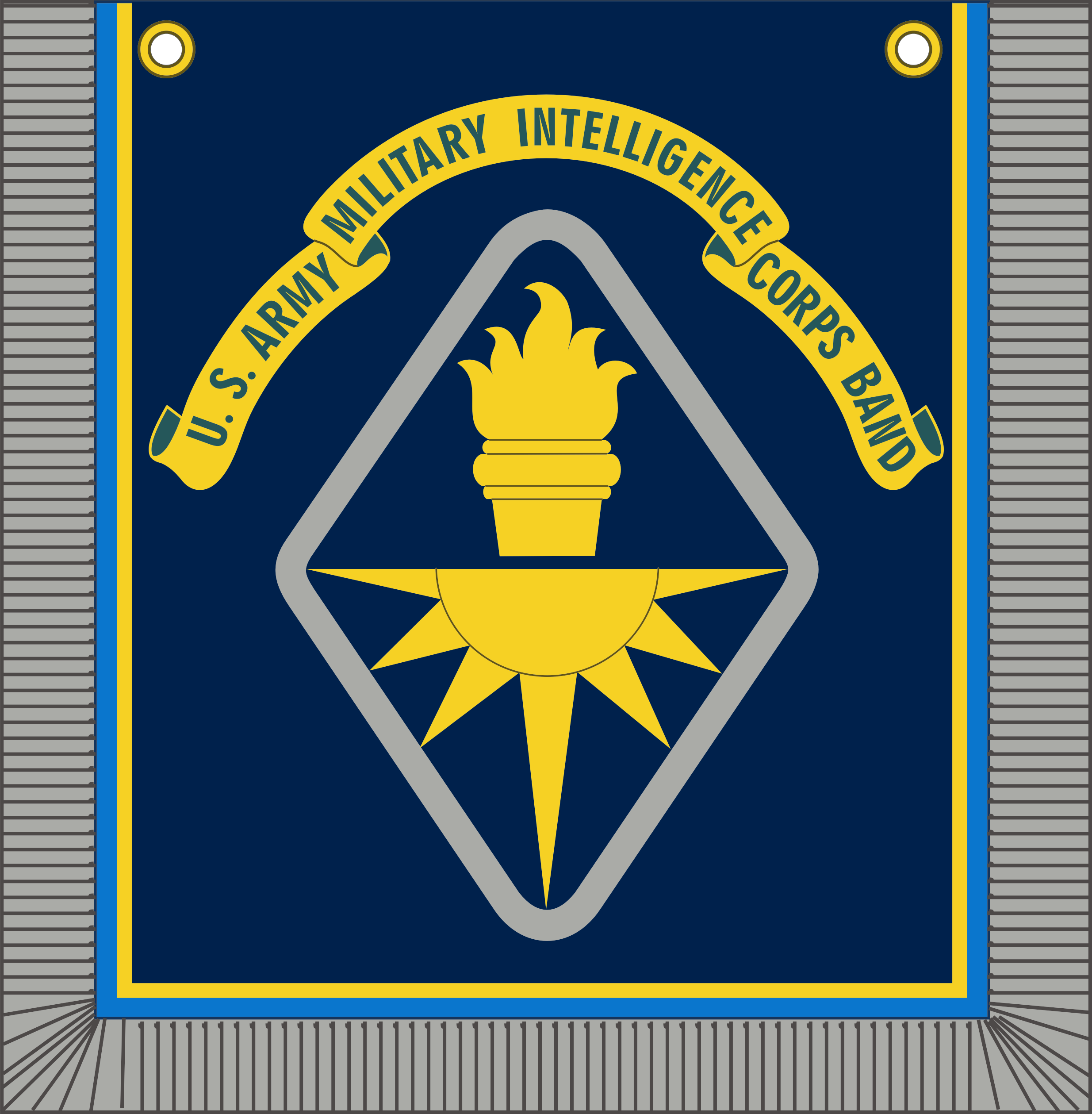
- Tabard

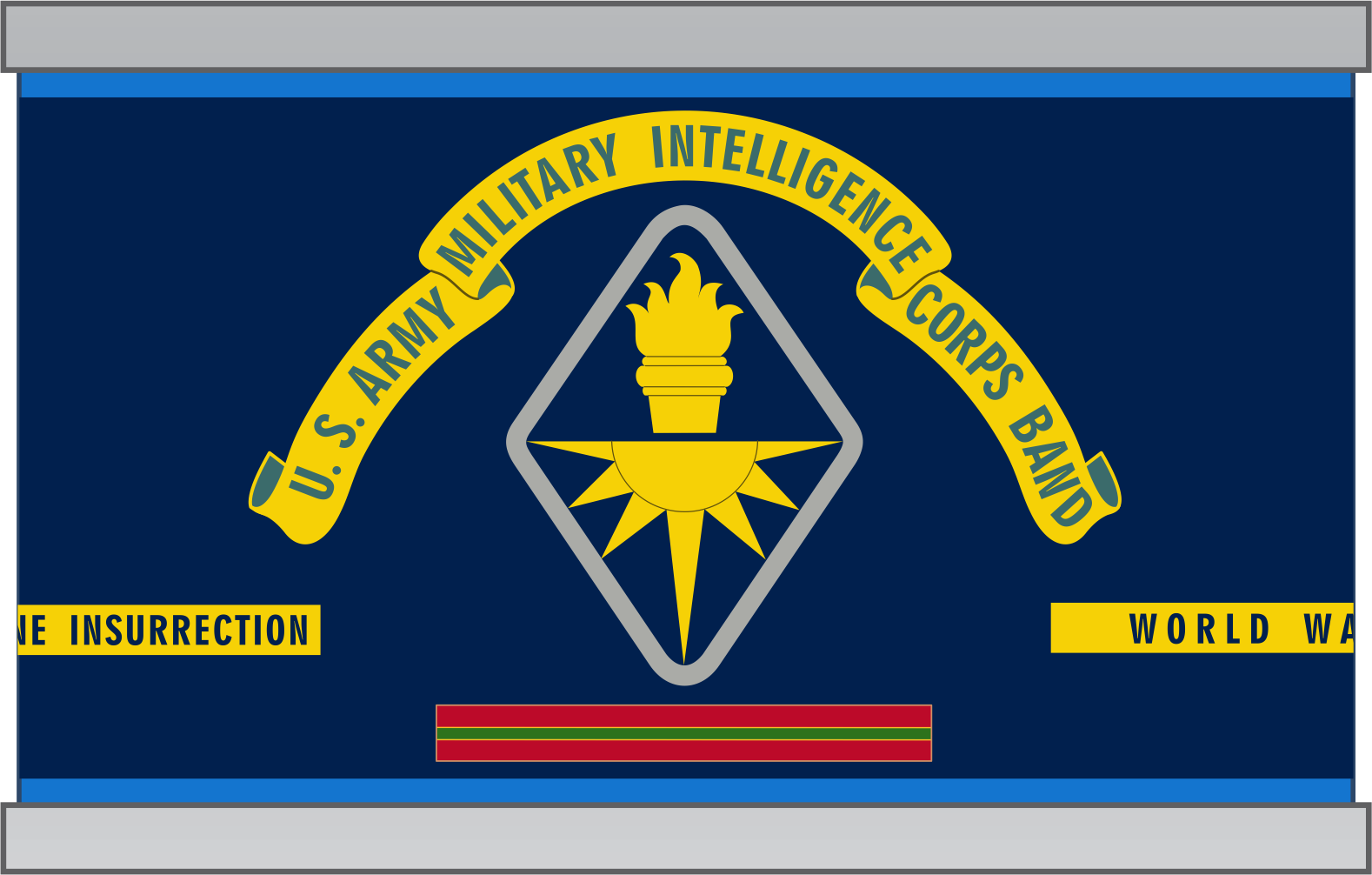
- Drum

The Military Intelligence Corps Band (officially, the 62nd Army Band) was a military band maintained by the United States Army and associated with the Military Intelligence Corps. Established in 1901 as the band of the 15th Cavalry Regiment, it was inactivated in 1921, reactivated in 1942, and inactivated a final time in 2018.

== History ==
The band was activated in February 1901 at the Presidio of San Francisco as the band of the 15th Cavalry Regiment. The band stood-down at Fort D. A. Russell, Wyoming on October 18, 1921, upon the inactivation of the 15th Cavalry. With the outbreak of World War II, it was reactivated with its regiment at Fort Riley, Kansas. On June 2, 1944, it was reorganized and redesignated as the 62nd Army Ground Forces Band and, in 1947, as the 62nd Army Band. In 2008 it received the Superior Unit Award.

In 2011 the band was assigned to Fort Huachuca, Arizona. It was inactivated in 2018 and concluded its tour with a concert to which personnel formerly assigned to the band, as well as those assigned to bands that had previously been posted to Fort Huachuca, were invited to join or attend. The band's final performance was the national march of the United States, "The Stars and Stripes Forever", which was conducted by the commanding general of Fort Huachuca, Major General Robert P. Walters, Jr. Following the conclusion of the concert its colors were cased and sent to the Center for Military History for storage. At the time of its inactivation, it was the only active-duty military band in Arizona.

== Organization ==
At the time of its inactivation, the band was authorized 37 personnel. It consisted of a ceremonial band and a chamber jazz group known as the Cannonball Combo, the latter named in tribute to Cannonball Adderley who was once posted to Fort Huachuca as a trumpet player in the 36th Army Band. By the time of its inactivation, it was estimated to have a maximum of 27 personnel.

== See also ==
- Signal Corps Band
- U.S. Army Band
