= 338th Army Band (United States) =

The 338th Army Band is a United States Army Reserve military band stationed in Whitehall, Ohio and Livonia, Michigan. The unit is assigned to the 88th Readiness Division. Its musicians support military ceremonies, public concerts, parades, commemorations and community events. The unit performs as a concert and ceremonial band and through smaller ensembles covering jazz, rock, country, brass and woodwind music.

The band's lineage dates to January 15, 1944. After its initial period of active service during World War II, it was inactivated in 1946 and activated in the Organized Reserve Corps at Columbus, Ohio in 1952.

The 338th Army Band in Cincinnati's Findlay Market Opening Day Parade, March 26, 2026.

== History ==
=== World War II ===
The 338th Army Band was constituted in the Army of the United States on January 15, 1944, and activated on February 9, 1944, at Camp Sibert, Alabama. It was redesignated the 338th Army Service Forces Band on March 15, 1944. The unit was inactivated on February 15, 1946, at Fort Sam Houston, Texas.

=== Army Reserve service ===
The unit was redesignated the 338th Army Band on May 17, 1947. It was allotted to the Organized Reserve Corps on May 15, 1952, and activated at Columbus, Ohio, on June 1, 1952. The Organized Reserve Corps was redesignated the Army Reserve on July 9, 1952.

The band's published unit history places it under the Second United States Army and subsequently XX Corps of the First United States Army. In 1967, it was reassigned to the 83rd Army Reserve Command at Fort Hayes in Columbus. The unit history records a transfer to the 88th Reserve Support Command in September 1995 and an assignment to the 310th Sustainment Command (Expeditionary) in October 2007. The Army's formal lineage record dates its location change to Whitehall, Ohio, to August 5, 1996.

By 2012, Army reporting described the band as an Ohio- and Michigan-based organization belonging to the 88th Regional Support Command, with a role supporting U.S. Army Reserve Command events. Later Army reporting identifies its parent organization as the 88th Readiness Division.

=== Livonia detachment and the 70th Division Band ===
The 338th Army Band's connection to Livonia, Michigan, grew through musicians who had served with the 70th Division Band. In 2002, former members of the Livonia-based band joined the 338th as its first detachment, continuing their service in Michigan as part of the Ohio-based unit.

The 70th brought a history stretching back to January 18, 1943. During World War II, the band earned campaign credit for the Rhineland, Ardennes-Alsace and Central Europe.

When the 70th Division was inactivated in Michigan in 1996, its band remained in Livonia. The division's history described the coming reassignment as the start of a new chapter for the musicians. In April 2002, the 70th Division Band was reconstituted under the 70th Regional Support Command at Fort Lawton, Washington, where it began recruiting musicians for a 41-member band.

By 2006, the 338th listed both Whitehall and Livonia as its stations, drawing musicians from Ohio, Michigan and Kentucky. The Washington-based 70th Army Band continued separately until 2008. It retired its guidon on September 7 and was inactivated on September 15.

== Organization and musical activities ==
The 338th provides music for military and civilian audiences in Ohio, Michigan and other locations. Its work includes concerts, parades, changes of command, veterans' events, military funerals and presidential commemorations. Smaller music performance teams allow the unit to support different venues and musical styles. During its 2015 annual training in Hawaii, several teams performed at multiple locations, including military ceremonies and public concerts.

=== Ensembles ===
The band's documented ensembles and performance configurations include the following. Names and configurations have varied over its history.

Ensemble or configuration	Musical role and documentation
Concert Band	Full-band concert repertoire, including patriotic and traditional band music; documented in Army reporting in 2012 and at Snowfest in 2025.
Ceremonial or drill band	Music for ceremonies, parades and military formations. Army reporting used the term "drill band" in 2012.
Jazz Band and jazz combos	Jazz repertoire in larger and smaller configurations. The unit's website lists jazz combos among its offerings.
Brass Quintet	Chamber music, concerts and ceremonial support; documented at the Hale Koa in Waikiki in 2015 and in reporting about an Italian visit in 2023.
Woodwind Quintet	Chamber ensemble documented during the band's 2015 Hawaii training.
Mandatory Fun	Rock ensemble documented at Zehnder's Snowfest on February 1, 2025.
Strong Winds	Brass-and-wind ensemble identified in Army coverage of Snowfest in 2025.
Work Order	Performance team specializing in Dixieland, blues and brass-band music; advertised by the Johnny Appleseed Metropolitan Park District for its 2026 Apple Festival.
Camouflage	Country ensemble documented at the Manistee National Forest Festival in 2023 and Snowfest in 2025.
Cover Down	Rock performance team named in coverage of the band's 2015 Hawaii training.
Thunderbolt Stage Band	Named in the Army's 2012 description of the unit's ensembles.
Generations Pop Group	Pop ensemble named in the Army's 2012 description of the unit.
Ska ensemble	Historical configuration described by band member Kevin Bays in his published account of service with the 338th.
Saxophone quartet	Small ensemble also documented in Bays's account.

Officer	Service with the band
Chief Warrant Officer 4 Frank C. Cleveland Jr.	Served as bandmaster and commander at Fort Hayes in Columbus.
Chief Warrant Officer 4 Martin Marks	Led the band at the U.S. Army Reserve Command change of command on June 9, 2012.
Chief Warrant Officer 4 Ronald S. Kuntz	Directed musical training during the band's 2015 Hawaii tour and served as commander in 2018, including its appearance at the 1st Armored Division change of command at Fort Bliss.
Chief Warrant Officer 4 Teresa Hudson	Conducted the band's 2019 Memorial Day concert in Blue Ash, Ohio, and served as commander in 2023 and 2025.

== Performances ==
The 338th Army Band regularly performs at military ceremonies, commemorations, public concerts, parades, festivals and sporting events. These missions involve both the full band and smaller ensembles, with engagements throughout Ohio and Michigan, elsewhere in the United States and overseas. The following appearances illustrate the range of the band's continuing work.

=== Military ceremonies and commemorations ===
Changes of command and other military ceremonies are a regular part of the band's mission. On June 9, 2012, the band performed under Martin Marks at the U.S. Army Reserve Command change of command at Fort Bragg, North Carolina, where Lt. Gen. Jeffrey W. Talley succeeded Lt. Gen. Jack C. Stultz. The band also supported the 1st Armored Division change of command at Fort Bliss, Texas, on July 12, 2018, under Ronald S. Kuntz. On April 12, 2026, it provided ceremonial music for the inactivation of the 648th Regional Support Group in Granite City, Illinois.

The band's musicians also provide honors at presidential commemorations and veterans' observances. Sgt. Marty Maggart played taps at the William McKinley commemorative ceremony in Canton, Ohio, on January 25, 2020. Andrew Neer performed the same duty at the annual observance of McKinley's birthday in January 2024.

Other commemorative appearances have included Greatest Generation Night at Detroit's Comerica Park on September 16, 2009, when Sgt. Joel Wiseman joined a Navy musician to play echo taps, and Veterans Day observances at the National Veterans Memorial and Museum in Columbus on November 11, 2021, where the band performed an armed forces medley.

=== Community concerts, parades and festivals ===
Public concerts and parades bring the band and its smaller ensembles into communities across the region. These engagements often combine several kinds of performances during the same visit. In Blue Ash, Ohio, the band presented a Memorial Day concert conducted by Teresa Hudson on May 26, 2019, and marched in the community's Memorial Day parade the following day. At the Manistee National Forest Festival on July 4, 2023, it marched in the parade and performed at VFW Walsh Post 4499, with Camouflage and Strong Winds among the participating ensembles.

The band has taken part in Cincinnati's Findlay Market Opening Day celebrations over multiple years. It was included in the 2015 parade lineup and marched in the 107th Findlay Market Opening Day Parade on March 26, 2026.

Zehnder's Snowfest in Frankenmuth, Michigan, has also featured the band across multiple years. The 338th was part of the announced 2022 program, while its 2025 appearances included Camouflage on January 31 and Mandatory Fun and the Concert Band on February 1. Strong Winds also performed during the festival.

The band's public engagements have included the Army Reserve Mega Event in Whitehall, Ohio, on June 22, 2013, and a scheduled appearance at the Columbus Jazz & Rib Fest on July 22, 2023. The festival's published lineup included the 338th, with the local music calendar placing it on the West Bank stage.

On May 20, 2025, musicians from the 338th and the 208th Army Band joined the 100th Army Band for the Salute the Troops show at the Grand Ole Opry in Nashville, Tennessee. Together they performed the Army Song during a program celebrating the Opry's centennial and the Army's approaching 250th birthday.

Announced programs for 2026 included the Concert Band at Shelby Township Summer Fest on June 27, Work Order at the Johnny Appleseed Metropolitan Park District Apple Festival on October 3, and a full Concert Band program at Archer Auditorium in Ashland, Ohio, on November 7. Ashland University organized the latter as an America250 and Veterans Day concert with support from the National Endowment for the Arts.

=== Overseas training and international appearances ===
Overseas missions combine annual training with ceremonial support and public performances.

In July 2012, musicians from the 338th joined the 85th Army Band for overseas training in Germany, supporting the U.S. Army Europe Band and Chorus. Among them were executive officer Ronald S. Kuntz and percussionist Andrew E. Torka, who performed at the U.S. Army Garrison Stuttgart change of command on July 23.

During its Hawaii training from July 12 to 25, 2015, the band filled in for the Tropic Lightning Band at ceremonies and concerts. Its teams supported two changes of command, including one aboard USS Missouri, while the brass and woodwind quintets performed at the Hale Koa in Waikiki. The rock ensemble Cover Down also performed during the visit.

The band's overseas work has also included performances in Italy. In May 2023, the 338th provided music for the 207th Military Intelligence Brigade (Theater) change of command at Caserma Ederle in Vicenza. The brass quintet was among the band's ensembles that performed in Italy that year.

In July 2026, the band traveled to the Netherlands for musical events associated with the Nijmegen Four Days Marches. Its appearances included a jazz performance at the Pontonniersbal in Cuijk and a marching performance in Nijmegen on July 24.

== Gallery ==
The band in an Independence Day parade in Columbus, Ohio, 1986.

Sgt. Joel Wiseman and a Navy musician play echo taps at Comerica Park, 2009.

U.S. Army Reserve Command change of command at Fort Bragg, June 9, 2012.

Army Reserve Mega Event in Whitehall, Ohio, June 22, 2013.

Rutherford B. Hayes wreath-laying ceremony, October 5, 2014.

The band after its Memorial Day concert in Blue Ash, Ohio, May 26, 2019.

Teresa Hudson conducts the Blue Ash Memorial Day concert, May 26, 2019.

Sgt. Marty Maggart plays taps at the McKinley memorial ceremony, January 25, 2020.

Camouflage at Zehnder's Snowfest, January 31, 2025.

Teresa Hudson conducts the Concert Band at Snowfest, February 1, 2025.

Mandatory Fun at Snowfest, February 1, 2025.

The 100th Army Band, augmented by musicians from the 338th and 208th, at the Grand Ole Opry, May 20, 2025.

648th Regional Support Group inactivation ceremony in Granite City, Illinois, April 12, 2026.
