= 1139th Engineer Combat Group =

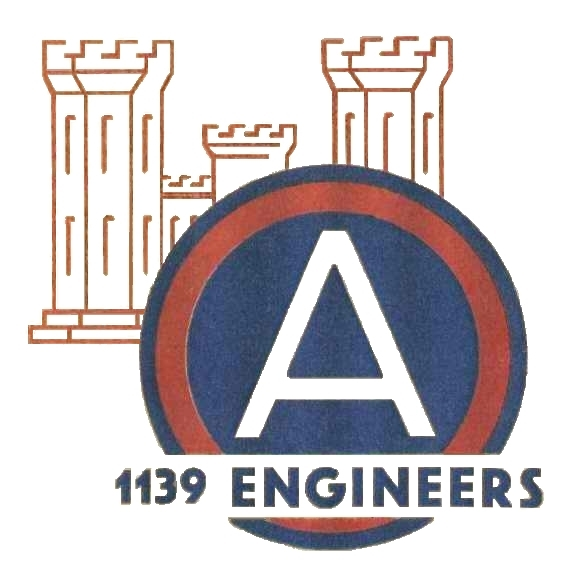
- 1139th Engineer Combat Group Logo
- Active: August 25, 1943-October 27, 1946
- Country: United States
- Allegiance: United States of America
- Branch: United States Army Corps of Engineers
- Type: Engineer Combat Group
- Role: Combat Engineering Support and Supervision
- Size: Group
- Part of: Third Army; XX Corps (United States)

Commanders
- Colonel of the Regiment: John S. Niles

Insignia
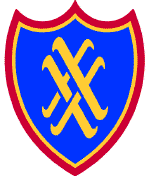
- Shoulder sleeve insignia of the XX Corps worn by the 1139th Engineer Combat Group

The 1139th Engineer Combat Group (1139th Engr C Gp) was a technical United States Army Headquarters Unit providing administration and supervision support to Combat Engineers on bridge building and other construction activities during World War II. The 1139th Engineer Combat Group was part of the Third Army and was attached for operations to the XX Corps in direct support of the 7th Armored Division. The 1139th Engineer Combat Group fought from northern France to Austria in World War II, supporting General George Patton's Third Army's rapid movements during the war.

The 1139th Engineer Combat Group is credited with opening routes for the advancement of troops which included building 119 tactical bridges, of which 39 were 200 feet or longer, including the 1,896 foot "longest floating tactical bridge constructed in the European Theater of Operations." The Group was first formed in December 1943 and deactivated in December 1946.

== Development of the Engineer Combat Group Concept ==
Starting with WWII, the United States Army defined a "group" to be similar in concept to a regiment, the unit type from which the group was evolved. In general, a regiment is composed of a fixed number of assigned battalions, whose personnel and equipment are likewise fixed. The battalions have only the minimum administrative personnel, with the result that administrative details are handled by the regimental headquarters. In warfare as mobile and on as vast a scale as the European campaign was, it was felt regiments were sometimes not sufficiently agile for achieving maximum effectiveness. Therefore, the group was designed as a flexible organization set up to efficiently meet rapidly changing tactical requirements. The group would consist of a small headquarters and a varying number of separate companies and battalions which could be attached to and detached from the group headquarters as the situation demanded.

The Engineer Combat Group had many duties: construction, repair and dismantling of various bridge types; clearing of obstacles; road repair and construction; ferrying troops in river crossings; laying smoke screens; detecting, removing, and laying of mines and demolitions, in addition to offensive and defensive infantry functions.

In the instance of the 1139th Engineer Combat Group, there were as many as five battalions and three separate companies under their command at one time, and at other times the group headquarters controlled as little as a single company. The job of the 1139th was twofold. Primarily, they were responsible for the administration of the units under their command, and secondarily, they acted in a supervisory capacity for all work assigned to the group. In addition to the combat engineer battalions, the group could have separate battalions and companies that specialized in constructing specific types of bridges such as heavy and light pontoon bridges, treadway bridges, Bailey bridges, or other specialized support functions such as area lighting or smoke generation. The units under control of the group headquarters were used to support divisions' engineer operations, providing special equipment which the division engineers did not carry, and augmenting the engineer personnel strength of the divisions' engineer battalions.

== 1139th Engineer Combat Group Training and Deployment ==
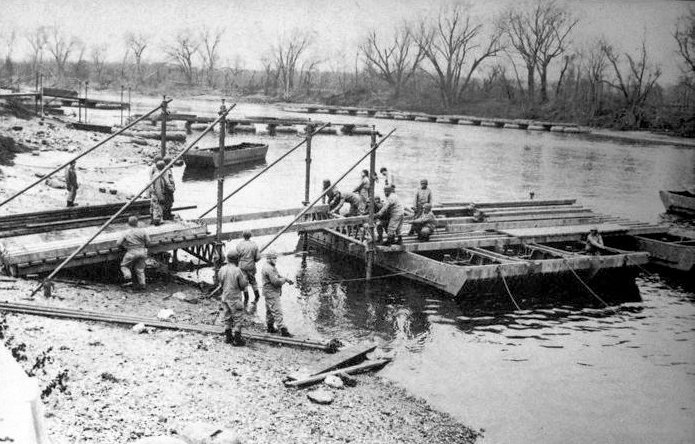
At Camp Ellis training on bridge building techniques, 1940

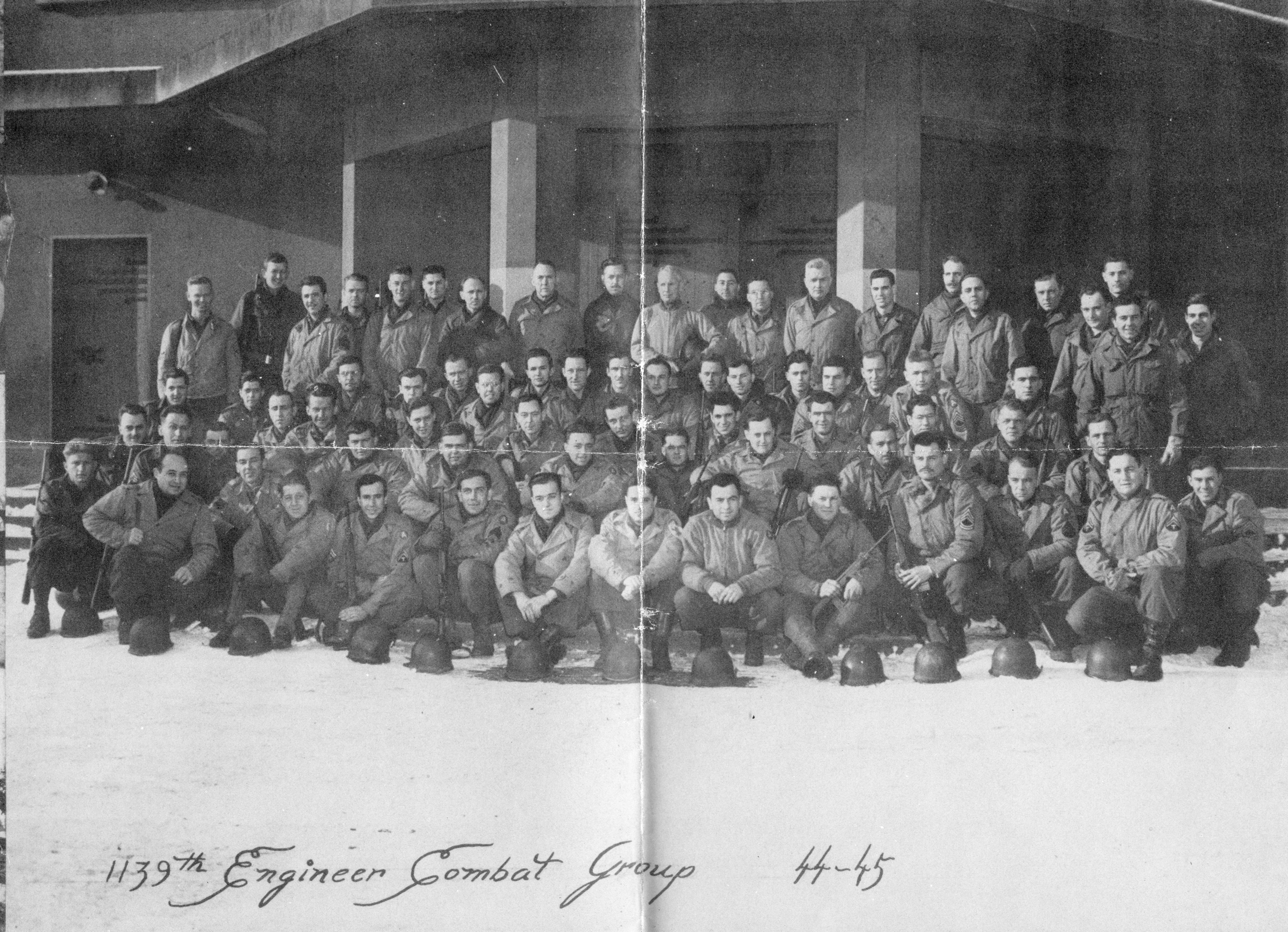
1944–1945

The 1139th Engineer Combat Group was activated on August 25, 1943, at Camp Beale, California. Many of the troops that would eventually make up the 1139th Engineer Combat Group received their initial training at Camp Ellis, Illinois, an Army Services Training Center for the Corps of Engineers located southwest of Peoria, Illinois. Most were not career soldiers, and were consigned to "the duration plus six months" of service. From there they were sent to Camp Beale, California, to join the 1139th and complete training as a unit. In addition to their basic training courses, the men of the 1139th received courses in camouflage, mine field clearing, mapping, reconnaissance, bridge building, and road construction. The 1139th was commanded by Colonel John S. Niles, with Lt. Colonel George H. Walker as the executive officer.

On July 1, 1944, the 1139th Engineer Combat Group, consisting of 16 officers and 66 enlisted men, left Camp Shanks by train to the New York Port of Embarkation and began loading on to the USAT Thomas H. Barry. Early the next morning the ship joined a convoy heading to Scotland. They arrived at the town of Greenock, Firth of Clyde, Scotland on July 12, 1944. The next day they disembarked and traveled via a twelve-hour train trip to Doddington, Nantwich, England, where they organized their men and supplies, and drew vehicles, trailers and other T/E equipment (equipment specified for their specific operations) as required.

On August 1, 1944, they traveled via truck convoy from Doddington to Bournemouth, England; a large troop marshaling area in preparation of movement to Continental Europe. On August 5, 1944, they left England sailing on the USAT George Custer and arrived on Utah Beach just two months after the D-Day landings there. Over the next two days, the unit disembarked and bivouacked in the Utah Beach area.

== The 1139th in the European Theater of Operations ==
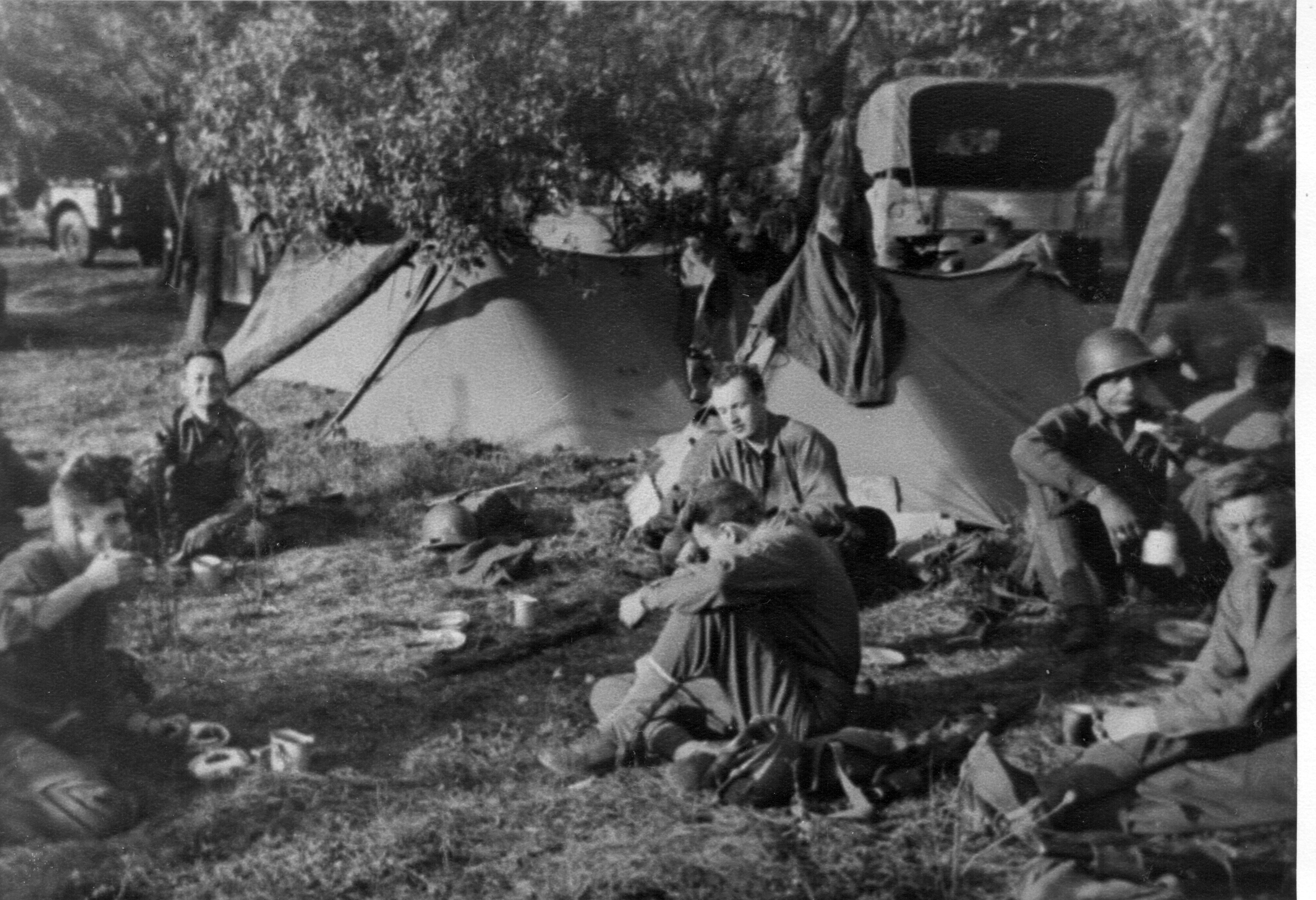
Bivouacked in France, August 1944

On August 8, 1944, they proceeded in motor convoy across the Cherbourg Peninsula moving north to Bricquebec, France, and at that point they began to work as an operational unit taking its position in the line of advance, with the First Army on its left flank and the XII Corps on the right flank. The 1139th Engineer Combat Group was assigned to the Third Army and attached for operations to the XX Corps in direct support of the 7th Armored Division. (When a unit is "assigned", it becomes a permanent part of the headquarters to which it is assigned. When the unit is "attached", it comes under the administrative and operational control of that unit to which it is attached.)

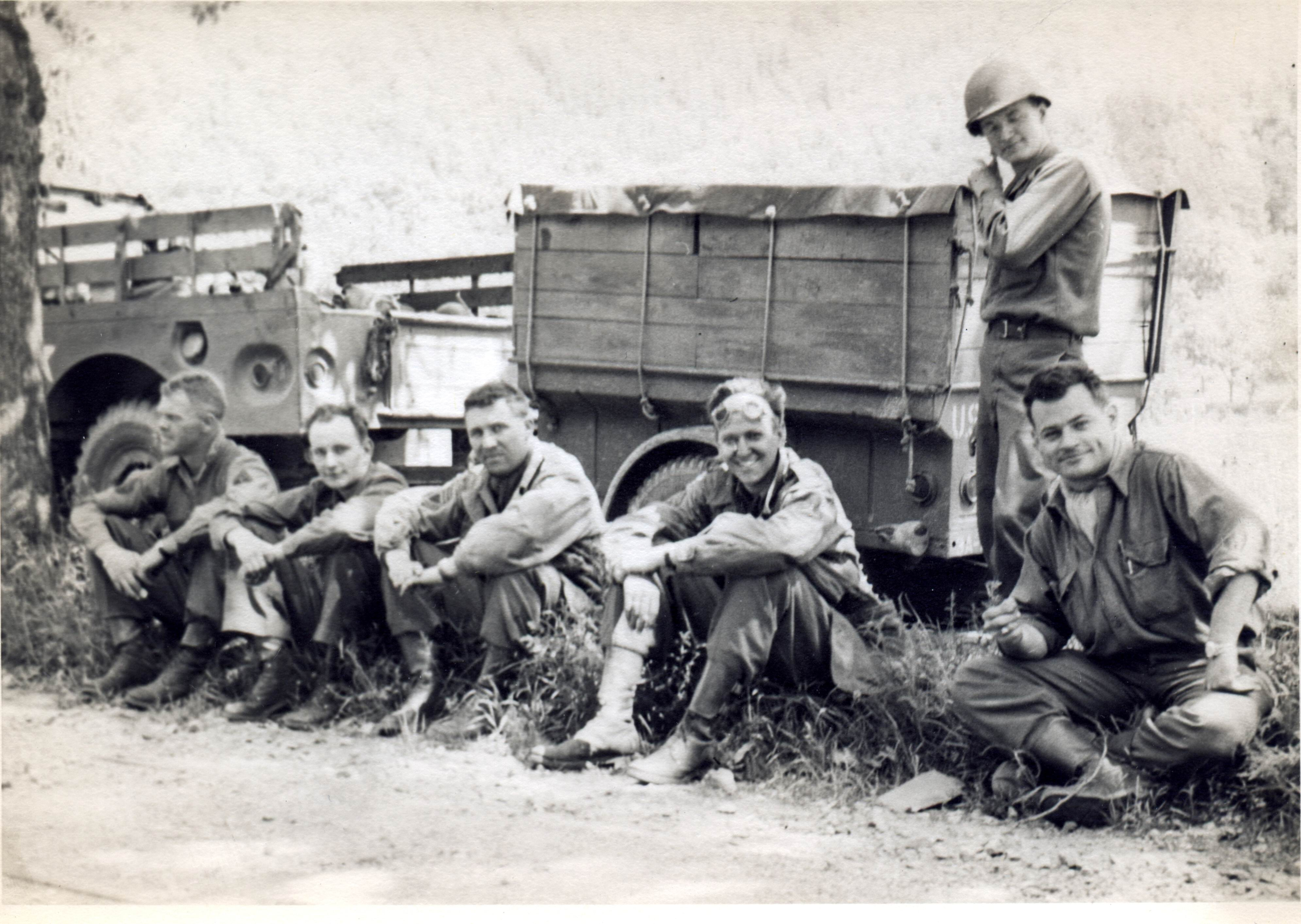
Troops on the road

It was at that point that their executive officer, Lt. Col. George H. Walker, outlined their responsibilities; as part of General Patton's army the mission of the 1139th Engineer Combat Group was to travel directly behind the armor and remove mines, build bridges, fight as infantry and perform other engineering activities that allowed the rapid advancement of the XX Corps. (The XX Corps played a measurable role in Patton's dash across France in August and early September 1944, earning the nickname "Ghost Corps" for the speed of its advance; starting in Bricquebec, France, they traveled 600 miles in their first 30 days). The XX Corps armored divisions typically traveled many miles ahead of the main body of the army, which resulted in many enemy positions being overrun before alarm could be given.

The 1139th Engineer Combat Group arrived in the vicinity of Saint Jean sur Erve, France, on August 10, 1944, and was joined by their first battalions; the 135th, the 179th, and the 206th Engineer Combat Battalions. The initial activity of the Group was to support the 80th Infantry Division in its thrust north against the enemy near Sainte-Suzanne, France.

On August 13, 1944, while en route during this advance, the Group removed landmines from roads and shoulders, and the first of the 1139th's bridges were constructed; two 60 foot Bailey bridges built at St. Mars and St. George, France, on the sites of two bridges that had been blown up by the enemy. (A Bailey Bridge is a temporary pre-fabricated, truss bridge, quickly assembled from prefabricated, standardized parts, assembled on land and then launched across an opening). Two days later they constructed two Treadway Bridges M2 across the Huisne River at La Ferté-Bernard, and at Nogent-le-Rotrou, France. (A Treadway Bridge is a floating bridge, using pontoons to support a continuous deck for pedestrian and vehicle travel). In his European campaign, General Eisenhower recognized that the Treadway bridge was an essential piece of equipment to the campaign, easy to transport, quickly installed, and capable of sustaining heavy military loads.

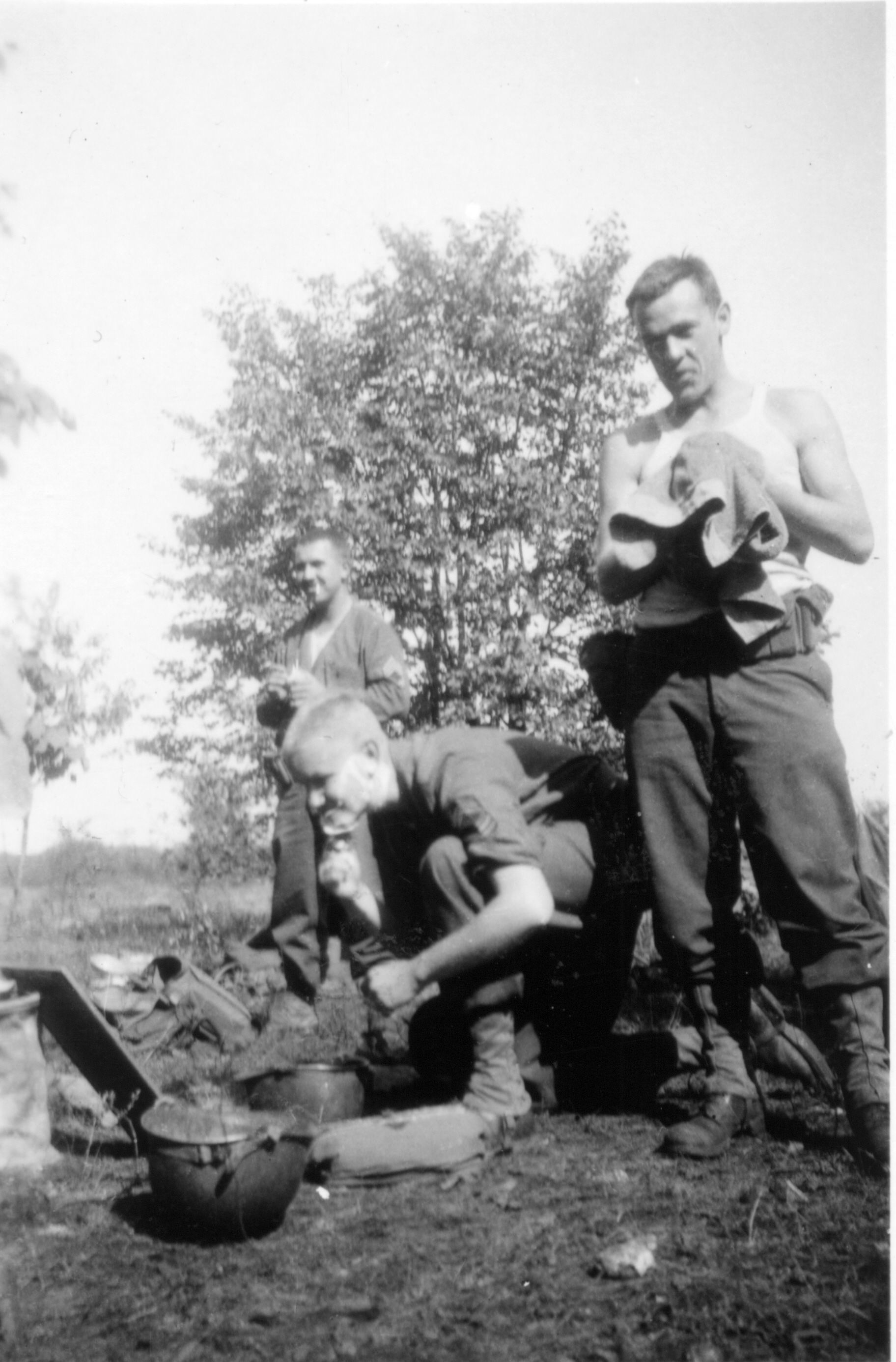
Bivouacked near Melun, France, August 23, 1944

On August 17, 1944, the 1139th meet stiff resistance as they were trying to enter Chartres, France, requiring the 1139th Engineer Combat Group to take on their infantry role. They engaged in firefight operations by cleaning out machine-gun and anti-tank gun nests in Bonville, France, suffering 6 dead and 12 wounded. They constructed two short Treadway bridges at Luce, France, west of Chartres and removed twelve large bombs from bridges in Chartres. By the next day they were joined by the 7th Armored Division, and the city was finally liberated.

The Group then moved north to the vicinity of Treon, France, in support of the 7th Armored Division. There they were tasked with clearing the roads of mines, removing booby-trapped vehicles from roads, de-booby-trapping the Railroad station at Dreux, France, and filling in road craters in the routes of the advancement. They continued to move rapidly forward, and the Seine River was reached on August 23, 1944, where they bivouacked in an open field near Melun, France. At Sainte Sauveur, the 1139th Engineer Combat Group supported the 7th Armored Division in its initial crossing of the Seine River at Tilly by manning assault boats, by establishing a beachhead and constructing a 504-foot Treadway Bridge while under direct fire, and by constructing a 204-foot footbridge across the canal at Melun. The construction of the foot-bridge was carried on under heavy small arms and 88mm fire. An 88mm shell blew out 50 feet of the bridge during construction, which had to be replaced while under intense enemy fire.

Over the next few days, the Seine was bridged in three more places by the 991st and the 994th Engineer Treadway Bridge Companies, the 537th Engineer Light Ponton Company, and the 135th, 179th, and 206th Engineer Combat Battalions. These crossings consisted of multiple span continuous Bailey bridges, a 210-foot Bailey at Vulaines-sur-Seine, Frances, and a 420-foot Bailey at Champagne, France. Most of the construction was carried out at night, and took place under enemy fire, resulting in several lives lost. When the bridges were completed, they were guarded and maintained while under considerable fire.

Arriving at Montmiral, France on August 28, 1944, the 1139th Engineer Combat Group underwent a leadership change with executive officer Lt. Col. Walker leaving to become the commanding officer of the 1103rd Engineer Combat Group, and Lt. Col Robert Eininger replacing him.

The next major objective of the Third Army was Verdun and the Moselle Valley, which offered a natural gap in Germany's frontier line. Early in the morning of September 2, 1944, the XX Corps arrived 5 miles west of Verdun. Within a matter of hours, the city fell to the armored division, and on September 4, 1944, the 509th Engineer Light Ponton Company had built a 200-foot Baily bridge over the Meuse River and a bridgehead was established on the eastern side of the river. At this point, the Third Army's Armored Divisions had outpaced the Redball gasoline supply column, and although emergency supply convoys were rushed south, the Germans had time to reinforce their positions at Metz, Germany. The American bridgehead had to be withdrawn from across the Meuse. While awaiting gasoline reinforcements the 1139th Engineer Combat Group completed a considerable amount of repair on the railroads in the vicinity. Repairs were made by filling in bomb craters in the yards east of Verdun, and by rehabilitation of the track and roadbed from Conflans to Verdun, France, including construction of a 280-foot single track bridge at Conflans.

On September 15, 1944, when adequate supplies had finally reached the Third Army, they moved on toward Thiacourt. The 135th Engineer Combat Battalion working with the 180th Engineer Heavy Ponton Battalion constructed a 260-foot Heavy Pontoon bridge at Pagny. Because of a shortage of Engineer troops, it was necessary to form a provisional platoon from the Group Headquarters Company to assist in the construction. Then working with the 509th Engineer Light Ponton Company, they constructed two 80 foot Bailey bridges across the Moselle River. The bridge building units worked under constant heavy mortar and artillery fire at these crossings, but were aided by the 161st Chemical Smoke Generating Company laying down a heavy smoke screen from hundreds of smoke generators and pots. The cost in lives was high, but it helped pave the way towards taking the heavily defended city of Metz. Despite the pressure of the continued rapid advance of the Group, morale among the troops remained at a high level.

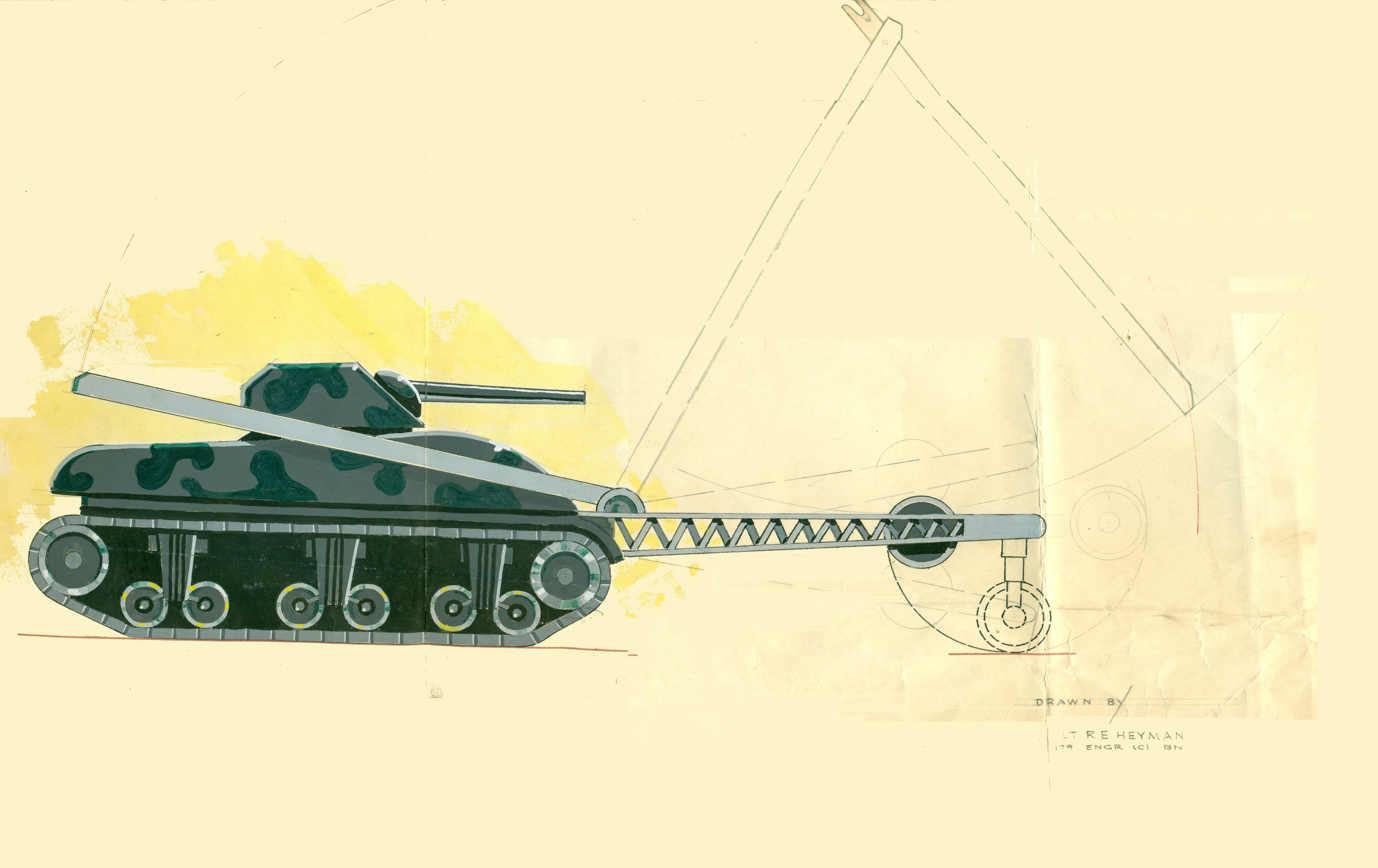
Rapid bridge-launching vehicle, designed by the 1139th Engineer Combat Group

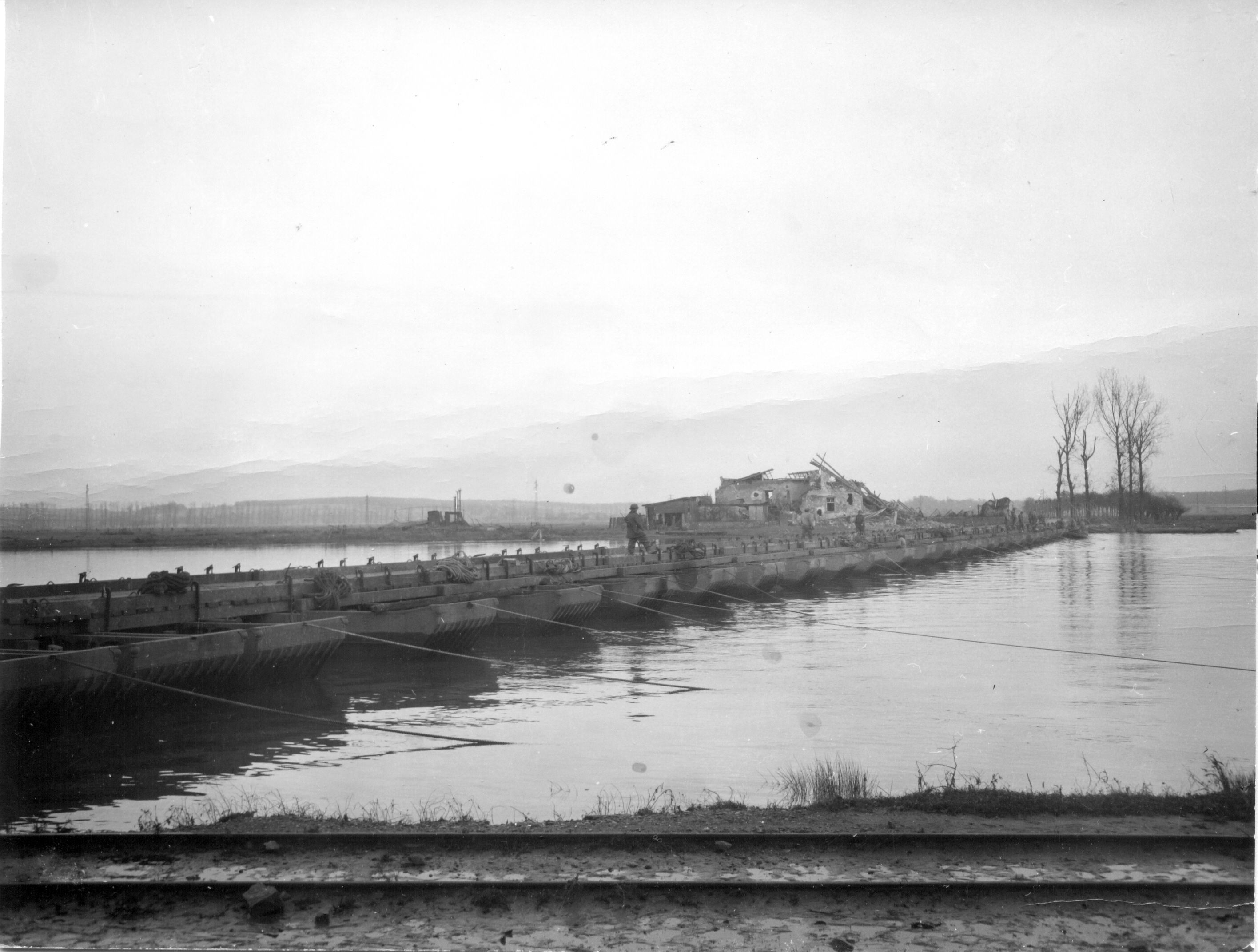
Heavy Pontoon Bridge built across the Moselle River at Uckange, France, by 1139th Engineer Combat Group, November 17, 1944

During the month of October 1944, the 1139th Engineer Combat Group grew to one of the largest tactical engineer groups in the United States Army. Over 5000 troops were under their command, including the 5th, 83rd, 90th, and 95th Infantry Divisions, the 179th and 206th Engineer Combat Battalions, the 991st Engineer Treadway Company, the 509th Engineer Light Ponton Company, and the 623rd Engineer Light Equipment Company. This concentration of men and equipment was in preparation of supporting the crossing of the Moselle River by the 10th Armored Division and the 90th and 95th Infantry Divisions. In preparation for this, the troops were instructed in crossing techniques using assault boats, and the Group experimented with building a rapid bridge-launching-device constructed on a tank frame. (While functional, this vehicle was unfortunately found to be so heavy that it was not practical to move for any real distance).

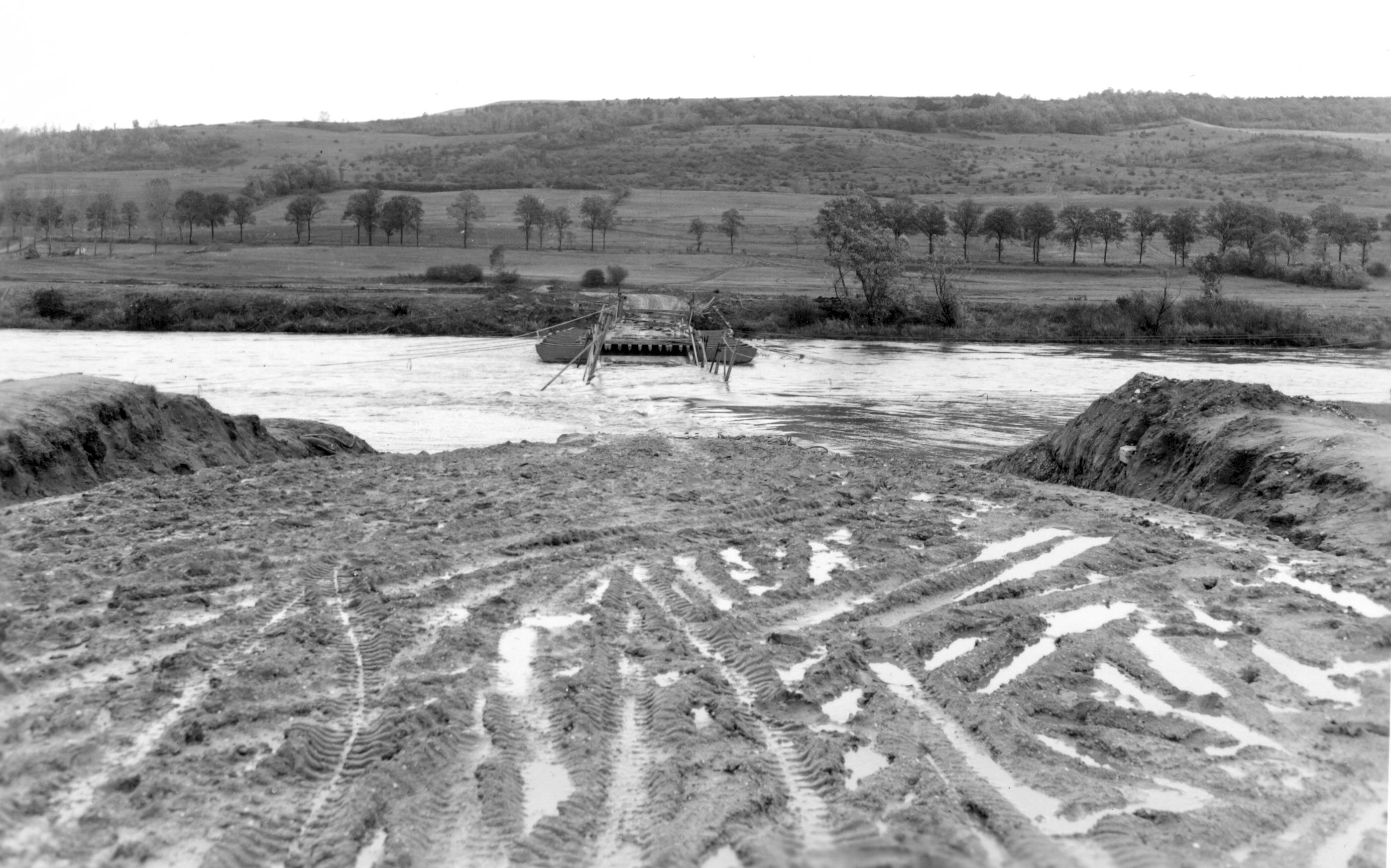
Cattennom, France, bridge lost under fire, November 1944

The month of November 1944, was of extreme importance to the XX Corps because the crossing of the Moselle River and advancement eastward depended upon the success by the 1139th Engineer Combat Group in bridging the river. Eight bridges were constructed across the Moselle River by the 1139th Engineer Combat Group during the month; two Treadway M2s of 350 and 396 feet in length, one 630 foot Treadway M1, two Floating Baileys of 530 and 440 feet in length, one Baily DS, and two Heavy Pontoon bridges of 730 and 675 feet in length. These crossings were unusually difficult because the Moselle River was in a state of 30-year flood, and the enemy was continually making the bridging difficult with heavy artillery, machine gun and small arms fire. The enemy fire at Cattenom, France, was so intense that the 440 foot Floating Bailey Bridge was eventually lost. In most of these crossings the engineers had to first resort to ferrying operations in order for the infantry to clear a beachhead on the eastern shore so that the bridges could be constructed. Numerous troop losses occurred during these crossings.

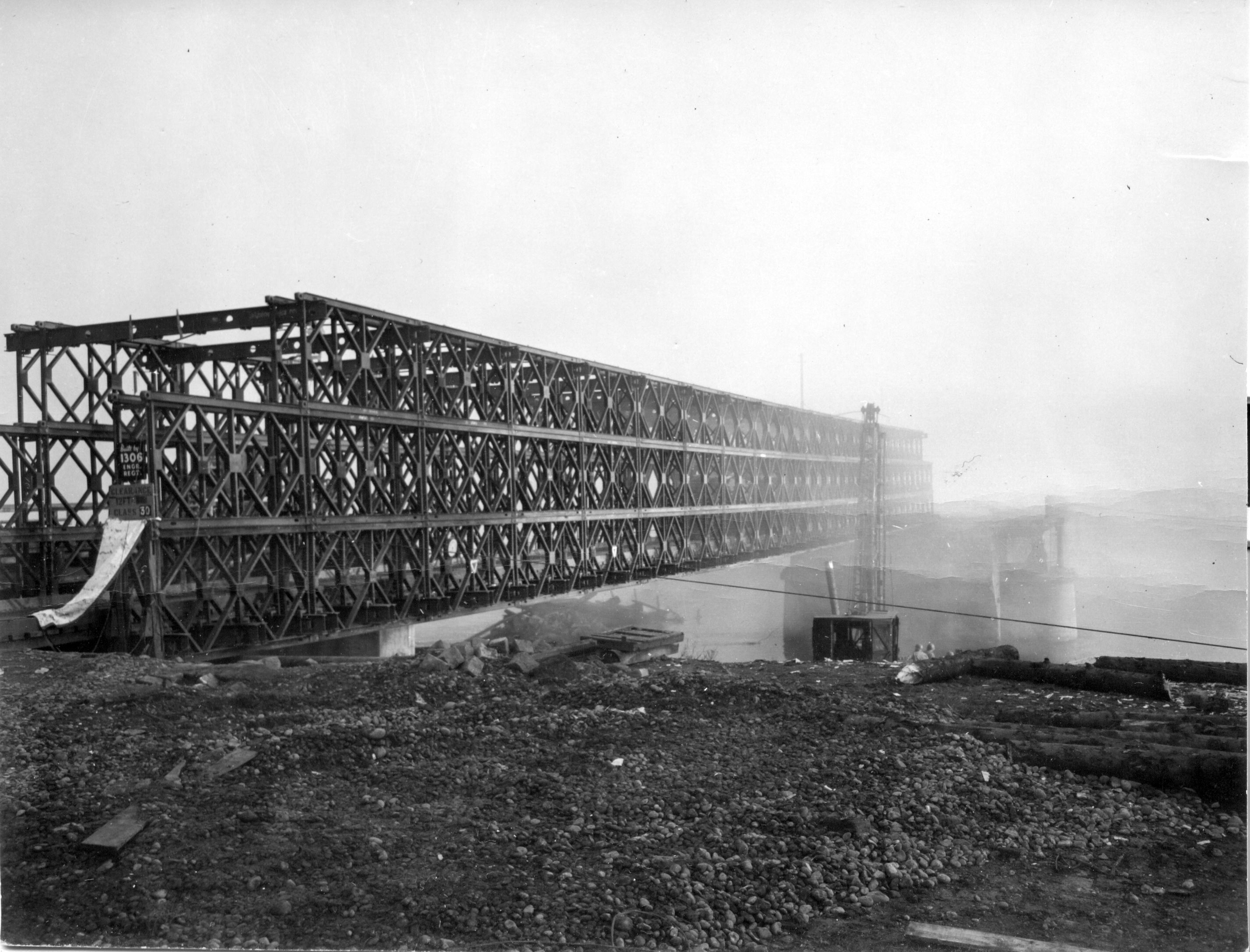
Bailey Bridge built across the Moselle River at Thionville, France by the 1139th

After the successful crossing of the Moselle River by the 90th and 95th Infantry Divisions and the 10th Armored Division, studies of aerial photographs revealed the need for all the engineers in the Group to help overcome the obstacles left by the enemy; extensive antitank ditches, craters, pill boxes, blown bridges, and numerous mine fields (one minefield alone was estimated to contain 10,000 mines). The burden of this work was so great that the 135th Engineer Combat Battalion was reattached to the 1139th Engineer Combat Group for the purpose of taking over the work in the rear of the division, including filling craters and ditches, destroying pill boxes, constructing fords, marking minefields, posting road signs, changing town signs, and removing the dead to Graves Registration. Because of the large number of bridges under construction during November, it was also necessary to utilize the 88th Engineer Heavy Ponton Bridge Battalion to haul Bailey bridges from Army Supply Point No. 8 to Thionville, France, and to maintain the Group Bridge Dump there.

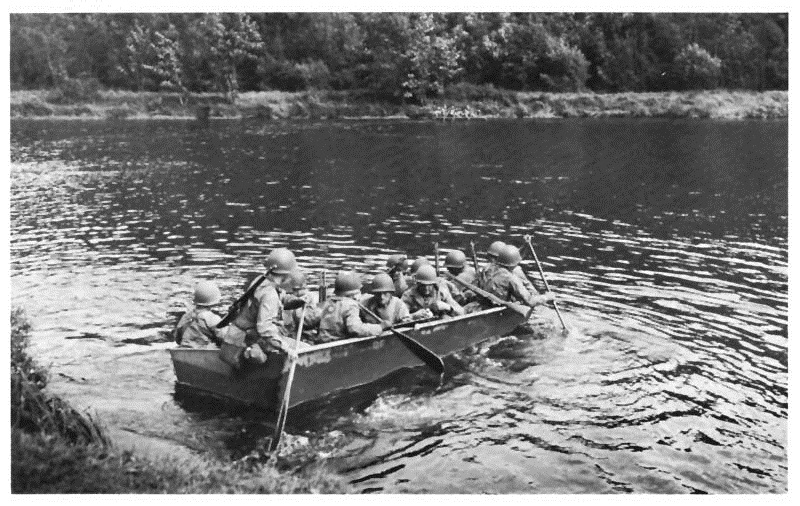
Combat engineers ferrying infantry in M2 assault boat

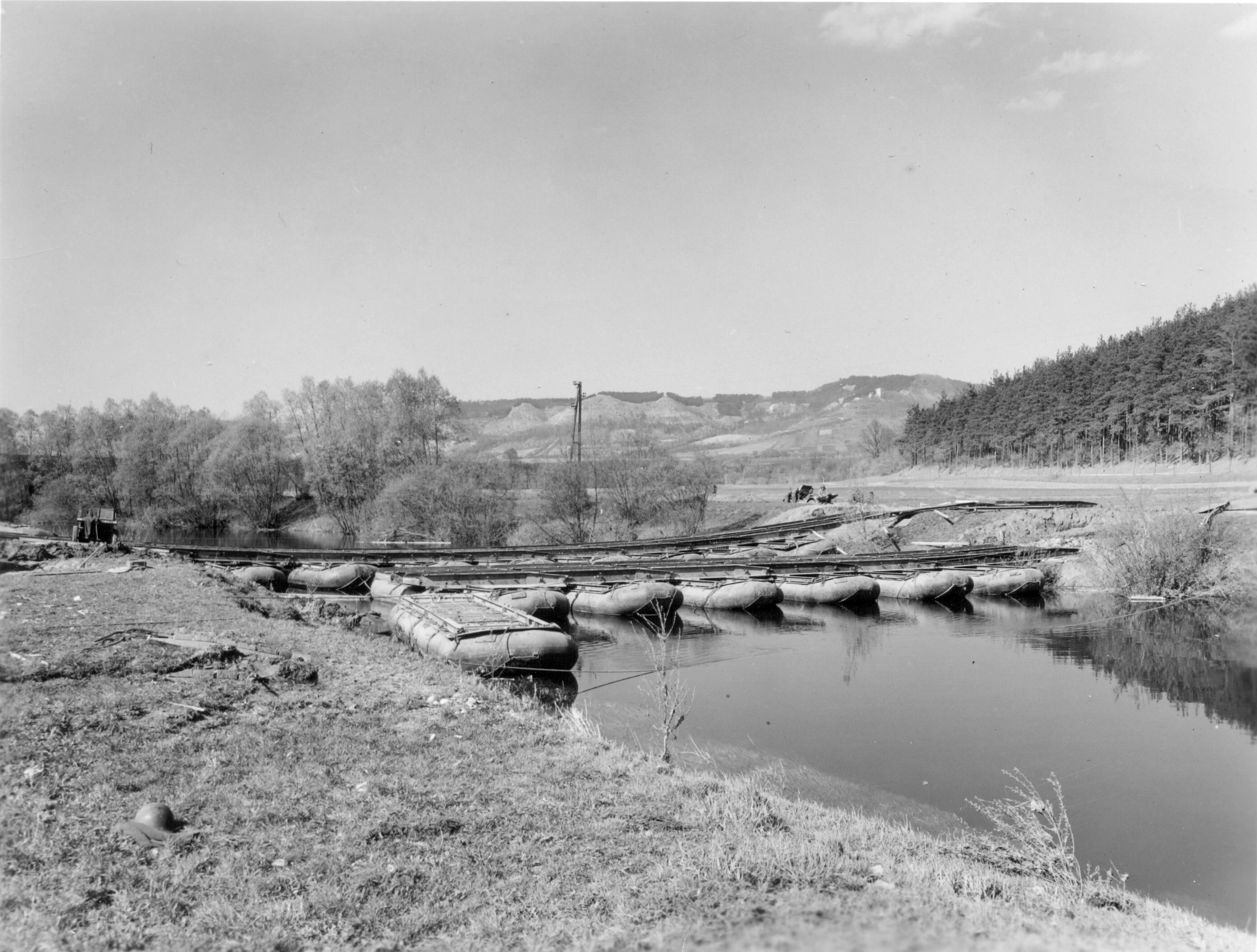
Double Treadway M1 Pontoon Bridges built by 1139th at Büren, Germany, December 11, 1944

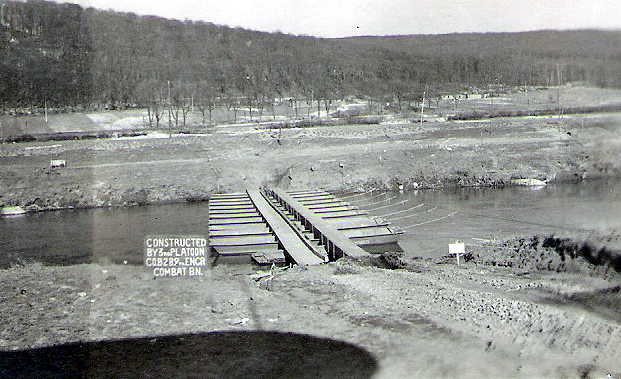
Infantry support bridge over Saar River erected by 289th Engineers at Volklingen

In December 1944, while planning the crossing of the Saar River, the 1139th Engineer Combat Group was stationed at Niedaltdorf, France. On December 6, 1944, the 90th Infantry Division, located near Wallerfangen, France, was ready to make the assault crossing. The 20th Engineer Combat Battalion began ferrying operations in Assault and storm boats. They ferried across two Battalions and part of a third battalion of the 38th Infantry Regiment, while the 179th Engineer Combat Battalion ferried the 1st and 2nd Battalions of the 357th Infantry Regiment. Following these operations the storm boats continued to evacuate wounded and to deliver supplies. Although all operations of the river were carried out under continuous heavy artillery and small arms fire day and night, there was no letup in the steady flow of materials and supplies by the storm boats. However, the incoming fire was so heavy that power boats could not be brought down to the river for launching.

After several unsuccessful attempts, a ferry was constructed on December 8, 1944, for ferrying vehicles, anti-tank guns and tanks across the river at Wallerfangen, with additional ferries at Pachten-Dillingen and Rehlingen-Siersburg, France, which made it possible to ferry all the vehicles and tanks of the 90th Infantry as rapidly as they were needed to secure a beachhead on the eastern shore. This was of importance since a floating bridge was not able to be constructed, since sections were shot away as rapidly as they were placed into the water. The Saar across from Dillingen, Germany, continued to prove difficult to cross because of heavy fire from a large number of occupied German pill boxes on the eastern side of the river where the Siegfried Line had been most heavily constructed. As a result, a bridgehead was not expanded there to any great depth, although ferrying operations continued until December 20, 1944.

These activities were interrupted as Germany made its last major offensive campaign; the Battle of the Bulge (also known as the Ardennes Counteroffensive). When General Patton learned of the attack, he quickly repositioned six full divisions of his army from their locations along the Saar River to launch a counterattack north to relieve the U.S. 101st Airborne Division which had been trapped at Bastogne. To replace the repositioned defensive divisions along the Saar River, the 90th Infantry Division withdrew from their eastern beachhead at Dillengen to join the 95th Infantry Division in defending the western side of the river. The 1139th Engineer Combat Group supported both divisions in constructing defensive barriers consisting of mine fields, roadblocks, and bridges prepared for demolition, as well as guarding many of these deterrents.

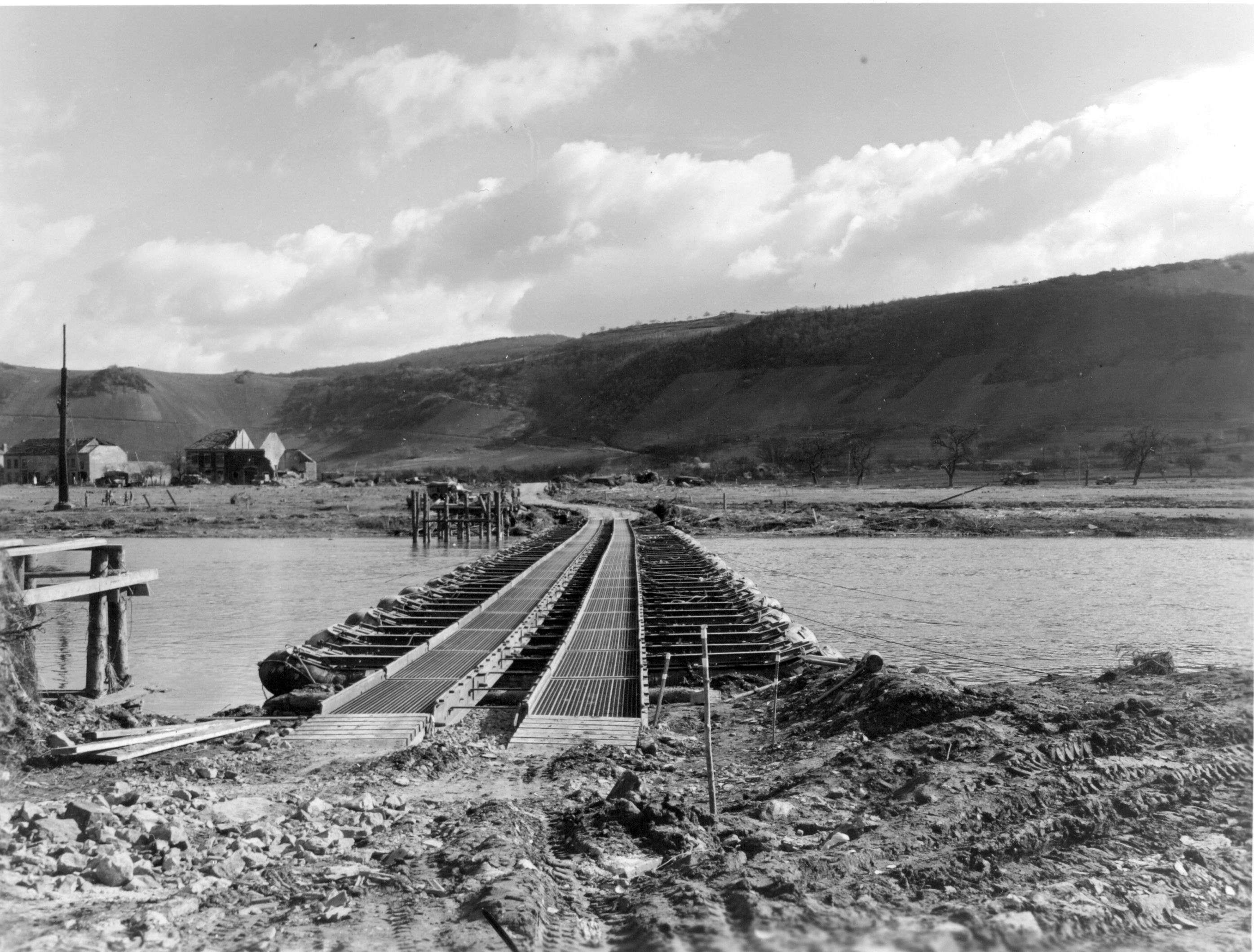
Treadway M2 Bridge built by 1139th across the Saar River at Schoden March 2, 1945

During January 1945, the 1139th Engineer Combat Group continued to support defensive operations on the west bank of the Saar River, consisting of barrier zone and roadwork maintenance, installation of an anti-mine boom at Maimühle, roadway snow-plowing and sanding, guarding displaced German citizens at Niedaltdorf, removing mines and booby traps at Thionville, and patrolling the banks of the Moselle River.

By February, the Germans were in full retreat from the Ardennes. During the first three weeks of February 1945, the 1139th Engineer Combat Group was engaged in miscellaneous engineer activities in support of the 94th Infantry Division and the 3rd Cavalry Regiment. Because of sudden thaws supplemented by heavy rains, the Moselle River was swollen to flood heights again. As a result, great ice floes were swept down the river with such force that it necessitated the removal of all floating bridges. The salvaged materials were removed and placed in the storage dumps, and as soon as possible the bridges were reconstructed to allow traffic over the Moselle again. On February 20, 1945, the 1139th Engineer Combat Group was given the mission of assisting the 94th Infantry Division in its assault crossing of the Saar River. Under heavy enemy fire coming from strategically located pill boxes on the east bank, three successful assault crossings were made between the 21st and 23 February at Taben, Serrig, and Ayl, Germany.

The first bridge crossings of the Saar River under the direction of the 1139th occurred February 24 and 26, 1945. The 135th Engineer Combat Battalion installed a 240-foot Treadway bridge at Taben, and a 286' Heavy Pontoon Bridge at Saarburg, and the 993rd Engineers Treadway Bridge Company built a 320-foot Treadway Bridge at Serrig, allowing the 94th Infantry Division to cross the Saar River and established a vital bridgehead at Serrig. This, in turn, allowed a 286-foot Heavy Pontoon bridge and a 336-foot Treadway bridge to be built across the Sarr at Niederleuken and Schoden, so that both Infantry and Armor could cross and reduce the enemy on the eastern side of the Saar. On March 6, 1945, an additional 336-foot Treadway M2 C1 bridge was then established at Konz Karthaus by the 179th and the 206th Engineer Combat Battalions.

During the first part of March 1945, the 1139th Group was engaged in engineering work necessary for the rapid advancement of the XX Corps from the Saar to the Rhine Rivers. In addition to construction of many Bailey Bridges and small fixed bridges, they were tasked with supervising civilian labor on road work, preparing gun emplacements for artillery pieces, constructing camouflage screens and anti-mine booms at bridges, removing dead animals from minefields, hauling prisoners, demolishing buildings to widen roads, painting town signs, and destroying enemy tanks and artillery pieces.

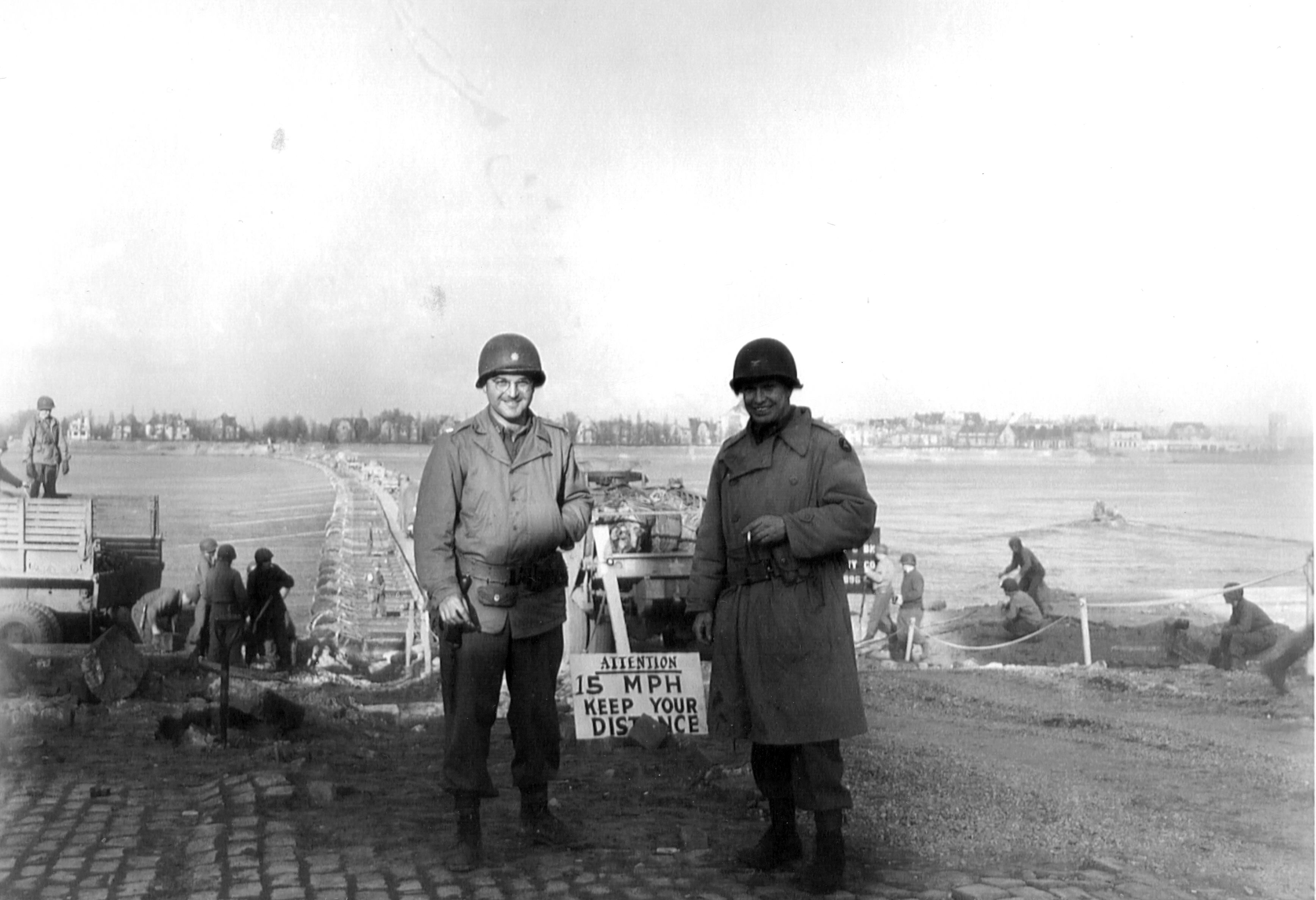
Colonel Jackson (CO 160th) and Colonel Niles (CO 1139th) at Rhine River, Mainz, April 1945

In quick secession the American Armies were converging on the enemy in the Rhine-Moselle triangle; the 4th Armored Division from the North, the 10th and 6th Armored Divisions from the South, and the 3rd and the 7th Armies from various locations. Lieutenant Colonel Omar Bradley told General George S. Patton, whose U.S. Third Army had been fighting through the Palatinate to "take the Rhine on the run." The Third Army did just that on the night of March 22, 1945, crossing the river with a hasty assault south of Mainz at Oppenheim by the 17th Armored Engineer Battalion on a 1,152 foot long Treadway M2 Bridge. It was there on March 24, 1945, that Patton showing his contempt for the enemy, made good on his pledge to "piss in the Rhine", which he did from a pontoon bridge in full view of his men and news cameras.

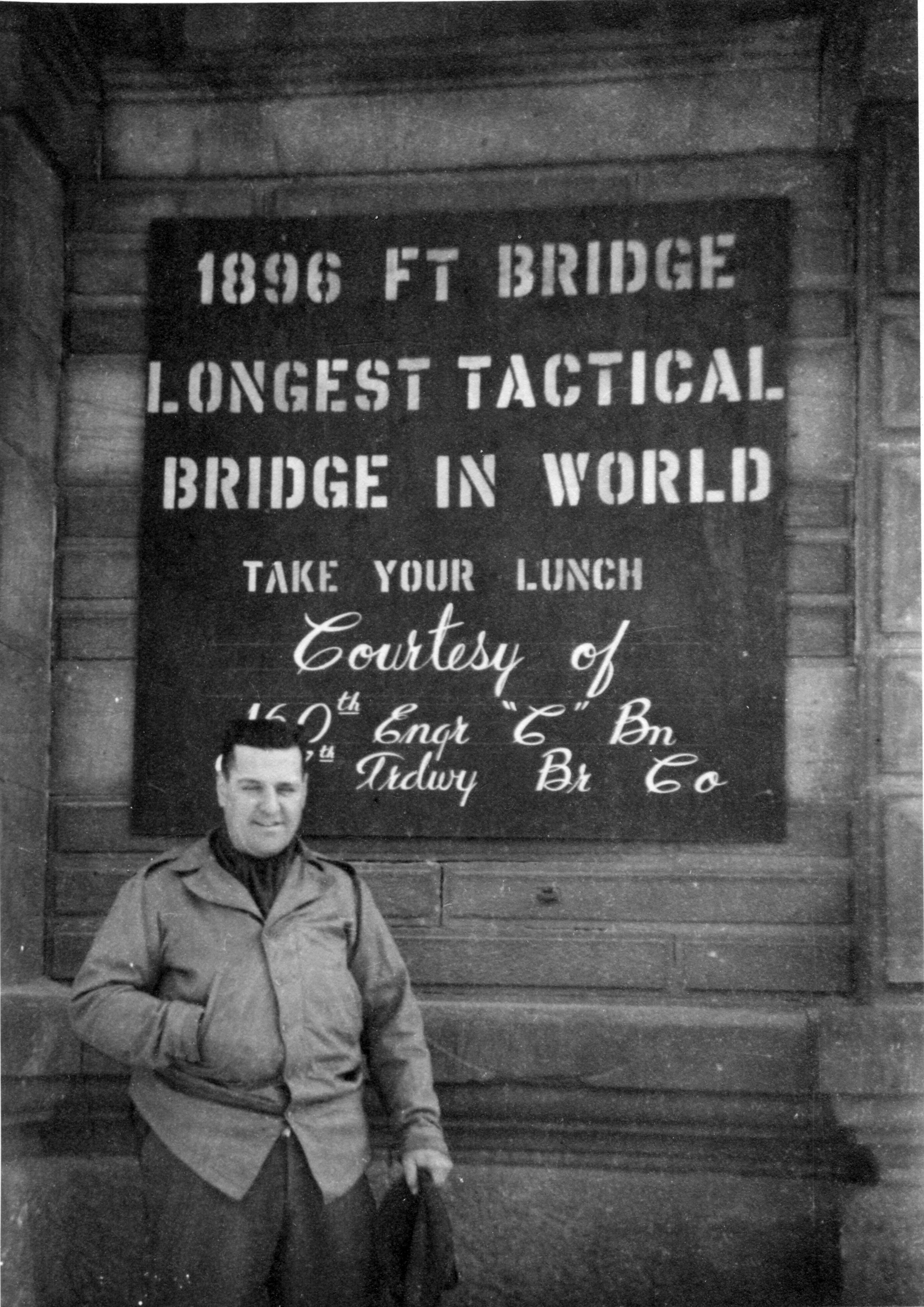
Sign at the 1,896 foot Treadway M2 Bridge across the Rhine River, April, 1945

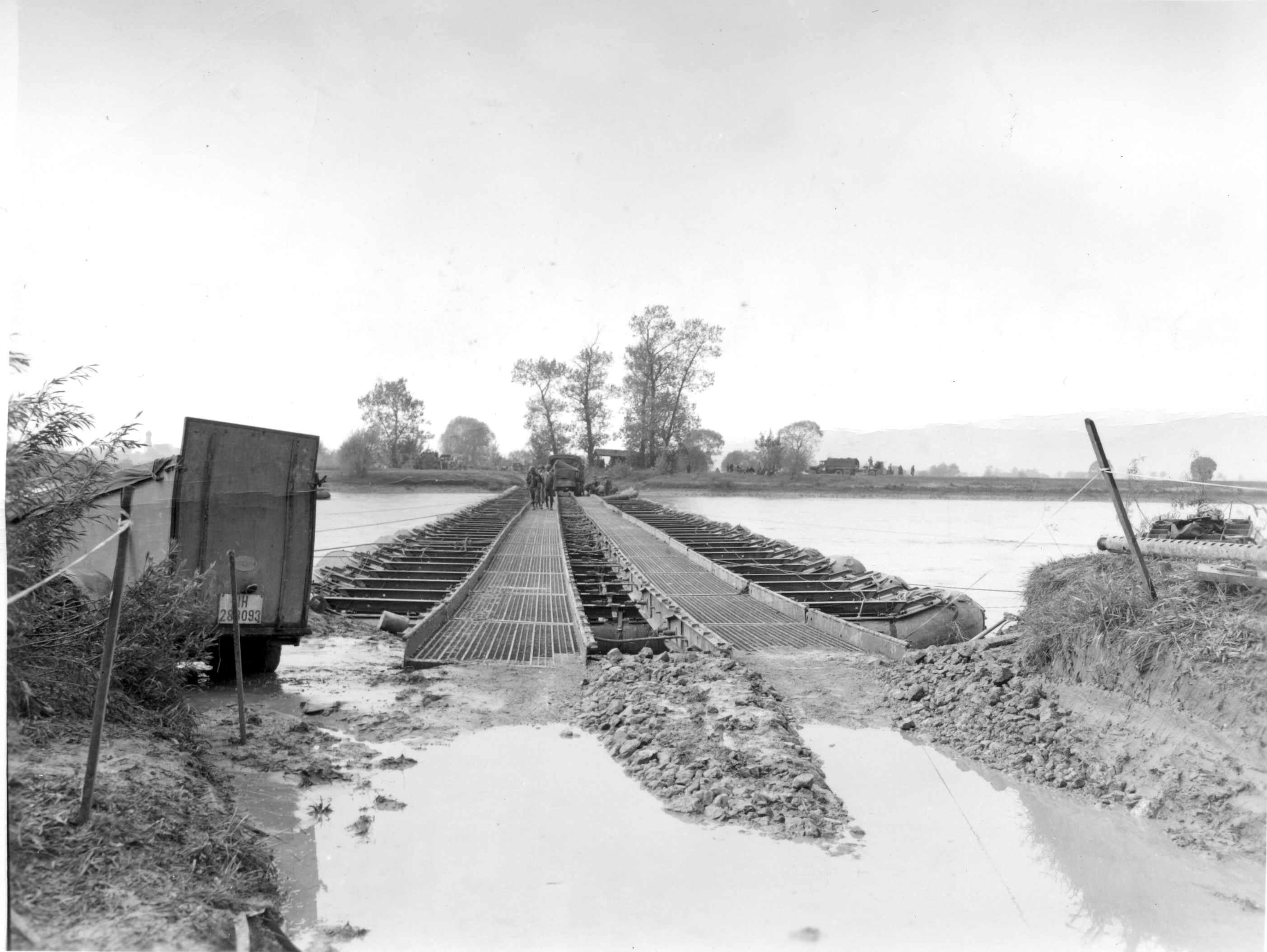
Treadway M2 Bridge built by 1139th Engineer Combat Group across Danube River south of Regensburg, April 1945

Then on March 25, 1945, while in the area of Ober-Hilbersheim, the 1139th received orders to make a major river crossing over the Rhine River at Mainz. Extensive studies were made by the 1139th Engineer Combat Group to determine the best site for crossing. Study of all available maps and photos determined that the downtown area of Mainz, was the best site, even though the Rhine was wider at that point. Profiles were prepared for the entire area, showing which terrain areas had to be captured or neutralized by artillery fire, and hydraulic data and river bed materials were studied to understand the types and sizes of anchors necessary for the bridge. Finally, site reconnaissance at the river's edge by Group personnel determined the exact location for the bridge. This crossing required two assault operations led by the 80th Infantry Division with support from the 135th Engineer Combat Battalion.

The first infantry crossing (using assault boats) incurred a high casualty rate, so the two battalions were then crossed by the 1139th Engineer Combat Group supported Naval units. Once the infantry was ashore, ferrying operations were carried on by Navy operated boats, using 6 LCMs and 6 Higgens Boats. During the launching there was heavy artillery fire, 20mm and small arms fire on the site, knocking out a bulldozer and killing a naval officer. However, the 997th Engineer Treadway Company with assistance from the 160th Engineer Combat Battalion was able to construct a Treadway M2 Bridge across the Rhine 1,896 feet long; the Longest Tactical Bridge built in the European Theater of Operations. This bridge served the entire XX Corps in crossing the Rhine and marked the end of the assault phase of the Rhine in the Third Army area.

Once across the Rhine, they found the enemy largely routed and in full retreat. On March 31, 1945, the Third Army started its run towards Berlin, from Mainz, traveling north-east through Frankfurt to Friedberg, to Alsfeld, then crossing the Fulda River with a 312-foot Treadway M2 Bridge, on to Reichensachsen. Then traveling eastward they next bridged the Werra River and traveled to Langensalza, and after bridging the Helme River on April 11, 1945, they traveled along the Autobahn for two days constructing Bailey Bridges where needed to repair sections of the highway that had been destroyed by allied bombardment. While traveling the Autobahn, they came across an area where the median strip had been paved as a landing airstrip and painted green, and on it sat an unusual-looking plane with no propeller. It turned out to be one of the German Jet planes that had been abandoned during the rapid retreat of the German Army.

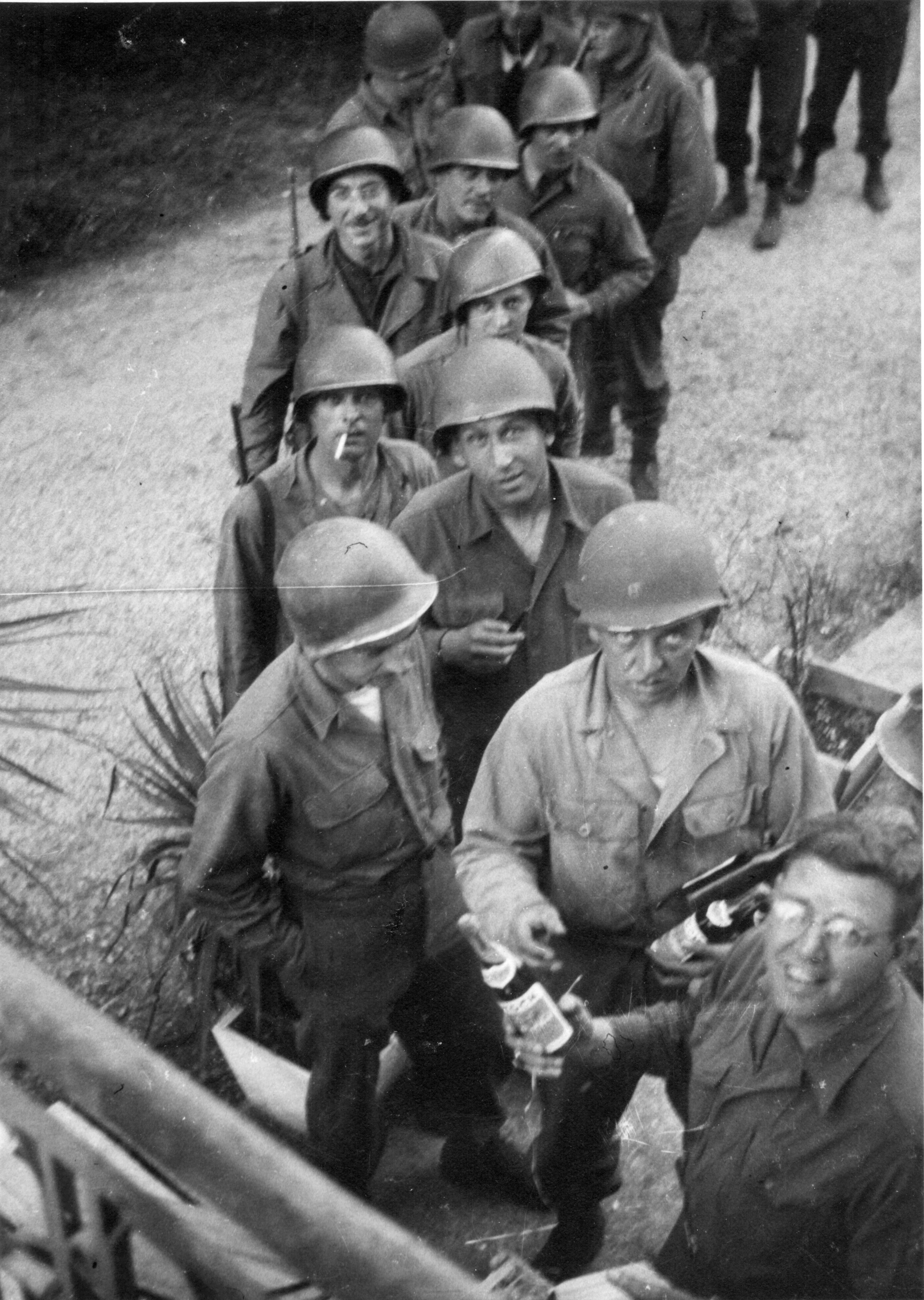
Troops celebrating VE Day with Champagne, near Lambach, Austria, May 8, 1945

The 1139th stopped in Weimar, on April 13, 1945. Here they were situated in the most luxurious barracks that they had stayed in; formerly used by German Anti-aircraft troops. However, it was also here that they saw their most horrible of all sights; the Buchenwald Concentration Camp. The Third Army had liberated the camp just two days earlier. At the urging of General Patton, many of the 1139th troops visited the camp and saw the walking skeletons, stacks of withered corpses, and incompletely burned bodies, pits of lime covered bodies, and all saw emaciated inmates from the camp walking along the road towards Weimer, and heard firsthand accounts about the horrors from a former Captain of the Dutch army, who was taken in from the camp to act as an interpreter.

On April 16, 1945, the Third army continued moving eastward until it arrived just outside of Chemnitz. At this point, they were only 135 miles from Berlin. However, with the threat of a National Redoubt (potential reorganization and resistance by the remainder of the German army), Eisenhower ordered Patton's army southward toward Bavaria and Czechoslovakia, anticipating a last stand there by Nazi German forces. The XX Corps raced south-westward to Lichtenfels; bridging the Saale and the Weisse rivers, arriving April 18, 1945. Then turning southeast they bridged the Main River and traveled to Pegnitz, and after spanning the Naab River with a 240-foot Treadway M2 Bridge arrived in Burglengenfeld on April 25, 1945. On April 27, 1945, they traveled to Regensburg where they stopped to develop plans for crossing the Danube River. Then continuing into southern Bavaria, they constructed a 516-foot Treadway M2 Bridge to cross the Danube, arriving in Straubing on April 30, 1945.

On May 2, 1945, they left Straubing and constructed a 288-foot Treadway M2 bridge to cross the Isar River at Landau an der Isar, and arrived in Ortenburg on May 3, 1945. On May 4, 1945, the 1139th constructed a 560-foot Heavy Pontoon Bridge over the Inn River at Passau, and the next day they left Ortenburg and moved southeastward to Lambach, Austria, where contact was made with the Russian forces.

This was the furthest they traveled in search for the National Redoubt by the German Army. It was here, on May 7, 1945, that the troops heard that finally Germany would officially surrender the next day. The same day General Walton H. Walker, commander of the XX Corps, received the unconditional surrender of Generaloberst Lothar Rendulic, commander of German Army Group South.

The 1139th constructed a 516-foot Treadway M2 Bridge across the Isar River at Plattling, Austria, and on May 9, 1945, they constructed their final bridge, a 755-foot Heavy Pontoon Bridge over the Inn River at Schaerding, Austria. On May 10, 1945, the 1139th left Lambach, Austria and began their return home moving north-eastward to Ried im Innkreis, Austria.

== The 1139th as part of the Army of Occupation in Germany ==
After VE Day, the 1139th was involved in assisting the German people rebuild their state as part of the U.S. Army of Occupation in Germany. Initially, the 1139th Engineer Combat Group expected to be broken up following VE Day, with some troops destined for the Pacific, while others moved to fill in personnel gaps in other units.

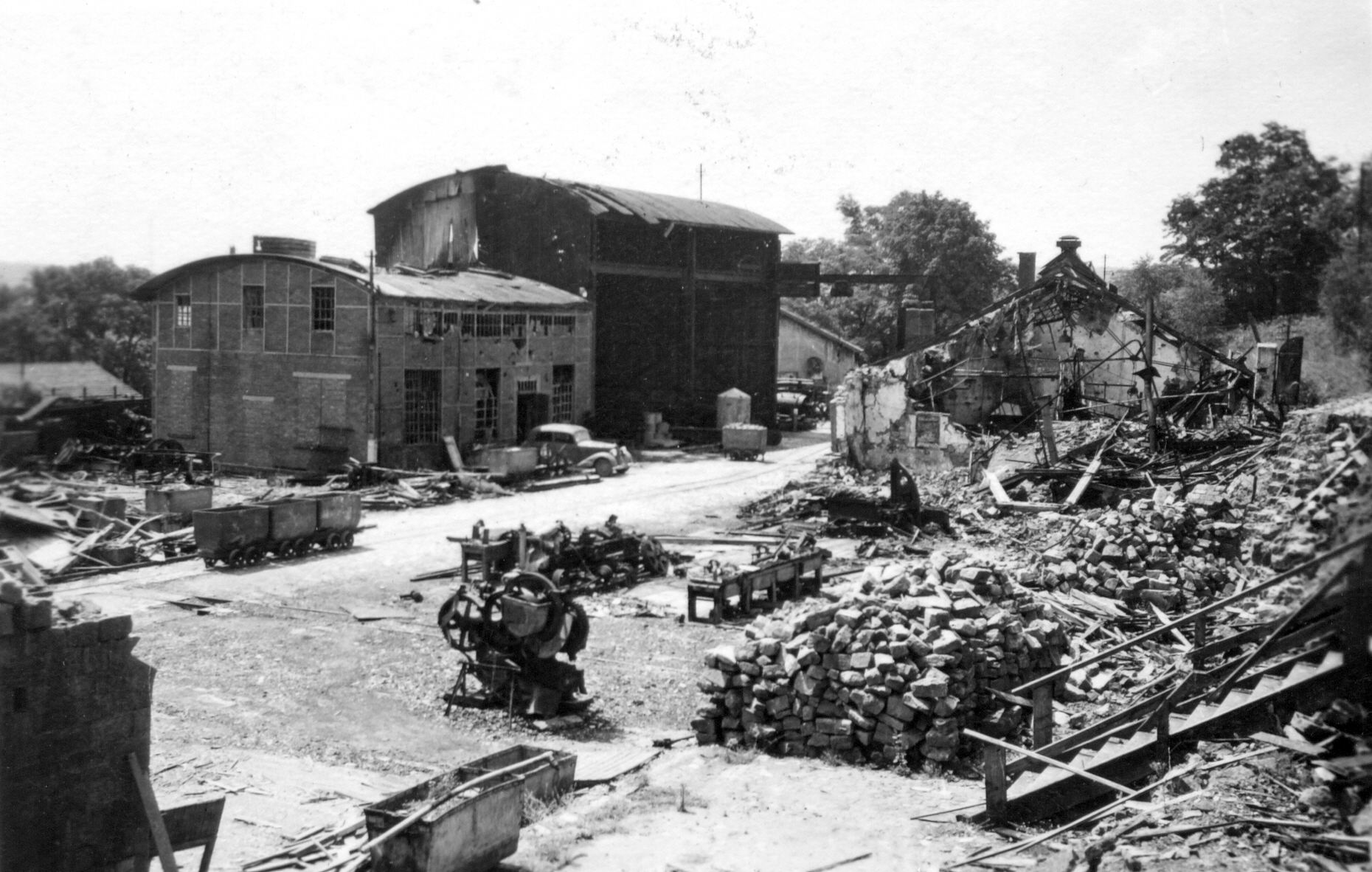
Victoria Mine; Saarland, Germany, during preparations for operation, June 1945

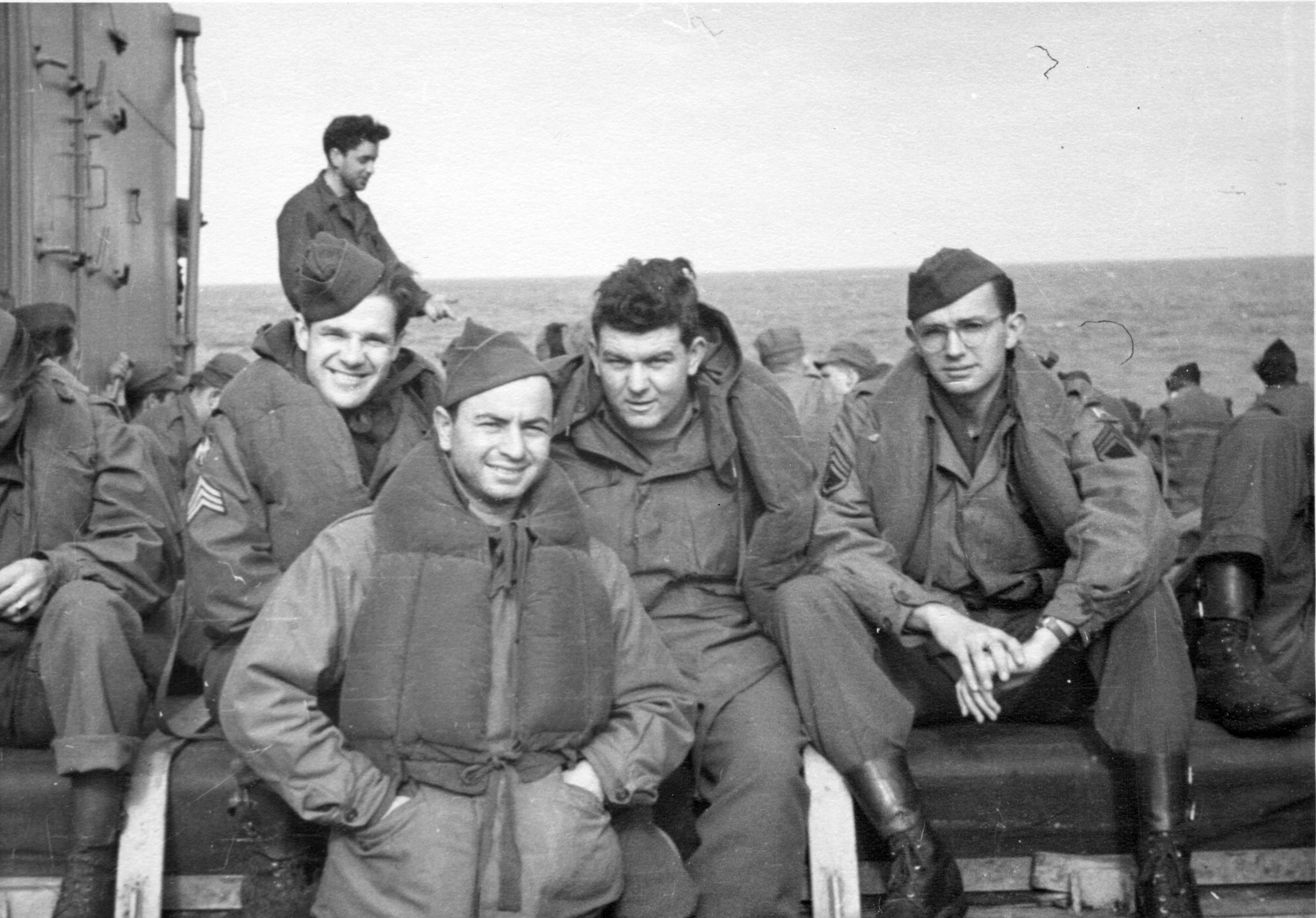
1139th troops on the way home on a Kaiser Victory Ship

However, General Eisenhower felt that rehabilitation of the Ruhr area in Germany was vital to rebuilding the German economy, because nowhere else in Europe were there coal deposits of that quality and ease of access. This coal was key to allowing Germany to rebuild its industries and in turn to feed its own population.

Colonel Niles and the 1139th Engineer Combat Group were given this duty. The 1139th was assigned to get the Bavarian and Saar coal mines back in operation. This included clearing and preparing the mine sites for return to operations, and because there were few returning coal miners, the 1139th's Engineers were also required to providing training and education to the surviving populous on running the mine. The 1139th worked on the mine projects for many months. During these activities the 1139th was experiencing a slow reduction in troop size as the GIs with 45 VE Day points or more were discharged and returned home to the states.

The 1139th Engineer Combat Group returned to the United States at Boston, Massachusetts on October 26, 1945, and was inactivated the next day at Camp Myles Standish, Massachusetts.

== Table 1: Divisions and Regiments that were supported by the 1139th Engineer Combat Group ==
Unit	Dates when the Units were supported by the 1139th
5th Infantry Division	11 - 13, 28–29 August; 20 October - 3 November 1944
26th Infantry Division	8–16 March 1945
65th Infantry Division	27 March - 2 April; 18–22 April 1945
71st Infantry Division	18 April - 7 May 1945
76th Infantry Division	3–18 April 1945
80th Infantry Division	11–13 August 1944; 13 March - 18 April 1945
83rd Infantry Division	25 September - 12 October 1944
90th Infantry Division	27 August - 22 December 1944
94th Infantry Division	11 January - 29 March 1945
95th Infantry Division	13 - 14 October; 3 - 22 Nov. 1944
7th Armored Division	12 August - 24 September 1944
10th Armored Division	11 November - 17 December 1944;11 - 12 January; 20 February - 22 March 1945
11th Armored Division	25 - 26 March 1945
12th Armored Division	19 - 24 March 1945
3rd Cavalry Regiment	30 August - 19 September 1944; 24 January - 6 February; 20–25 February; 21 March 18 - April 1945
16th Cavalry Regiment	18 - 26 March 1945
43rd Cavalry Regiment	23 August 1944

== Table 2: Battalions and Companies that were attached to the 1139th Engineer Combat Group ==
Unit	Dates when the Units were attached to the 1139th
135th Engineer Combat Battalion	10 August - 19 September; 4–15 November; 22 November 1944 - 8 May 1945
150th Engineer Combat Battalion	12 August 1944
160th Engineer Combat Battalion	17–19 August; 3–22 November 1944; 22 February - 11 March; 15 March - 8 May 1945
178th Engineer Combat Battalion	14–23 March 1945
179th Engineer Combat Battalion	12 August 1944 - 6 February 1945; 5–30 March 1945
187th Engineer Combat Battalion	10–11 January 1945
188th Engineer Combat Battalion	21–23 March 1945
206th Engineer Combat Battalion	12 August - 1 December; 5 December 1944 - 10 January 1945; 24 February - 23 April 1945
245th Engineer Combat Battalion	16 January - 10 March; 17–26 March 1945
509th Engineer Light Ponton Battalion	27 August - 22 December 1944
513th Engineer Light Ponton Battalion	6 March - 8 May 1945
528th Engineer Light Ponton Battalion	Dates Unknown
537th Engineer Light Ponton Battalion	15–25 August 1944
548th Engineer Light Ponton Battalion	22 January - 10 March; 21–28 March 1945
86th Engineer Heavy Ponton Battalion	8 May 1945
87th Engineer Heavy Ponton Battalion	23 February - 2 March 1945
88th Engineer Heavy Ponton Battalion	14–28 November, 21 - 22 Dec. 1944
180th Engineer Heavy Ponton Battalion	15 September - 22 November, 28 November 1944 - 6 February 1945
551st Engineer Heavy Ponton Battalion	2–8 May 1945
553rd Engineer Heavy Ponton Battalion	7–8 May 1945
989th Engineer Treadway Bridge Battalion	13–20 August 1944
991st Engineer Treadway Bridge Battalion	28 August 1944 - 13 January 1945
993rd Engineer Treadway Bridge Battalion	13 January - 30 March; 9 April - 8 May 1945
994th Engineer Treadway Bridge Battalion	13–28 August 1944
996th Engineer Treadway Bridge Battalion	3–22 November 1944
997th Engineer Treadway Bridge Battalion	23 February - 11 March; 15 March - 10 April 1945
1010th Engineer Treadway Bridge Battalion	20–23 March 1945
84th Chemical Smoke Generating Company	14–22 November; 21 December 1944 - 2 January 1945
161st Chemical Smoke Generating Company	16–17 September; 22 November 1944 - 2 January 1945
623rd Engineer Light Equipment Company	13 August 1944 - 8 May 1945

== Table 3: Bridges Constructed by the 1139th Engineer Combat Group ==
#	Location	Bridge Type	Length (ft)	Constructed By	Completed
1.	ST. MARS	Bailey DS C1 4.0	60	135	13 Aug-44
2.	ST. GEORGE	Bailey DS C1 40	60	205	13 Aug-44
3.	LA FERTE BERNARD (HUISNE RIVER)	Treadway M2 C1 40	48	994	15 Aug-44
4.	NOGENT LE ROTROU (HUISNE RIVER)	Treadway M2 C1 40	36	994	15 Aug-44
5.	LUCE (near CHARTRES)	Treadway M1 C1 40	1-15 & 1-30	989	16 Aug-44
6.	COURVILLE (EURE RIVER)	Bailey TS C1 40	1-100 & 1-60	537	16 Aug-44
7.	MAINTENON (EURE RIVER)	Treadway M2 C1 40	24	994	21 Aug-44
8.	MELUN (SEINE RIVER)	Foot Bridge	204	135	24 Aug-44
9.	TILLY (SEINE RIVER)	Treadway M2 C1 40	504	179 & 994	24 Aug-44
10.	VULLAINES (SEINE RIVER)	Bailey TS C1 40	210	179 & 537	26 Aug-44
11.	CHAMPAGNE (SEINE RIVER)	Bailey DD C1 40	420	206 & 509	27 Aug-44
12.	CHATILLON (MARNE RIVER)	Treadway M1 C1 40	225	135 & 991	29 Aug-44
13.	DAMERY (MARNE RIVER)	Treadway M1 C1 40	255	135 & 991	29 Aug-44
14.	VERDUN (MEUSE RIVER)	Bailey DD C1 40	200	179	4 Sep-44
15.	CONFLANS (ORNE RIVER)	Fixed RR	280	135	14 Sep-44
16.	EIX	Fixed RR	18	135	9 Sep-44
17.	ABOUE	Bailey DS C1 40	1-60 & 1-80	179 & 509	16 Sep-44
18.	PAGNY (MOSELLE RIVER)	Heavy Pontoon C1 40	260	180 & 135 & 1139	16 Sep-44
19.	PAGNY (MOSELLE CANAL)	Bailey DS C1 40	80	135 & 509	16 Sep-44
20.	VANDIERES (MOSELLE CANAL)	Bailey DS C1 40	80	135 & 509	16 Sep-44
21.	THIAUCOURT	Bailey DS C1 40	80	180	20 Sep-44
22.	ABOUE	Fixed C1 40	1-60 & 1-40	180	5 Oct-44
23.	MALLING (MOSELLE RIVER)	Treadway M2 C1 40	350	206 & 991	10 Nov-44
24.	MALLING (MOSELLE RIVER)	Treadway M2 C1 40	396	160 & 991	14 Nov-44
25.	CATTENOM (MOSELLE RIVER)	Treadway M1 C1 40	630	179 & 996	13 Nov-44
26.	THIONVILLE (MOSELLE RIVER)	Floating Bailey C1 40	530	135 & 206 & 180	15 Nov-44
27.	CATTENOM (MOSELLE RIVER)	Floating Bailey C1 40	440	179 & 180	17 Nov-44
28.	UCKANGE (MOSELLE RIVER)	Heavy Pontoon C1 40	730	88	17 Nov-44
29.	EVENDORF	Bailey DS C1 40	60	206	19 Nov-44
30.	METZ (MOSELLE RIVER)	Heavy Pontoon C1 40	675	160 & 180	21 Nov-44
31.	METZ (MOSELLE CANAL)	Bailey DS C1 40	60	160 & 509	20 Nov-44
32.	HAUTE YUTZ	Bailey SS C1 40	30	160 & 509	20 Nov-44
33.	METZERVISSE	Bailey TS C1 40	100	160 & 509	21 Nov-44
34.	KEDANGE	Bailey DD C1 40	120	135 & 509	23 Nov-44
35.	HALSTROFF	Fixed C1 40	1-24 & 1-18	205	22 Nov-44
36.	KEDANGE	Bailey TS C1 40	90	135 & 509	24 Nov-44
37.	VECKRING	Treadway M1 C1 40	45	179	24 Nov-44
38.	MONNEREN	Treadway M1 C1 40	45	179	24 Nov-44
39.	BUDING	Bailey DS C1 40	60	179 & 509	24 Nov-44
40.	APACH	Fixed C1 40	18	135	25 Nov-44
41.	MONNEREN	Fixed C1 40	40	179	25 Nov-44
42.	MONTENACH	Fixed C1 40	27	205	25 Nov-44
43.	WALDWISSE	Bailey DS C1 40	80	205	26 Nov-44
44.	COLMEN	Bailey DS C1 40	60	179	27 Nov-44
45.	MANDEREN	Fixed C1 40	50	206	26 Nov-44
46.	Q073747	Fixed C1 40	50	135	28 Nov-44
47.	BOUZONVILLE (NIED RIVER)	Bailey DS C1 40	70	206	28 Nov-44
48.	BOUZONVILLE (NIED RIVER)	Bailey DD C1 40	130	206	29 Nov-44
49.	NIEDALTDORF (NIED RIVER)	Bailey DT C1 40	180	179	2 Dec-44
50.	FILSTROFF	Bailey DS C1 40	60	179	2 Dec-44
51.	NIEDALTDORF	Bailey DS C1 40	80	179	3 Dec-44
52.	COLMEN	Bailey DS C1 40	80	179	4 Dec-44
53.	HEMMERSDORF	Bailey SS C1 40	1-20 & 1-20	135	11 Dec-44
54.	BUREN	Treadway M1 C1 40	1-45 & 1-45	135	11 Dec-44
55.	WALDWISSE	Fixed C1 30	40	135	11 Dec-44
56.	BAMBIEDERSDORF	Fixed C1 20	25	206	30 Dec-44
57.	EBLANG E	Fixed C1 40	80	206	1 Jan-45
58.	FILSTROFF	Fixed C1 40	40	179	11-Jan-45
59.	UCKANGE (MOSELLE RIVER)	Floating Bailey C1 40	540	180	15 Jan-45
60.	COLMEN	Fixed C1 40	70	179	20 Jan-45
61.	COLMEN	Fixed C1 40	70	179	23 Jan-45
62.	UCKANGE (MOSELLE RIVER)	Floating Bailey	580	548	11 Feb-45
63.	CATTENOM (MOSELLE RIVER)	Floating Bailey C1 40	440	993	11 Feb-45
64.	REMICH (MOSELLE RIVER)	Treadway M2 C1 40	458	179 & 993	21 Feb-45
65.	REMICH	Bailey DS C1 40	60	179 & 548	21 Feb-45
66.	PALZEM	Bailey DS C1 40	60	160	23 Feb-45
67.	TABEN (SAAR RIVER)	Treadway M2 C1 40	240	135 & 993	24 Feb-45
68.	SERRIG (SAAR RIVER)	Treadway M2 C1 40	320	993 & 319	26 Feb-45
69.	SAARBURG (SAAR RIVER)	Heavy Pontoon C1 40	286	135 & 87	27 Feb-45
70.	NIEDERLEUKEN (SAAR RIVER)	Heavy Pontoon C1 40	286	135 & 87	28 Feb-45
71.	MAIMUHLE( MOSELLE RIVER)	Floating Bailey C1 40	312	135 & 160 & 993 & 87	2 Mar-45
72.	SCHODEN (SAAR RIVER)	Treadway M2 C1 40	336	135 & 160 & 993	2 Mar-45
73.	OBEREMMEL	Treadway M2 C1 40	36	245	2 Mar-45
74.	LAMPADEN	Bailey DS C1 40	80	135	14 Mar-45
75.	SCHONDORF	Bailey TS C1 40	100	135	15 Mar-45
76.	BAUSENDORF	Bailey DS C1 40	80	160	12 Mar-45
77.	EHRANGE (KYLL RIVER)	Treadway M2 C1 40	120	245;993	9 Mar-45
78.	KONZ KARTHAUS	Bailey DS C1 40	80	179	6 Mar-45
79.	KONZ KARTHAUS (SAAR RIVER)	Treadway M2 C1 40	336	206 & 993	6 Mar-45
80.	KEUCHINGEN (SAAR RIVER)	Treadway M2 C1 40	276	206 & 993	17 Mar-45
81.	HINZENBURG	Bailey DS C1 40	70	135	16 Mar-45
82.	WALDRACH	Bailey DS C1 40	80	245	19 Mar-45
83.	WALDRACH	Fixed C1 40	60	245	19 Mar-45
84.	LIMBACH (PRIMS RIVER)	Bailey TD C1 40	140	179	18 Mar-45
85.	FROMM	Bailey DS C1 40	80	179	19 Mar-45
86.	WERSCHWEILER	Bailey DS C1 40	70	160 & 513	19 Mar-45
87.	ZUSCH	Treadway M2 C1 40	36	135	18 Mar-45
88.	SCHWARZENBACH	Bailey TS C1 40	180	513 & 1139	24 Mar-45
89.	SAND	Bailey DS C1 40	80	135 & 513	25 Mar-45
90.	BISCHOFSHEIM (MAIN RIVER)	Treadway M2 C1 40	612	206 & 993	28 Mar-45
91.	MAINZ (RHINE RIVER)	Treadway M2 C1 40	1896	160 & 997	29 Mar-45
92.	BRIEDENBACH (FULDA RIVER)	Bailey DD C1 40	130	135	3 Apr-45
93.	GUXHAGEN (FULDA RIVER)	Treadway M2 C1 40	312	160	4 Apr-45
94.	ALLENDORF (WERRA RIVER)	Treadway M2 C1 40	168	160 & 993	9 Apr-45
95.	JESTADT (WERRA RIVER)	Treadway M2 C1 40	144	135 & 997	7 Apr-45
96.	GEBESSEE (HELME RIVER)	Bailey DS C1 40	80	135	11 Apr-45
97.	On the Autobahn (J271605)	Bailey DS C1 40	80	206	12 Apr-45
98.	On the Autobahn (J380638)	Bailey DS C1 40	50	206	12 Apr-45
99.	On the Autobahn (J494662)	Bailey DS C1 40	60	206	13 Apr-45
100.	On the Autobahn (J439669)	Bailey DS Cl 40	50	206	12 Apr-45
101.	On the Autobahn (J462671)	Bailey DS C1 40	60	206	12 Apr-45
102.	ZEITZ (WEISSE RIVER)	Treadway M2 C1 40	120	135	14 Apr-45
103.	SAALE RIVER	Bailey TS C1 40	190	206	15 Apr-45
104.	ZEITZ (WEISSE RIVER)	Bailey DS C1 40	180	135	16 Apr-45
105.	BAUNACH (MAIN RIVER)	Treadway M2 C1 40	132	993 & 265	18 Apr-45
106.	AUERBACH	Treadway M2 C1 40	1-36 & 1-36	160 & 993	20 Apr-45
107.	ALTNEUHAUS	Treadway M2 C1 40	1-36 & 1-36	160 & 993	21 Apr-45
108.	On the Autobahn (0-603142)	Bailey DS C1 40	40	135 & 513	22 Apr-45
109.	AMBERG	Bailey DS C1 40	70	135 & 513	24 Apr-45
110.	SCHWANDORF (NAAB RIVER)	Treadway M2 C1 40	240	160 & 993	24 Apr-45
111.	REGENSTAUF	Bailey TS C1 40	110	160 & 513	24 Apr-45
112.	SULZBACH (DANUBE RIVER)	Treadway M2 C1 40	516	160 & 993	26 Apr-45
113.	REGENSBURG (REGEN RIVER)	Bailey DS C1 40	160	135 & 513	28 Apr-45
114.	NIEDER (DANUBE RIVER)	Treadway M2 C1 40	516	993 & 513	28 Apr-45
115.	LANDAU (ISAR RIVER)	Treadway M2 C1 40	288	160 & 993 & 995	1 May-45
116.	PASSAU (INN RIVER)	Heavy Pontoon C1 17	560	135 & 551	4 May-45
117.	PASSAU (INN RIVER)	Bailey TS C1 24	730	135 & 513	7 May-45
118.	SCHARDING (INN RIVER)	Heavy Pontoon C1 17	755	135 & 86	9 May-45
119.	PLATTLING (ISAR) RIVER)	Treadway M2 C1 40	516	135 & 993	8 May-45

== Table 4: Awards received by soldiers of the 1139th Engineer Combat Group ==
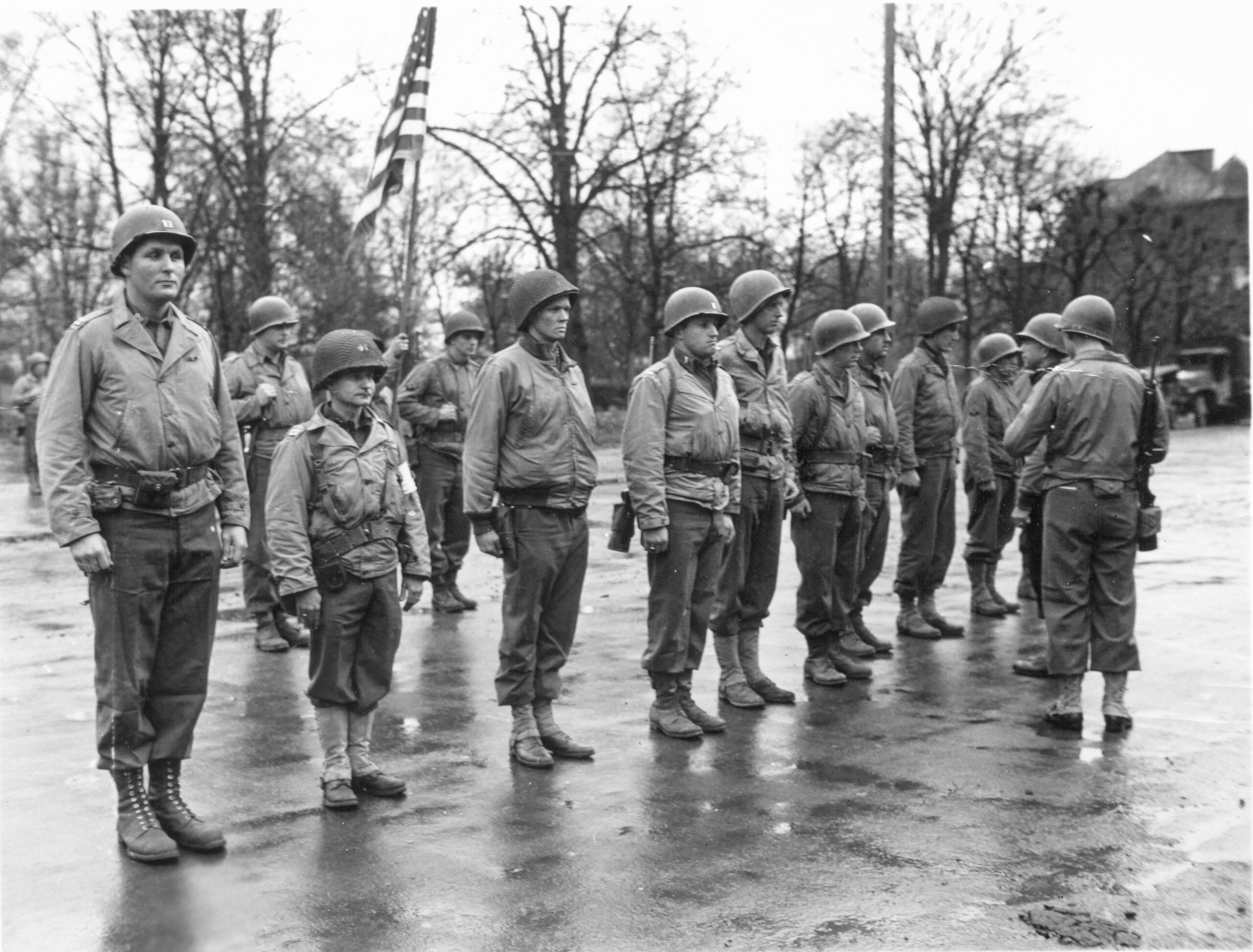
Reading Citations for 1139th troops to be decorated; Thionville, France, November, 1944

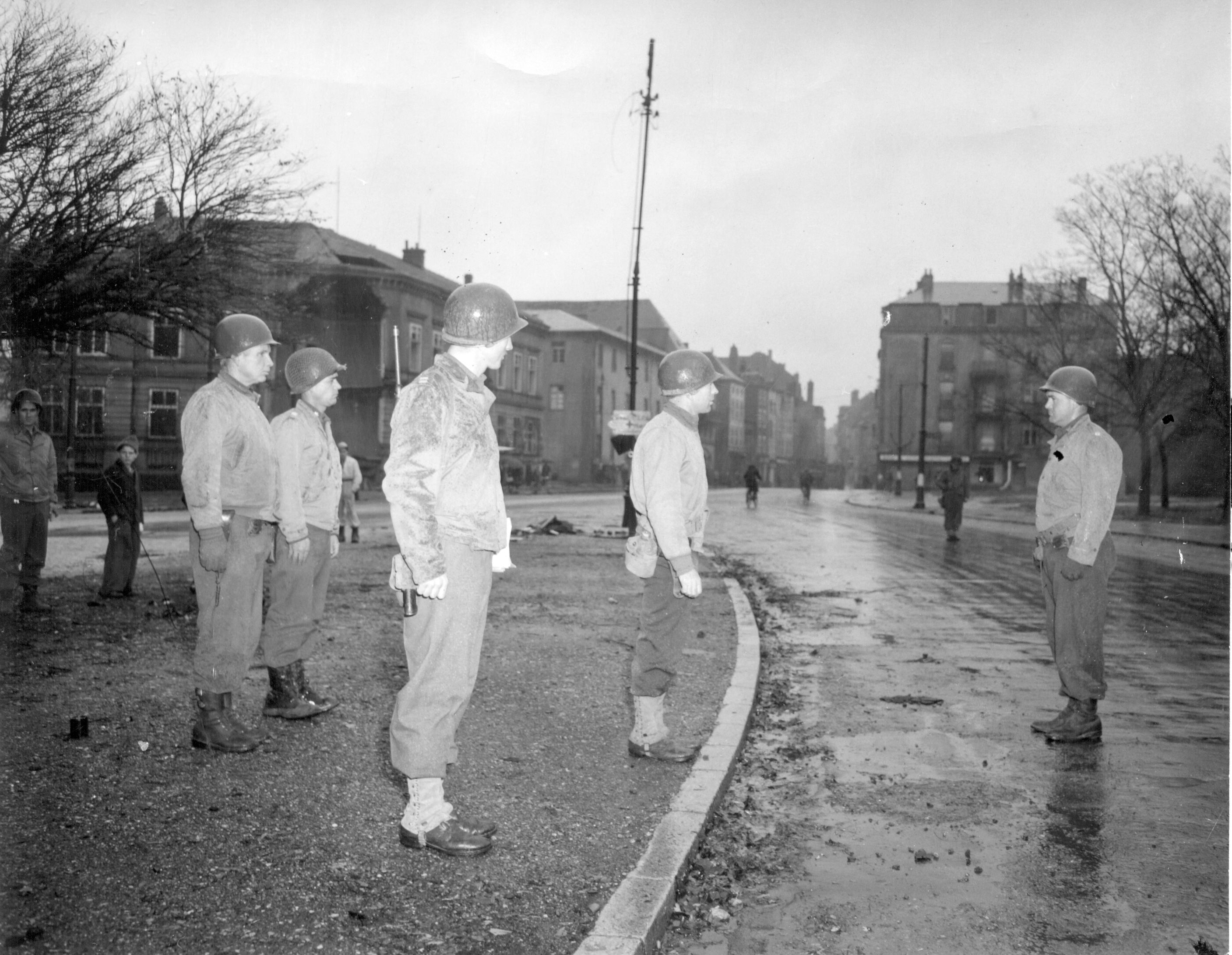
1139th Ceremony at Thionville, France, November 1944

Award	Rank	Recipient	Notes
SILVER STAR	Officers:	JOHN S. NILES	
		JOHN H. JACKSON	
BRONZE STAR	Officers:	DOUGLAS E. ARNOLD	
		FRANK A. KULAS	
		EMIL C. DEUTSCHLE	
		JOHN S. NILES	with oak leaf cluster
		ROBERT S. EININGER	
		EVAN L. OWEN	with oak leaf cluster
		LUTHER D. FLETCHER	
		MAURICE RAPKIN	
		JOHN H. JACKSON	
	Enlisted Men:	ALAN [ALLEN] G. CLEMENTS	
		JOSEPH F. NOLTE	
		EDWARD A. COLTON	
		BERNARD E. PAGEL, JR.	
		EDGAR D. CONRAD	
		GOLDA PETTYJOHN, JR.	
		ROBERT R. CRANKSHAW	
		ROBERT H. SHINN	
		MAURICE L. MARCUS	
		RUSSELL L. STANLEY	
		JOHN J. MCGREGOR	
		WILLIAM D. WOOTEN	
PURPLE HEART	Officers:	DOUGLAS E. ARNOLD	
		JOHN S. NILES	
		FREDERICK HERRMANN	
		MAURICE RAPKIN	
	Enlisted Men:	ALAN [ALLEN] G. CLEMENTS	
		STANLEY L. JOHNSTON	
