= Camp Sibert =

U.S. Army chemical weapons training facility in Alabama

Coordinates: 33.930547°N 86.132826°W

Camp Sibert was a U.S. Army chemical weapons training facility during the World War II era in Etowah County and St. Clair County in Alabama. Covering 32,000 acres, the land for the camp was acquired by the Army in 1942. The site has been redeveloped, including a residential community, but concerns over chemical contamination and unexploded ordnance remain. The camp was named for Major General William L. Sibert, first commander of the Army's Chemical Warfare Service, and coincidentally an Etowah County native.

From September 1942 to March 1945, the camp was commanded by Brigadier General Haig Shekerjian, an Armenian-American graduate of the West Point class of 1911. Private A. Baligian of the U.S. Army visited Camp Sibert and conducted a brief interview with Shekerjian for the June 16, 1943, issue of Hairenik Weekly (later renamed the Armenian Weekly).
