= XX Corps (United States) =

IV Armored Corps XX Corps
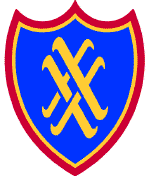
- Shoulder sleeve insignia of XX Corps
- Active: 27 August 1942–1 March 1946; 5 August 1957–5 June 1970
- Country: United States of America
- Branch: United States Army
- Role: Headquarters
- Size: Corps
- Part of: Third United States Army; 1942–46; Second United States Army; 1957–70
- Engagements: World War II; Normandy; Northern France; Rhineland; Ardennes-Alsace; Central Europe

Commanders
- Notable commanders: Horace L. McBride; Walton H. Walker

Insignia
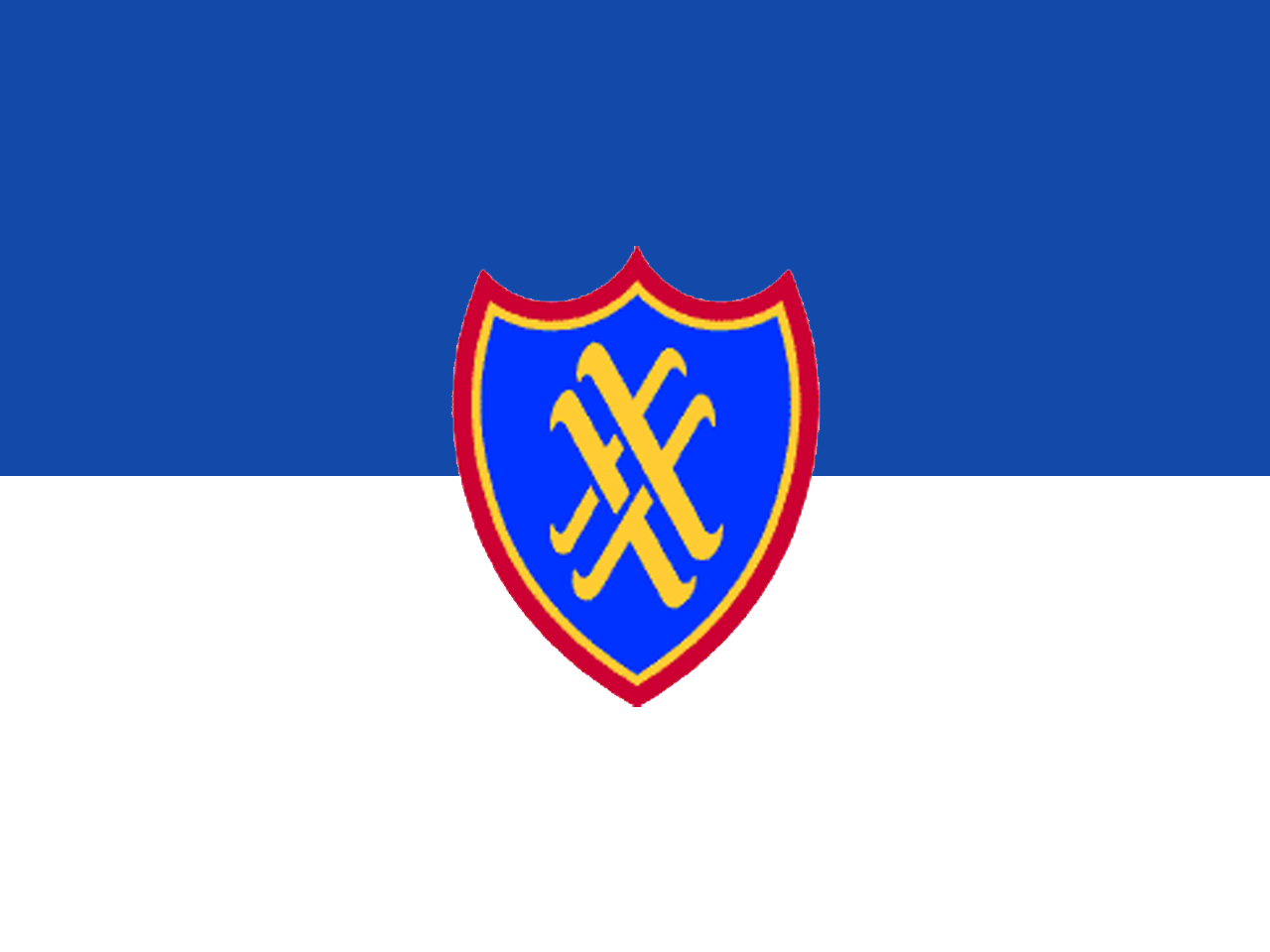
- XX Corps Flag

The XX Corps of the United States Army fought from northern France to Austria in World War II. Constituted on 10 October 1943 by re-designating the IV Armored Corps of the Army Ground Forces, a training organization which had been activated at Camp Young, California on 5 September 1942, XX Corps became operational in France as part of Lieutenant General George S. Patton's U.S. Third Army on 1 August 1944.

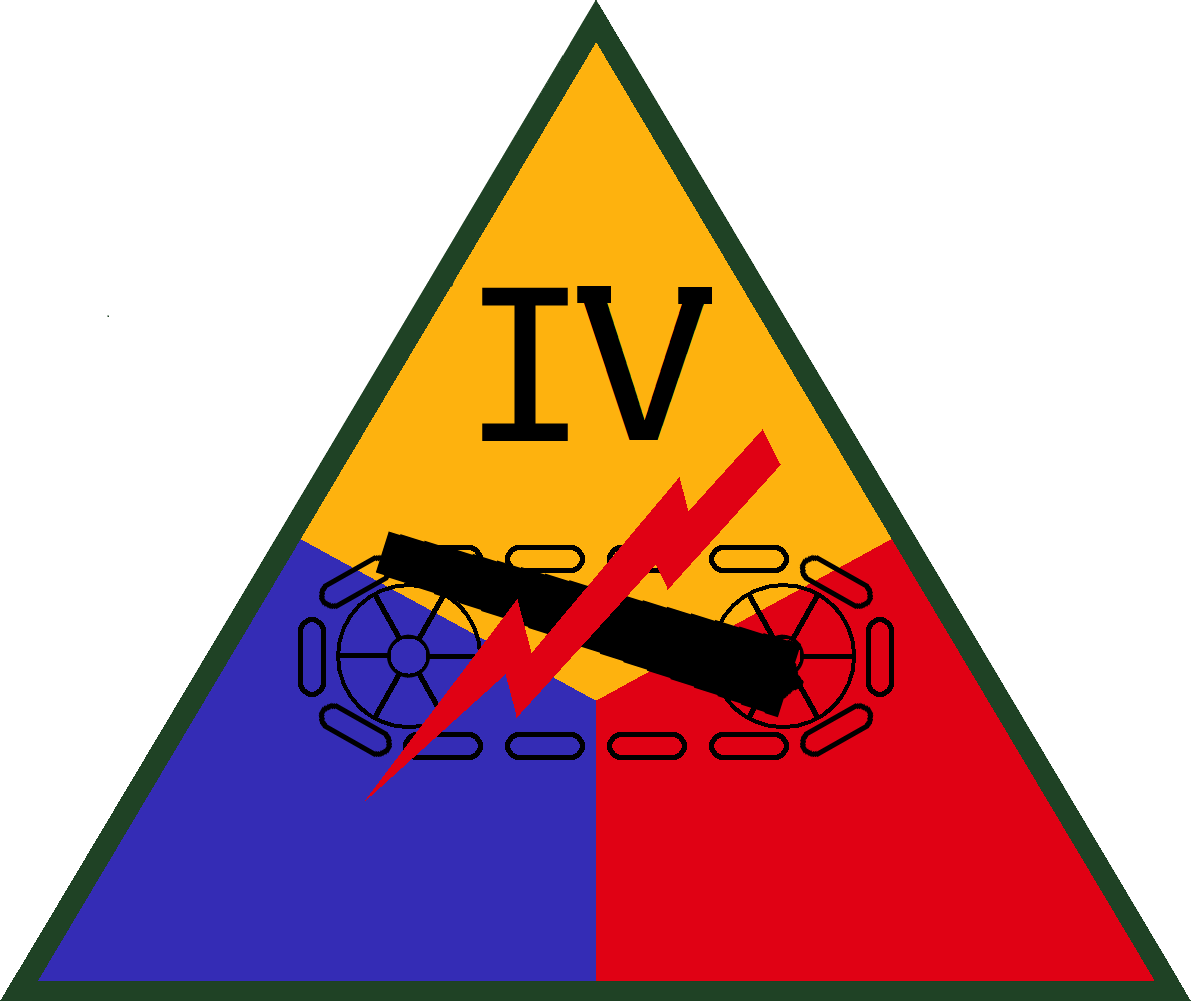
IV Armored Corps
5 September 1942 - 10 October 1943

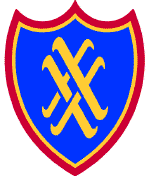
XX Corps
After 10 October 1943

== Northern France ==
Initially assigned to protect the south flank of the U.S. Third Army, XX Corps secured the bridgehead at Le Mans and liberated Angers on 10 August 1944. The corps fought a successful five-day battle for Chartres from 15 – 19 August, and seized a bridgehead over the Aunay River. Liberating Fontainebleau on 23

August, the corps moved rapidly east against disorganized German resistance and seized bridgeheads over the Seine River at Melun and Montereau. Still pushing east at a rapid rate of advance, XX Corps liberated Château-Thierry and captured a bridgehead across the Marne River on 27 August 1944. This feat was followed by the liberation of Reims two days later. The August succession of bridgehead captures culminated in the liberation of Verdun and seizure of a bridgehead over the Meuse River on 31 August. Although the corps had conducted a brilliant pursuit of the Germans in August, a crippling shortage of gasoline caused by the unexpectedly rapid advance of Allied armies across France practically immobilized XX Corps at the onset of September 1944.

== The tactical situation transforms ==
Movement of XX Corps units was practically nil for the first week of September, 1944, although corps units feinted in the direction of Sedan and the U.S. 90th Infantry Division crossed the Meuse River to join the rest of the corps near the Moselle River. While the corps was at a standstill for a lack of gasoline, the Germans in and south of the fortress city of Metz had been hurriedly reorganizing and establishing cohesive defensive lines. The German Replacement Army had moved into Metz itself the 462nd Volksgrenadier Division, made up of odds and ends such as fortress infantry battalions and infantry leader schools. Despite its less than impressive heritage, the 462nd Division would prove to be a determined foe for no less than three months, significantly delaying XX Corps' push to the German frontier. When XX Corps advanced again, the tactical situation had transformed from a pursuit against a disorganized foe to a slogging advance against regrouped German forces. On 7 September 1944, elements of XX Corps, again refueled but still facing persistent shortages of gasoline and artillery munitions, moved out towards Metz and Thionville.

== Across the Moselle ==
On 8 September 1944, the German 106th Panzer Brigade counterattacked the 90th Infantry Division near Mairy but failed to rout the U.S. infantrymen. In the ensuing battle, the "Tough Hombres" of the 90th Division destroyed the Panzer brigade, causing the Germans losses of 30 tanks, 60 halftracks, and almost 100 other vehicles. On the same day, the 5th Infantry Division forced a crossing of the Moselle at Dornot, but found German opposition intense and carved out a shallow bridgehead. Intense German counterattacks forced the abandonment of the Dornot bridgehead on the night of 10 – 11 September, but the 5th Division had established another bridgehead at Arnaville on 10 September. This crossing, and simultaneous advance toward Metz were met with desperate counterattacks by German forces, including the 17th S.S. Panzergrenadier Division. On 12 September, the 90th Infantry Division cleared Thionville west of the Moselle River, and engineer bridges were completed at Arnaville, allowing armored fighting vehicles to cross into the bridgehead. Subsequently, artillery fire from Fort Driant (part of the Metz fortifications) made bridging and ferrying operations by the corps at Arnaville quite difficult. Finally, on 16 September, armored elements of the corps (7th Armored Division) broke out of the Arnaville bridgehead and advanced toward the river Seille. Attacks by the 90th Infantry Division towards Metz during this period were handily repulsed by the Germans.

== Tentative moves against Metz ==
Concentrating its units near the Arnaville bridgehead, XX Corps found German resistance between the Moselle and the Seille very intense, with fire from the German bank of the Seille causing significant losses among units of the 7th Armored Division. Taking the village of Pournoy-la-Chétive on 20 September, units of the 5th Division withstood German counterattacks for several days. During this period, the 7th Armored Division left the corps and was replaced by the 6th Armored Division. Continuing supply difficulties forced the corps into a defensive stance on 24 September and resulted in some very hard-won ground having to be abandoned. In the final week of September, XX Corps made fruitless probing attacks toward Fort Driant. On 28 September 1944, grasping how difficult Metz would be to take, U.S. Third Army declared the seizure of Metz to be the army's priority mission. October 1944 proved to be a month of grinding, indecisive action for the corps. Reaching the outskirts of Maizières-lès-Metz on 2 October, the 90th Division commenced a lengthy struggle for the town that finally ended with the Americans taking the town on 30 October 1944. This was a significant victory because it opened a direct route for the corps to advance upon Metz from the north. The 11th Infantry Regiment, 5th Infantry Division, attacked Fort Driant from 3 – 12 October, but found its strength and weapons wanting against determined German resistance in the old fort. After bitter fighting marked by German raids that emerged from underground chambers, the 11th Infantry broke off the attack. By November, XX Corps had regrouped, and assaulted Metz. US forces entered the city on 18 November, and hostilities ended on 21 November, though some German elements held out in the small forts around the city.

== Campaign credits and inactivation ==
XX Corps is credited with service in the Normandy, Northern France, Rhineland, Ardennes-Alsace, and Central Europe campaigns. Headquarters, XX Corps, was inactivated on 1 March 1946 in Germany.

== Cold War ==
The corps was subsequently active as part of the Regular Army from 1957 until 1970 at Fort Hayes, Ohio. In March 1966, according to the Daily Kent Stater, it was under the command of Major General Henry K. Benson, Jr.

After the corps was inactivated, some of its units may have been taken over by the 83rd Army Reserve Command, including the 338th Army Band.

== Honors ==
XX Corps received the French order of the Legion of Honour from the prefect of the Department of the Upper Marne on 6 November 1944.
