= Roundup =

A roundup is a systematic gathering together of people or things.

Roundup, Round Up or Round-up may also refer to:

== Agriculture ==
- A muster (livestock) (AU/NZ) or a roundup (US/CA) is the process of gathering livestock.
- Roundup (herbicide), a Monsanto brand of glyphosate-based herbicides
- Roundup Ready, a Monsanto trademark for patented GMO crop seeds

== Arts and entertainment ==
=== Film ===
- The Round-Up (1920 film), a Western
- The Round-Up (1941 film), a Western
- The Round-Up (1966 film), a Hungarian film by Miklós Jancsó
- The Round Up (2010 film), a French film
- The Roundup (film series), a South Korean film series
  - The Roundup (2022 film), a South Korean film
  - The Roundup: No Way Out, a South Korean film
  - The Roundup: Punishment, a South Korean film

=== Music ===
- Roundup (album), an album by Denise Ho
- "Round Up" (Lady May song), a rap single by Lady May and Blu Cantrell

=== Other uses ===
- Round-Up (video game), an arcade video game
- The Roundup (radio program), a former Canadian radio program
- Round Up (ride), an amusement park ride
- A Round-Up, a 1905 play by Anthony E. Wills

== Military and law enforcement ==
- Operation Roundup (1942), WWII Allied plan to invade France
- Operation Roundup (1951), an American attack in the Korean War
- Roundup (police action), targeting random members of a group for mass arrest

== Other uses ==
- Rounding up, when a boat heads into the wind, the rudder having no effect
- Roundup, Montana, US city
- Roundup, Texas, a US city
- Roundup (issue tracker), web-based issue or bug tracking system
- Roundup (transit), the bus system of the University of Wyoming
- Edsel Roundup, a 1950s station wagon built by Ford
- The Round Up (newspaper), student newspaper of New Mexico State University
- Roundup, a magazine published by the Western Writers of America
- Rounding up is one type of mathematical rounding, or approximation

== See also ==
- List of rodeos
- Pendleton Round-Up, a rodeo in Oregon
- Rattlesnake round-up
- Surin Elephant Round-up, an annual event in Thailand
