= Gabe Vasquez =

American politician (born 1984)

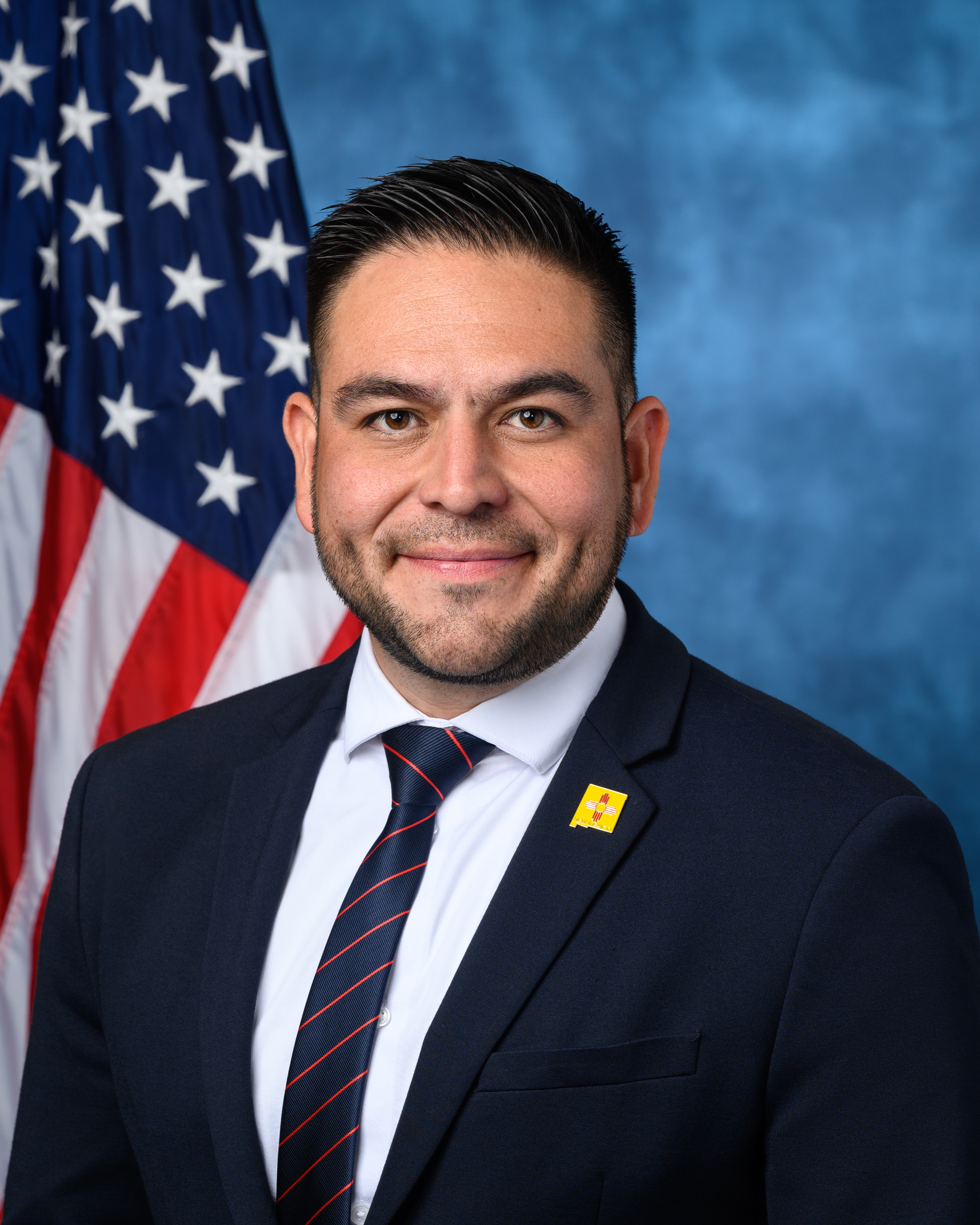
- Official portrait, 2023

Member of the U.S. House of Representatives from New Mexico's 2nd district
- Incumbent
- Assumed office January 3, 2023
- Preceded by: Yvette Herrell

Member of the Las Cruces City Council from the 3rd district
- In office November 2017 – December 2021
- Preceded by: Olga Pedroza
- Succeeded by: Becki Graham

Personal details
- Born: August 3, 1984 (age 42) El Paso, Texas, U.S.
- Party: Democratic
- Education: New Mexico State University (BA)
- Website: House website Campaign website

Gabriel Vasquez (born August 3, 1984) is an American politician serving as the U.S. representative for New Mexico's 2nd congressional district since 2023. A member of the Democratic Party, he previously served on the Las Cruces City Council from 2017 to 2021. Vasquez's district covers southern New Mexico, including Las Cruces, Carlsbad, and the southern fourth of Albuquerque.

== Early life and education ==
Vasquez was born on August 3, 1984, in El Paso, Texas. He was raised in the El Paso–Juárez–Las Cruces border region, spending much of his childhood in both the United States and Mexico. He grew up in Ciudad Juárez, Mexico, where he spent time in his grandfather's television repair shop. His grandfather Javier Bañuelos, originally from Zacatecas, Mexico, had transitioned from farming to working as a mailman before establishing his repair business. His paternal grandfather Esteban Vasquez was employed in the restaurant industry for decades. He was born in Chihuahua City and then migrated to Ciudad Juarez in the 1960s where he raised his family to include his father. Esteban continued to work in high-end restaurants in both Ciudad Juarez and El Paso, Texas where he was part of the union and a leader in the making. Gabriel's father is a retired successful business man. His mother is also a retired banker who worked in major corporations in the U.S.A.

Vasquez later attended Montwood High School in El Paso and then enrolled at New Mexico State University (NMSU) in Las Cruces, where he earned a Bachelor of Arts degree in English and journalism in 2008. During college, he served as the news editor and later as editor-in-chief of The Round Up, NMSU's student-run newspaper.

== Career ==
Vasquez began his career as the business editor for the Las Cruces Bulletin from 2008 to 2011. He later served as executive director of the Las Cruces Hispanic Chamber of Commerce before joining SDS Inc. as executive vice president for public relations.

From 2013 to 2015, Vasquez worked as a field representative for U.S. Senator Martin Heinrich. He also worked as vice president of communications for First Focus on Children, director of community relations for the New Mexico Wildlife Federation, and deputy state director for the Wilderness Society. He later worked as deputy director for federal lands at the Western Conservation Foundation from 2019 to 2021.

In 2017, Vasquez was elected to the Las Cruces City Council, where he served until 2021.

== U.S. House of Representatives ==
=== Elections ===
==== 2022 ====
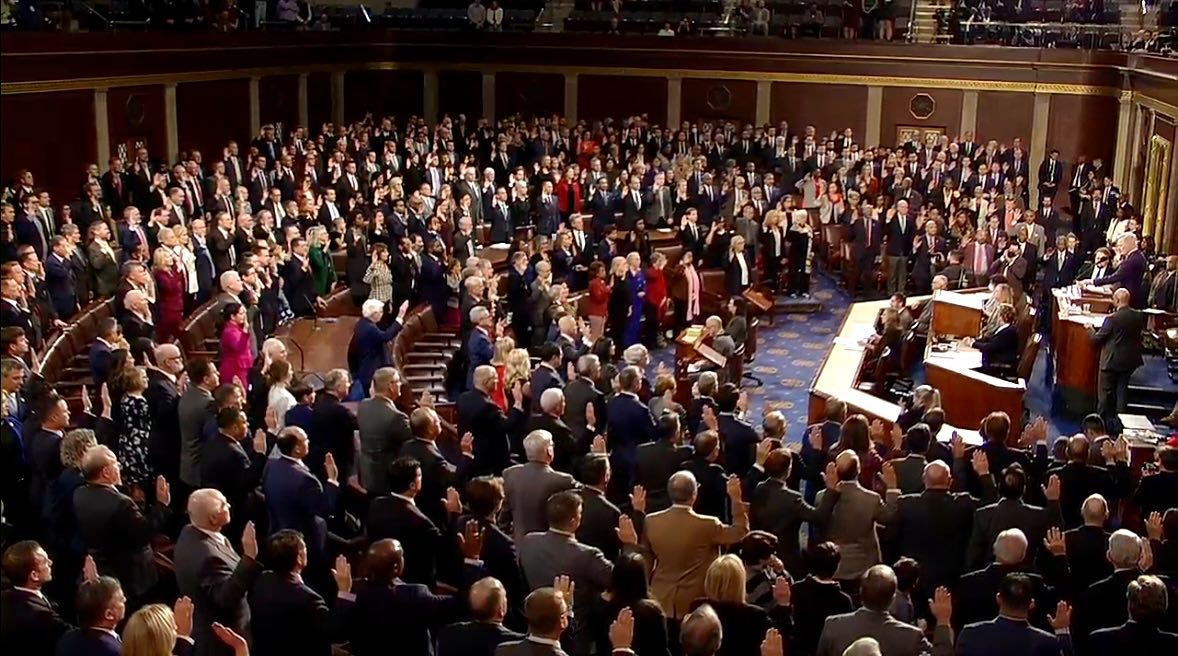
Vasquez and the 118th Congress are sworn into the U.S. House of Representatives, 2023

Vasquez was the Democratic nominee for New Mexico's 2nd congressional district in the 2022 election. He won on November 8, 2022, by 1,350 votes, defeating Republican incumbent Yvette Herrell. The district's boundaries were redrawn after the 2020 census, drawing the previously Republican-leaning district to be Democratic-leaning.

During the campaign, Vasquez deleted tweets critical of the oil and gas industry, rationalizing rioting in the summer of 2020, and comparing the Trump administration to the Ku Klux Klan. He supported President Joe Biden's 2021 pause on new oil and gas leases, citing the need for a transition to renewable energy while balancing the district's economic reliance on the energy sector.

==== 2024 ====
Vasquez ran for reelection in 2024 against Republican former Congresswoman Yvette Herrell in a rematch of the 2022 race. Vasquez once again defeated Herrell, this time by 11,032 votes, despite Donald Trump narrowly flipping New Mexico's 2nd district in the concurrent presidential election.

==== 2026 ====
Vasquez ran for a third term against Republican Greg Cunningham, who he defeated.

Through late September, Vasquez had raised nearly $3.8 million for the cycle against Cunningham's $1.8 million.

=== Tenure ===
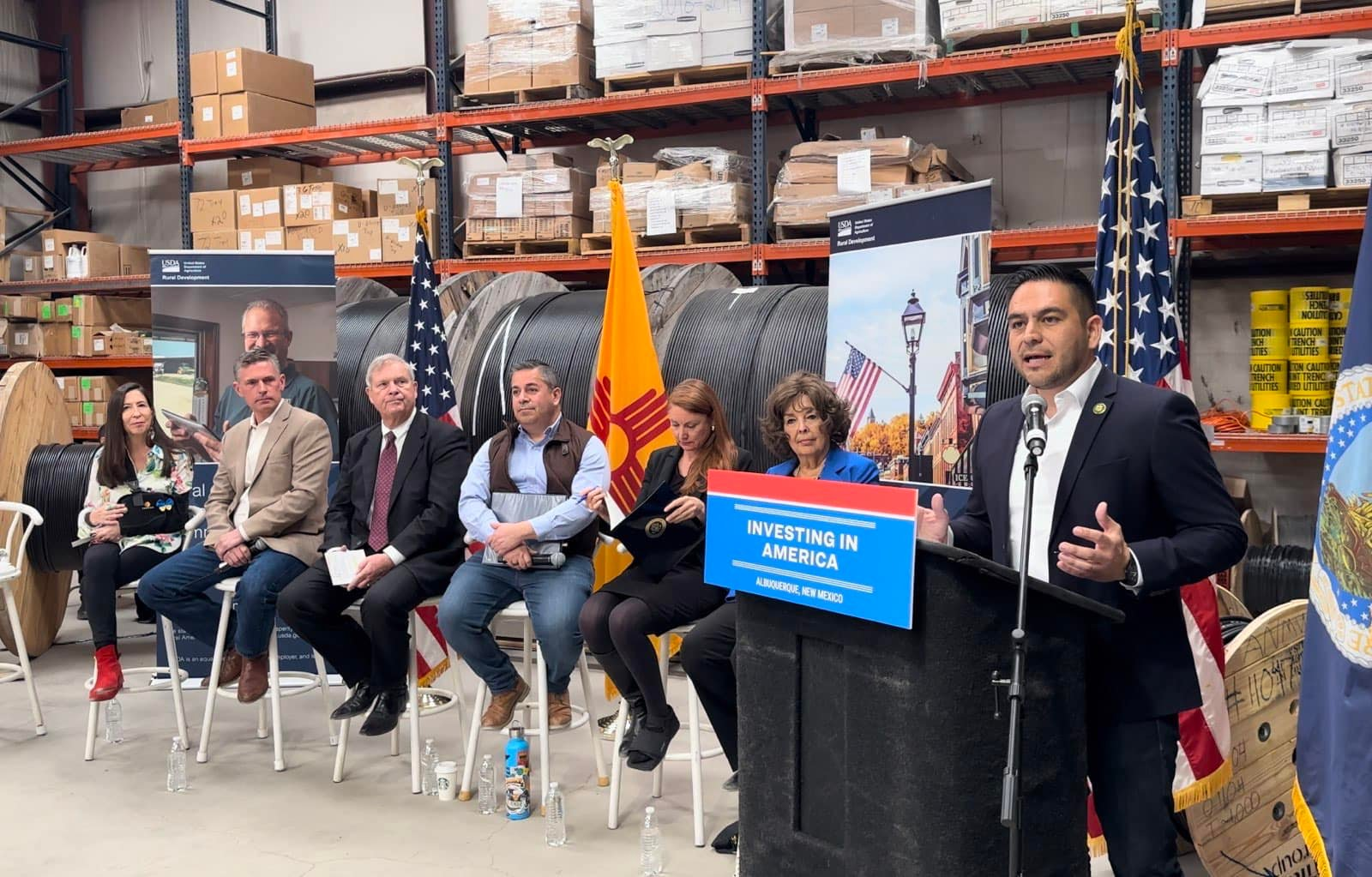
Vasquez discusses new funding for broadband internet for rural New Mexico, 2023

In 2023, Vasquez introduced bipartisan legislation aimed at addressing the teacher shortage in Indian Country. The bill proposed providing federal pension benefits to educators working in tribal schools, seeking to improve teacher retention and support Native American students.

Vasquez voted that year in favor of requiring healthcare workers to receive the COVID-19 vaccine. The following day, he opposed a resolution to end the COVID-19 national emergency. On women's health, he has supported abortion rights and advocated for codifying Roe v. Wade into federal law.

In 2024, Vasquez voted in favor of the Protecting Americans from Foreign Adversary Controlled Applications Act, sometimes called the TikTok ban, which sought to address concerns over data security and foreign influence. On July 19, he called for President Joe Biden to withdraw from the 2024 presidential election, citing concerns over his age and ability to campaign effectively.

In December 2025, NBC News and The New York Times reported that Vasquez had voted against a bill to reopen the federal government and then touted the money the bill delivered to his district. After the federal government was reopened, primarily with Republican votes, after a 43-day shutdown, Vasquez was among Democrats who "claimed credit for some provisions in the bill." Former Speaker Nancy Pelosi coined the term "vote no and take the dough" when Republicans took credit for money brought to their districts under bills they opposed.

In May 2025, Vasquez worked with Representative Ryan Zinke to create the bipartisan Public Lands Caucus. He voted for a War Powers Resolution to end the 2026 Iran war, arguing that the Trump administration had acted without proper congressional authorization. Vasquez has called on a moratorium on data center construction in Socorro County and has sponsored bills to stop residents from having to pay heightened rates on utility bills. He has also called on data center developments to disclose their energy and water use publicly.

In September 2026, he voted for a resolution which denounced socialism and the Democratic Socialists of America, and called for the passage of the SAVE America Act.

=== Committee assignments ===
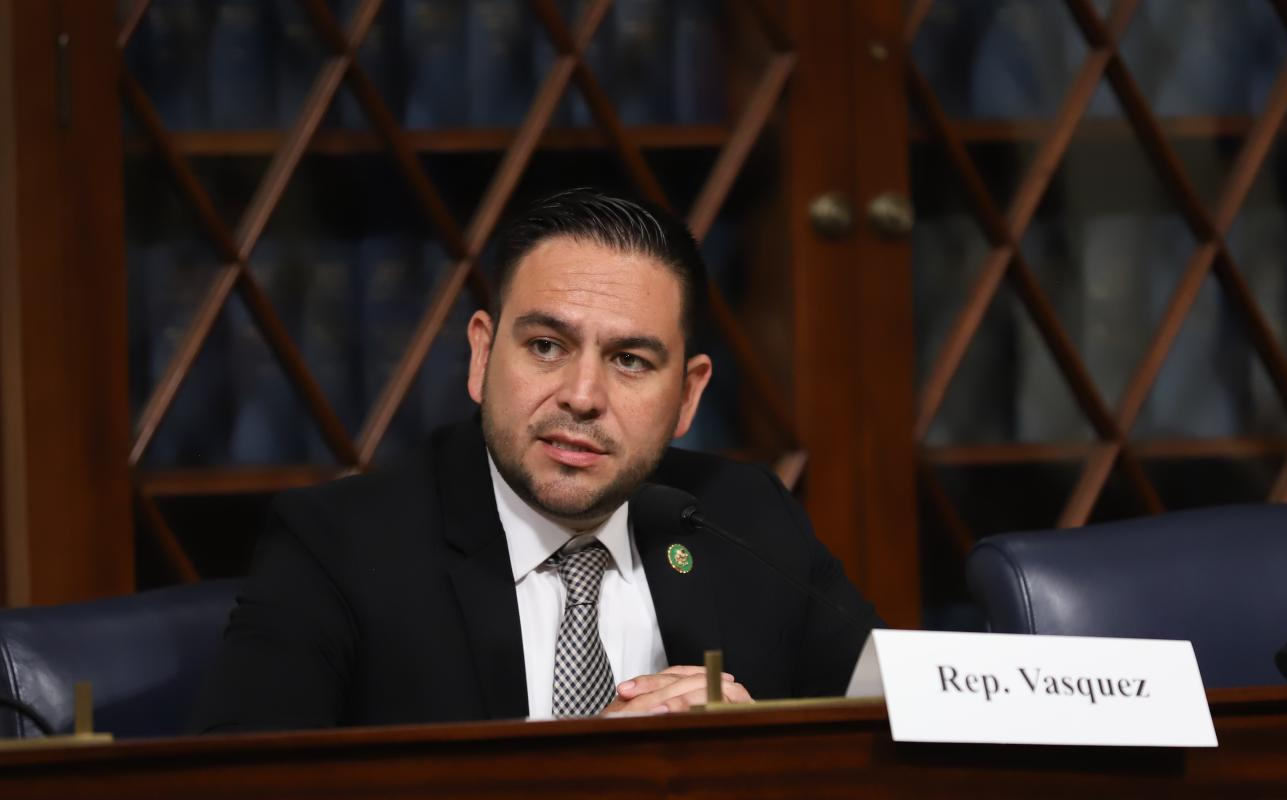
Vasquez on the Committee of Armed Services, 2024

For the 119th Congress:

- Committee on Agriculture
  - Subcommittee on Conservation, Research, and Biotechnology
  - Subcommittee on Forestry
- Committee on Armed Services
  - Subcommittee on Readiness
  - Subcommittee on Strategic Forces

=== Caucus memberships ===
Vasquez's caucus memberships include:

- New Democrat Coalition
- Congressional Hispanic Caucus
- Congressional Equality Caucus
- Southwest Caucus (co-founder)
- Congressional Wildlife Refuge Caucus (vice chair)
- Future Forum

== Electoral history ==
=== 2022 ===
2022 New Mexico's 2nd congressional district election
Party	Candidate	Votes	%
Democratic	Gabe Vasquez	96,986	50.3
Republican	Yvette Herrell (incumbent)	95,636	49.6
Democratic	Eliseo Luna (write-in)	51	0.03
Total votes		192,673	100.0
Democratic gain from Republican			

=== 2024 ===
2024 New Mexico's 2nd congressional district election
Party	Candidate	Votes	%
Democratic	Gabe Vasquez (incumbent)	138,177	52.1
Republican	Yvette Herrell	127,145	47.9
Total votes		265,322	100.0
Democratic hold			

== See also ==
- List of Hispanic and Latino Americans in the United States Congress
- List of Latino Democrats

U.S. House of Representatives
Preceded by Yvette Herrell	Member of the U.S. House of Representatives from New Mexico's 2nd congressional district 2023–present	Incumbent
U.S. order of precedence (ceremonial)
Preceded by Derrick Van Orden	United States representatives by seniority 354th	Succeeded by Jennifer McClellan
