= United States military bands =

Musical ensembles maintained by US uniformed services

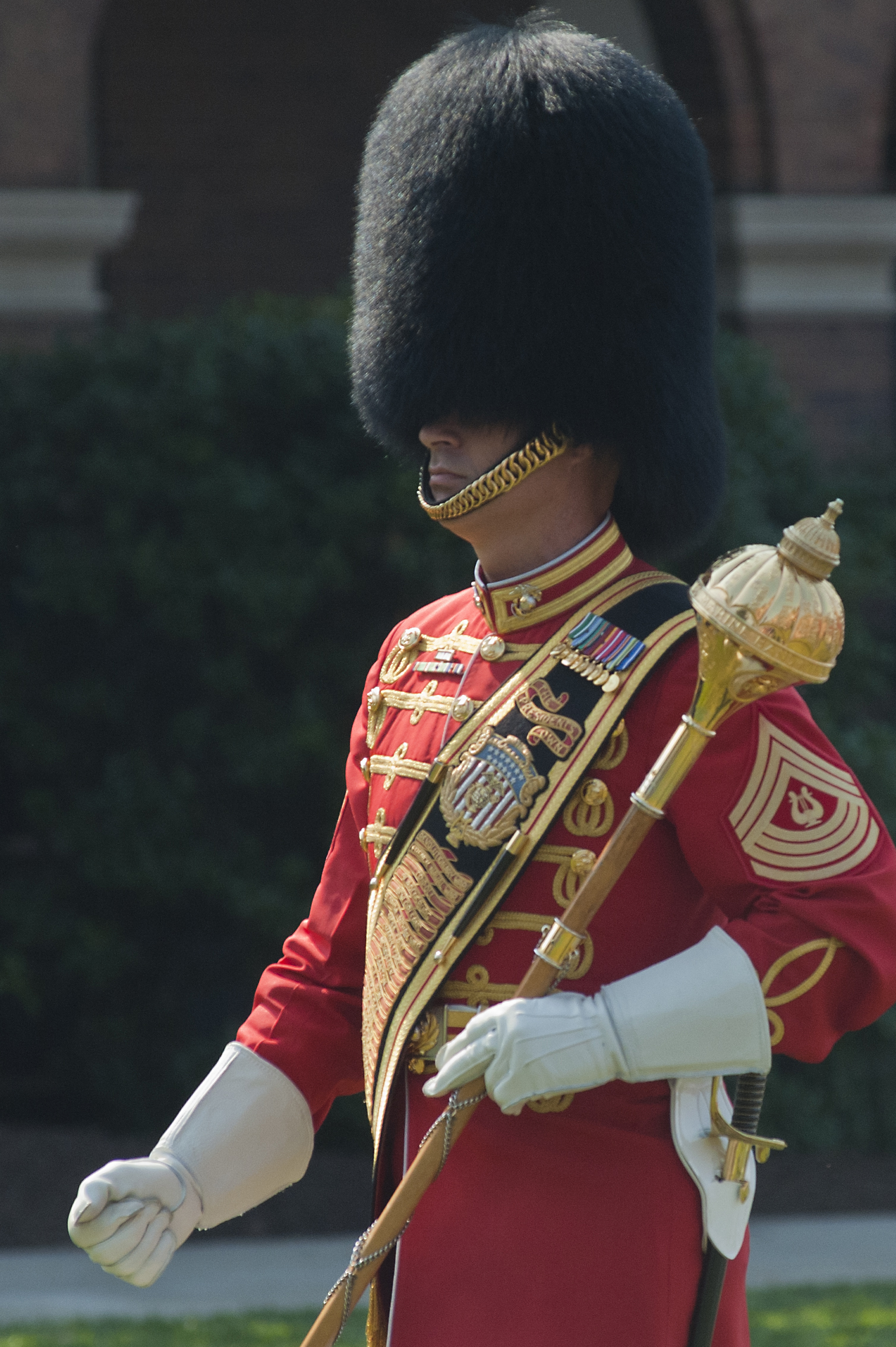
A drum-major of the "President's Own" U.S. Marine Band pictured in 2011

United States military bands include musical ensembles maintained by the United States Army, United States Marine Corps, United States Navy, United States Air Force, and United States Coast Guard. More broadly, they can also include musical ensembles of other federal and state uniformed services, including the Public Health Service and NOAA Corps, the state defense forces, and the senior military colleges.

During the colonial period, most British army units posted in the area that would become the United States had bands attached. The first recorded instance of a local American military band was in 1653 in the New Hampshire militia. The oldest extant United States military band is the United States Marine Corps Band, formed in 1798 and known by the moniker "The President's Own". The U.S. armed forces field eleven ensembles and more than 100 smaller, active-duty and reserve bands.

Bands provide martial music during official events including state arrivals, military funerals, ship commissioning, and change of command and promotion ceremonies; they conduct public performances in support of military public relations and recruitment activities such as street parades and concerts; and they provide popular music groups to entertain deployed military personnel. Most bands of the U.S. armed forces reconfigure into combat units during wartime during which they have non-musical responsibilities, including guarding prisoners of war and defending command centers.

Unlike Canada, the United Kingdom, and some other nations, the United States federal armed forces do not maintain any "voluntary bands", or bands composed of unpaid civilian musicians who dress in military uniforms. All U.S. military bands are composed of regularly enlisted or commissioned military personnel. One exception to this is the United States Coast Guard Pipe Band, which is drawn from the U.S. Coast Guard Auxiliary.

== History ==
=== Before independence ===
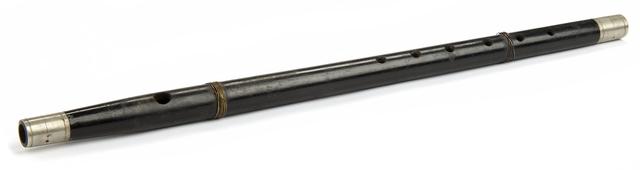
For more than 100 years, American martial music was based around the fife.

For hundreds of years, military forces have used music to signal their troops.

Evidence of the attachment of musicians to military units operating in what would become the United States dates to 1633, when colonial Virginia militia employed drummers to beat marching cadences during drills and maneuvers. According to research by the U.S. Armed Forces School of Music, the first complete military band in the American colonies was organized in New Hampshire in 1653 with an instrumentation of 15 oboes and two drums. The exposure of Americans to martial music increased with the growth of the number of British Army units being rotated through the colonies; most British infantry regiments had military musicians attached, consisting of both field music units that sounded signals during combat, as well as "Bands of Musick" that performed for special and ceremonial occasions.

=== War for independence ===
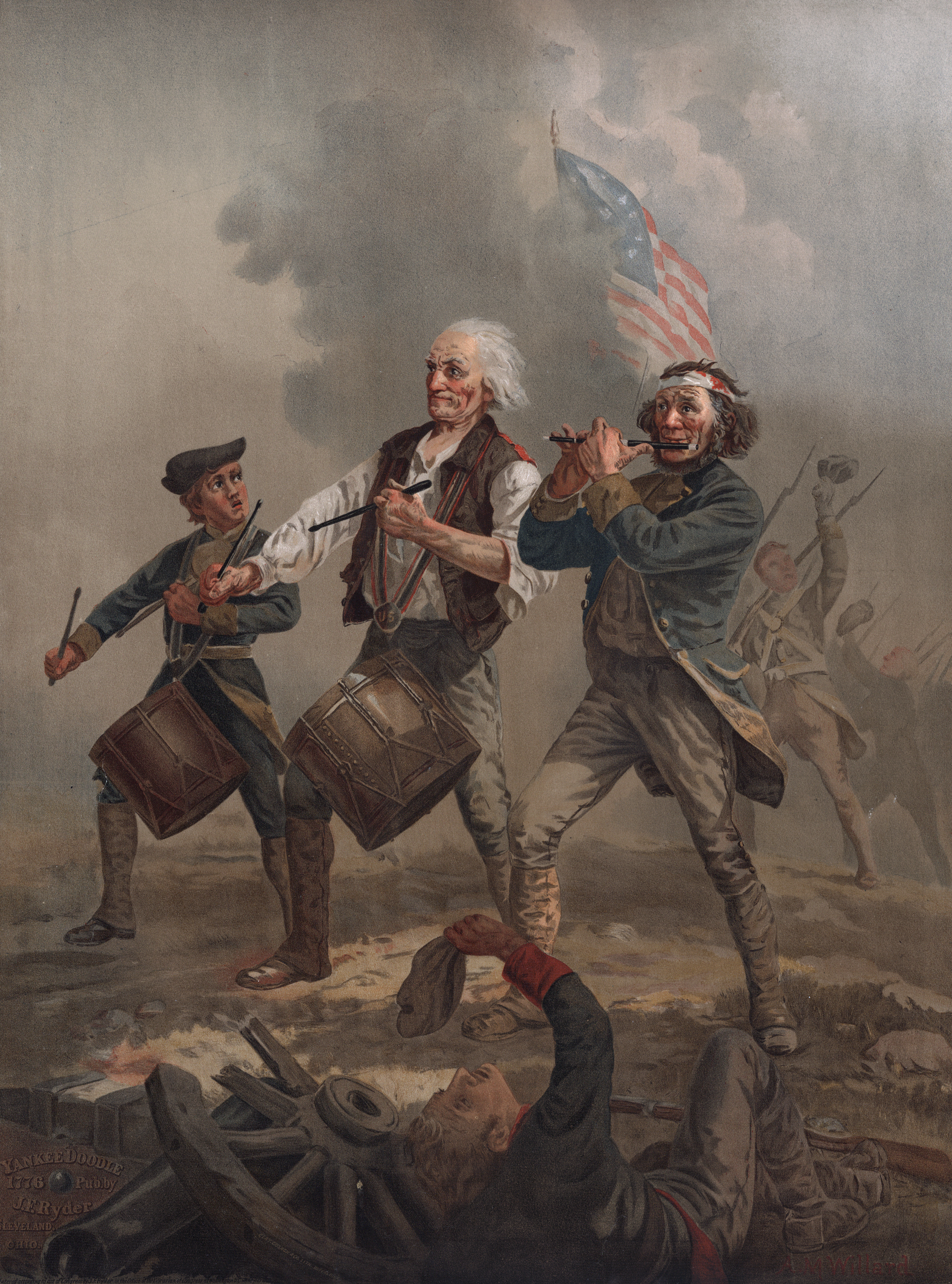
Early American military music was centered around the fife, with brass instruments only slowly adopted.

At the outset of the American Revolution, United States military units primarily relied on fife and drum corps for musical support. Americans were first introduced to the bugle horn (forerunner to the modern bugle) during the Battle of Harlem Heights, when British infantry used the instrument, causing Joseph Reed to later recall, "the enemy appeared in open view, and sounded their bugles in a most insulting manner, as is usual after a fox chase. I never felt such a sensation before—it seemed to crown our disgrace." Some American cavalry units adopted bugle horns during the war, however, a shortage of brass in the Thirteen Colonies largely limited use of the instrument to the opposing British and German forces, with American troops continuing to rely heavily on fifes, drums, and even – at the Battle of Saratoga – turkey calls. Among the most noted American military musicians during the revolutionary period was Barzillai Lew whose fifing during the bloody Battle of Bunker Hill has been credited with keeping troop morale high.

The end of the revolution came "the end of everything military" in the United States and it was not until 1798, with the establishment of the U.S. Marine Corps, that military music returned in an organized fashion. In the enabling legislation authorizing the creation of the Marines, Congress authorized the funding of a Drum-Major, Fife Major and 32 musicians. This band, the U.S. Marine Band, as of 2020 remains the oldest extant military music organization in the United States and, indeed, the oldest professional musical ensemble in that nation.

The establishment of regular U.S. armed forces brought with it a standardization of uniforms. Federal soldiers and Marines wore a variety of uniforms based around the basic color blue with the exception of bandsmen whose uniforms were patterned in red to allow them to be more easily identifiable to field commanders who would need them to signal his orders to troops. The use of red in musician's uniforms is maintained to varying degrees by U.S. military bands today, as seen in the uniforms of the U.S. Marine Corps Band, the U.S. Marine Drum and Bugle Corps, the Old Guard Fife and Drum Corps of the 3rd Infantry Regiment, and in the peaked hats of the U.S. Army Band which are colored red in contrast to the standard U.S. Army blue design.

The modern bugle was first introduced to American military units around the time of the War of 1812. During that conflict, only the Rifle Regiment was authorized to use the bugle. All other American forces were required to continue using the traditional American fife. Gradually, however, bugles became more widely adopted by the United States military.

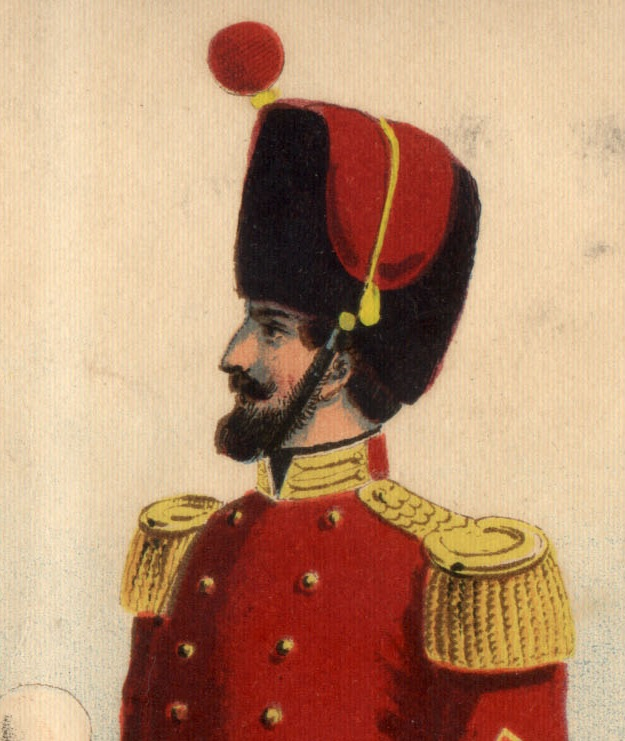
An early iteration of the U.S. Marine Band's bearskin helmet, shown in the 1859 uniform regulations

In 1855, United States Marine Band director Francesco Scala adopted the bearskin helmet for that band's drum-major in emulation of European trends. This transition occurred as the band was reorganizing itself from a traditional American fife and drum corps into its modern incarnation and the style later became popular headgear used by many military band drum-majors in the United States. (A shortage of bearskins in the late 1880s caused the price of the hats to skyrocket, with the New York Times then reporting their use might be phased out entirely. "It can readily be seen what a price has to be paid for keeping up a custom which is rather old, it is true, but is practically a useless one save for the purpose of military display," the newspaper opined.)

=== Civil War ===
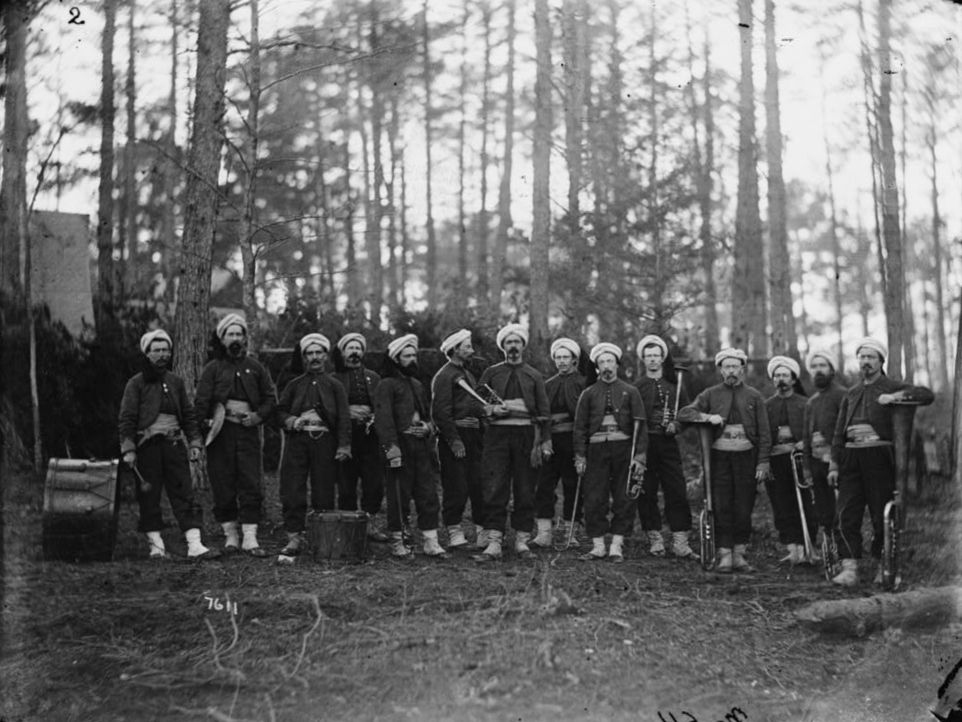
The regimental band of the 114th Pennsylvania Infantry in zouave uniform, pictured in 1864

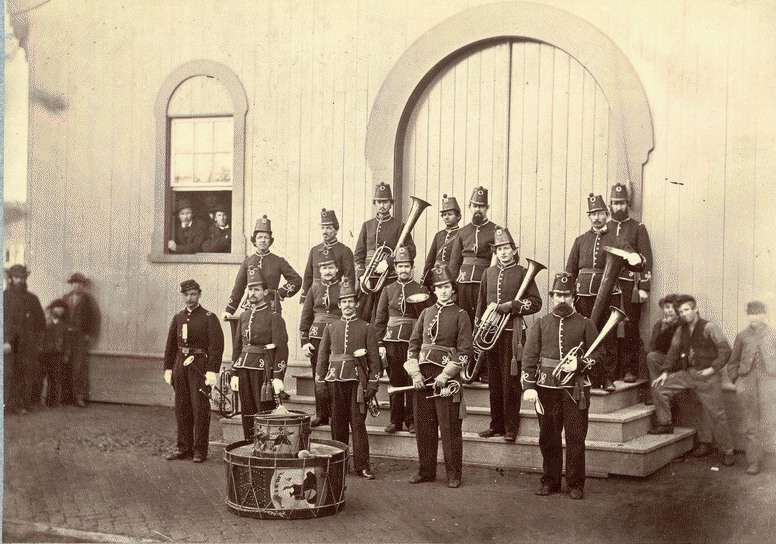
Band for the 10th Veteran Reserve Corps during the American Civil War

At the time of the American Civil War, U.S. Army bands had a normal strength of 24 musicians for infantry units, and 16 for cavalry. With the mobilization of the Union Army, transition to total war, and decreasing importance of bands in signaling troops, the United States Department of War in 1861 considered cutting military bands entirely, estimated a potential cost savings of $5 million. The proposal was shelved in the face of opposition from officers and soldiers, however, a trimming of bandsmen occurred by eliminating some regimental ensembles in favor of brigade-level bands. Nonetheless, a survey in October 1861 found that 75-percent of Union regiments had a band and, by December of that year, the Union Army had 28,000 musicians in 618 bands. Bandsmen were also, for the first time, tasked with performing combat duties in addition to musical performance, frequently as stretcher-bearers and field hospital orderlies.

Musicians were often given special privileges. Union general Phillip Sheridan gave his cavalry bands the best horses and special uniforms, believing "music has done its share, and more than its share, in winning this war". In addition to ceremonial and maneuver music, bands during this period also began performing concerts for troops with the popular music of the day, many regimental bands having formerly been civilian bands that enlisted en masse at the outbreak of hostilities. John Partridge, a soldier in the 24th Massachusetts Volunteer Regiment, recorded in a letter home the value the men in his unit placed on the regimental band, formerly a civilian orchestra from Boston led by Patrick Gilmore:

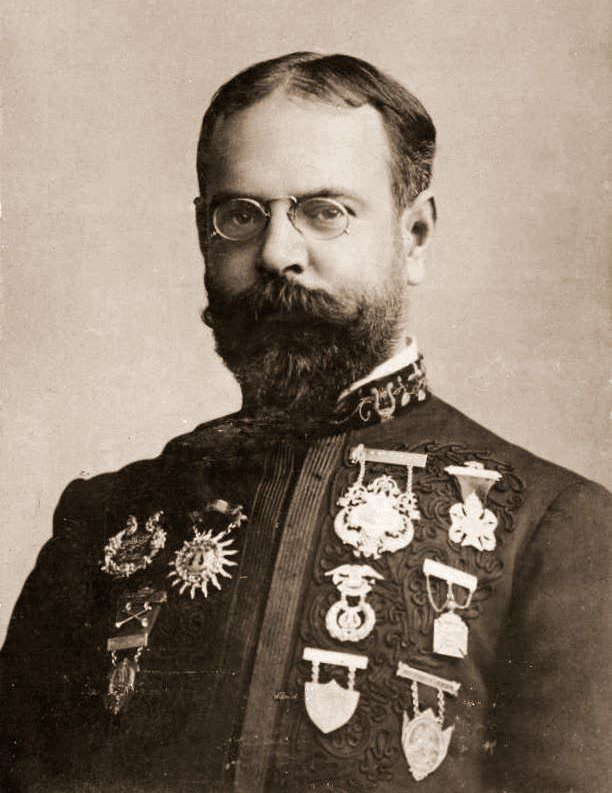
John Philip Sousa, pictured here in the 1880s as commander of the U.S. Marine Band, is credited as America's greatest composer of martial music.

I don't know what we should have done without our band ... every night about sundown Gilmore gives us a splendid concert, playing selections from operas and some very pretty marches, quick steps, waltzes and the like ... thus you can see we get a good deal of new music, notwithstanding we are off here in the woods. Gilmore used to give some of the most fashionable concerts we had at home and we lack nothing but strings now.

=== March music era (1870 to 1900) ===
In the post-war era, aided by the large body of work being created by prolific American composers such as John Philip Sousa, Henry Filmore and Edwin Eugene Bagley, American military and military-like bands became known for performing a unique style of quick-tempo marches with thundering brass and heavy percussion. One music critic, writing about the Boston Jubilee of 1872, contrasted the "velvety smoothness" of the invited Band of the Grenadier Guards to the follow-up performance orchestrated by U.S. Army bandmaster-general Patrick Gilmore which involved "a heterogeneous choir of nearly twenty thousand, an orchestra of about a thousand instrumentalists of decidedly mixed abilities, an organ blown by steam power ... a drum of the most preposterous magnitude, and a few batteries of artillery."

Beginning in the 1880s, the United States Army Corps of Engineers maintained a band at the U.S. Army Engineer School (then the Engineers School at Willets Point, New York). Then, it was led by Julius Hamper, a Swiss immigrant and conductor. It was dissolved in the early 1900s after over 20 years of service in Washington D.C.

=== 20th century to present ===
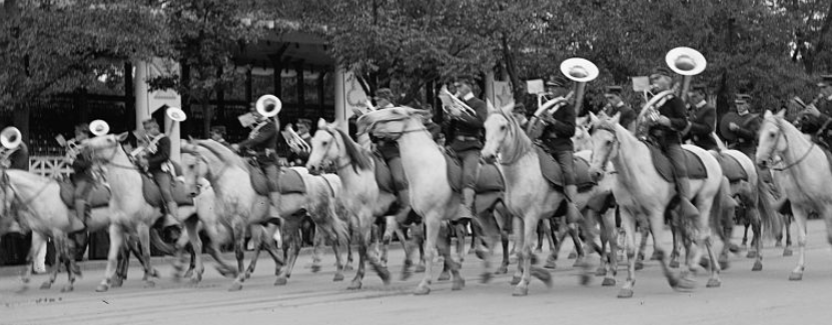
The mounted band of the 2nd U.S. Cavalry leads the parade at the 1902 encampment of the Grand Army of the Republic.

By the early 1900s, military bands were being established in the far-flung reaches of the American colonial empire. Most notable among them was the Philippine Constabulary Band under the direction of Walter Loving. The group, described by Army and Navy Life as "one of the finest of all military bands in the world," and credited with John Philip Sousa as being equal in quality to the U.S. Marine Band, led the 1909 U.S. presidential inauguration parade, the first time a band other than "The President's Own" had done so.

During World War I, the U.S. armed forces experienced a great influx of professional civilian musicians resulting, in part, from the mobilization of 27 African-American regiments to augment the U.S. Army's existing four Black regiments. The regimental bands of these newly formed units were frequently led by Black blues and jazz musicians experienced performing in the clubs of New York and Chicago. Among them was James Reese Europe, whose 369th Regiment band (the "Harlem Hellfighters Band") is credited with introducing jazz to Europe. Regimental bands during this time varied greatly in size and quality and "intensive recruiting by an ambitious colonel with a band fund and an able conductor might coax a significant number of voluntary enlistments and result in a flexible, professional-quality ensemble."

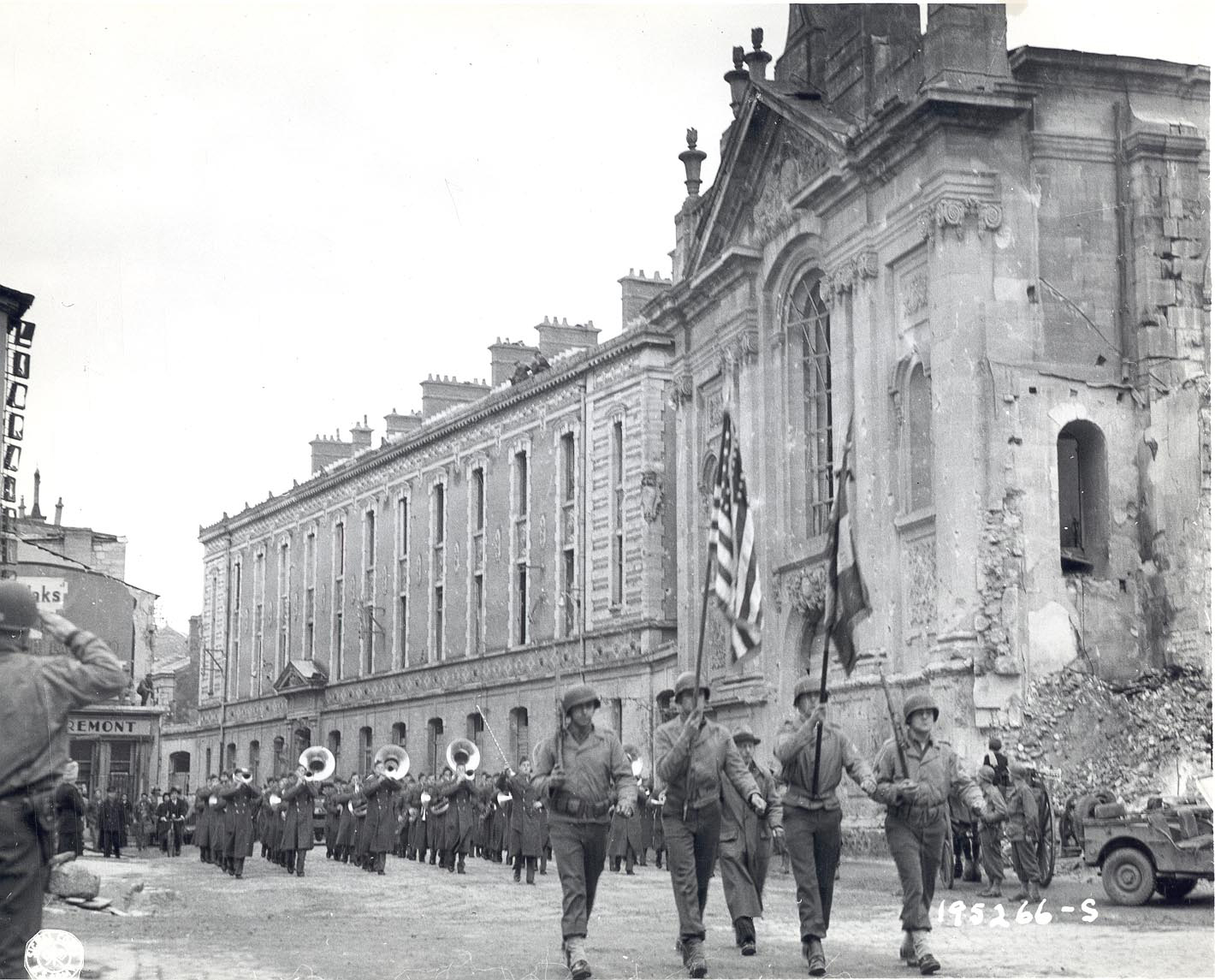
A U.S. Army band leads the entrance of American troops into Verdun, France in 1944.

During World War II, the Women's Army Corps (WAC) formed female military bands to perform for departing and arriving troops, on training bases in the U.S., and as part of war bond drives, including the 404th Armed Service Forces Band, the only all-Black all-female band in U.S. military history.

During World War II, the US Army Air Forces recruited Glenn Miller to lead its band. This resulted in a tradition of USAF bands often using contemporary music to entertain and inspire airmen. This history was reflected in the motion picture The Glenn Miller Story.

In 1949, the U.S. Air Force established the USAF Drum and Bugle Corps and a USAF Pipe Band. The former group continued until it was eliminated in 1961 as a cost-cutting measure. The USAF Pipe Band was deactivated nine years later, in 1970.

By the 20th century, military music had effectively ceased to be an integral part of combat operations with the existence of military bands becoming a function of public duties and troop morale and welfare. Occasional exceptions existed, however. One later example of the use of a band in combat occurred during the Vietnam War when U.S. Army Major-General John Hay ordered the 1st Infantry Division band to march down a road held by the North Vietnamese Army (NVA) while playing the "Colonel Bogey March". NVA forces were, reportedly, so confused by the impromptu parade that they withdrew from the area, allowing American infantry to seize the road without opposition.

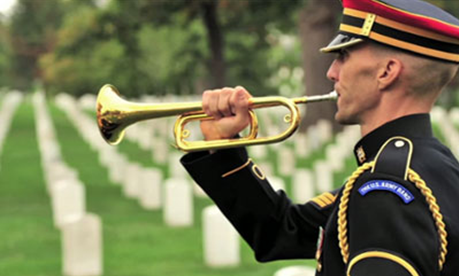
A U.S. Army bugler performs "Taps" at Arlington National Cemetery.

In 1992, Senator Sam Nunn – fighting to stop closures of U.S. military bases in his home state as part of the peace dividend – instead suggested elimination of military bands that support the U.S. Military Academy, U.S. Naval Academy, and U.S. Air Force Academy. Nunn said that cadets and midshipmen should volunteer to form their own bands instead, which would save the U.S. up to $10 million. Representatives of service academies responded by explaining that, due to the unique nature of cadet life relative to student life at civilian universities, it would not be practical for volunteer ensembles to replace the academy bands. The proposal ultimately became stalled in a larger debate about trimming $1 billion from the Strategic Defense Initiative and did not move forward.

In 2011, Rep. Betty McCollum, responding to a proposal she opposed that would curb funding for the Corporation for Public Broadcasting, called for 40-percent of military band budgets to be slashed. McCollum's suggestion was decried by the Fleet Reserve Association and described by the National Association for Music Education as "potentially devastating". The McCollum bill was initially defeated, but reintroduced by the congresswoman a second time, when it narrowly passed with bipartisan support. It was ultimately dropped by the U.S. Senate. In 2012, McCollum again attempted to defund military music programs by reintroducing her amendment. In an effort to preempt further action by McCollum, the U.S. Air Force proactively disbanded the Band of the Air Force Reserve, the Band of the Pacific-Alaska, and the Band of Liberty. At the time of its deactivation, the Band of the Air Force Reserve was the Air Force's oldest musical ensemble, founded in 1941 as the First Air Force Band of the U.S. Army Air Corps. In addition to the three active-duty bands, six of what were then eleven Air National Guard bands were also deactivated.

In 2016, U.S. Representative Martha McSally introduced an amendment to the defense spending bill to remove $430 million in funding for military bands to eliminate their performance at concerts, parades, dinners, and other public events. The amendment passed the House of Representatives on a voice vote. McSally said military bands would still be allowed to play at military funerals and certain ceremonies. The amendment was dropped from the defense appropriation bill passed by the Senate.

== Customs and traditions ==
=== Eagle drums ===
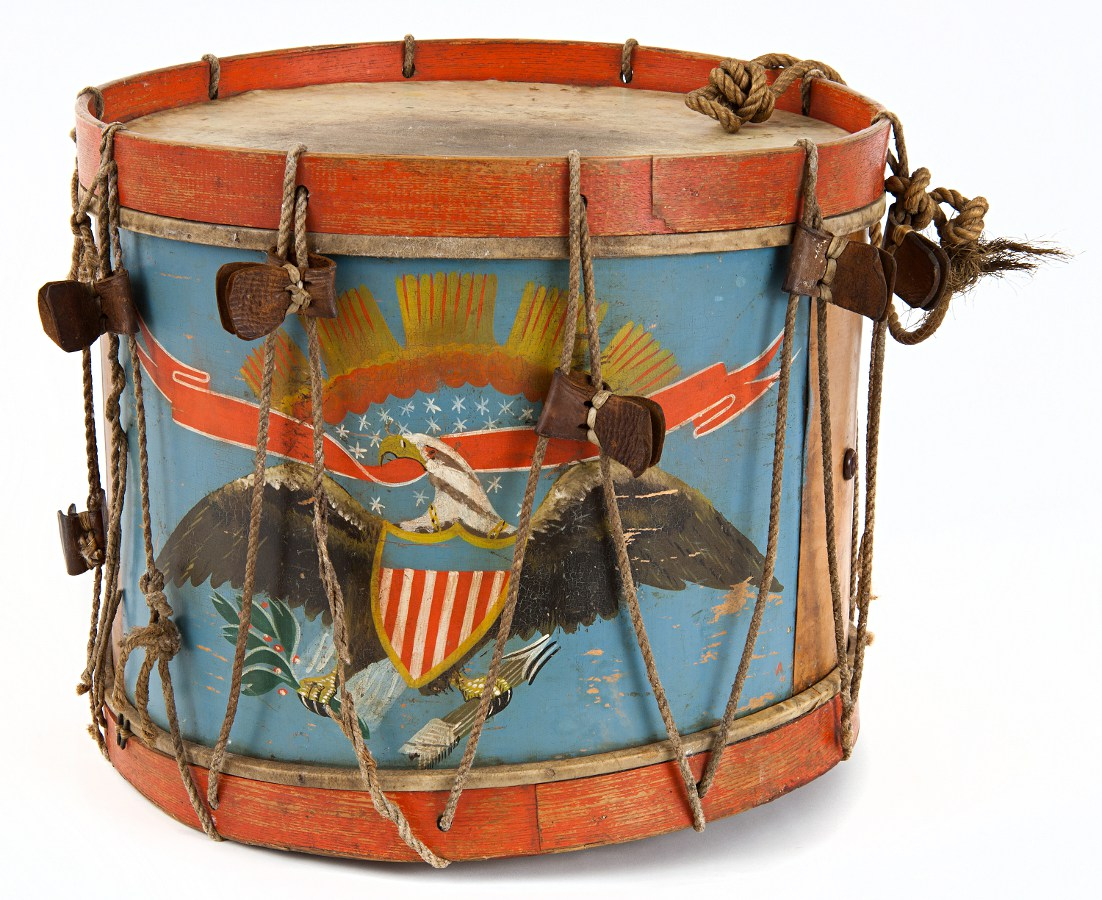
Civil War-era (1861 – 1865) wooden snare drum. The device on the front of the shell is a Federal eagle below a sunburst motif.

During the American Revolution, some military units, lacking heraldic insignia, painted eagles on the facing of their drums (in the British custom a regiment's armorial achievement would be used to decorate drums). This tradition continued after the war, and the decoration of drums with eagles in various poses, often dictated by the tastes of the individual band, continued. By the War of 1812, eagles were required to be painted on a blue ground for infantry units and red for artillery, though the design of eagles remained a largely individual art. Beginning in the 1840s, the U.S. Army attempted to standardize the eagles used on drums and, by the Civil War, stencils were issued to bands to apply the authorized designs, though some flair continued in the finishing and painting of the final product. With the later establishment of the Army Institute of Heraldry, eagle drums were phased out in favor of drum designs emblazoned with distinctive unit insignia, a return to the British tradition. Today, The U.S. Army Field Band and the U.S. Army Band "Pershing's Own" use "eagle drums". Those drums feature an eagle design created by Gus Moeller known as "the Grand Republic".

=== Regalia ===
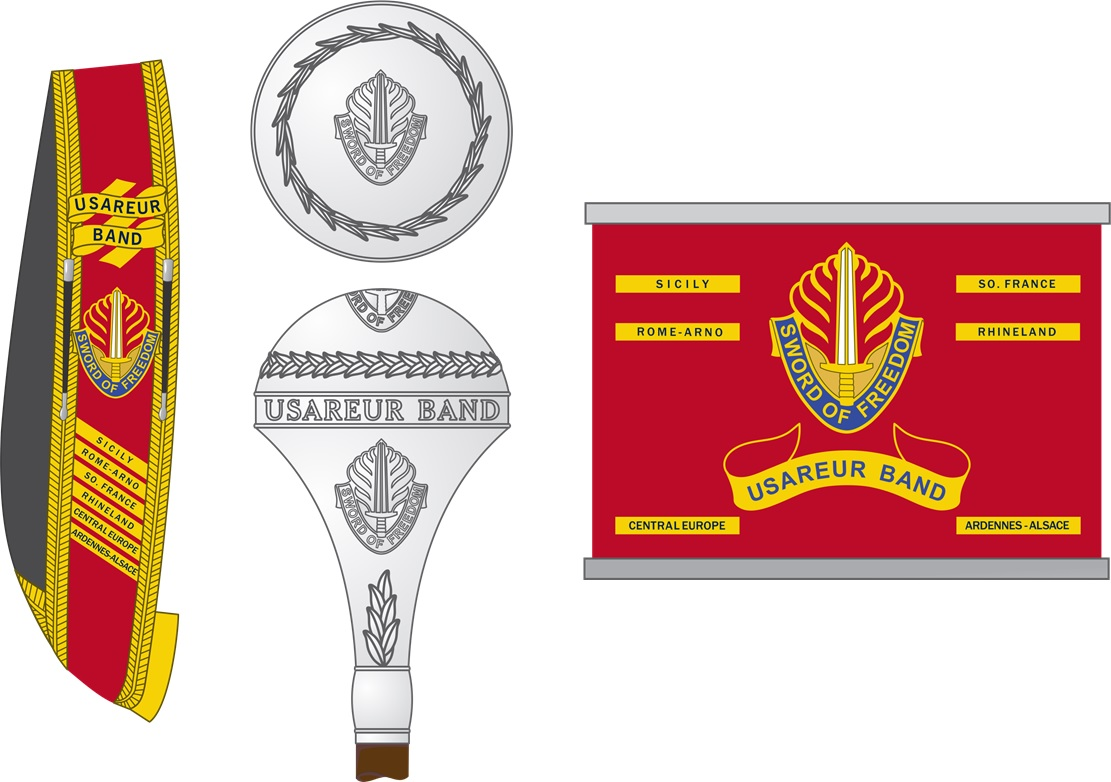
The regalia of the U.S. Army Europe Band, showing (left to right) the baldric, mace, and drum wrap

Most U.S. military bands are issued a set of regalia, which typically include a baldric worn by the Drum-Major charged with the distinctive unit insignia of the unit to which the band is assigned and, frequently, other symbols as well such as miniature campaign streamers; a chrome mace carried by the Drum-Major and engraved with the unit's name; and a special mural unique to the unit used to wrap the band's drums.

In most bands, the drum majors often augment their uniforms with bearskin helmets and white leather gauntlets. Others wear the peaked cap instead.

=== Unit marches ===
Some U.S. Army units have officially recognized unit marches. Army units with attached bands can adopt a unit march or song at the request of the commanding officer and approval of the United States Army Center of Military History. Units with official marches and songs include the 1st Infantry Division ("Big Red One Song"), the 3rd Armored Division ("Spearhead Song"), the 7th Infantry Division ("New Arirang March"), and the 3rd Infantry Division ("Dogface Soldier") among others.

== Ensembles ==
=== Premier ensembles ===
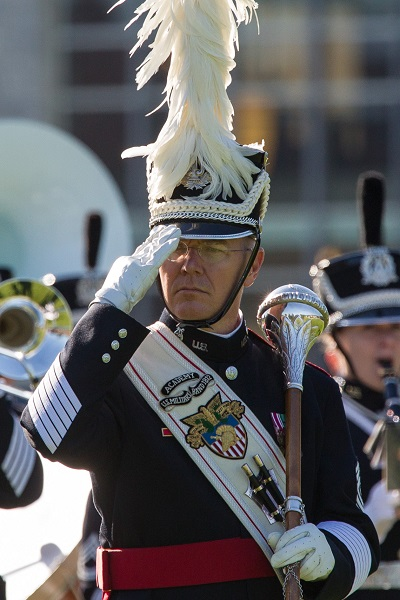
The West Point Band, a premier ensemble, passes in review.

A U.S. military premier ensemble is a military band given special status within the U.S. armed forces. Such groups are configured and commanded in a way intended to attract the highest-quality musicians available and competition for enlistment is typically fierce. Unlike non-premier ensembles, which provide musical support to specific military units or commands, premier ensembles exist to promote the U.S. military to the public at-large and to preserve the heritage of American martial music through over two centuries. There are currently eleven such groups.

=== Unit bands ===
==== Army ====
In addition to its four premier ensembles, the U.S. Army fields 25 active-duty bands assigned as unit ensembles to support divisions, corps, and armies. A further 17 part-time U.S. Army Reserve and 44 part-time National Guard bands are also maintained.

During combat operations, Army bands reconfigure as light infantry units responsible for reinforcing military police "by performing command post security, all-source production section security, and perimeter security for the division EPW central collecting point and EPW holding area."

==== Marine Corps ====
In addition to its two premier ensembles, the U.S. Marine Corps also maintains ten, 50-person field bands: the Quantico Marine Band (Quantico, VA), the 2d Marine Aircraft Wing Band (Cherry Point, NC), the 2d Marine Division Band (Camp Lejeune, NC), the Parris Island Marine Band (Parris Island, SC), the Marine Forces Reserve Band (New Orleans, LA), the 1st Marine Division Band (Camp Pendleton, CA), the 3rd Marine Aircraft Wing Band (Miramar, CA), Marine Band San Diego (San Diego, CA), the Marine Forces Pacific Band (Kaneohe Bay, HI), and the III Marine Expeditionary Force Band (Okinawa, Japan). Marine Corps field bands, unlike the United States Marine Band "The President's Own" and the U.S. Marine Drum and Bugle Corps "The Commandant's Own", are not mission-exclusive to music. During combat operations, bands are responsible for rear-area defense, reorganizing as the security platoon for the divisional or wing command center, effectively acting as bodyguards for generals in active war zones.

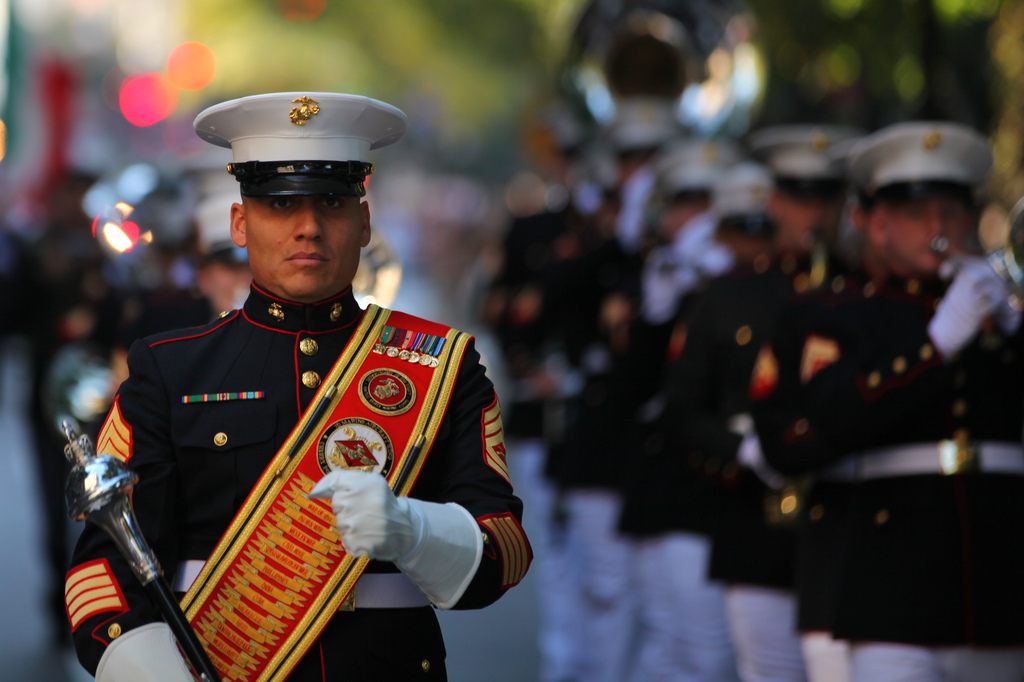
The 2nd Marine Aircraft Wing Band marches down New York's Fifth Avenue during the 2010 Columbus Day Parade. In 2007 the band was deployed to Iraq to provide security at a tactical air control center.

The 10 USMC field bands and "The Commandant's Own" are options for the Marine Corps Musician Enlistment Option Program (MEOP).

==== Navy ====
The Navy has nine "fleet bands" in addition to its two premier ensembles, six of which are located in the Continental United States, the remaining three based in Hawaii, Italy, and Japan. The Navy School of Music at Joint Expeditionary Base Little Creek–Fort Story is responsible for training Navy and Marine Corps musicians.

==== Air Force ====
In addition to its two premier ensembles, the United States Air Force has nine additional active-duty bands:

- The Air Force Band of the West (at Lackland Air Force Base)
- The Air Force Heritage of America Band (at Joint Base Langley-Eustis)
- The Air Force Heartland of America Band (at Offutt Air Force Base)
- The Air Force Band of Mid-America (at Scott Air Force Base)
- The Air Force Band of the Golden West (at Travis Air Force Base)
- The Air Force Band of Flight (at Wright Patterson Air Force Base)
- The Air Force in Europe Band (at Ramstein Air Base)
- The Air Force Band of the Pacific – Asia
- The Air Force Band of the Pacific – Hawaii (at Joint Base Pearl Harbor–Hickam)

Until their dissolution in 2024 there were also five Air National Guard military bands in service.

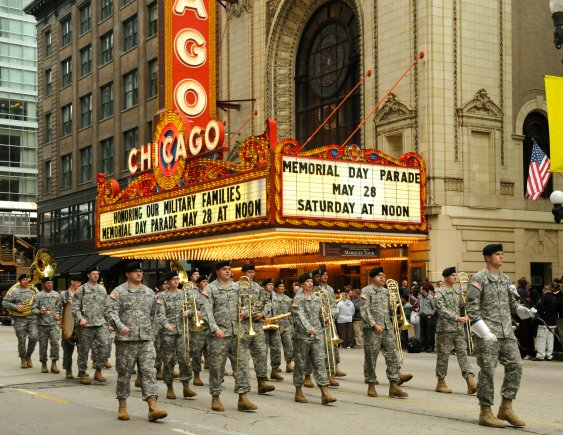
The 144th Illinois National Guard Band during the 2011 Chicago Memorial Day Parade

==== Coast Guard ====
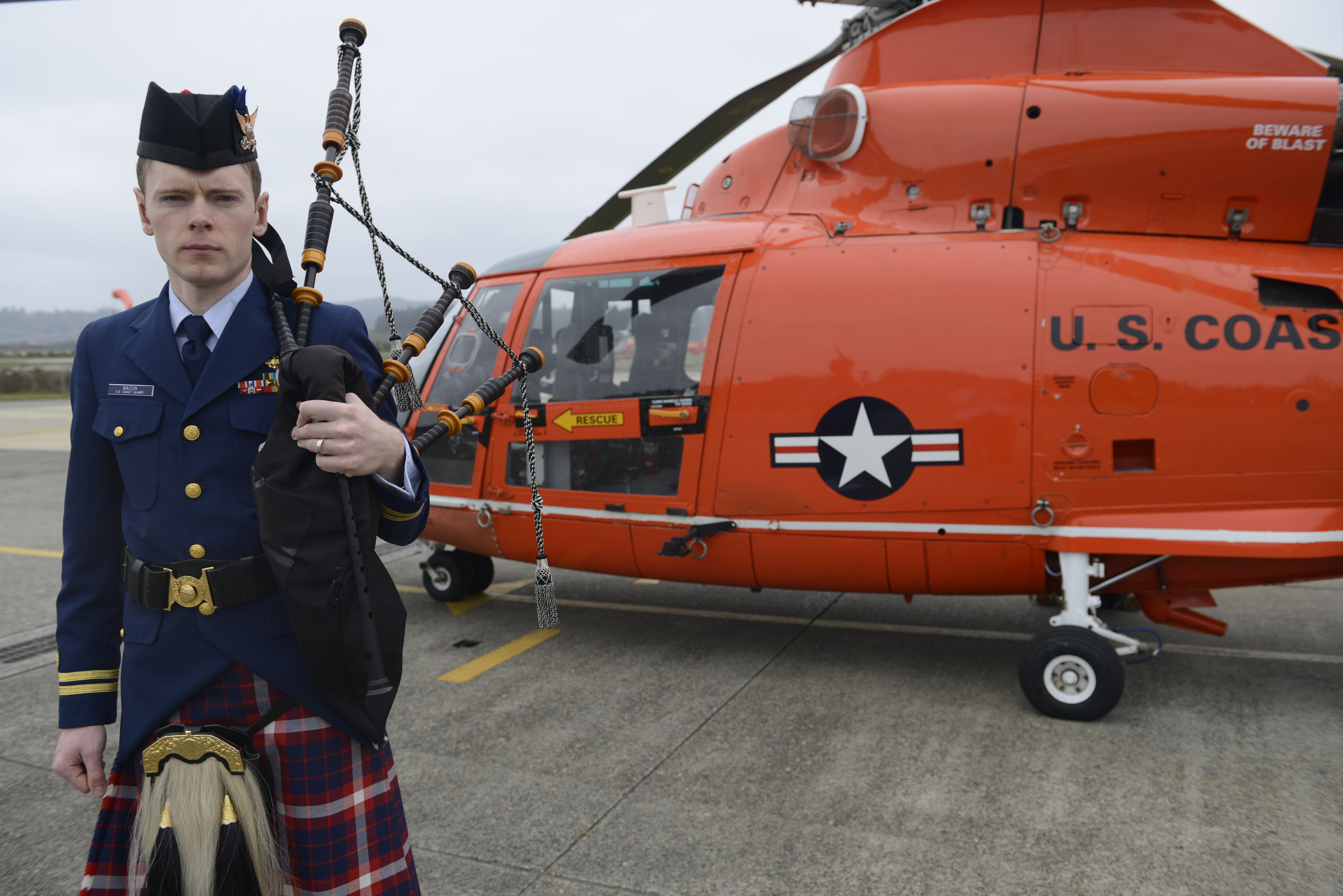
A Coast Guard Pipe Band member pictured in 2015 at Air Station North Bend in Oregon

Though the Coast Guard does not have additional ensembles other than the U.S. Coast Guard Band, the United States Coast Guard Pipe Band is composed of both military and civilian volunteer members providing national, regional, and local musical support to Coast Guard entities and other U.S. military services. The 100 plus member pipe and drum band provides bagpipers and drummers for Coast Guard ship commissioning, change-of-command ceremonies, funerals, and for other public safety related events. Though a privately maintained and funded organization, it operates with special permission from the U.S. Coast Guard that allows it to use the name "Coast Guard." All of its members are either active duty Coast Guard, Coast Guard Reserve, Coast Guard combat veterans, retired from the Coast Guard or members of the U.S. Coast Guard Auxiliary. The band kit consists of a kilt in the Coast Guard tartan, military sporran, and either the Tropical Blue Long dress uniform or the blue uniform shirt with appropriate ribbons and devices. The Arizona Band Flotilla of USCG Auxiliary and Coast Guard Academy "Windjammers" Drum and Bugle Corps are also maintained through private funds.

=== Cadet bands ===
Each of the six senior military colleges, as well as the U.S. Coast Guard Academy and U.S. Merchant Marine Academy, maintain cadet-staffed bands for ceremonial support and performance at athletic events. The band of Norwich University, founded in 1819, is the oldest such group. The Texas A&M University Fightin' Texas Aggie Band is the largest military band in the United States with more than 400 members. The U.S. Merchant Marine Academy is the only federal service academy not to have a co-located full-time ensemble. The student band, known as "George M. Cohan's Own," is the successor to a full-time band that was established at the school during World War II, but later deactivated.

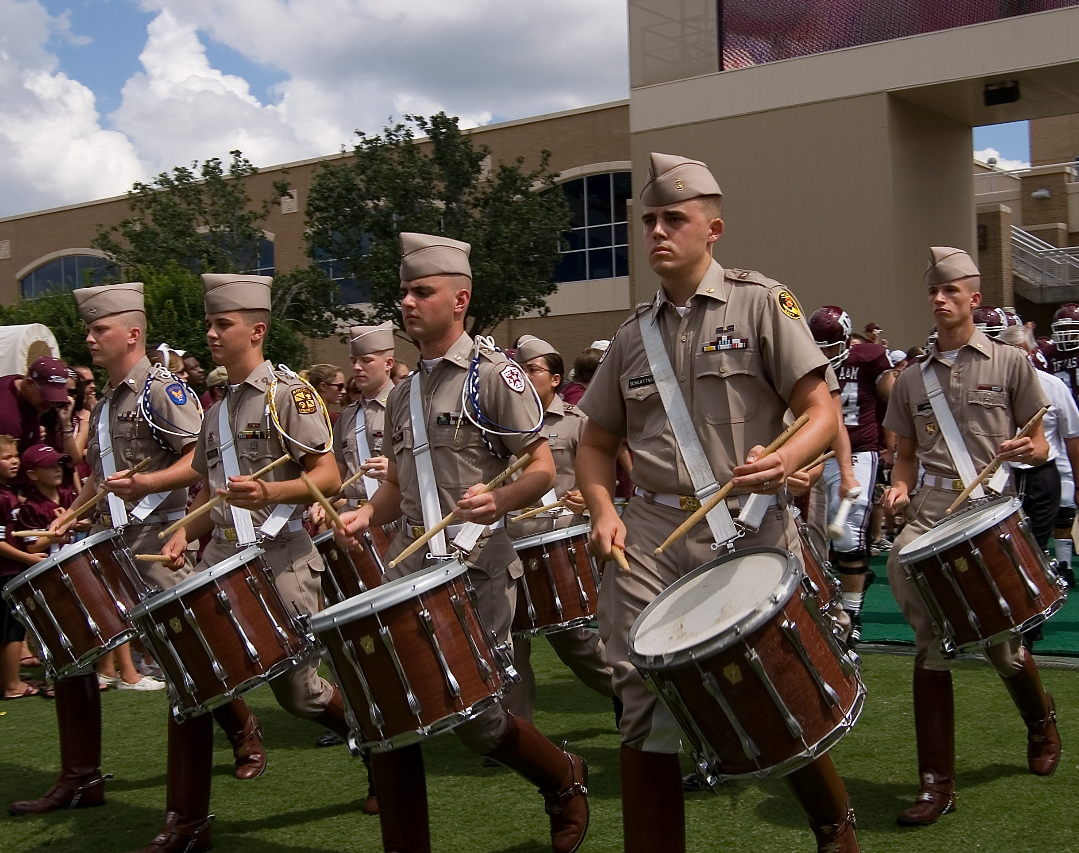
Drummers of the Fightin' Texas Aggie Band pictured in 2007

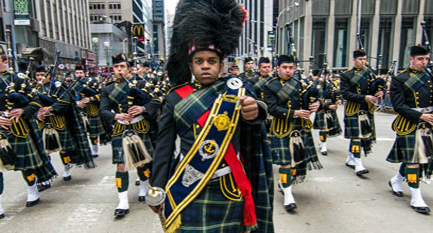
The Naval Academy Pipes and Drums was established in 1996.

Several academies maintain pipe bands. The U.S. Corps of Cadets Pipes and Drums, from the U.S. Military Academy at West Point, was established in 1973, while the U.S. Naval Academy Pipes and Drums was established in 1996 with an endowment from the academy's class of 1961. Both ensembles wear highland dress patterned in their respective service tartans.

The VMI Pipe Band, established in 1997 at the Virginia Military Institute, wears modified highland dress consisting of standard VMI cadet uniforms with kilts patterned in the VMI tartan in lieu of trousers. The Citadels Regimental Pipe Band is composed of between 35 and 40 pipers and drummers. In 1991 it, along with the Citadel's Regimental Band, became the first university military band from the United States to participate in the Royal Edinburgh Military Tattoo.

This is also the case in only three out of the currently four US Military Junior Colleges, all of them sporting military band traditions of their own.

=== Bands of the State Defense Forces and Naval Militias ===
Of the currently active state defense forces in the country, several bands stand out in active service to serve the ceremonial needs of their states, their governments, and legislatures. Among them are the Maryland Defense Force Band, the Georgia State Defense Force Band, 2nd Company Governor's Horse Guards, a mounted band of the New Hampshire Defense Force, and the Bands of the Connecticut State Militia. These bands among others maintain the long tradition of military bands within these services, which they share with the wider Armed Forces and the National Guard.

=== Field music formations (corps of drums and drum and bugle corps) ===
Only the Old Guard Fife and Drum Corps of the United States Army and the United States Marine Drum and Bugle Corps of the United States Marine Corps maintain the long-standing traditions of field music formations within the United States Armed Forces, a tradition currently absent in the SDFs and the National Guard. These formations can be traced back to the long years of British rule, due to the corps of drums made up of fifers and drummers that arrived in what is now the eastern United States together with the infantry regiments of the British Army that arrived in the colonies, together with locally raised militias and local defense regiments later on in the 17th and 18th centuries, and later on in the drum and bugle corps of Army, Marine Corps and Navy units that came in the 19th century.

== Performance gallery ==
Ceremonial performances
The Coast Guard Band leads the Coast Guard Ceremonial Honor Guard as it passes the presidential reviewing stand during the 2009 inaugural parade

The Navy Band Great Lakes plays "The Flag Officers March" to signal the arrival of a Rear Admiral in 2015

The Army Band of the Wild West (191st Army Band) plays "The Generals March" to signal the arrival of Gen. Robert Cone at Fort Hood, Texas in 2009

"Hail to the Chief" preceded by four ruffles and flourishes performed for the entrance of Barack Obama in 2015
Morale and welfare performances
The West Point Band performs "Army Strong" during a concert for the U.S. Military Academy Corps of Cadets in 2012

The U.S. Navy Band performs selections from The Four Seasons for military personnel and their families in 2014

The West Point Band performs "On, Brave Old Army Team" following an Army touchdown at the 2014 Army–Navy Game
Public affairs performances
"Anchors Aweigh" performed by the U.S. Navy Band at the Virginia International Military Tattoo of 2012

The drums of the West Point Band lead the Corps of Cadets during the 2011 New York Veterans Day Parade

== See also ==
- Political debates about United States military bands
- Canadian military bands
- Music of the NOAA Corps
- U.S. Army All-American Marching Band
- United States Army Herald Trumpets
