= Political debates about United States military bands =

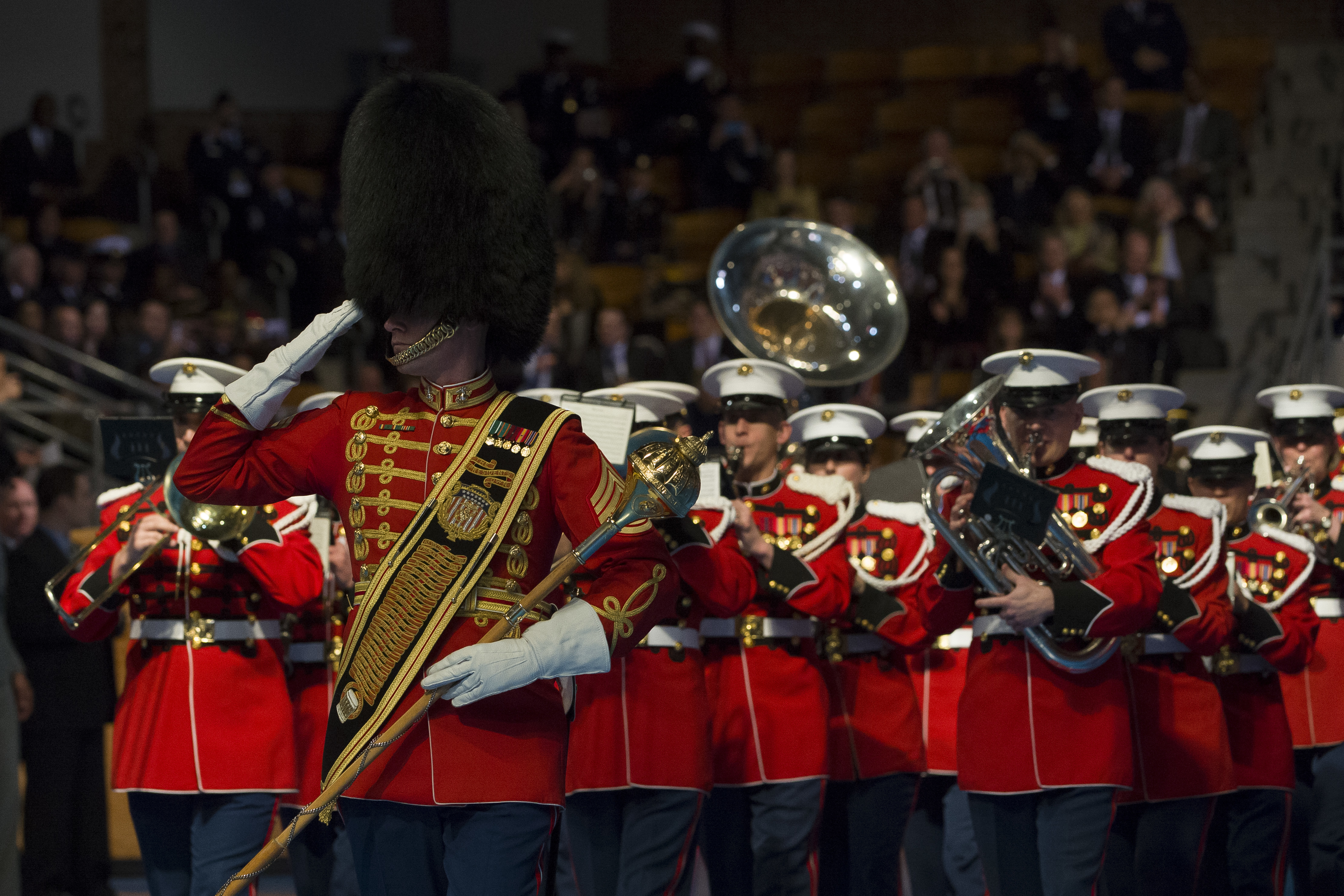
The United States Marine Band

Long considered a sacred cow of American defense spending, U.S. federal military bands have periodically faced the prospect of decreased allocations in military budgets in proposals occasionally floated by lawmakers of the U.S. Democratic and Republican parties. Defunding efforts have generally been opposed by military leadership, veteran's groups, and music educators, and have largely been unsuccessful and short-lived.

== Background ==
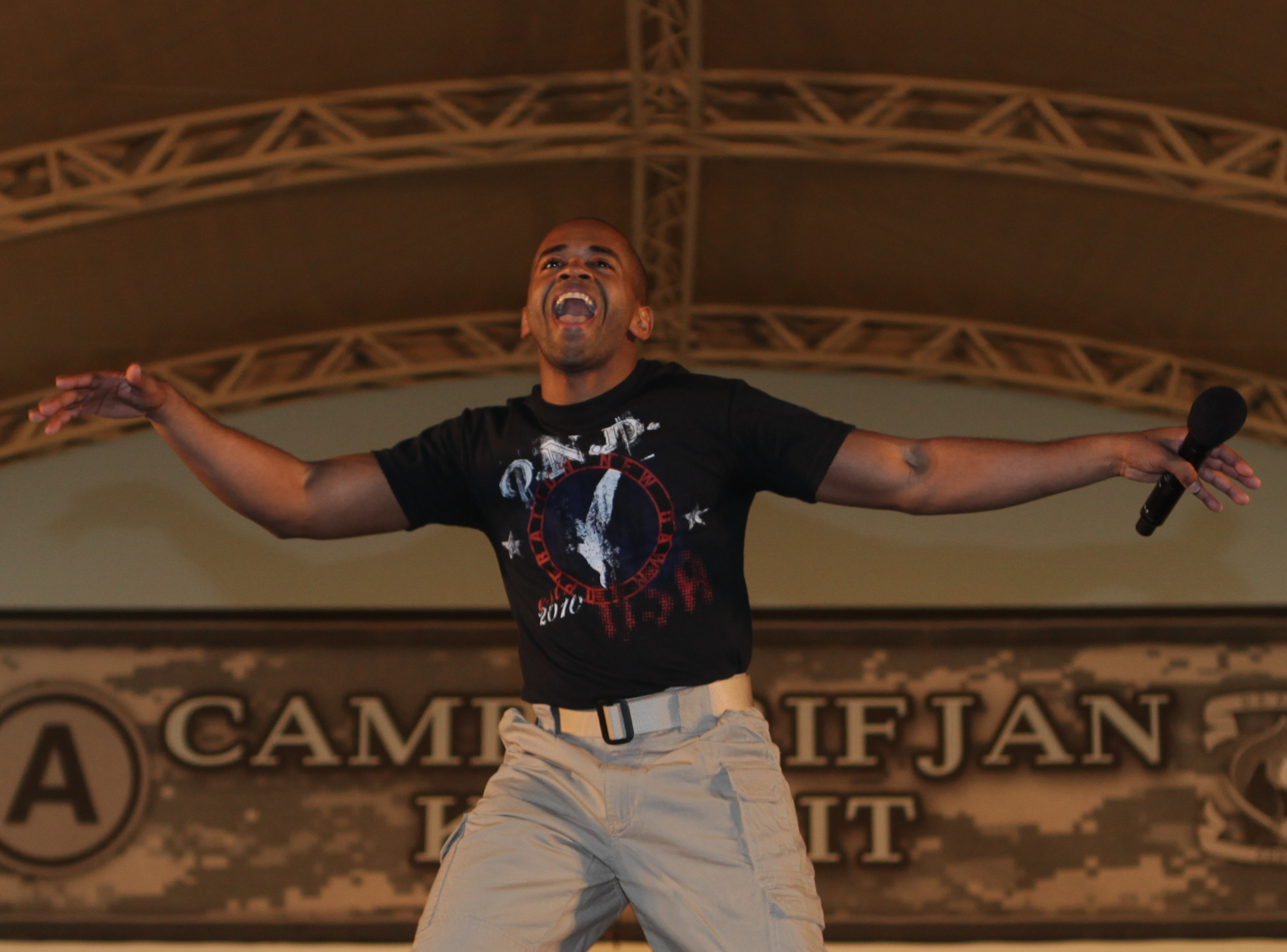
A member of "Downrange" - a rock band composed of musicians from the U.S. Army Band - performs for U.S. troops in Iraq. Soldiers in Army bands can reconfigure from a ceremonial ensemble to smaller, genre-specific groups that provide live entertainment to troops in remote areas and combat theaters with cover songs of popular hits.

The United States has a long tradition of military music; the U.S. Marine Band is the nation's oldest musical ensemble of any genre and military composers, such as John Philip Sousa, have left an indelible impact on the evolution of a distinct musical tradition in the United States. Today, the five branches of the United States armed forces maintain nearly 150 military bands (including active duty units, part-time reserve and National Guard bands, and bands made-up of volunteer service members), with annual spending on music ensembles in excess of $300 million.

Military bands are considered a traditional component of military culture. They provide the required musical accompaniment to the military's public duties responsibilities, including state arrivals, state dinners, military funerals, guard mounting, change-of-command ceremonies, ship christenings, officer commissioning, promotions and medal ceremonies, and tattoos. Most great powers maintain robust bands programs within their national military establishment to support these missions.

In the U.S. bands are also designed to supplement a branch's community relations efforts by projecting a positive image of the U.S. military through performances in parades and other local events. Finally, bands contribute to troop esprit de corps; most U.S. military bands maintain component ensembles with specialized instrumentation including vocalists, guitars, keyboards, and so forth, that allow them to bring live music to entertain deployed troops in idioms including rock, country-western, and jazz.

=== Arguments in support of spending ===
Todd Harrison, a defense budget analyst at the Center for Strategic and Budgetary Studies, has observed that "military bands certainly serve a useful function for ceremonies and other important events," going on to note that the money allocated for military music programs is an attractive political target but, ultimately, incidental within the context of the $700 billion U.S. defense budget.

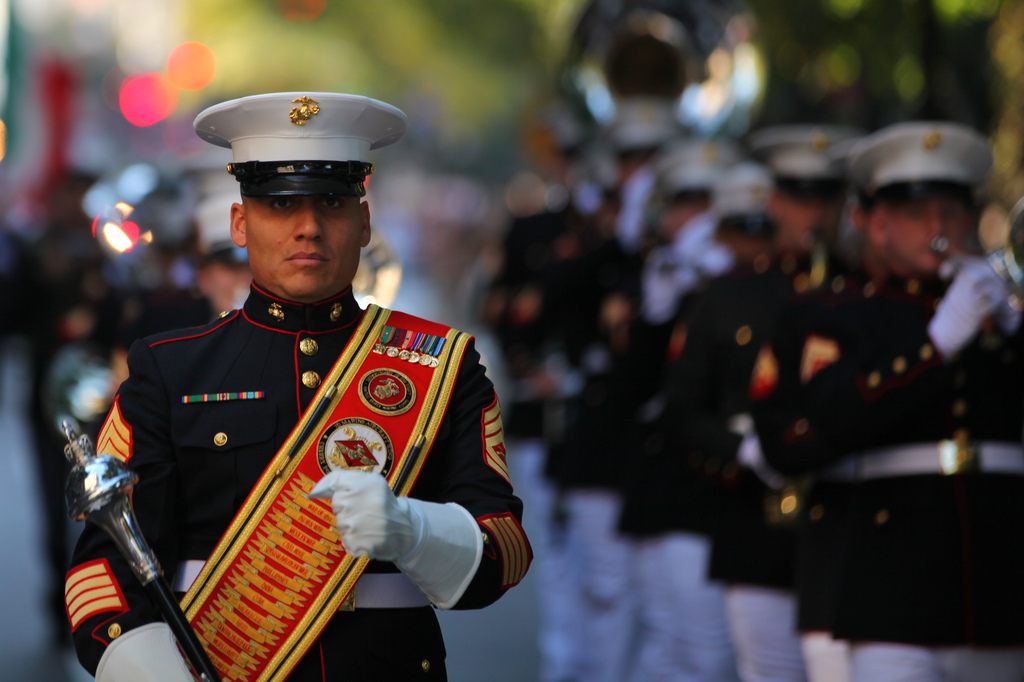
The 2nd Marine Aircraft Wing Band marches down New York's Fifth Avenue during the 2010 Columbus Day Parade. In 2007 the band was deployed to Iraq to provide security at a tactical air control center.

Other have noted that military bands are a customary component of the military's public affairs and community relations efforts, the non-band budgets for which top $4.5 billion. Military bands provide free or low cost support to community organizations by appearing at non-profit events, patriotic observances, and community festivals. The U.S. Army contends that, outside the U.S., bands "serve as representatives of senior commanders in multinational operations or to the host-nation population." One example cited by military officials is the use of "Mo Better Blues," a blues rock band composed of musicians from the 1st Armored Division Band, to entertain Russian Army soldiers during a contentious joint deployment to Bosnia in 1996. At the time, a U.S. State Department liaison officer claimed the band did "more for U.S.-Russian relations in 90 minutes" than he had been able to do in 30 days.

In addition, military musicians are required to support current congressional mandates. For instance, veterans are guaranteed, under federal law, military honors at death, which includes a graveside rendition of Taps by a bugler. However, current staffing levels make it impossible to provide buglers for all of the estimated 633,000 veterans who die each year in the United States, resulting in the use of portable stereos to play recordings of Taps at some funerals, a move that has drawn criticism from veterans advocates.

Finally, some bands - including ten of the Marine Corps' 12 ensembles - have critical duties during wartime, when they are reconfigured as security platoons that can fulfill a variety of missions tasks, such as convoy escort or rear area defense; bands have recently been deployed for combat operations in Iraq and Afghanistan. (This is a situation similar to that of the Corps of Drums in British Army battalions, who have secondary responsibility as the battalion mortar platoon.) A more extreme, albeit atypical, example of the use of a band in a combat situation occurred during the Vietnam War when U.S. Army Major-General John Hay ordered the 1st Infantry Division band to march down a road held by the North Vietnamese Army while playing the Colonel Bogey March. NVA forces were, reportedly, so confused by the impromptu parade that they withdrew from the area, allowing American infantry to follow the band in and capture the road without firing a shot.

=== Arguments against spending ===
Rep. Betty McCollum, a Democrat from Minnesota who has focused much of her time in office working to eliminate bands, has stated that military bands do not enhance national security and are "excessive and a luxury the Pentagon and taxpayers can no longer afford." Brian Bilbray, a Republican from California, has echoed McCollum's position stating that military bands are not essential to national defense.

The conservative advocacy group Citizens Against Government Waste has also supported eliminating military bands, stating that, while cutting funding for bands would have only a nominal impact on government spending or budget efficiency, it is an important symbolic move so that members of congress can "be credible" when discussing more substantive cuts.

=== Ambivalent arguments ===
Musicologist David Hebert published a nuanced argument that drew attention to “extremely admirable aspects to the role that bands play within the military context,” noting that US “Military bands provide much-needed relief to soldiers facing horrific stress” and “emphasize such values as altruism and even international cooperation. Moreover, some soldiers depart military bands and enter civilian life having attained outstanding musical and leadership skills.” However, he also acknowledged the deep and detrimental impact of militarism in US society generally, concluding that overall “militarism endangers music education” and military models are inappropriate for education of schoolchildren in a democracy, while pointing to evidence that “In the United States, we find an array of music education partnership projects with the military that would be unthinkable in many other countries”.

== History of debate ==
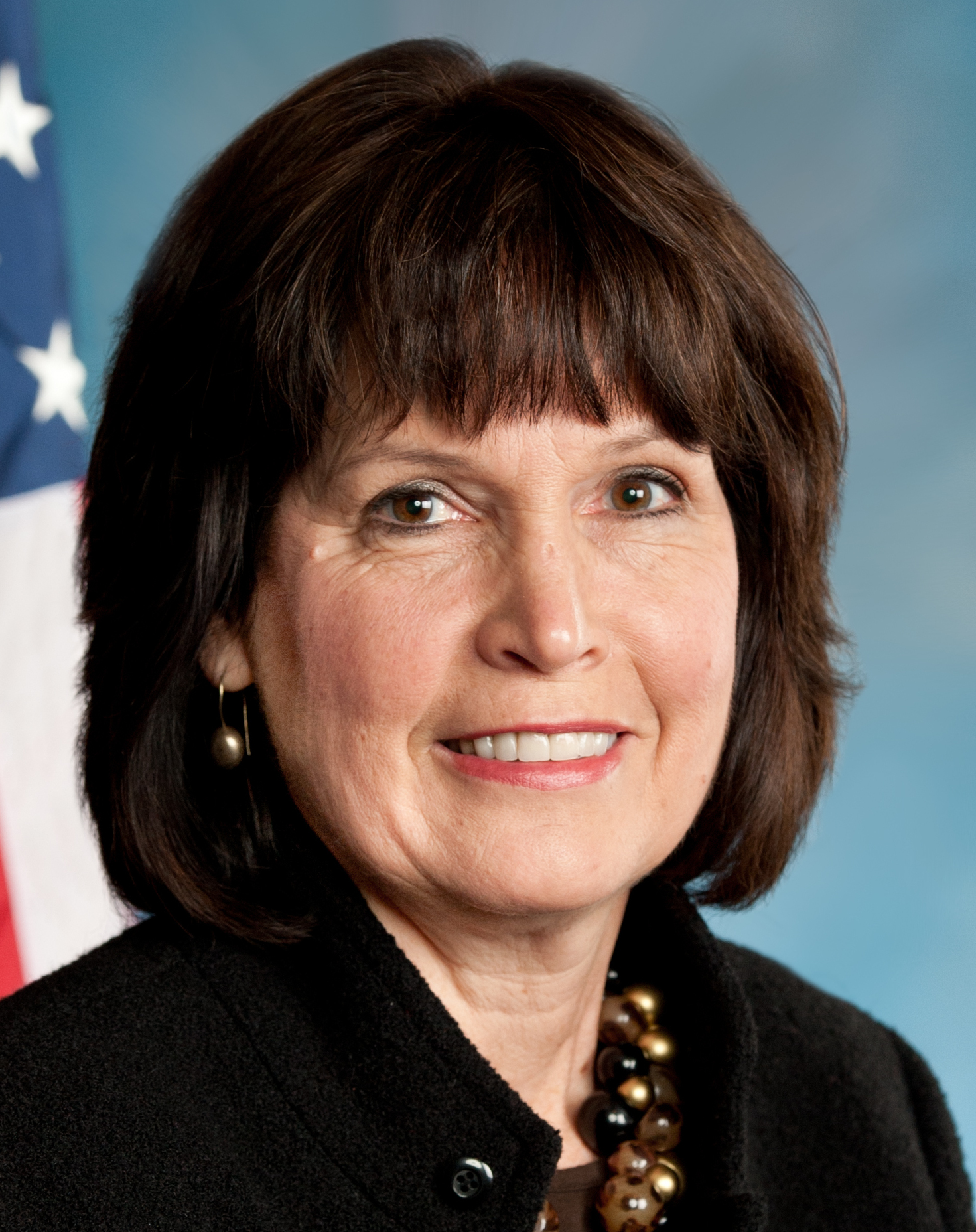
Rep. Betty McCollum has been a leading opponent of military band spending.

Calls for cuts to military music programs have periodically been used by politicians from the Democratic and Republican parties as a political "red meat" response to proposals for spending cuts in other areas.

In 1992 Senator Sam Nunn - fighting to stop closures of U.S. military bases in his home state as part of the peace dividend - instead suggested elimination of military bands that support the U.S. Military Academy, U.S. Naval Academy, and U.S. Air Force Academy. Nunn said that cadets and midshipmen should volunteer to form their own bands instead, which would save the U.S. up to $10 million. Representatives of service academies responded by explaining that, due to the unique nature of cadet life relative to student life at civilian universities, it would not be practical for volunteer ensembles to replace the academy bands. Also, because cadets and midshipmen are nominated by members of congress, rather than selected through more conventional application processes, there would have been no way for academies to vet the musical skills of incoming classes or guarantee there were enough musicians to be able to form the kind of properly instrumented ensembles necessary to support academy drill instruction. The proposal ultimately became stalled in a larger debate about trimming $1 billion from the Strategic Defense Initiative and did not move forward.

In 2011 Rep. Betty McCollum, responding to a proposal she opposed that would curb funding for the Corporation for Public Broadcasting, called for 40-percent of military band budgets to be slashed. McCollum's suggestion was decried by the Fleet Reserve Association and described by the National Association for Music Education as "potentially devastating." The McCollum bill was initially defeated, but reintroduced by the congresswoman a second time, when it narrowly passed with bipartisan support. It was ultimately dropped by the U.S. Senate. In 2012, McCollum again attempted to defund military music programs by reintroducing her amendment. In an effort to preempt further action by McCollum, the U.S. Air Force proactively disbanded one-third of its regional bands and sharply cut the number of billets of two others. Other service branches have prepared and staffed proposals to follow suit.

== See also ==
- Political debates about the United States federal budget
- United States military bands
