= Congressional Wildlife Refuge Caucus =

The Congressional Wildlife Refuge Caucus (CWRC) is a large bi-partisan Congressional Member Organization in the U.S. House of Representatives formed to support the National Wildlife Refuge System through legislation, funding, and education.

== History ==
CWRC Membership Map 2008

The Congressional Wildlife Refuge Caucus was established in September 2006 by Congressmen Ron Kind (D-WI) and Jim Saxton (R-NJ) along with vice co-chairs Michael Castle (R-DE) and Mike Thompson (D-CA) with a call to manage the National Wildlife Refuge System in the tradition of President Theodore Roosevelt, who established the first National Wildlife Refuge in 1903. The formation of the CWRC was largely a response to budget shortfalls that resulted in multi-billion dollar maintenance backlogs and staff shortages that, many agreed, was preventing the Refuge System from fulfilling its basic mission.

== Guiding Principles ==
=== Mission ===
The mission of the Congressional Wildlife Refuge Caucus is to fortify, protect and preserve the National Wildlife Refuge System by supporting adequate Refuge funding, working for the strategic growth of the Refuge System through easements and targeted land acquisition and by promoting legislation to improve the Refuge System. The CWRC also aims to educate members of Congress about the increasing number of challenges facing the System through briefings and other forms of outreach.

=== Purpose ===
The purpose of the CWRC is to:

- Raise awareness of our refuge system
- Create a voice for refuges in Congress
- Support adequate Refuge System budgets
- Support the six priority activities outlined in the National Wildlife Refuge System Improvement Act (hunting, fishing, wildlife photography, wildlife observation, environmental education and interpretation)
- Supporting the strategic growth of the Refuge System

== Caucus Activity ==
=== Legislation ===
The Congressional Wildlife Refuge Caucus co-chairs have introduced the Refuge Ecology Protection, Assistance & Immediate Response (REPAIR) Act, a bill aimed at reducing harmful non-native (invasive) species on land in and adjacent to National Wildlife Refuges. The REPAIR Act is intended to provide a cost-effective approach to maximize invasive species eradication efforts by establishing a grant program and codifying in law the highly successful Volunteer Invasives Monitoring Program (VIMP).

=== House Action ===
The Caucus also submits letters to federal appropriators and administration officials calling for specific dollar amounts in Refuge System appropriations that help drive the Refuge funding discussion in Congress. The co-chairs also author op-ed pieces magazines and newspapers to educate the public on the challenges facing the Refuge System. Caucus members also play an active role in committee hearings concerning the National Wildlife Refuge System, primarily in the House Natural Resources Committee, to collect testimony from managers and experts on legislation concerning the Refuge System.

== Members ==
=== Leadership ===
The CWRC is currently led by Rep. Rob Wittman (R-VA), Rep. Nancy Mace (R-SC), Rep. Jenniffer González-Colón (R-PR), Rep. Gabe Vasquez (D-NM), Rep. Melanie Stansbury (D-NM), Rep. Val Hoyle (D-OR) and Rep. Mike Thompson (D-CA). Past co-chairs include Rep. Ed Perlmutter (D-CO) and Rep. Michael Castle (R-DE).

The CWRC launched with 100 founding members and had grown to 139 members representing 41 States and 182 Wildlife Refuges as of November, 2009.

=== Current and former Congressional Wildlife Refuge Members ===
(in alphabetical order)

Member	State	Date Joined
Rep. Earl Blumenauer	OR	December 5, 2006
Rep. Matt Cartwright	PA	2013
Rep. Ed Case	HI	
Rep. Kathy Castor	FL	
Rep. Gerry Connolly	VA	July 26, 2010
Rep. Sharice Davids	KS	
Rep. Debbie Dingell	MI	2013
Rep. Lloyd Doggett	TX	April 26, 2006
Rep. Anna Eshoo	CA	July 28, 2006
Rep. Jenniffer González-Colón	PR	
Rep. Raul Grijalva	AZ	May 10, 2006
Rep. Brian Higgins	NY	August 22, 2006
Rep. Val Hoyle	OR	
Rep. Sheila Jackson Lee	TX	July 31, 2006
Rep. Dave Joyce	OH	
Rep. Jen Kiggans	VA	
Rep. Rick Larsen	WA	October 18, 2006
Rep. John Larson	CT	July 31, 2006
Rep. Barbara Lee	CA	January 31, 2007
Rep. Zoe Lofgren	CA	September 18, 2006
Rep. Stephen Lynch	MA	August 3, 2006
Rep. Nancy Mace	SC	
Rep. Jim Marshall	GA	July 25, 2006
Rep. Doris Matsui	CA	August 29, 2006
Rep. Betty McCollum	MN	August 31, 2006
Rep. Grace Napolitano	CA	September 22, 2006
Rep. Frank Pallone	NJ	May 31, 2006
Rep. Bill Pascrell	NJ	September 15, 2006
Rep. Donald Payne	NJ	June 7, 2006
Rep. Chellie Pingree	ME	2013
Rep. Gregorio Sablan	CNMI	October 19, 2009
Rep. Linda Sánchez	CA	2013
Rep. Jan Schakowsky	IL	May 30, 2007
Rep. Adam Smith	WA	July 20, 2006
Rep. Melanie Stansbury	NM	
Rep. Mike Thompson	CA	March 14, 2006
Rep. Gabe Vasquez	NM	
Rep. Bruce Westerman	AR	
Rep. Joe Wilson	SC	August 29, 2006
Rep. Rob Wittman	VA	May 1, 2008
