= U.S. Army All-American Marching Band =

The U.S. Army All-American Marching Band was a U.S. Army-sponsored civilian marching band competitively recruited from high school senior musicians early each December and dissolved the following month. First organized in 2007 and discontinued in 2019, it was neither an active, nor reserve component band and its performances were limited to events during and preceding the U.S. Army All-American Bowl in San Antonio, Texas, including the halftime show of that event. Uniforms were patterned on contemporary civilian marching band uniform designs and styled in black and gold, accented by the Army's two-part identity patch with the words "U.S. Army" across the front. The U.S. Army All-American Band was used by the Army as a recruiting tool to interest talented, graduating high school musicians in enlisting in the U.S. Army and pursuing a career in the Army's music program.

The band was led by music educators from across the country, selected each year by the National Association for Music Education. Members also received guidance with musicians of the U.S. Army Field Band, led by COL Jim Keene. Approximately 2,000 students auditioned for the 125 spots available in the 2016 edition of the band. Those selected received an all-expense-paid trip to San Antonio for rehearsals and performance. According to the National Association for Music Education, costs associated with the band were underwritten by several corporate sponsors, such as Jupiter Band Instruments, DeMoulin Bros. and Company, in addition to the United States Army Recruiting Command.

Unlike other bands maintained by the U.S. Army, the U.S. Army All-American Band was a show band and did not engage in traditional military band functions, such as support for public duties or drill and ceremony.

In 2019, the U.S. Army All-American Marching Band was discontinued.

== See also ==
- United States military bands
