= Las Cruces Bulletin =

Weekly newspaper in Las Cruces, New Mexico

- Front page of Las Cruces Bulletin on August 15, 2008
- Type: Weekly newspaper
- Format: Tabloid
- Owner: Osteen Media Group
- Founder(s): Doris M. Boyd; Norman E. Donnelly
- Managing editor: Susan Morée
- Founded: 1969
- Language: English
- Headquarters: Las Cruces, New Mexico
- Circulation: 10,000
- OCLC number: 53462847
- Website: lascrucesbulletin.com

Las Cruces Bulletin is a weekly community newspaper published in Las Cruces, New Mexico. The paper is distributed free to homes and businesses in Las Cruces and is available by paid subscription elsewhere.

== History ==
On December 4, 1969, Doris M. Boyd and her son Norman E. Donnelly published the first edition of the weekly Las Cruces Bulletin in Las Cruces, New Mexico. The Donnelly family previously published the Central Oregonian for 15 years. Kenneth Dahlstrom Sr. soon became publisher. In May 1971, Fred Hervey, owner of Sun Publishing in El Paso, Texas, became a major stock owner.

In May 1983, Stephen C. "Steve" Klinger bought the Bulletin from Dahlstrom Sr. In June 1986, two fires caused $40,000 worth of damage to the paper's office. The first fire was attributed to an electrical short in an extension cord, but the second was ruled arson. Someone poured gasoline down an air conditioning duct and then set the building on fire. Later, a man threatened Klinger over the phone, saying he would kill him and his family if he continued to publish the Bulletin. Klinger was undeterred and continued publishing anyway.

In February 1997, Klinger sold the Bulletin to Mark Kilpatrick. In 2003, Jaki and David McCollum acquired the paper. In November 2012, Osteen Publishing Co., bought the paper. In October 2021, the company split, but Graham Osteen retained ownership of the Bulletin.

== Awards ==
In 2006, the Bulletin was named New Mexico's "Newspaper of the Year" by the New Mexico Farm and Livestock Bureau. The paper's publisher, David McCollum, was named Citizen of the Year and the paper was named Business of the Year for 2005 by the Greater Las Cruces Chamber of Commerce.
