= Betty McCollum =

American politician (born 1954)

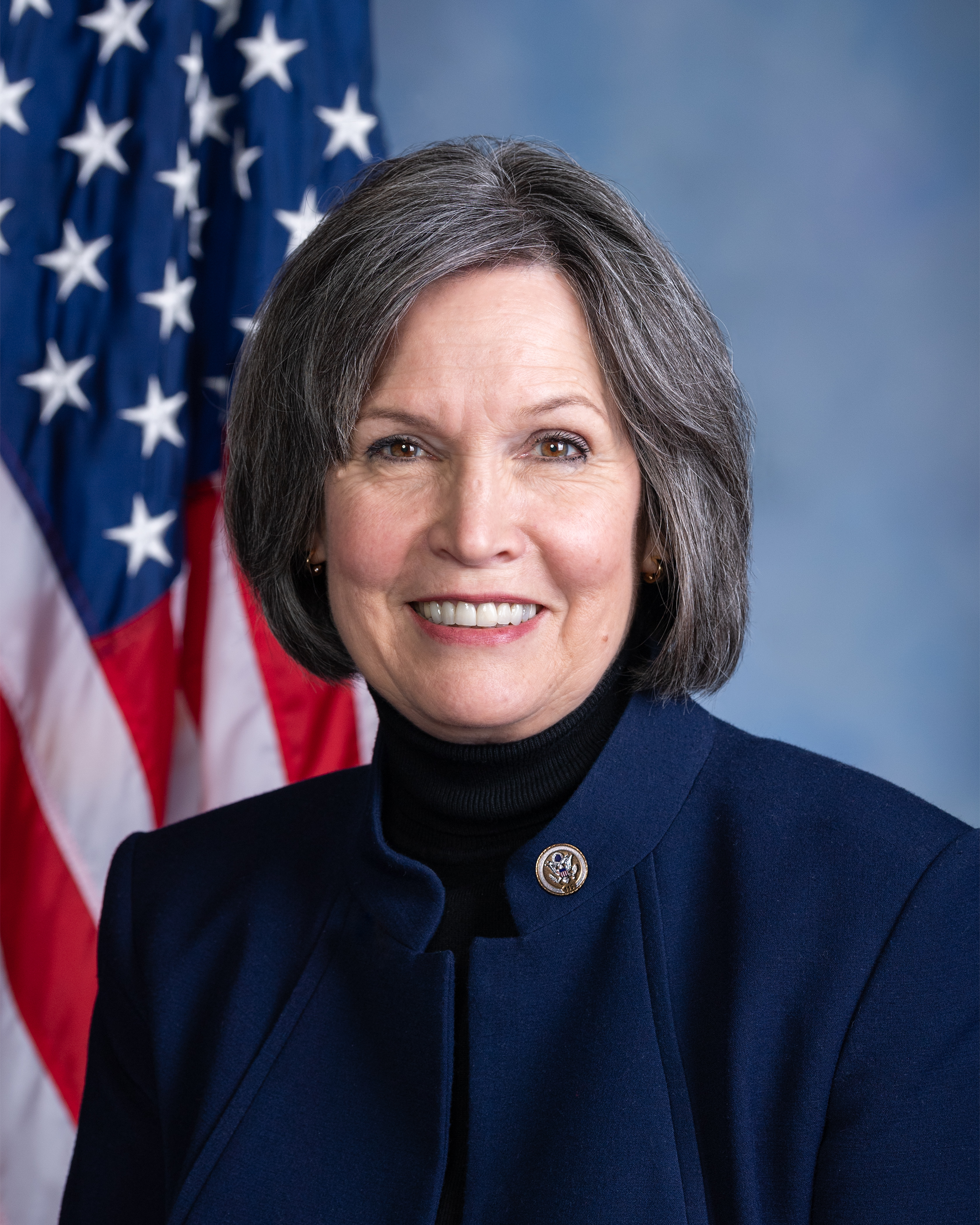
- Official portrait, 2019

Member of the U.S. House of Representatives from Minnesota's 4th district
- Incumbent
- Assumed office January 3, 2001
- Preceded by: Bruce Vento

Member of the Minnesota House of Representatives from the 55B district
- In office January 5, 1993 – January 3, 2001
- Preceded by: Harriet McPherson
- Succeeded by: Scott Wasiluk

Personal details
- Born: Betty Louise Dierich; July 12, 1954 (age 72) Minneapolis, Minnesota, U.S.
- Party: Democratic (DFL)
- Spouse: Douglas (divorced)
- Children: 2
- Education: Inver Hills Community College (AA); St. Catherine University (BA)
- Website: House website Campaign website
- McCollum's voice McCollum honoring the death of U.S. Rep. Jim Hagedorn. Recorded February 28, 2022

Betty Louise McCollum (/məˈkɒləm/ mə-KOL-əm; born July 12, 1954) is an American politician serving as the U.S. representative for Minnesota's 4th congressional district since 2001. She previously served in the Minnesota House of Representatives from 1993 to 2001. She is a member of the Democratic-Farmer-Labor Party (DFL). McCollum's district centers on St. Paul, Minnesota's capital city. She is the second woman elected to Congress from Minnesota. McCollum has been the dean of Minnesota's congressional delegation since 2021, when Representative Collin Peterson lost reelection.

== Biography ==
McCollum was born in Minneapolis. She attended Inver Hills Community College, where she earned an Associate of Arts in 1980. In 1987, she graduated from the College of St. Catherine with a bachelor's degree in social studies and education, minoring in political science.

Before entering politics, McCollum worked as a high school social studies teacher and as a retail store manager for Dayton's and Sears.

McCollum first ran for the North St. Paul city council in 1984, but was not elected until 1986. In 1992 she was elected to the Minnesota House of Representatives after she defeated an incumbent state representative in the DFL primary. She served four terms in the Minnesota House before being elected to Congress in 2000.

== U.S. House of Representatives ==
=== Campaigns ===
After 4th district Representative Bruce Vento decided not to seek a 13th term due to illness in 2000 (he died before the election), McCollum won the DFL nomination to succeed him. The district is heavily Democratic; among Minnesota's congressional districts, only the neighboring Minneapolis-based 5th district is considered more Democratic. The DFL has held the seat without interruption since 1949.

McCollum's main concern during the campaign wasn't her Republican opponent, State Senator Linda Runbeck, but Independence Party candidate Tom Foley. Foley had previously been county attorney for Ramsey County (almost all of which is in the 4th district) as a Democrat. Many thought Foley might siphon off enough votes from McCollum to allow Runbeck to win. But McCollum defeated Runbeck by 17 points, with Foley in a distant third place. Foley held McCollum to 48% of the vote, making her the only Democrat not to win at least 50% of the vote since Democrats began their dominance in the district. The district has since reverted to form, and McCollum has been reelected nine times with no substantive opposition.

=== Tenure ===
According to the McCourt School of Public Policy at Georgetown University, McCollum held a Bipartisan Index Score of -0.1 in the 116th United States Congress for 2019, which placed her 219th out of 435 members. Based on FiveThirtyEight's congressional vote tracker at ABC News, McCollum voted with Donald Trump's stated public policy positions 11.4% of the time, which ranked her average in the 116th United States Congress when predictive scoring (district partisanship and voting record) is used. In the 117th Congress, she voted with President Joe Biden's stated position 100% of the time.

=== Committee assignments ===
For the 119th Congress:

- Committee on Appropriations
  - Subcommittee on Defense (Ranking Member)
  - Subcommittee on Interior, Environment, and Related Agencies

As head Democratic appropriator for defense, McCollum has been influential in directing earmarks and defense spending contracts towards Minnesota, where Pentagon spending has historically been low, along with a former aide-turned-lobbyist. Accordingly, she has become a top recipient of campaign financing from defense industry PACs and individuals.

==== Party leadership, caucus, and other memberships ====
- Senior Whip
- Co-founder of the Congressional Global Health Caucus
- Co-founder of the Quality Care Coalition
- Vice Chair of Congressional Native American Caucus (Co-Chair Emeritus)
- National Council on the Arts
- Congressional Asian Pacific American Caucus (Associate Member)
- Congressional Caucus on Global Road Safety
- International Conservation Caucus
- Congressional Arts Caucus
- Afterschool Caucuses
- Co-Chair United States Congressional International Conservation Caucus
- Veterinary Medicine Caucus
- Congressional Coalition on Adoption
- Congressional Caucus for the Equal Rights Amendment
- Congressional Wildlife Refuge Caucus
- Black Maternal Health Caucus
- House Celiac Disease Caucus
- Congressional Caucus on Turkey and Turkish Americans

McCollum is the first woman elected to Congress from Minnesota since Coya Knutson in the 1950s.

McCollum received a 91% progressive rating from Progressive Punch, a self-described nonpartisan group that provides a "searchable database of Congressional voting records from a Progressive perspective", and a 13% conservative rating from the conservative SBE Council.

== Political positions ==
McCollum is pro-choice and supports Planned Parenthood, NARAL Pro-Choice America, and National Family Planning & Reproductive Health Association. The latter organization aims to provide access to family planning and reproductive health care services and advocates for reproductive freedom. She indicated on the 2002 National Political Awareness Test that she believed abortions should always be legally available, but only within the first trimester of pregnancy.

McCollum has consistently supported the rights of members in the LGBTQ community. The Human Rights Campaign, one of America's largest civil rights organization working to achieve lesbian, gay, bisexual and transgender equality, has continually approved of her voting record. In a speech opposing the proposed Federal Marriage Amendment, McCollum said, "Gay and lesbian Americans are citizens who must never be treated as second-class citizens".

She has supported the interests of the elderly with regard to preserving Social Security. She has backed organizations such as the Alliance for Retired Americans and the National Committee to Preserve Social Security and Medicare, which share the mission to ensure social and economic justice and full civil rights for all citizens so that they may enjoy lives of dignity, personal and family fulfillment and security. In a position paper, McCollum defended her position on Social Security, writing, "We can secure the future of Social Security with common sense and a shared, bipartisan commitment to economic security and fiscal responsibility for all Americans. This is my commitment, and you can count on me to work to protect Social Security and to find a solution that truly protects the retirement security of every American."

McCollum advocates shifting America's energy consumption to cleaner, non-carbon-based sources. Along with Al Franken and Kit Bond, she introduced the Renewable Energy and Efficiency Act, a bill to utilize thermal energy sources and create renewable energy production tax credits. She also voted for the American Recovery and Reinvestment in 2009. In 2004, McCollum gained national visibility when she and fellow Democrat Jim McDermott of Washington called for Secretary of Education Rod Paige to resign for claiming the National Education Association was "a terrorist organization." She also introduced amendments in June 2011 and 2012 to cut funding for military bands by $125 million, a proposal opposed by the Fleet Reserve Association and which the National Association for Music Education called "potentially devastating." McCollum opposes Conceal-and-Carry legislation and voted against Right-to-Carry reciprocity in November 2011.

In July 2019, McCollum voted against a House resolution introduced by Representative Brad Schneider of Illinois opposing the Global Boycott, Divestment, and Sanctions Movement targeting Israel. The resolution passed 398-17. In February 2020, McCollum called AIPAC a hate group and accused it of hate speech. In April 2021, McCollum introduced the Defending the Human Rights of Palestinian Children and Families Living under Israeli Military Occupation Act, a bill that aims to prohibit Israel from using U.S. aid to detain Palestinian minors, demolish Palestinian homes, or further annex West Bank land. The bill requires the State Department to file an annual report to Congress detailing the extent to which U.S. aid from the previous fiscal year was used to bankroll any of the aforementioned activities. On July 18, 2023, McCollum voted "present" on a congressional non-binding resolution proposed by August Pfluger that "the State of Israel is not a racist or apartheid state", that Congress rejects "all forms of antisemitism and xenophobia", and that “the United States will always be a staunch partner and supporter of Israel". On May 14, 2026, McCollum co-sponsored a bill introduced by Representative Rashida Tlaib aimed at recognizing the Nakba and Palestinian refugees' rights.

On July 19, 2024, McCollum called for Joe Biden to withdraw from the 2024 United States presidential election.

== Awards ==
In 2017, McCollum received the Joan and Walter Mondale Award for Public Service at the Humphrey–Mondale Awards.

== Personal life ==
McCollum is Roman Catholic and has been diagnosed with celiac disease.

== Electoral history ==
2000 Fourth Congressional District of Minnesota Elections
Party	Candidate	Votes	%	±%
Democratic	Betty McCollum	130,403	48.04%	–
Republican	Linda Runbeck	83,852	30.89%	–
Independence	Tom Foley	55,899	20.59%	–
Constitution	Nicholas Skrivanek	1,285	0.47%	–

2002 Fourth Congressional District of Minnesota Elections
Party	Candidate	Votes	%	±%
Democratic	Betty McCollum	164,597	62.22%	+14.18%
Republican	Clyde Billington	89,705	33.91%	–
Green	Scott J. Raskiewicz	9,919	3.75%	–

2004 Fourth Congressional District of Minnesota Elections
Party	Candidate	Votes	%	±%
Democratic	Betty McCollum	182,387	57.48%	−4.74%
Republican	Patrice Bataglia	105,467	33.24%	–
Independence	Peter F. Vento	29,099	9.17%	–

2006 Fourth Congressional District of Minnesota Elections
Party	Candidate	Votes	%	±%
Democratic	Betty McCollum	172,096	69.54%	+12.06%
Republican	Obi Sium	74,797	30.23%	–

2008 Fourth Congressional District of Minnesota Elections
Party	Candidate	Votes	%	±%
Democratic	Betty McCollum	216,267	68.44%	−1.10%
Republican	Ed Matthews	98,936	31.31%	–

2010 Fourth Congressional District of Minnesota Elections
Party	Candidate	Votes	%	±%
Democratic	Betty McCollum	136,746	59.09%	−9.30%
Republican	Teresa Collett	80,141	34.63%	–
Independence	Steve Carlson	14,207	6.14%	–

2012 Fourth Congressional District of Minnesota Elections
Party	Candidate	Votes	%	±%
Democratic	Betty McCollum	216,685	62.27%	+3.18%
Republican	Tony Hernandez	109,659	31.51%	–
Independence	Steve Carlson	21,135	6.07%	−0.07%

2014 Fourth Congressional District of Minnesota Elections
Party	Candidate	Votes	%	±%
Democratic	Betty McCollum	147,857	61.19%	−1.08%
Republican	Sharna Wahlgren	79,492	32.90%	–
Independence	Dave Thomas	14,059	5.82%	–

2016 Fourth Congressional District of Minnesota Elections
Party	Candidate	Votes	%	±%
Democratic	Betty McCollum	203,299	57.76%	−4.03%
Republican	Greg Ryan	121,032	34.39%	–
Legal Marijuana Now	Susan Pendergast Sindt	27,152	7.71%	–

2018 Fourth Congressional District of Minnesota Elections
Party	Candidate	Votes	%	±%
Democratic	Betty McCollum	216,866	65.99%	+8.23%
Republican	Greg Ryan	97,746	29.75%	−4.64%
Legal Marijuana Now	Susan Pendergast Sindt	13,777	4.19%	−3.52%

2020 Fourth Congressional District of Minnesota Elections
Party	Candidate	Votes	%	±%
Democratic (DFL)	Betty McCollum	245,813	63.2%	−2.8%
Republican	Gene Rechtzigel	112,730	29.0%	−
Grassroots	Susan Sindt	29,537	7.6%	−
Write-in		1,034	0.3%	-

2022 Fourth Congressional District of Minnesota Elections
Party	Candidate	Votes	%	±%
Democratic (DFL)	Betty McCollum	200,055	67.59%	+4.4%
Republican	May Lor Xiong	95,493	32.26%	−
Write-in		425	0.14%	-

2024 Minnesota's 4th congressional district election
Party	Candidate	Votes	%
Democratic (DFL)	Betty McCollum (incumbent)	242,802	67.2
Republican	May Lor Xiong	117,618	32.6
Write-in		623	0.2
Total votes		361,043	100.0
Democratic (DFL) hold			

== See also ==
- Minnesota's congressional delegations
- List of United States representatives from Minnesota
- Women in the United States House of Representatives

U.S. House of Representatives
Preceded by Bruce Vento	Member of the U.S. House of Representatives from Minnesota's 4th congressional district 2001–present	Incumbent
U.S. order of precedence (ceremonial)
Preceded by Rick Larsen	United States representatives by seniority 34th	Succeeded by Stephen Lynch
Preceded by Sam Graves	Order of precedence of the United States	Succeeded by Rick Larsen
