= The Round Up (newspaper) =

Independent student-run newspaper of New Mexico State University

NMSU RoundUp
- Round Up Logo
- Type: News Website / Periodic Newspaper
- Format: Online and Broadsheet/Magazine
- Publisher: NMSU Student Media
- Founded: 1907
- Language: English
- Circulation: 2,000
- Website: nmsuroundup.com
- Headquarters: Student Media Offices; Corbett Center; NMSU Main Campus; Las Cruces, New Mexico, 88003

The Round Up is the independent, student-run newspaper of New Mexico State University (NMSU). It publishes daily breaking news and information on its website, and prints a weekly edition on the campus. The Round Up was established in 1907, and was first published in Albuquerque, New Mexico, US.

== History ==
The Round Up was established in 1907 as a result of a merger of The New Mexico Collegian, which was founded in January 1891, and the College Weekly, which was founded in November 1906. It was first published in 1907–1908 school year, with 37 weekly issues completing its first volume, through the leadership of Justin R. Weddell, the Managing Editor; George G. Helde, the Associate Editor, and 11 reporters. The Round Up was first printed in Albuquerque resulting to its first publication to the public, since the city has the best printing machine at that time.

The name of the student newspapers was selected as a result of its one editorial stating, "It is a precise name for the paper, which is actually a weekly round-up of news and involves a rounding up of subscribers and advertisers as well. The NMSU Board of Regents recognized the Round Up as an important function of the university, making it the official student publication of the university.

In 1999, The Round Up launched its website, which continues to operate.

The Round Up underwent many different faces and phases including breaking away from the student government, ASNMSU, and becoming truly independent in 2013.

In 2015, the paper changed its brand identity and format for a year, and reduced its frequency to once monthly. In 2016 it reverted to the previous format and weekly publication, becoming based solely at NMSU.
