= Central Christian Church =

Central Christian Church may refer to:

in Singapore

- Central Christian Church, Singapore, in Punggol

in the United States (by state then city)

- Central Christian Church (Indianapolis, Indiana), in Marion County, Indiana
- Central Christian Church (Lexington, Kentucky), listed on the NRHP in Fayette County, Kentucky
- Central Christian Church (Henderson, Nevada), in the Las Vegas Valley
- Central Christian Church (Enterprise, Nevada), in the Las Vegas Valley
- Central Christian Church (Austin, Texas), listed on the NRHP in Travis County, Texas
- Central Christian Church (Dallas, Texas)
- Central Christian Church (Greenville, Texas), listed on the NRHP in Travis County, Texas
