= 100th Army Band =

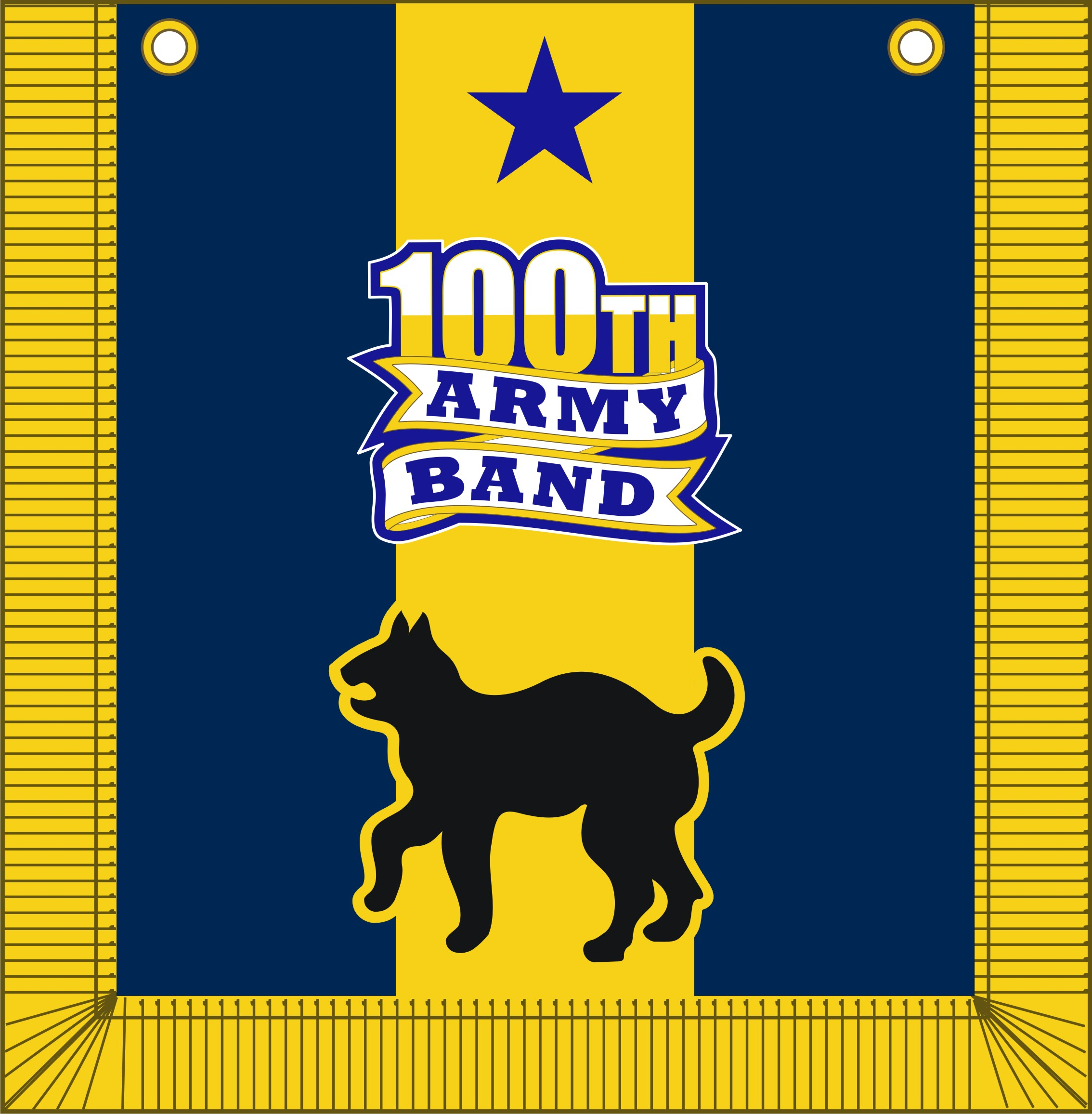
- Tabard
- Active: 1943-46; 1956 - present
- Country: United States
- Branch: United States Army Reserve
- Type: Army Band
- Part of: 81st Readiness Division
- Garrison/HQ: Fort Knox
- Nickname: Band of the Century
- Motto: Wildcats Never Quit
- March: The Wildcat March
- Engagements: Rhineland; Ardennes-Alsace; Central Europe

Commanders
- Current commander: CW4 Chad Alward
- First Sergeant: 1SG Jordan Lynch
- Notable commanders: CW5 Lawrence Barton, Chief FORSCOM USAR Staff Bands Officer 2009 - 2017

The 100th Army Band, popularly known as the Band of the Century, is a United States Army Reserve unit stationed at Fort Knox, Kentucky, and a unit of the 81st Readiness Division. It was reassigned from the 100th Infantry Division on 1 October 2008 as part of the Army Reserve Transformation process. The 100th Army Band currently features eight musical performance teams (MPTs) that perform a wide range of repertoire. Since 2012, performance requests have taken the band's various ensembles across Kentucky and across the nation into other states including Tennessee, Ohio, Indiana, Illinois, Maryland, Florida, South Carolina, Kansas, Alabama, Georgia, Texas, Virginia, and Hawaii.

The 100th Army Band typically trains for one weekend each month and embarks on a two / three week annual training every summer.

== Leadership ==
Current officers and senior NCOs of the 100th Army Band include:

Commanding Officer	Chief Warrant Officer 4 Chad Alward
Executive Officer	Chief Warrant Officer 2 Brooke Woods
First Sergeant	1SG Jordan Lynch
Human Resources NCOIC	SFC Bryan Brown
Training NCOIC	SFC Jonathan Staples
Operations NCOIC	SFC Meredith Melvin
Logistics NCOIC	SFC Shane Mitchell
Public Affairs NCOIC	SGT Kevin Kortz
Army Reserve Administrator	Mrs. Kelly Mitchell and Mr. Eric Stroupe II
AGR	SFC Christopher Currens

== Musical performance teams ==
The 100th Army Band currently employs eight MPTs, including:

Ensemble	OIC/NCOIC
Concert Band	CW4 Chad Alward
Ceremonial Band	SSG Jeffery Parks
"Hard Knox" Rock Band	SSG Lee Clements
Brass Quintet	SFC Jonathan Staples
Marching Band	MSG Billy Eff, Drum Major
Jazz Band	SPC Brandon McKinley
Jazz Combo	SGT Chris Abell
Woodwind Quintet	SSG Rachel Carman

== Performances ==
Army bands are most commonly requested for performances falling into three categories: public outreach, soldier & family support, and educational outreach. Public outreach performances include events such as community concerts and parades. Soldier & family support performances include military events such as change of command ceremonies, promotion ceremonies, retirement ceremonies, & dining out ceremonies. Educational outreach performances normally include musical or recruiting visits to schools, colleges, & job fairs.

Trumpet players from military bands are also regularly tasked with sounding the Taps bugle call at funerals and memorial services for service members of the United States Armed Forces, and for memorial ceremonies across the country.

=== Annual training ===
As an Army Reserve Band, the 100th typically spends two weeks each summer backfilling an active duty (Regular Army) band, while those soldiers enjoy a two-week block leave. Since 2009, The 100th Army Band has supported bands and missions at the following locations:

- 2009 - Fort Benning, GA (Maneuver Center of Excellence Band / backfill)
- 2010 - Fort Riley, KS (1st Infantry Division Band / backfill)
- 2011 - Fort Jackson, SC (282nd Army Band / backfill)
- 2012 - Schofield Barracks, HI (25th Infantry Division Band / backfill)
- 2013 - Fort Knox, KY (113th Army Band / backfill)
- 2014 - Fort Eustis, VA (TRADOC Band / backfill)
- 2015 - Fort McCoy, WI (WAREX)
- 2016 - Fort Knox, KY (Cadet Command support)
- 2017 - Fort Bliss, TX (1st Armored Division Band / backfill)
- 2018 - Fort Knox, KY (Cadet Command support)
- 2019 - Fort Bliss, TX (1st Armored Division Band / backfill)
- 2021 - Fort Bliss, TX (1st Armored Division Band / backfill)
- 2023 - Schofield Barracks, HI (25th Infantry Division Band / backfill)
- 2024 - Normandy, France (D-Day 80th Anniversary)
- 2025 - Multi State Tour (Kentucky, Tennessee, and North Carolina)
- 2026 - Fort Eustis, VA (COMREL and Military Support of the Nation's 250th Birthday)

=== Notable performances ===
- The 100th Army Band performed in the Normandy area of France at over 20 missions in support of the U.S. Army's 80th Anniversary of D-Day.
- The 100th's Marching Band regularly performs for the "First Fourth of July Parade" in Gatlinburg, Tennessee. The parade is so named due to its annual start time: 12:01 am on the morning of July 4.
- The 100th Army Band has performed the National Anthem and Kentucky State Song, "My Old Kentucky Home," for the opening session of the Kentucky State Senate for several years.
- 2015 annual training, Fort McCoy WI. The 100th Army Band executed 21 performance missions in a nine-day period.
- Bands of America Grand National Championships, November 2014
- 2012 annual training, Schofield Barracks, HI. The 100th Army Band executed 20 performance missions in a 13-day period.
- Cincinnati Reds baseball game, June 2012

== Lineage and honors ==
=== Lineage ===
- Constituted 2 August 1943 in the Army of the United States as the Band, 100th Infantry Division
- Activated 14 August 1943 at Fort Jackson, South Carolina
- Reorganized and redesignated 1 December 1943 as the 100th Infantry Division Band
- Inactivated 15 January 1946 at Camp Patrick Hentry, Virginia
- (Organized Reserves redesignated 25 March 1948 as the Organized Reserve Corps; redesignated 9 July 1952 as the Army Reserve)
- Redesignated 12 May 1952 as the 100th Infantry Division Band
- Activated 1 August 1956 at Fort Thomas, Kentucky
- Reorganized and redesigned 17 April 1959 as the 100th Division Band
- Ordered into active military service 25 September 1961 at Fort Thomas, Kentucky; released from active military service 15 August 1962 and reverted to reserve status
- Consolidated 26 January 1968 with the Support Company, 100th Division (Training) and consolidated unit reorganized and redesignated as the Support Company and Band, 100th Division (Training)
- Reorganized and redesignated 1 October 1970 as Headquarters, Headquarters Company and Band, 100th Support Battalion, an element of the 100th Division (Training)
- Reorganized and redesignated 5 July 1971 as Headquarters, Headquarters Detachment and Band, 100th Support Battalion
- (Location of Band element changed in 1979 to Hebron, Kentucky)
- Band element withdrawn 16 November 1982 from Headquarters, Headquarters Detachment and Band, 100th Support Battalion and redesigned as the 100th Army Band, an element of the 100th Division (Training), and location concurrently changed to Louisville, Kentucky (Headquarters and Headquarters Detachment, 100th Support Battalion—hereafter separate lineage)
- Reorganized and redesignated 17 September 1983 as the Band element of Headquarters Company, 100th Division (Training)
- Band element withdrawn 16 September 1988 from Headquarters Company, 100th Division (Training); concurrently reorganized and redesigned as the 100th Division Band.
- Location changed in 1990 to Fort Knox, Kentucky
- Relieved 1 October 2008 from assignment to the 100th Division (Training)
- Reorganized and redesignated 16 October 2008 as the 100th Army Band

=== Awards ===
Decorations

Ribbon	Award	Date	Streamer embroidered	Order No.
ribbon	Meritorious Unit Commendation (Army)		EUROPEAN THEATER	

- Army Safety Excellence Streamer

Campaign participation credit

- World War II: Rhineland; Ardennes-Alsace; Central Europe

=== Individual awards ===
==== Sergeant Audie Murphy Club ====
The Sergeant Audie Murphy Club is an organization exclusive to the U.S. Army, with membership available only to U.S. Army non-commissioned officers. According to FORSCOM regulations, all members of the Sergeant Audie Murphy Club must "...exemplify leadership characterized by personal concern for the needs, training, development, and welfare of Soldiers and concern for families of Soldiers."

- In November 2011, 100th Army Band member Staff Sergeant Tyler Myers was inducted into the Sergeant Audie Murphy Club.

==== Colonel Hamilton Award ====
The Colonel Finley R. Hamilton Outstanding Musician Award was first awarded in 2010 to musicians from all five branches of United States military service. A service member who is eligible for consideration for this award will be an "outstanding musician demonstrating excellence in both solo and ensemble performance" who must also "display exceptional leadership qualities," and "great potential for future outstanding service." Consideration for this award is limited to members of military bands who hold the pay grades of E4 to E6 only. To date, five members of the 100th Army Band have received the COL Hamilton Award:

- Sergeant Rachel Carman, 2020
- Sergeant Brooke Woods, 2016
- Sergeant Benjamin Garnett, 2012
- Staff Sergeant Billy Eff, 2011
- Staff Sergeant Chad Alward, 2010

== Heraldric devices ==
The 100th Army Band has its own collection of heraldric devices, including a baldric, mace, tabard, drum design and unit tab for wear on the uniform.

The regalia designs are based upon elements of the 81st Readiness Division's shoulder sleeve insignia and distinctive unit insignia. A scroll on both baldric and drumshell reads "TRAIN MAINTAIN SUSTAIN" and is the command's motto. A second scroll on the drumshell reads "WILDCATS NEVER QUIT!" and is the command's slogan. The scrolls are pinned down by the Philippine sun and fleur-de-lis which commemorate the unit's campaign awards. The mace is decorated with goldenrods, the state flower of Kentucky, which reach full bloom late summer in and around Fort Knox, where the 100th Army Band trains. The base reads "WARRIOR MUSICIAN," while "100TH ARMY BAND" goes completely around the head.

100th Army Band Drum Major's baldric	100th Army Band Drum Major's mace 100th Army Band herald trumpet's tabard	100th Army Band snare drum design 100th Army Band unit tab

== Trivia ==
- There are three U.S. Army Bands currently stationed in Kentucky: The 100th Army Band (Reserve, Fort Knox), the 202nd Army Band (National Guard, Frankfort), and the 101st Airborne Division Band (Regular Army, Fort Campbell).
- Out of 17 total Army Reserve bands, the 100th Army Band, the 78th Army Band, and the 313th Army Band are the only USAR bands stationed on active duty Army posts. The 100th is stationed at Fort Knox KY, the 78th is stationed at Fort Dix, NJ, and the 313th is stationed at Redstone Arsenal, AL.
- The 113th Army Band (active duty) was also stationed at Fort Knox until its inactivation on 1 OCT 2016.

== See also ==
- United States Army School of Music
- United States military music customs
- United States military bands
- Military band
