= Audie Murphy honors and awards =

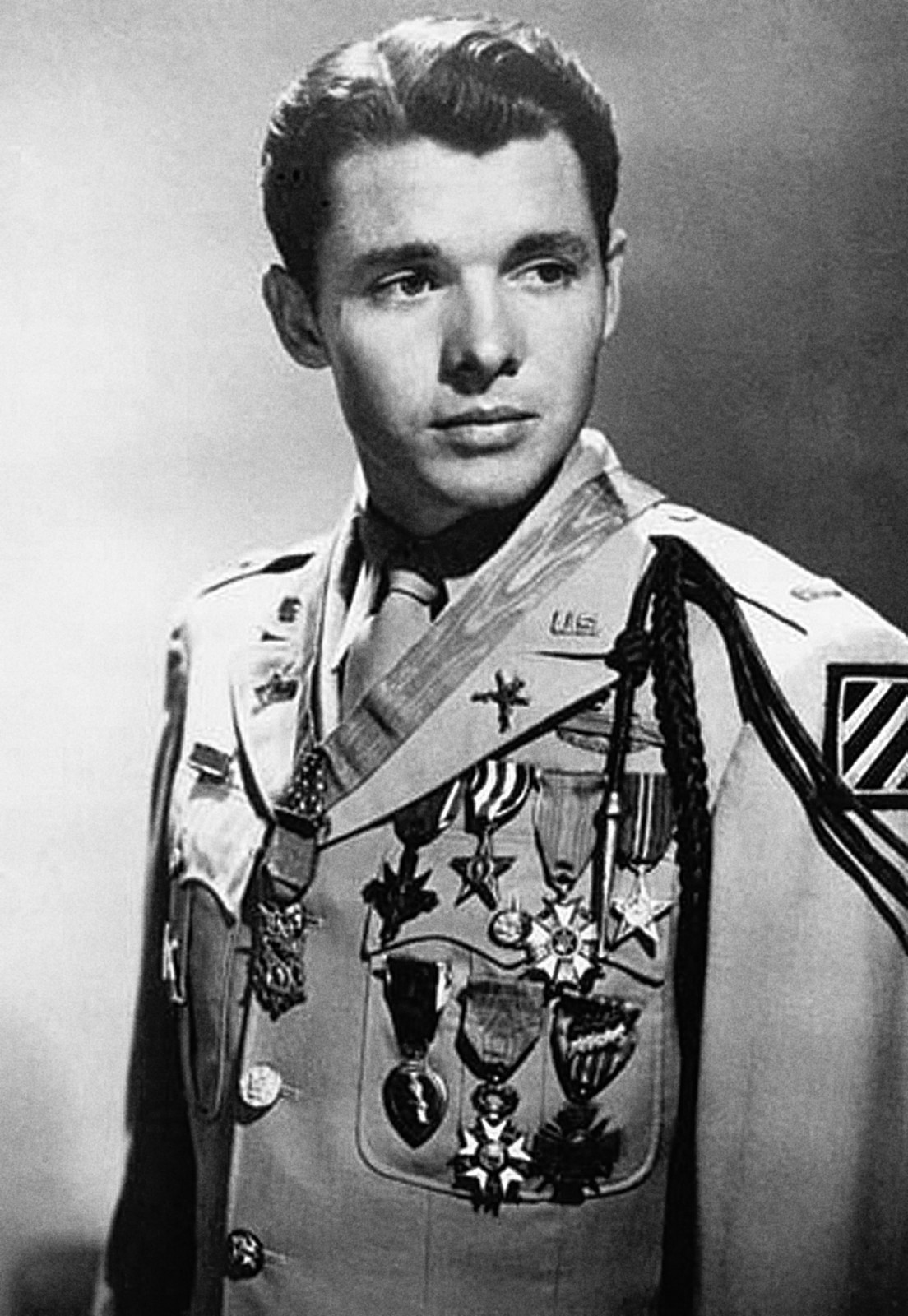
Murphy wearing the U.S. Army khaki "Class A" (tropical service) uniform with full-size medals, 1948

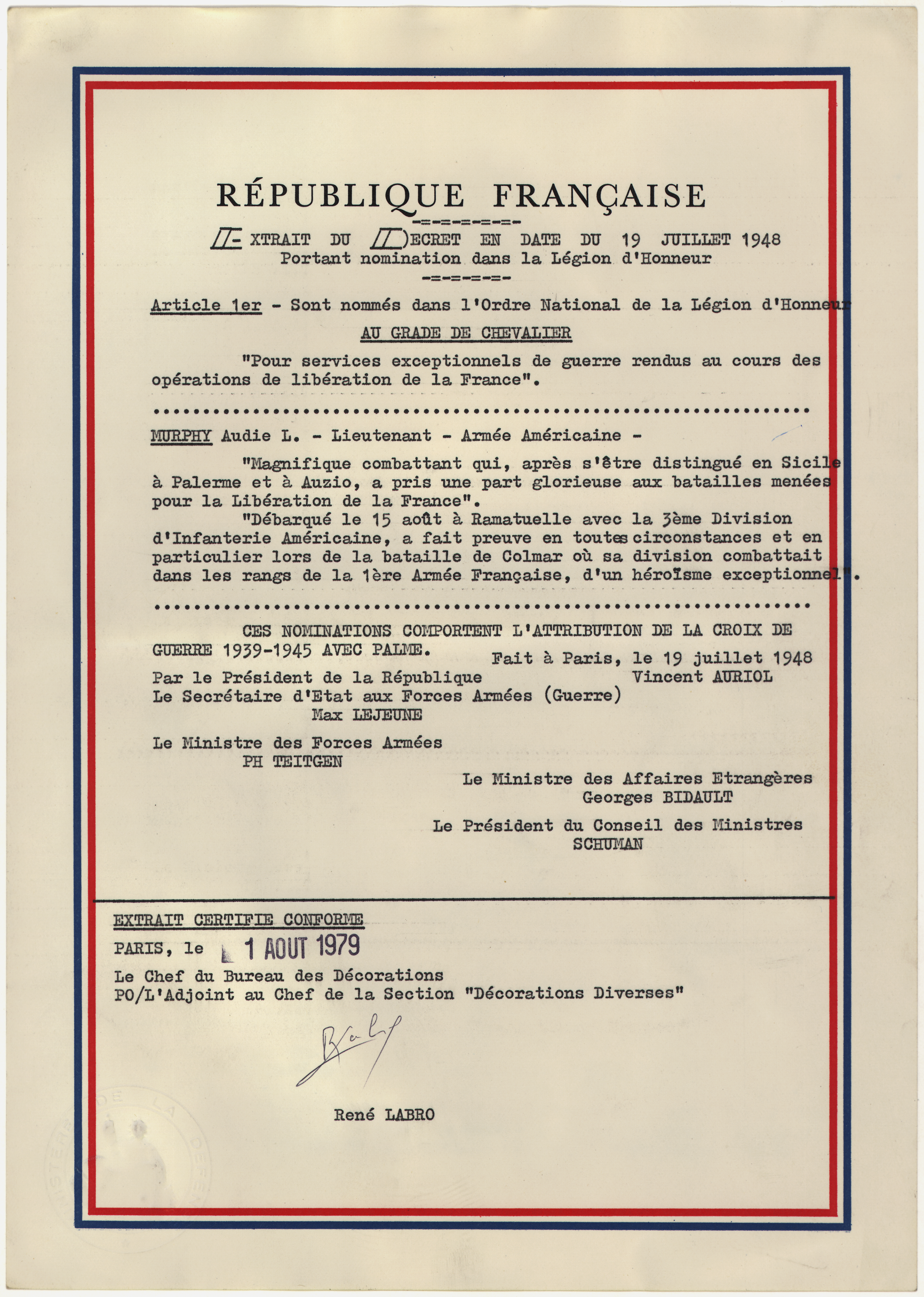
Murphy's award for the Chevalier of the Legion of Honor

Audie Murphy (20 June 1925 – 28 May 1971) was one of the most decorated United States Army combat soldiers of World War II, serving from 1942 to 1945. He received every American combat award for valor available at the time of his service, (Note: Murphy's war service was combat-related. Therefore, he did not receive the non-combat Soldier's Medal. Act of Congress (Public Law 446–69th Congress, 2 July 1926 (44 Stat. 780)) established the Soldier's Medal for heroism "as defined in 10 USC 101(d), at the time of the heroic act who distinguished himself or herself by heroism not involving actual combat with the enemy." At the end of his World War II service, Murphy became known as America's most decorated soldier.) including the Medal of Honor. He also received recognitions from France and Belgium. With his 1945 military discharge at the end of the war, Murphy became an advocate of treatment for post-traumatic stress disorder in veterans. The Audie L. Murphy Memorial VA Hospital in San Antonio and the Sergeant Audie Murphy Clubs (SAMC) on military bases honor his contributions. He joined the Texas National Guard in 1950, transferring to reserve status in 1956 and remaining in the Guard until 1969. He also had a civilian career as a film actor and songwriter. Recognitions he received both during his lifetime and also posthumously are listed below.

Murphy participated in campaigns in North Africa, Sicily, Italy, France and Germany, as denoted by his European-African-Middle Eastern Campaign Medal with one silver battle star (denoting five campaigns), four bronze battle stars, plus a bronze arrowhead representing his two amphibious assault landings at Sicily and southern France. On 25 February 1945 and 3 March 1945, he received two Silver Stars for further heroic actions. The French government awarded Murphy its Chevalier of the Legion of Honor and two Croix de guerre medals. He received the Croix de guerre 1940 Palm from Belgium. The military assisted him with replacement medals after he gave away the originals. (Note: During a 1955 appearance on the Colgate Comedy Hour, uploaded on YouTube as Audie Murphy Attends Beverly Hilton Grand Opening 1955, Murphy appears at 28:48 and briefly talks with Hedda Hopper about how he once gave his medals away but had them replaced by the U.S. Army.) Duplicates of his Medal of Honor and other medals can be viewed at Dallas Scottish Rite Temple museum.

== U.S. medals, awards, decorations and badges ==
=== U.S. military personal decorations ===
U.S. military personal decorations
Image	Decoration	Notes	Refs.
	Medal of Honor	For action on 26 January 1945, War Department, General Orders No. 65, 9 August 1945.	(Note: Recommended by Lt. Colonel Hallet D. Edson and Brigadier General R.B. Lovett.)
	Distinguished Service Cross	For action on 15 August 1944, Headquarters, Seventh U.S. Army, General Orders No. 21 (1945).	(Note: Eye witness account given by Staff Sergeant Norman Hollen.)
	Silver Star with bronze oak leaf cluster (two awards)	First award for action on 2 October 1944, Headquarters, 3rd Infantry Division, General Orders No. 66 (25 February 1945). Second award for action on 5 October 1944, Headquarters, 3rd Infantry Division, General Orders No. 83 (3 March 1945).	
	Legion of Merit	For action on 22 January 1944 – 18 February 1945, Headquarters, European Theater of Operations, General Orders No. 100 (25 May 1945).	
	Bronze Star with "V" Device and bronze oak leaf cluster (two awards)	First award with "V" Device for action on 2 March 1944, Headquarters, 3rd Infantry Division, General Orders No. 84 (4 March 1945). Second award for action on 8 May 1944.	
	Purple Heart with two bronze oak leaf clusters (three awards)	For wounds received 15 September 1944, 26 October 1944, and 25 January 1945.	

=== U.S. military unit awards ===
U.S. military unit awards
Image	Award	Notes	Refs.
	Presidential Unit Citation with First Oak Leaf Cluster (two awards)	First award with 1st Battalion, 15th Infantry Regiment for action 27–29 August 1944. Second award with the 3rd Infantry Division for action at the Colmar Pocket, 22 January – 6 February 1945.	

=== U.S. non-military personal decorations ===
U.S. non-military personal decorations
Image	Medal	Notes	Refs.
	Army Outstanding Civilian Service Medal	United States Army public service award established January 1959. It was awarded to Murphy in 1961 for his technical assistance on the Army's documentary The Broken Bridge.	(Note: Murphy received no monetary compensation for his services on the documentary.)

=== U.S. military service and campaign medals ===
Service and campaign medals
Image	Medal	Notes	Refs.
	Good Conduct Medal	Murphy attested at Fort Sam Houston, San Antonio, Texas, on 21 August 1945 that he had never received the Good Conduct Medal. He was awarded the medal the same day by Lieutenant Colonel H. Miller Ainsworth.	
	American Campaign Medal	For Murphy's service in the American Theater of World War II.	
	European-African-Middle Eastern Campaign Medal with one silver star (counts as 5 medals), four bronze stars, and one bronze arrowhead device	For Murphy's service in the European Theater of World War II in nine campaigns.	
	World War II Victory Medal	Awarded for military service between 7 December 1941, and 31 December 1946, both dates inclusive, the medal was authorized by Public Law 135, 79th United States Congress.	
	Army of Occupation Medal with Germany Clasp	For service in the occupation of Germany after the war.	
	Armed Forces Reserve Medal	For his service in the U.S. Army Officers' Reserve Corps and in the Texas National Guard. The medal was created by Executive Order 10163, signed by President Harry Truman on 25 September 1950. It is awarded for ten years service in the reserve components of the United States Armed Forces.	

=== Badges ===
U.S. Army badges
Image	Badge	Notes	Refs.
	Combat Infantryman Badge	Special Order No. 39, dated 8 May 1944, sixty-one officers and enlisted men of Company B, 15th Infantry were awarded the badge.	
	Marksman Badge with Rifle Component Bar	Earned during basic Army training.	
	Expert Badge with Bayonet Component Bar	Earned during basic Army training.	

== Non-U.S. military personal decorations, unit awards and service medals ==
Non-U.S. military service medals, awards and decorations
Image	Medal/award/decoration	Notes	Refs.
	French Legion of Honor – Grade of Chevalier (Knight)	Decoration presented by General de Lattre de Tassigny in Paris on 19 July 1948.	
	French Croix de Guerre with Silver Star	Decoration approved by the French government on 16 April 1945. Presented 19 September 1945 in Dallas by Brigadier General W. E. Collier, Chief of Staff for the 8th Service Command.	(Note: Not available for presentation until months after approval by the government of France.)
	French Croix de Guerre with Palm	Decoration presented in France on 19 July 1948.	
	Medal of a liberated France	Authorized by France 1947.	
	Belgian Croix de Guerre with 1940 Palm	Decoration conferred by Royal Order 4282 on 10 December 1955. The award and documentation were forwarded to the State Department to be held until the United States Congress authorized the acceptance and wearing of it. Murphy was notified by the Army on 14 March 1968, that he was allowed to accept the award.	
	French Fourragère in Colors of the Croix de Guerre	Award authorized to be worn by all members of the 3rd Infantry Division who fought in France during World War II.	

== U.S. State defense forces ==
U.S. State defense forces medals
Image	Medal	Notes	Refs.
width=106	Texas Legislative Medal of Honor	HCR3 introduced 20 July 2013, Signed by Gov Rick Perry 19 August 2013.	(Note: Army regulations dictate that U.S. state level awards follow all U.S. federal level and non-United States awards in order of precedence. The actual award was presented by Governor Rick Perry to Murphy's family on 29 October 2013, at a ceremony in Farmersville, Texas.)

== Service ranks ==
Audie Murphy promotions and commissions
Image	Rank	Service Branch	Date of promotion	Refs.
	Private	U.S. Army	30 June 1942	
	Private First Class	U.S. Army	7 May 1943	
	Corporal	U.S. Army	15 July 1943	
	Sergeant	U.S. Army	13 December 1943	
	Staff Sergeant	U.S. Army	13 January 1944	
	Second Lieutenant	U.S. Army	14 October 1944	
	First Lieutenant	U.S. Army	16 February 1945	
	First Lieutenant	U.S. Army Reserve	21 August 1945	
	Captain	Texas National Guard	14 July 1950	
	Captain	U.S. National Guard	19 October 1950	
	Major	U.S. National Guard	14 February 1956	
	Major	Texas National Guard	14 February 1956	
	Major	U.S. Army Reserve	8 November 1966	
	Major	U.S. Army Retired Reserve	22 May 1969	

== Other honors ==
=== Sergeant Audie Murphy Club ===
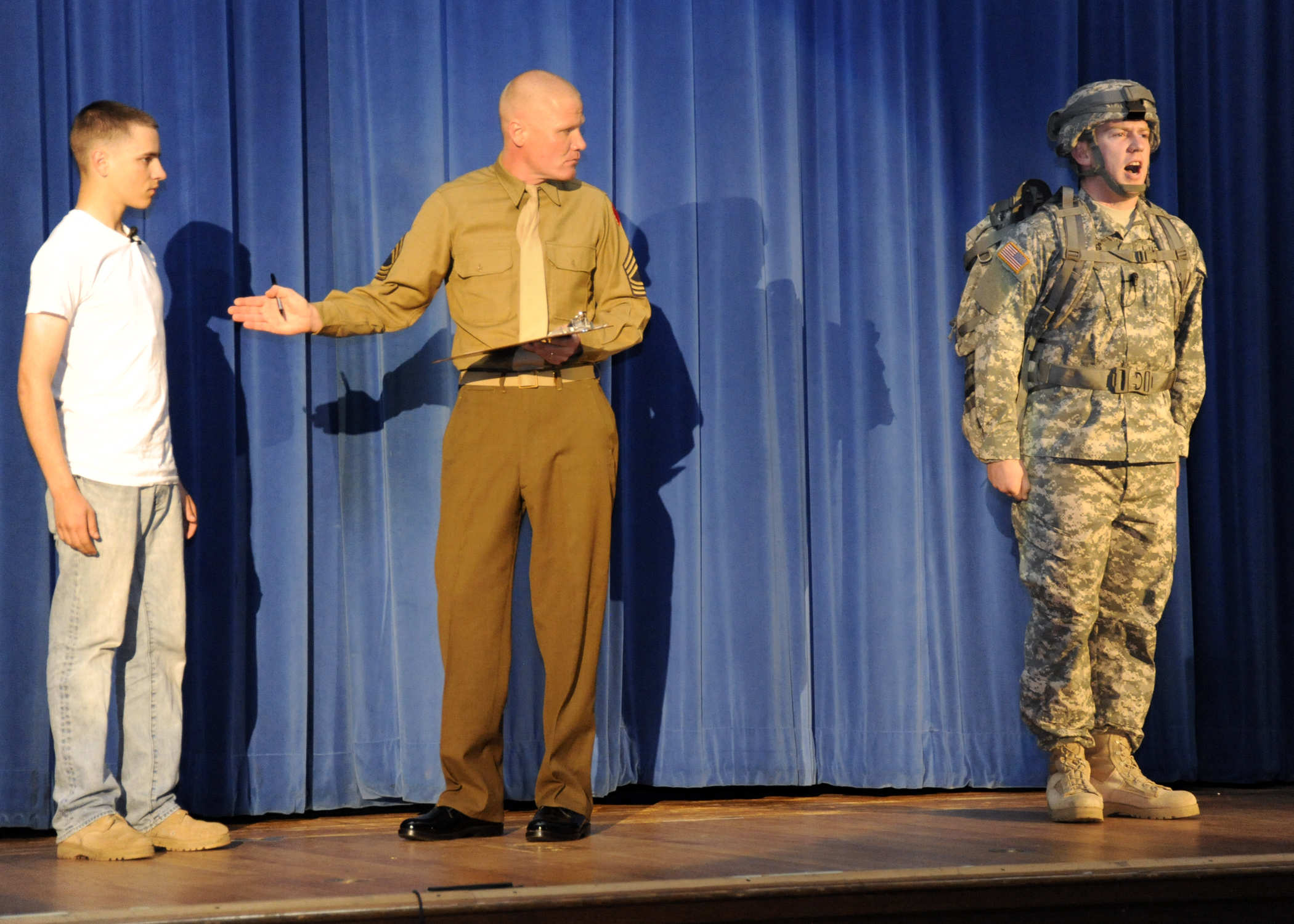
U.S. Soldiers reenactment of Audie Murphy military biography, SAMC, Fort Gordon, Ga., 12 Dec 2009

In September 1986, the Command Sergeant Major George L. Horvath III, III Corps Commander Lieutenant General Crosbie E. Saint and several others established the Sergeant Audie Murphy Club at Fort Hood, Texas. The official club crest was designed by club co-founder Don Moore. Since 1994, other units of the U.S. Army have established chapters of the Sergeant Audie Murphy Club (SAMC) as exclusive clubs to honor noncommissioned officers (Corporal E-4 through Sergeant First Class E-7) who have acted in a manner consistent with the actions of Audie Murphy. In 2012 a bronze bust created by Mark and Jenelle Byrd for display in the Sgt. Audie Murphy Club Room in Snow Hall was unveiled at Fort Sill, Oklahoma .

=== U.S. government, military and veterans organizations ===
- 1972 – Audie Murphy Gym dedicated at Fort Benning, Georgia. Its 2009 renovation included a name change to the Audie Murphy Athletic Performance Center.
- 1973 – Audie L. Murphy Memorial VA Hospital, San Antonio, Texas dedicated, featuring an outdoor 8-foot (2.4 m) bronze statue created by Jimilu Mason, funded by the Audie L. Murphy Foundation.
- 1985 – 6-foot (1.8 m) bronze statue at Camp Mabry, sculpted by West Texas artist Bill Leftwich, sponsored by the Texas National Guard.
- 30 May 1996 – Texas Congressman Ralph Hall commemorated the 25th anniversary of Murphy's death by reading "In Memory of Major Audie L. Murphy" and Murphy's poems, "Alone and Far Removed" and "Freedom Flies in Your Heart Like an Eagle" into the Congressional Record.
- 3 May 2000 – Murphy was honored with his portrait on a thirty-three cent United States postage stamp.
- 9 March 2001 – Camp Eagle military visitor lodging Audie Murphy Inn dedicated near Tuzla, Bosnia and Herzegovina by the 3rd Infantry Division.
- 28 May 2006 – a 16-by-8-inch (41 cm × 20 cm) commemorative plaque unveiled at Mount Soledad Veterans Memorial in La Jolla, California.
- September 2008 – American Legion Audie Murphy Post 336 chartered, San Antonio, Texas.
- Date unknown – Audie Murphy Award sponsored by the American Veterans Center, honoring veterans of World War II.

=== Texas (non-military) ===
- 1948 – Audie Murphy Arena, near Euless, Texas, was dedicated as a venue for the yearly Audie Murphy Rodeo. In 1952 the Rodeo moved to Stephenville, Texas, where it closed during the mid-1950s.
- 12 February 1949 – Murphy made an honorary Texas A&M University cadet colonel.
- 2 July 1949 – Murphy made an honorary Texas Ranger and chosen to lead the Texas Ranger Day parade in Brooks County.
- 1951 – Artist Kipp Soldwedel commissioned to paint Murphy's portrait, now owned by the State of Texas and hung in various locations in the Texas State Capitol.
- 1962 – Dallas artist Dmitri Vail commissioned to paint Murphy's portrait, believed to be owned by Murphy's family.
- 1973 – Texas State Historical Marker 7820 installed in Celeste, denoting Murphy's one-time residency.
- 1973 – Texas State Historical Marker 7821 installed in Kingston, denoting Murphy's birthplace.
- 1975 – Post Office, Greenville, Texas State Historical Marker 7799 denoted it as the site of Murphy's military enlistment; the building and it was added to the National Register of Historic Places listings in Hunt County, Texas, in 1974 . (Note: Conflicting information exists as to Murphy's date and place of enlistment. The Audie L. Murphy Memorial website has scanned documents from the U.S. National Archives and Records Administration that include Corinne Burns' statement and Murphy's "Induction Record", which shows him "Enlisted at Dallas, Texas" on 30 June 1942, and the line above it says "Accepted for service at Greenville, Texas". The National Register of Historic Places Listing added the Greenville post office as historic site number 74002081 in 1974, citing it as Murphy's place of enlistment, possibly referring to the act the military termed "Accepted for service". The NRHP also shows his enlistment date as 20 June 1942 which might be the date he was accepted for service.)
- 20 June 1996 – Texas Legislature officially declared his birthdate as "Audie Murphy Day".
- 1999, Memorial Day – Pink granite obelisk at Texas State Cemetery dedicated listing the names of all Texas-born Medal of Honor recipients, including Murphy.
- 22 June 2002 – Audie Murphy American Cotton Museum, Greenville, 10-foot (3.0 m) 2,200 pounds (1,000 kg) hollow bronze statue of Murphy sculpted by Gordon Thomas. (Note: In 1998, seven portraits were created by St. Louis, Missouri, artist Richard Krause and later donated to the Audie Murphy Research Foundation. The portraits are now on display at the museum. In 2012, the museum became the repository of memorabilia which had been on display at the Audie L. Murphy Memorial Veterans Hospital in San Antonio.)
- 2008 – Texas State Historical Marker 15321, Farmersville, denotes Murphy's post-war homecoming.
- 2010 – Audie Murphy Middle School established in Alamo.

=== Other U.S. states ===
- 1971 – Audie Murphy Patriotism Award. When Murphy's death on 28 May 1971, aborted his scheduled appearance at that year's 4 July Spirit of America Festival in Decatur, Alabama, the festival created the annual award in his memory.
- 11 November 1972 – Patriotic Hall. Los Angeles, California, 21.75 inches (0.552 m) by 31.75 inches (0.806 m) commemorative plaque listing medals won by Murphy during World War II.
- 10 November 1974 – Mounted plaque erected at Brush Mountain, Virginia, by Veterans of Foreign Wars Post 5311 of Christiansburg, Virginia, to commemorate the site of Murphy's death.

=== Non-United States ===
- 17 July 1948 – In Paris, Murphy made an honorary member in the 159th French Alpine Regiment.
- 14 October 1991 – Sierra Leone issued a postage stamp, Le 2 value, honors Murphy in To Hell and Back (Scott No. 1409).
- 18 October 1993 – Guyana issued a postage stamp of Murphy in uniform as part of a nine-stamp sheet in tribute to "World War II on the Silver Screen".
- 20 July 1995 – Nevis Island issued an eight-stamp souvenir sheet with Murphy in the top row.
- 29 January 2000 – Holtzwihr artist Patrick Baumann designed a commemorative plaque depicting Murphy on a tank destroyer, affixed to a wall at the site of the Medal of Honor action.
- 2001 – Republic of Palau Murphy commemorative stamp part of a four-stamp sheet "Remembering VJ Day".
- 9 June 2013 – Second free-standing commemorative plaque depicting Murphy firing the .50 caliber machine gun atop the tank unveiled at Holtzwihr by local authorities, the U.S. Consul General in Strasbourg, and representatives from American social organizations based in the Alsace region.

=== Entertainment industry ===
- Date unknown – Historical marker at Kanab, Utah's Walk of Fame denoting movies Murphy made in the state.
- 1959 – Laurel Award nominee for Top Action Performance in Ride a Crooked Trail.
- 9 February 1960 – Star on the Hollywood Walk of Fame.
- 23 August 1985 – Golden Boot Award.
- 16 March 1996 – Induction into the National Cowboy & Western Heritage Museum in Oklahoma City, Oklahoma.
- 2001 – Audie Murphy Theatrical Award.
- 11 November 2010 – Commemorative sidewalk plaque on the Santa Clarita Western Walk of Fame, Newhall, California.

=== Freemasonry ===
In November 2000, Murphy was posthumously awarded the Scottish Rite Masonry 33rd Degree in Long Beach, California, presented to his widow Pamela. From 1955 until his death, Murphy was a member of numerous Scottish Rite lodges in California and Texas. The Murat Shriners of Indianapolis, Indiana, provided the below timeline of Murphy's degrees and lodge associations. (Note: Murat Shriners of Indianapolis, Indiana, credits their information sources as the Grand Lodge of Texas and the book Audie Murphy, American Soldier by Harold Simpson.)

- 1955

14 February – Entered Apprentice degree, North Hollywood Lodge No. 542
4 April – Fellowcraft degree
27 June – Master Mason degree

- 1956 – Second North Hollywood membership, Magnolia Park No. 618
- 1957

11–14 November – degree work and 32nd degree Scottish Rite Temple in Dallas
Thomas B. Hunter Memorial Class vice president
15 November – Hella Temple, Dallas shriner

- 1965

14 November – Master of the Royal Secret, Valley of Dallas, Orient of Texas
11–1 December, 965 Knight Commander of the Court of Honor KCCH

- 1971

19 March – Al Malaikah Temple in Los Angeles
2 April – Long Beach Scottish Rite Bodies

== Books ==
- Murphy, Audie (2002) [1949]. To Hell and Back. New York: Henry Holt and Co. ISBN 978-0-8050-7086-6.
