= Greenville station (disambiguation) =

Greenville station is an Amtrak train station in Greenville, South Carolina, United States.

Greenville station may also refer to:

- Greenville station (Texas), a museum
- Greenville station (Central Railroad of New Jersey), a former station in Bayonne, New Jersey
- Greenville Station, a community in Nova Scotia, Canada
