= Mayo Hall (Commerce, Texas) =

- Formerly listed on the U.S. National Register of Historic Places
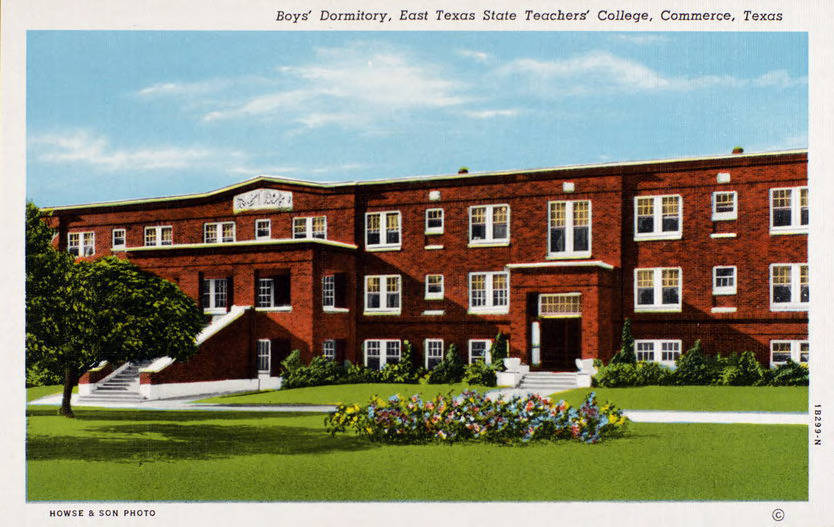
- Postcard depicting Mayo Hall, then the Boys' Dormitory, in 1941

- Location within Texas Location within the United States
- Location: Monroe and Stonewall Sts., Commerce, Texas
- Coordinates: 33°14′33″N 95°54′12″W
- Area: less than one acre
- Built: 1936
- Architect: William E. Ketchum, Hugh L. White
- Architectural style: Institutional
- NRHP reference No.: 03000727

Significant dates
- Added to NRHP: July 31, 2003
- Removed from NRHP: October 12, 2010

Mayo Hall, also known as Boys' Dormitory or Men's Dormitory, was a building in Commerce, Texas on the campus of Texas A&M University-Commerce that was built in 1936 with much of the $115,000 cost coming from the Public Works Administration. The hall housed seventy students and had a cafeteria and recreation room. The building was listed on the National Register of Historic Places in 2003 and removed seven years later. The hall was demolished in February 2008.

== See also ==
- National Register of Historic Places listings in Hunt County, Texas
