= Central Christian Church (Greenville, Texas) =

Historic church in Texas, United States

- U.S. National Register of Historic Places
- Recorded Texas Historic Landmark
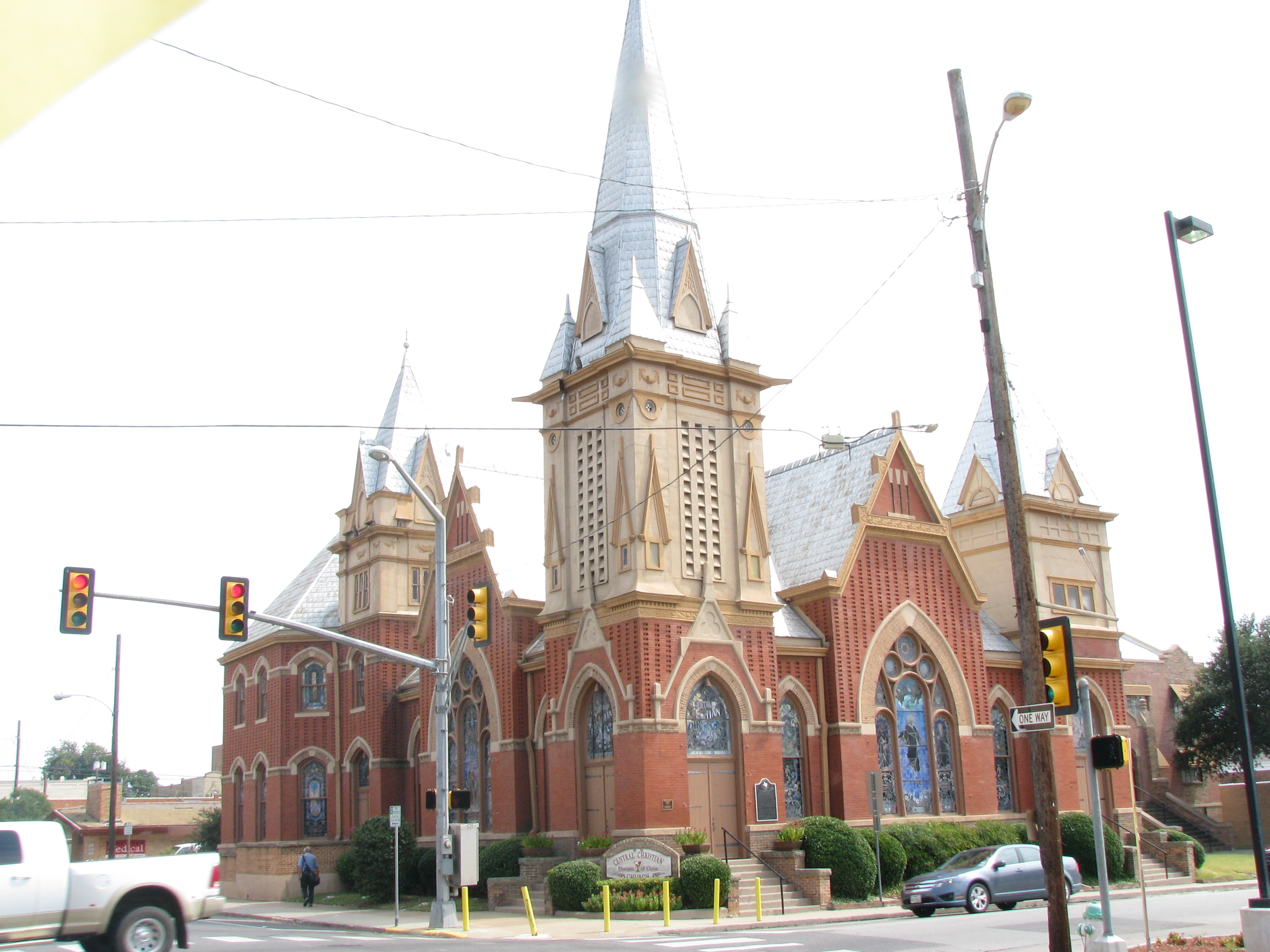
- Central Christian Church in 2013

- Location within Texas Location within the United States
- Location: 2611 Wesley St., Greenville, Texas
- Coordinates: 33°8′19″N 96°6′30″W
- Area: less than one acre
- Built: 1899
- Architect: James E. Flanders, R.W. Ragsdale
- Architectural style: Late Gothic Revival
- NRHP reference No.: 03001376
- RTHL No.: 7776

Significant dates
- Added to NRHP: January 6, 2004
- Designated RTHL: 1989

Central Christian Church is a historic church at 2611 Wesley Street in Greenville, Texas.

It was built in 1899 and added to the National Register of Historic Places in 2004.

== See also ==
- National Register of Historic Places listings in Hunt County, Texas
- Recorded Texas Historic Landmarks in Hunt County
