= Post Office Building (Greenville, Texas) =

- U.S. National Register of Historic Places
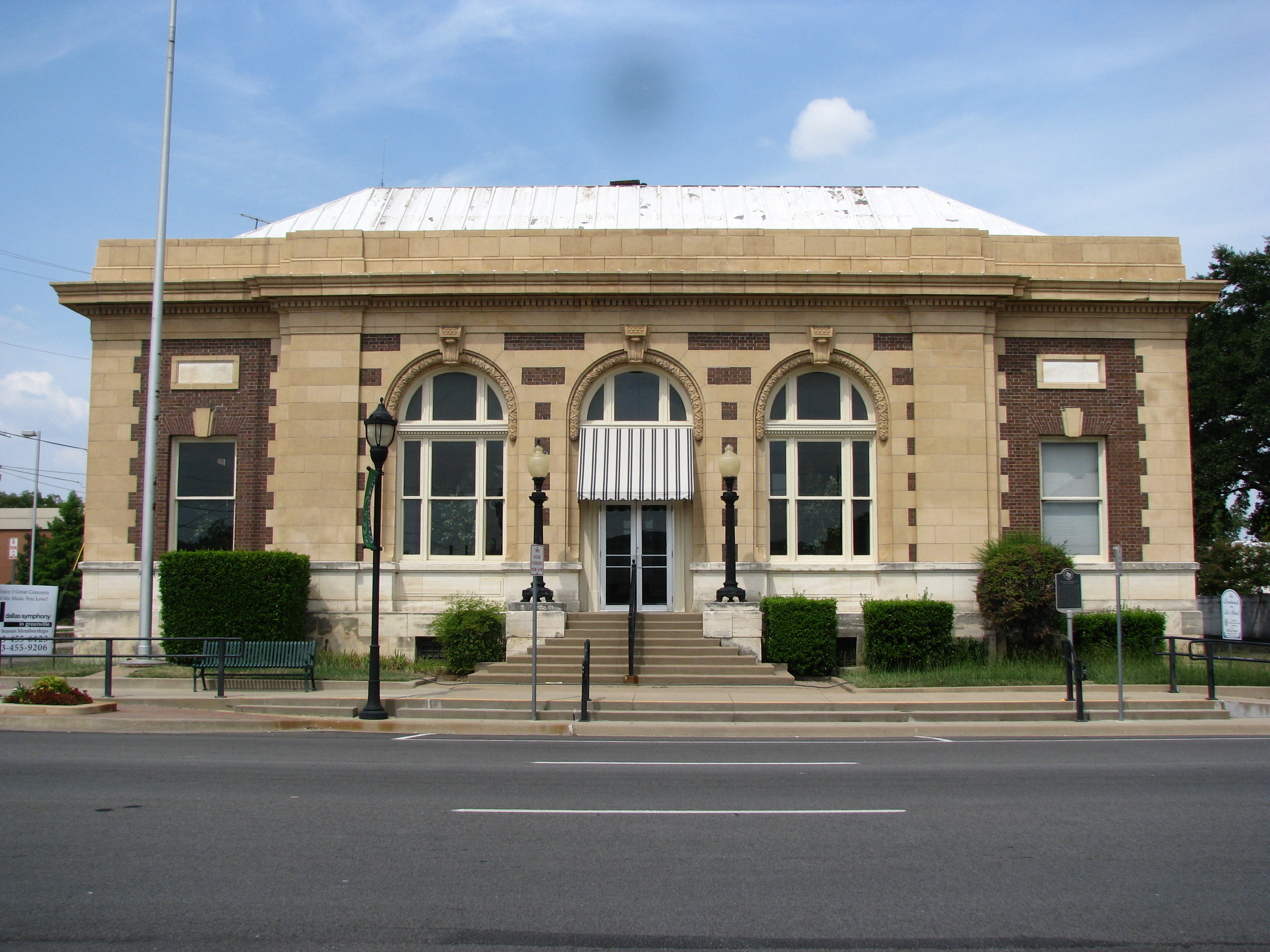
- Post Office Building in 2013

- Location within Texas Location within the United States
- Location: Lee at King St., Greenville, Texas
- Coordinates: 33°8′24″N 96°6′37″W
- Area: 1 acre (0.40 ha)
- Built: 1919
- Architect: James Knox Taylor
- Architectural style: Classical Revival
- NRHP reference No.: 74002081
- Added to NRHP: August 7, 1974

The Post Office Building in Greenville, Texas, was built in 1910. It was listed on the National Register of Historic Places in 1974. It was at this post office on June 20, 1942, that Audie Murphy enlisted in the United States Army.

== See also ==
- National Register of Historic Places listings in Hunt County, Texas
