= Central Christian Church (Dallas, Texas) =

Coordinates: 32.8295°N 96.8192°W

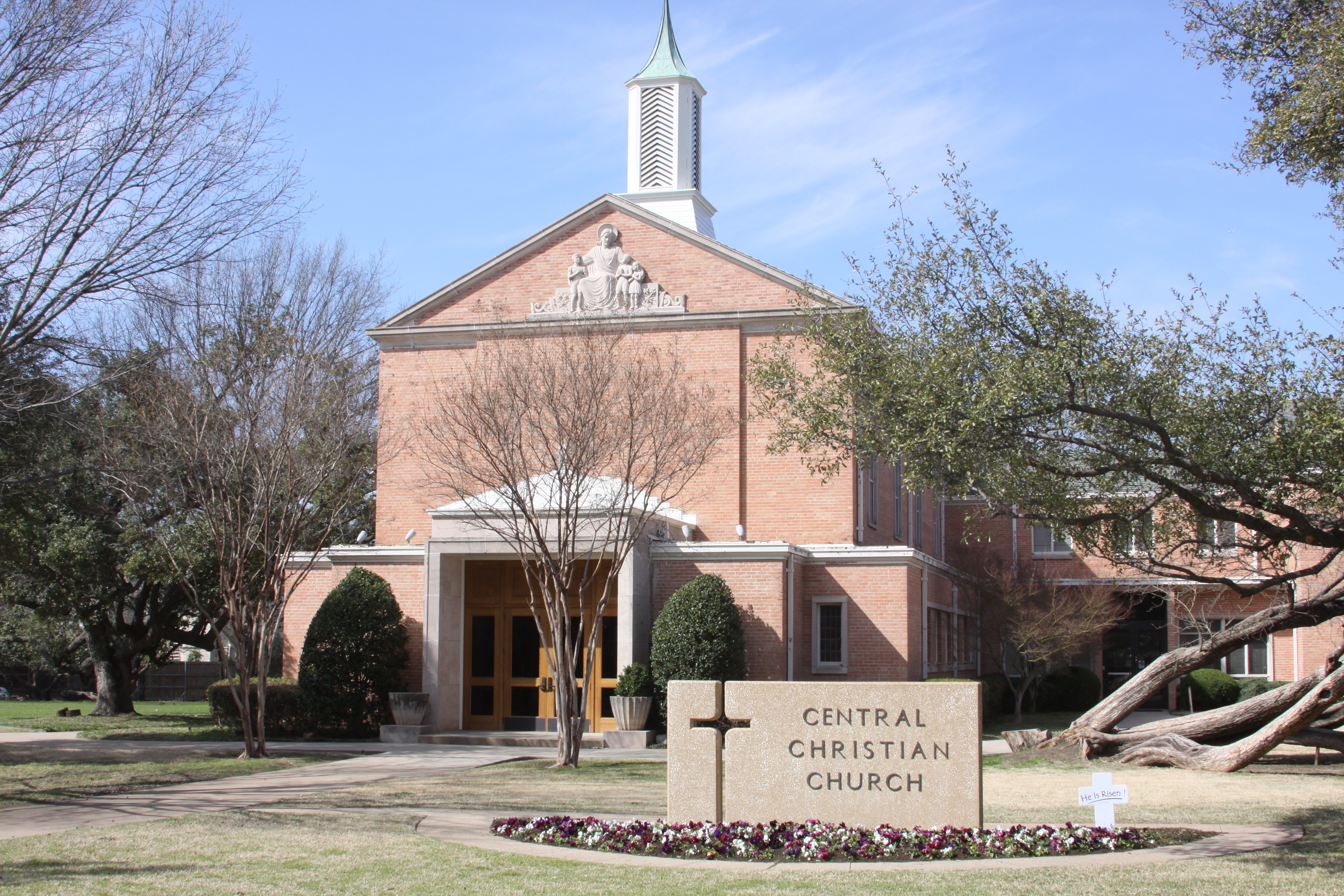
- Central Christian Church in Dallas, Texas
- Central Christian Church
- Location: 4711 Westside Drive, Dallas, Texas
- Denomination: Protestant

Central Christian Church (Disciples of Christ) of Dallas, Texas was the longest continuously operating Protestant congregation founded within the city limits of Dallas, at the time of its permanent closure in 2021. It had been founded in a room above a blacksmith shop in 1863, as the Civil War raged.

The church, located at 4711 Westside Drive, marked its 150th anniversary in 2013. The church was a member congregation of the Christian Church (Disciples of Christ), a mainline Protestant Christian denomination in North America.

In 2021, the church announced that it would cease worship in April 2021. Its final service was Easter Sunday of that month, with Rev. Ken Crawford bringing the final sermon.

== History ==
Organized in 1863, under the headship of teacher and preacher Charles Carlton, the congregation originally held services in Mr. Carlton’s log cabin schoolroom in present-day Downtown Dallas.

The meetings were moved a few months later to the records building of the Dallas County Courthouse in downtown Dallas. The congregation met in the courthouse for about a year before deciding that they needed a meeting space of their own, separate from a government building.

In 1867, the church built a small meeting house two blocks from the courthouse in an area that is now called The West End Historic District of Downtown Dallas.

To commemorate where the original church once stood, a Texas Historical marker was installed on a two story red brick building at 703 Ross Ave. on December 4, 1938—a building that once housed the city police station and jail.

In 1876, the gift of an organ caused a division among the parishioners. Some members were opposed to instrumental music within the church. The Rev. Kirk Baxter and those members who desired the addition of the musical instrument began temporary meetings in the Main Street Opera House. A new sanctuary was built in 1878 on Commerce Street at the site of the former Statler Hilton Hotel building. The church adopted the name Commerce Street Christian Church.

Nine ministers served the Commerce Street Christian Church between 1878 and 1891.

In 1891, while Mr. J. F. Toof was pastor, the congregation moved to a new and larger building at St. Paul and Patterson streets and the name Central Christian Church was chartered. The church remained at this location for the next 60 years.

In 1951, Central Christian Church sold the St. Paul/Patterson location and purchased land at 4711 Westside Drive, the present day location of the church. Construction started on the Westside location in April 1952, and the new sanctuary was dedicated during a service on Sunday, May 3, 1953.

== Ministry ==
The Christian Church was a charter participant in the formation of both the World Council of Churches and the Federal Council of Churches (now the National Council of Churches), and it continues to be engaged in ecumenical conversations.

The Disciples' local churches are congregationally governed.

Although many ministers led the congregation of Central Christian Church throughout the history of the church, a few stand out due to tenure and epoch.

Dr. Graham Frank served as pastor from 1917 until 1942. He served as General Secretary of the International Convention of Christian Churches, was one of the founders of the World Council of Churches and a participant on three World Conferences on Christian Unity. The Centennial issue of The Dallas Times Herald, February 5, 1956, listed Dr. Frank as one of the eleven outstanding pastors in Dallas.

Dr. William C. Jones, 1944-1953, led the church through the difficult years following World War II and the interim between the old downtown building and the erection of the new building. Illness required his resignation.

Dr. E. C. Rowand, Jr. took leadership of the congregation in 1953, shortly after dedication of the new building, and served 25 years. The church saw rapid growth under his direction and double services had to be inaugurated to accommodate the attendance.

== Building ==
The building was designed by the Texas architectural firm Bennett & Crittenden, (also architects for First Methodist Church of Wichita Falls). The Sanctuary located on the southern portion of the site, is a masonry veneer structure on a steel frame. The form is Neo-classical, with a center entry portal and symmetric side wings. It has a front facing gable, with an ornamental bas-relief tympanum of stone. The roof is crowned with a classical four sided copper roofed cupola and spire. Windows of the sanctuary are stained glass with Christian symbols including the fleur de lis, chalice and chi-rho.

The educational wing of the building is built in the north of the sanctuary. The roof is a series of gable roofs. The windows of the building are punched openings in a continuous pattern. The window units are steel casement in a two over one operable hopper configuration.

Built at a cost of $225,000, the original sanctuary has a seating capacity of 400. Interior woodwork, as well as furnishings, was oak in a light finish, typical of church interior of this time period.

The church sits on a 5.9 acre-lot accommodating a meditation garden, community dog park, soccer field and community vegetable garden.

Meditation Garden

Located just behind the church, the garden is a small landscaped area with seating for prayer and meditation.

Community Dog Park

Nearly one acre of the grounds is a secure, fenced area providing a place for people to be in touch with nature and their dog. The dog park is equipped with seating, fans, statuary, a bathing station and drinking bowls. It is located behind the main campus and is open to the public. The dog park was named as the best dog park in Dallas in 2012 by The Dallas Observer best dog park in Dallas.

Soccer Field

The field is located south of the sanctuary providing a place for the Park Cities YMCA Y-Sports 4 and 5 year olds to practice and play and for neighboring children to gather with friends.

Acers Community Garden

On the southern part of the campus is the organic vegetable and herb garden, named for church members, Dallas real estate icon Ebby Halliday and her late husband, Maurice Acers. Gardner Russell Church, a member of the congregation, oversees the garden. The garden is maintained by volunteers of the church and benefits the neighboring community. A portion of the harvest is donated to Dallas Shared Ministries Food Bank.
