= Greenville station (Texas) =

- Katy Depot
- U.S. National Register of Historic Places
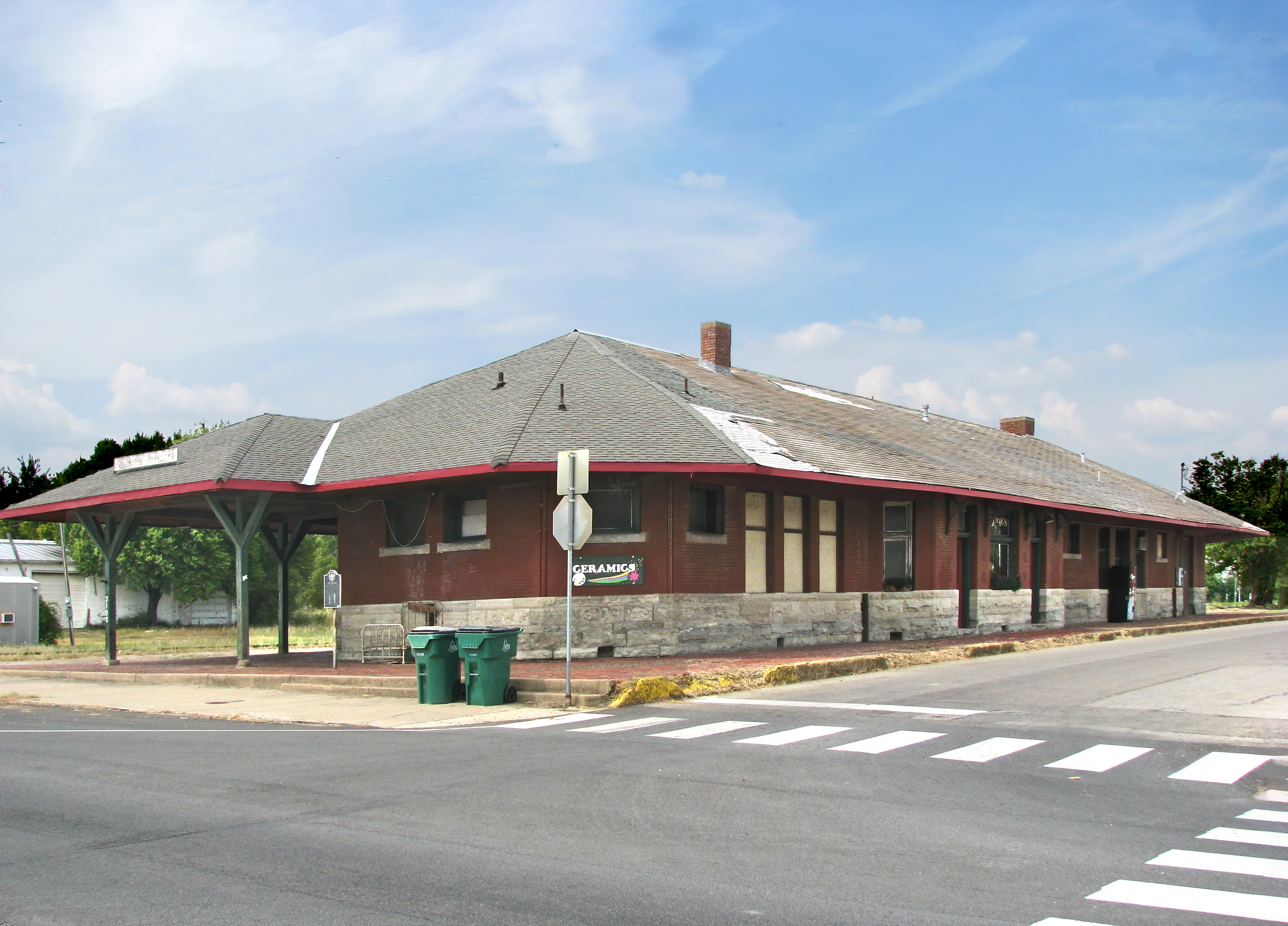
- Katy Depot in 2013

- Location within Texas Location within the United States
- Location: 3102 Lee St., Greenville, Texas
- Coordinates: 33°8′25″N 96°6′44″W
- Area: 3.3 acres (1.3 ha)
- Built: 1896
- Built by: Thompson & P.Gray
- Architect: Stephen W. Dodge
- Architectural style: Late Victorian
- NRHP reference No.: 96001625
- Added to NRHP: January 25, 1997

The Greenville station, also known as Katy Depot, is a train depot constructed in 1896 in Greenville, Texas. It was operated by the Missouri, Kansas and Texas Railway Company. It was registered in the United States National Register of Historic Places on January 25, 1997.

The building's foundation is made of limestone, and its walls are built of red brick with cut sandstone wainscoting.

The train depot is also home to the Greenville Railroad Museum.

President Harry Truman stopped at the station in 1948 during his “whistle stop” campaign tour.

== See also ==
- National Register of Historic Places listings in Hunt County, Texas

Preceding station	Missouri–Kansas–Texas Railroad	Following station
Rockwall toward Galveston	Main Line via Dallas	Celeste toward St. Louis
