= 78th Army Band =

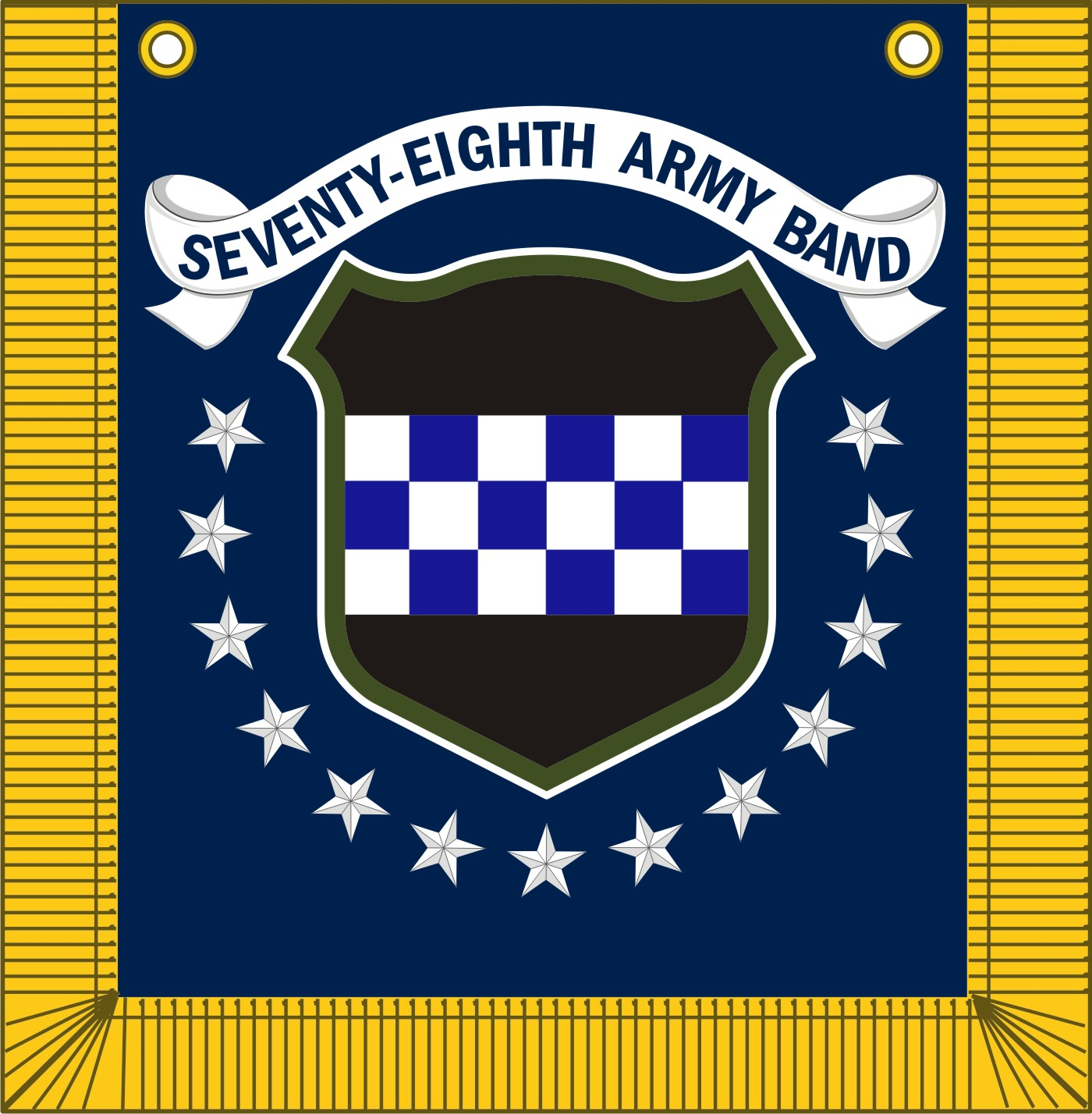
- 78th Army Band logo and tabard
- Active: 1943-present
- Country: United States
- Branch: Army Reserve
- Size: 48 Soldiers
- Garrison/HQ: ASA Fort Dix (Joint Base McGuire-Dix-Lakehurst), NJ Fort Totten, NY
- Motto(s): Checkmate
- March: 99th Infantry Division March
- Engagements: Rhineland; Ardennes-Alsace; Central Europe; European Theater

Commanders
- Current commander: CW4 Luis Santiago

The 78th Army Band, United States Army Reserve, is a musical organization under the 99th Reserve Support Command. It was established on 1 October 2008, as part of the Army Reserve Transformation process and was posted at Fort Dix, New Jersey. On 29 June 2018, the 78th Army Band integrated members of the 319th Army Band following its inactivation, ensuring the presence of Army Music in the highly sought-after New York City market.

In addition to its concert and ceremonial and concert bands, the 78th Army Band also features a diverse array of musical ensembles, including a jazz combo, brass quintet, Dixie-land band, and a rock band known as "Checkmate". Currently, the band's members are from Delaware, Maryland, New Jersey, New York, Pennsylvania, Kentucky, and Virginia.

As an Army Reserve band, the 78th trains and performs one weekend a month and performs two weeks of active duty each year.

== Leadership ==
Commander	CW4 Luis Santiago
Executive Officer	CW2 Hugh Stuart
Executive Officer	WO1 Joseph Young
First Sergeant	1SG Brian Endlein
Operations / Training AGR	SFC Joshua Meyer
Drum Majors	SSG Andrew Lutter SSG Joseph Naples
Training NCO	SFC Christina Greenway
Supply NCO	SFC Leslie Rickert
Operations NCO	SFC David Federico
HR NCO	SGT Brian Freedman

== Musical performance teams ==
The 78th Army Band consists of several small performance ensembles, including:

Ensemble	OIC/NCOIC
Concert Band	CW4 Santiago
Ceremonial / Marching Band	1SG Endlein
Big Band	VACANT
Fort Dixieland Band	SFC Greeson
Brass Quintet	SFC Tedrick
Liberty Vibes	SFC Kattan
"Checkmate" Popular Music Group	SFC Federico

== Contact ==
As an Army Reserve band the 78th Army Band offers musicians the opportunity to serve their country through music while securing funding to help them pay for college. The band can be reached by contacting the full-time staff at 609-562-7914.

== Public performances ==
Beyond military ceremonial performances, the 78th Army Band frequently performs community relations performances. These performances often include high school and community concerts, parades and other such performances as requested by members of the community at large.

A list of the band's public performance is available from Army Bands Online

Notable performances

- U.S. Army War College Commencement, Carlisle Barracks, Pennsylvania, Annual Performance
- Tour in Germany, 1992
- U.S. Capitol, Washington, D.C., 1992
- U.S. National Memorial Day Parade, Washington, D.C., 2008
- National Boy Scout Jamboree, Fort A.P. Hill, Virginia, 2010
- Presidential visit to Joint Base McGuire-Dix-Lakehurst, 2014

== Lineage and honors ==
Lineage and honors information correct as of 20 March 2009

- Constituted 2 August 1943 in the Organized Reserves as the Band, 78th Infantry Division
- Activated 9 August 1943 at Camp Butner, North Carolina
- Redesignated 1 December 1943 as the 78th Infantry Division Band
- Inactivated 22 May 1946 in Germany

(Organized Reserves redesignated 25 March 1948 as the Organized Reserve Corps; redesignated 9 July 1952 as the Army Reserve

- Activated 1 October 1950 at Newark, New Jersey
- Location changed 9 November 1955 to Kearny, New Jersey; on 6 December 1958 to Edison, New Jersey
- Reorganized and redesignated 1 May 1959 as the 78th Division Band
- Consolidated 31 January 1968 with the Support Company, 78th Division (Training) and consolidated unit reorganized and redesignated as the Support Company and Band, 78th Division (Training)
- Reorganized and redesignated 1 September 1970 as Headquarters and Headquarters Company and Band, 78th Support Battalion, an element of the 78th Division (Training)
- Reorganized and redesignated 1 August 1971 as Headquarters and Headquarters Detachment and Band, 78th Support Battalion, an element of the 78th Division (Training)
- Band element withdrawn 16 November 1982 and redesignated as the 878th Army Band, an element of the 78th Division (Training) (Headquarters and Headquarters Detachment, 78th Support Battalion—hereafter separate lineage)
- Reorganized and redesignated 17 September 1983 as the band element of Headquarters Company, 78th Division (Training)
- Band element withdrawn 16 September 1988 from Headquarters Company, 78th Division (Training); concurrently reorganized and redesignated as the 78th Division Band

Original order issuing M.U.C.

(78th Division [Training] reorganized and redesignated 1 October 1993 as the 78th Division [Exercise]; on 17 October 1999 as the 78th Division [Training Support])

- Relieved 1 April 2007 from assignment to the 78th Division (Training Support)
- Reorganized and redesignated 16 October 2008 as the 78th Army Band; concurrently location changed to Fort Dix, New Jersey

The current 78th Army Band also incorporates several previous Army bands:

- 19th Army Band, Fort Dix, NJ
- 307th Army Band, Norristown, PA
- 78th Infantry Division Band, Edison, NJ
- 276th Pennsylvania Guard Band, Philadelphia, PA

78th Army Band Honors

Campaign participation credit

- World War II: Rhineland; Ardennes-Alsace; Central Europe

Decorations

- Streamer embroidered EUROPEAN THEATER
- Meritorious Unit Commendation (Army)

== Heraldric devices ==
The 78th Army Band has its own collection of heraldric devices, including a baldric, mace, tabard, drum design and unit tab for wear on the uniform.

Drum major baldric	Drum major mace	Snare drum design, including recognition of campaign participation Unit tab, worn above unit patch on left sleeve Herald trumpet tabard
