= National Register of Historic Places listings in Hunt County, Texas =

Location of Hunt County in Texas

This is a list of the National Register of Historic Places listings in Hunt County, Texas.

This is intended to be a complete list of properties and districts listed on the National Register of Historic Places in Hunt County, Texas. There are eight properties listed on the National Register in the county. Four of these are also designated Recorded Texas Historic Landmarks.

This National Park Service list is complete through NPS recent listings posted May 9, 2025.

== Current listings ==
The locations of National Register properties may be seen in a mapping service provided.

	Name on the Register	Image	Date listed	Location	City or town	Description
1	William and Medora Camp House	William and Medora Camp House	November 14, 1988 (#88002130)	2620 Church St. 33°08′34″N 96°06′27″W	Greenville	Recorded Texas Historic Landmark
2	Central Christian Church	Central Christian Church	January 6, 2004 (#03001376)	2611 Wesley St. 33°08′19″N 96°06′30″W	Greenville	Recorded Texas Historic Landmark
3	Greenville Masonic Lodge No. 335 A.F. & A.M.		October 30, 2023 (#100009494)	2615 Stonewall St. 33°08′18″N 96°06′26″W	Greenville	
4	Hunt County Courthouse	Hunt County Courthouse	June 21, 1996 (#96000688)	2500 Lee St. 33°08′22″N 96°06′23″W	Greenville	Recorded Texas Historic Landmark
5	Katy Depot	Katy Depot	January 25, 1997 (#96001625)	3102 Lee St. 33°08′25″N 96°06′44″W	Greenville	
6	Post Office Building	Post Office Building	August 7, 1974 (#74002081)	Lee at King St. 33°08′24″N 96°06′39″W	Greenville	
7	President's House	President's House	November 21, 2001 (#01001264)	SW of Circle Dr., N of Stonewall St., bet. Campbell and Bois D'Arc Sts. 33°14′33″N 95°54′18″W	Commerce	Recorded Texas Historic Landmark
8	Washington Hotel	Washington Hotel	November 27, 2010 (#10000962)	2612 Washington Street; 33°08′21″N 96°06′28″W	Greenville	

=== Former listings ===
	Name on the Register	Image	Date listed	Date removed	Location	City or town	Description
1	Blanton School		September 12, 2006 (#06000823)	June 3, 2009	610 E Witt St. 33°22′07″N 96°04′03″W	Wolfe City	Torn down August 7, 2008.
2	Mayo Hall	Mayo Hall	July 31, 2003 (#03000727)	October 12, 2010	Monroe and Stonewall Sts. 33°14′33″N 95°54′12″W	Commerce	Delisted after being torn down.

== See also ==
- National Register of Historic Places listings in Texas
- Recorded Texas Historic Landmarks in Hunt County
