= Central Christian Church (Lexington, Kentucky) =

- U.S. National Register of Historic Places
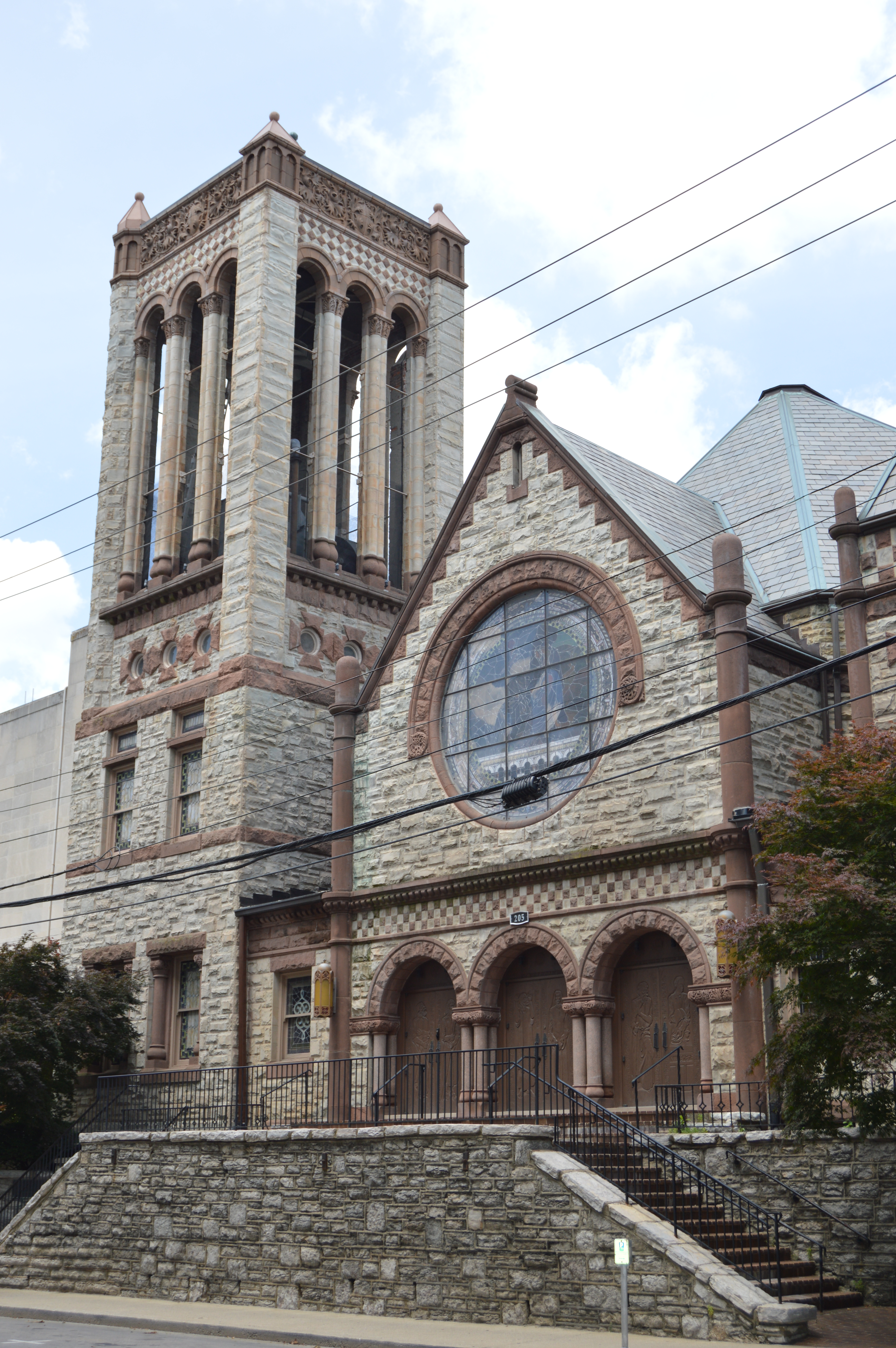
- Front

- Location within Kentucky Location within the United States
- Location: 207 E. Short St., Lexington, Kentucky
- Coordinates: 38°02′44″N 84°29′39″W
- Area: less than one acre
- Built: 1893-94, 1952
- Built by: Walker, John H.
- Architect: Smith Bros.
- Architectural style: Romanesque, Richardsonian Romanesque
- NRHP reference No.: 79000975
- Added to NRHP: September 11, 1979

The Central Christian Church in Lexington, Kentucky, is a historic church at 205 E. Short Street, and an active congregation of the Christian Church (Disciples of Christ). The church was founded by Barton Stone and was the place where the Stone and Campbell movements united to form in 1832 as part of the Restoration Movement. The church was previously known as Hill Street Christian Church and Main Street Christian Church.

The current building is part of the U.S. National Register of Historic Places.

== Founding & Hill Street Christian Church (1816 to 1841) ==
Stone, the leader of the Cane Ridge Revival in nearby Paris, Kentucky, began preaching in Lexington in 1815. In 1816, the first Christian church following the Stone Movement in Lexington was founded.

In 1831, the group built a meeting house on Hill Street (present day High Street in Lexington) and became the Hill Street Christian Church.

On January 1, 1832, the Stone and Campbell movements merged to form the unified Restoration Movement. Barton Stone shook hands with "Raccoon" John Smith, who represented the Campbell movement.

The Hill Street building was demolished in the 1970s.

== Main Street Christian Church (1842 to 1894) ==
By the 1840s, the church had outgrown the Hill Street building. In 1842, they constructed a new church building on Main Street and became the Main Street Christian Church. The building included a recessed portico and Doric columns.

In November 1843, the church hosted a debate between Alexander Campbell and Nathan Rise, a Presbyterian minister, about baptism, the spirit, and creeds. The debate was moderated by Henry Clay.

The Main Street building was demolished in 1903 and a local government building occupies the land.

== Central Christian Church (1894 to Pres.) ==
In the late 19th century, the church had outgrown the Main Street building and built a new building on Short and Mill Streets in 1893. The church building on Short Street opened in 1894, and was added to the U.S. National Register of Historic Places in 1979. The church changed their name to Central Christian Church.

The stone portion of the church was built during 1893 to 1894; brick portions were added in 1952. It is notable as "the major surviving Richardsonian Romanesque structure in Lexington"; it was designed by architects Edwin W. and Frank L. Smith.
