= Central Christian Church (Indianapolis, Indiana) =

Church in Indianapolis, Indiana

Coordinates: 39°46′37″N 86°09′12″W

General information
- Address: 701 North Delaware Street, Indianapolis, Indiana
- Town or city: Indianapolis, Indiana
- Country: United States

Central Christian Church, also known in its early years as the Church of Christ in Indianapolis and Christian Chapel, is located at 701 North Delaware Street in downtown Indianapolis, Indiana. Its members formally organized on June 12, 1833, as the city's first Christian Church (Disciples of Christ) congregation. The congregation formally adopted the name of Central Christian Church on February 3, 1879. Its red brick and stone masonry Romanesque Revival-style church was dedicated in 1893. Building additions were completed in 1913 and in 1922. The church continues to serve the Indianapolis community and holds weekly worship services.

Members of the Indianapolis Disciples of Christ congregation, along with others around the state, were instrumental in establishing North Western Christian University, present-day Butler University, which opened for student enrollment in 1855. The congregation was also active in missionary work and acted as host to several annual meetings of the Indiana Christian Missionary Society, which the congregation helped to organized in 1849, and the American Christian Missionary Society. Church members also formed a women's mission society and hosted the executive committee of the national Christian Woman's Board of Missions. The church helped to establish other Disciples of Christ congregations in Indianapolis, including the Second Christian Church, the city's first African American Christian Church (Disciples of Christ) congregation in 1866. Central Christian Church became known for its music and educational programs, community outreach, and foreign ministry. Notable church members include Ovid Butler, a local lawyer who helped found North Western Christian University, and temperance movement advocate and women's suffrage leader Zerelda G. Wallace.

== History ==
=== Origins ===
In 1833 a group of five congregations of New Light and Baptist reformers in Rush County, Indiana, selected missionary evangelist John O'Kane to organize the first Church of Christ in Indianapolis that later became known as Central Christian Church. The congregation initially met in a log cabin belonging to Benjamin Roberts and was formally organized on June 12, 1833. Charter members of Indianapolis's first Christian Church (Disciples of Christ) congregation included John J. Sanders, a local physician, and his family; Benjamin Roberts; and Peter Roberts. The Church of Christ in Indianapolis was the city's fourth religious congregation, preceded by the Baptists, Presbyterians, and Methodists.

=== First meetinghouse ===
Indianapolis's first Church of Christ congregation met at various sites until 1837, when its first meetinghouse was erected on the south side of Kentucky Avenue, between Capitol and Senate Avenues. The church building, which is no longer standing, had two front doors, one for men and one for women. A low partition installed along the church's center interior aisle separated the sexes during worship services. In 1839 the congregation's first meetinghouse served as the site of the first statewide meeting of the Disciples of Christ in Indiana. In 1849 a group gathered at the church to organize the Indiana Christian Missionary Society.

=== Christian Chapel ===
In 1852 the Indianapolis congregation's new brick church was completed at the corner of Delaware and Ohio Streets. The new building became known as Christian Chapel.

Members of the Indianapolis Disciples of Christ congregation, along with others around the state, were instrumental in organizing North Western Christian University (present-day Butler University) in the 1850s. On July 27, 1852, the university's first board of directors met at the church to discuss plans to build the first building on the site of its first campus at Thirteenth Street and College Avenue in Indianapolis. (The university opened for student enrollment in 1855.)

In addition, the Christian Chapel congregation was active in missionary work. Annual meetings of the Indiana and American Christian Missionary Societies were held at the chapel in October 1872. In 1874 a group of women from Christian Chapel organized a women's mission society. Many of the Indianapolis Disciples of Christ congregation's women went on to hold leadership positions in the state and national Christian Woman's Board of Missions, which was established later that year. The group became a sponsor of a global evangelic and service ministry. The national board's executive committee held its first meeting at Christian Chapel.

=== Central Christian Church ===
On February 3, 1879, the Christian Chapel congregation adopted the name of Central Christian Church. By the mid-1870s there were six Disciples of Christ congregations in Indianapolis. Conflicts between the denomination's members forced its division into two groups, the Christian Church (Disciples of Christ) and a smaller group known as the Churches of Christ. The Central Christian Church congregation remained a part of the Disciples of Christ.

In 1883, Zerelda G. Wallace, a charter member of the Indianapolis congregation who became an outspoken temperance movement advocate, women's suffrage leader, and the wife of former Indiana governor David Wallace, refused wine offered during Holy Communion because of her opposition to the consumption of alcohol. Her efforts began the congregation's tradition of using grape juice instead of wine for communion.

=== Present-day location ===
The present-day church, erected at Delaware Avenue and Walnut Street in Indianapolis, was completed in 1892 and dedicated on April 16, 1893. W. Scott Moore, a local architect, designed the church; Charlton Eden and Sons, who were members of the congregation, constructed the facility at a cost of $47,500. The price included the building, an organ, and other furnishings. The church's cornerstone was laid on July 26, 1892, and formal dedication ceremonies were held on April 16, 1893. Two additions have been made to the site. The east side of the church was expanded in 1913 and an education wing was built adjacent to the church in 1922. Norman Hill, a member of the congregation, designed for the new education wing, which cost $125,000 to construct.

== Description ==
The brick and stone masonry church on North Delaware Street faces west and is designed in the Romanesque Revival style. The church dates from 1892 and has a red brick and stone masonry exterior with stained-glass windows and a 100-foot (30 m) tower. A Romanesque Revival-style red brick and stone addition extending east of the original church was built in 1913. The education wing was added in 1922 to house a gymnasium, classrooms, and a dining hall.

The church's interior follows the Akron Plan and has three entrances at the building's corners. The church's pipe organ, choir, pulpit, and a marble-encased baptistery were installed in the sanctuary's northeast corner. Walnut paneling was added to the choir loft in 1954, in addition to a new Moeller Company pipe organ with more than 1,000 pipes. Oak pews arranged on a slanted floor in a semi-circle facing the pulpit and choir provide good visibility for the congregation during church services.

The sanctuary has a vaulted ceiling and its stained-glass windows include various Christian symbols such as a cross, crown, anchor, palms, and vines. A large, sliding door on the east side of the sanctuary provides access to fellowship hall, which includes wrought-iron grillwork on its second-floor balcony.

== Mission ==
Christian Chapel (Central Christian Church) helped organized other Disciples of Christ congregations in Indianapolis. One of its mission churches, formed in 1866, became the Second Christian Church, the city's first African American Christian Church (Disciples of Christ) congregation. (The Second Christian Church was renamed Light of the World Christian Church in 1982.) The Third Christian Church (Disciples of Christ) congregation was organized in 1868.

Central Christian Church, known for its educational programs, community outreach, and foreign ministry, was among the first to establish graded Sunday school classes. In addition, the congregation was a pioneer in developing activities for Indianapolis's inner-city residents. Over the years the church became known for its music, choir, and organ programs.

== Membership ==
Although it began with a few members in 1833, Central Christian Church's membership had reached 1,715 by 1936, ranking it among the largest of Indiana's Disciples of Christ congregations at that time.

== Notable members ==
- Ovid Butler, an Indianapolis lawyer, was the founder and first president of the board of commissioners of North Western Christian University (present-day Butler University).
- Zerelda G. Wallace, a temperance advocate, women's suffrage leader, and the wife of former Indiana governor David Wallace.

== Worship services ==
- Sunday worship services: 10:30 a.m.
